= Henry Collins (official) =

American civil servant and Communist

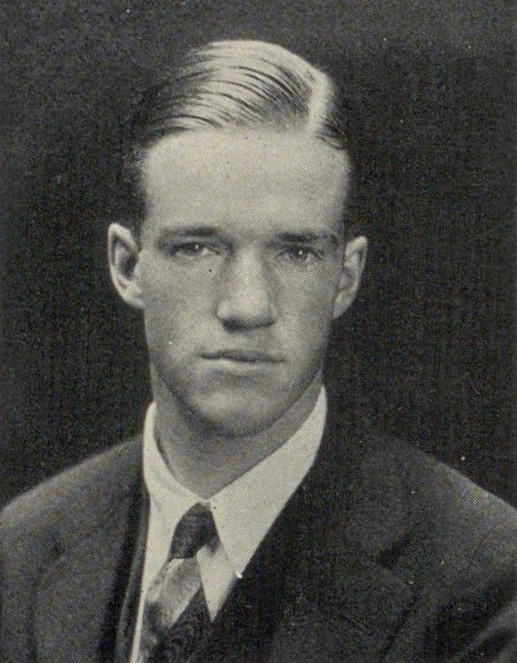
Collins in the Princeton University yearbook, 1926

Henry Hill Collins Jr. (April 7, 1905 – May 25, 1961) was an American government official in the New Deal National Recovery Administration in the 1930s and later the Agricultural Adjustment Administration. He was a member of the Communist Party USA (CPUSA) and the Washington D.C.–based Ware group, along with Alger Hiss, Lee Pressman, Harry Dexter White and others. He was also a "pioneer in the compiling of ornithological field guides."

== Early life ==
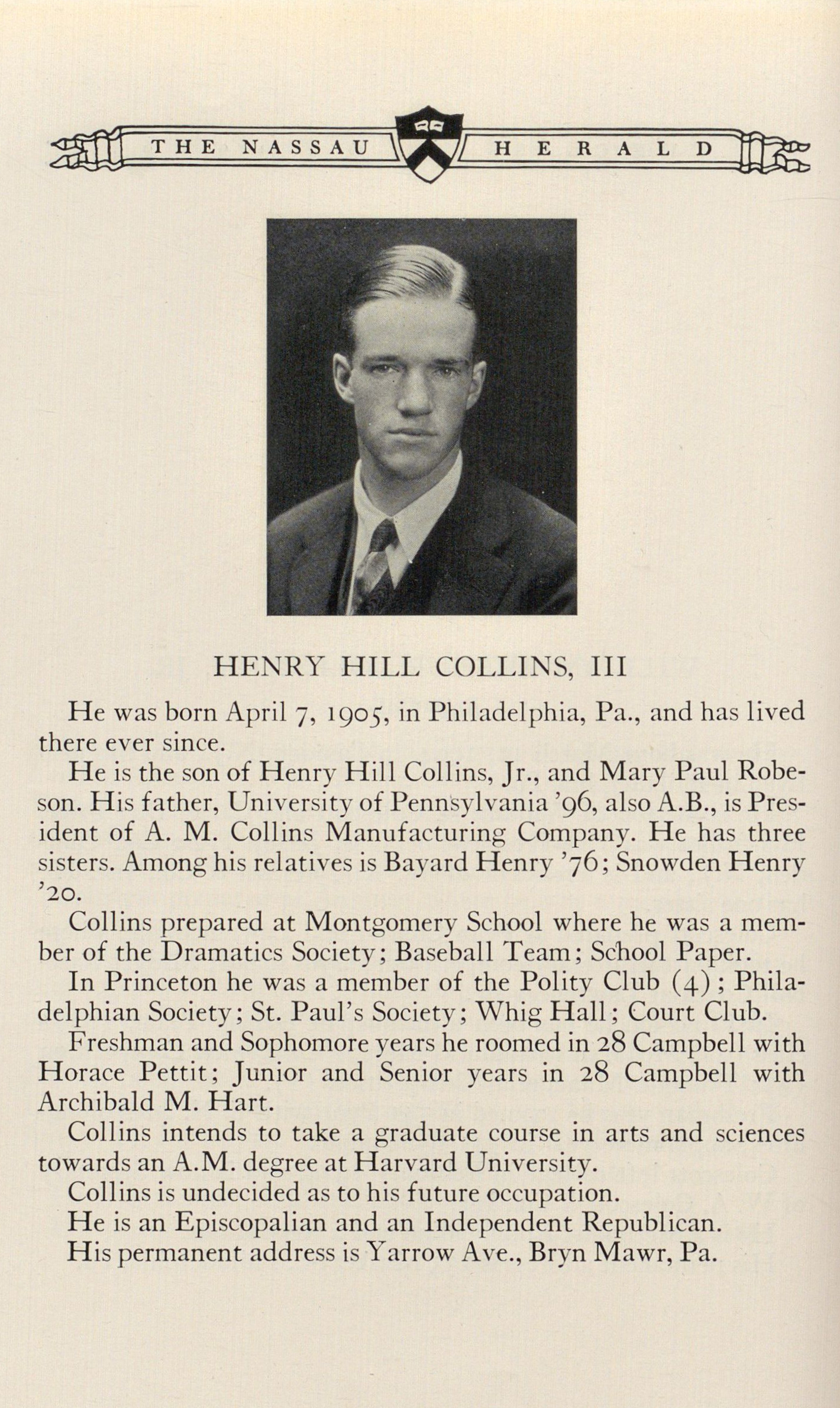
Collins in the Princeton University yearbook, 1926

Collins was born in Philadelphia, Pennsylvania on April 7, 1905, a "scion of a Philadelphia manufacturing family" in paper products. According to Collins, his ancestors came from England in 1640. He received a BA from Princeton University and a business degree from Harvard University.

Collins was a childhood friend of Alger Hiss in Baltimore. Whittaker Chambers also described Collins as "my personal friend."

Initially, Collins worked in the family paper business. He left during the Great Depression for work in the federal government during the New Deal.

== Government career ==
In 1933, Collins worked in the National Recovery Administration. He also worked at the Agricultural Adjustment Administration and the US Department of Labor. He also worked for the Soil Conservation Service, the US Department of Labor, and a House committee on migration. In 1941, he joined the U.S. Small Business Committee, then a Military Affair subcommittee.

During World War II, Collins served as a captain in the Army, fought at the Battle of the Bulge, and won three ribbons and "five European campaign stars." Immediately after the war, he worked for six months as a district official for displaced persons in Germany as part of the States Department's division of occupied territories. Collins remained in government service until 1947.

In 1948, he was serving as executive director of the American Russian Institute in New York and living at 58 Park Avenue, New York (as testified before HUAC in 1948).

== Alleged espionage activities ==
In August 1948, as the Hiss Case began, he appeared under subpoena before the House Un-American Activities Committee (HUAC) and would answer no questions of substance.

In 1950, Ware lived at the San Cristobal Valley Ranch near Los Alamos, New Mexico, and its atomic proving grounds. During testimony in 1953, Collins declared, "The ranch was a perfectly legitimate business operation."

In 1952, Nathaniel Weyl confirmed under oath that Collins had been a member of the Ware Group founded by Harold Ware and inherited by Whittaker Chambers.

Subpoenaed again in 1953, he declared, "I will not be a finger man for this committee."

== Personal life and death ==
Collins married Susan B. Anthony II, great-niece of Susan B. Anthony. He married Mary Evans Collins with whom he had two sons and one daughter.

Collins once spotted a prothonotary warbler for Alger Hiss.

Collins died age 57 on May 25, 1961, at Montefiore Hospital in the Bronx after a car crash two days earlier.

== Works ==
In addition to books on American and Soviet government, Collins may have authored some dozen books on birds.

- America's Own Refugees; Our 4,000,000 Homeless Migrants (Princeton: Princeton University Press, 1941)
- The Constitutions of the 16 Constituent or Union Republics of the USSR: A Comparative Analysis (1950)
- Bent's Life Histories of North American Birds (edited) (1960)
- Bird Watchers' Guide (1961)

== See also ==
- List of American spies
- Ware Group
- Whittaker Chambers
- Noel Field
- Harold Glasser
- John Herrmann
- Alger Hiss
- Donald Hiss
- Victor Perlo
- J. Peters
- Ward Pigman
- Lee Pressman
- Vincent Reno
- Julian Wadleigh
- Harold Ware
- Nathaniel Weyl
- Harry Dexter White
- Nathan Witt
