= Harold Ware =

American agricultural engineer and communist activist

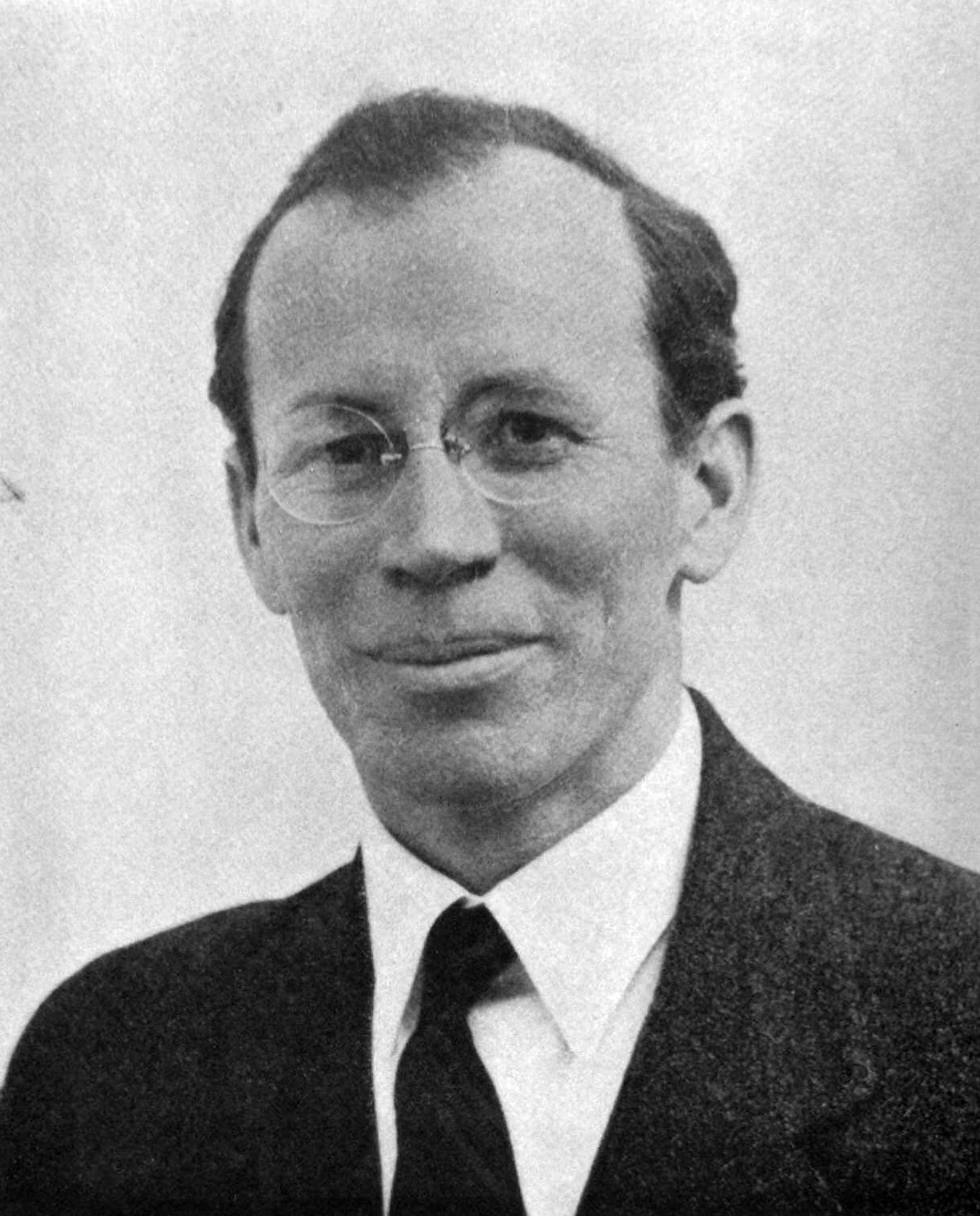
- Ware's passport photo, 1927
- Born: Harold Maskell Ware; August 19, 1889; Woodstown, New Jersey, U.S.
- Died: August 14, 1935 (aged 45); Harrisburg, Pennsylvania, U.S.
- Education: Pennsylvania State College
- Occupations: Agricultural engineer, Soviet GRU spy
- Spouse(s): Margaret Stevens (1st); Clarissa "Cris" Smith (2nd) Jessica Smith (m. 1925) (3rd)
- Children: 4
- Parents: Lucien Bonaparte Ware (father); Ella Reeve Bloor (mother)
- Espionage activity
- Allegiance: Soviet Union
- Codename: "H.R. Harrow" (1921) "Harrow" (1928) "George Anstrom" (1932)

Harold or "Hal" Ware (August 19, 1889 – August 14, 1935) was an American Marxist, regarded as one of the Communist Party's top experts on agriculture. He was employed by a federal New Deal agency in the 1930s. He is alleged to have been a Soviet spy and is understood to have founded the "Ware Group," a covert group of operatives within the United States government aiding Soviet intelligence agents.

== Background ==
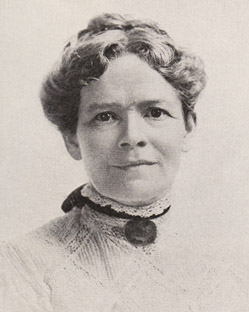
Ella Reeve Bloor c. 1910

Harold Maskell Ware, best known by his nickname "Hal," was born on August 19, 1889, in Woodstown, New Jersey, the fourth child of Ella Reeve Bloor and her husband, Lucien Bonaparte Ware. Two of Ware's three older siblings died in early childhood.

His mother, Ella Bloor, converted to socialism during 1894-1895, when the family lived in Philadelphia. She became a lifelong activist in the labor movement, an early member of the Social Democracy of America (organized by Victor L. Berger and Eugene V. Debs), and a founder of the Communist Party of America. Ware was raised in a politically radical household, as a "Red Diaper Baby."

When he was 15, a case of measles left Ware with what doctors believed to be an early case of tuberculosis. His divorced mother moved with him and two brothers to the country for a year, while the rest of the family lived with his father in Philadelphia and attended school there. While his mother went weekly to Wilmington to speak and organize literature sales (as Delaware state organizer for the Socialist Party), Ware lived a rural life. Although he would return to school in the big city the following year, his orientation towards the countryside was firmly established.

Following his graduation from high school (circa 1907), Ware enrolled in a two-year course in agriculture at Pennsylvania State College, later Penn State University.

== Career ==
Following graduation, with financial help from his father he bought a grain and dairy farm near Arden, a small town near Philadelphia, where he learned farming firsthand. His brief experience as a working farmer made him almost a unique figure among pioneer members of the American Communist Party, a group almost exclusively composed of urban laborers, factory workers, or intellectuals (and mostly foreign-born).

Before WWI began, Ware had proven himself something of an agricultural innovator. Unable to afford equipment for his tractor, he welded together two harrows for horses. He adapted other horse-drawn gear for use in mechanized agriculture.

After three years, Ware sold the farm and took a job in a shipyard as a draftsman, for which he had a natural faculty. This lasted until the end of the First World War, whose armistice in November 1918 ended the torrent of government funding directed toward the shipbuilding industry.

=== Communist Party ===
Communist Labor Party of America logo

Although not a delegate to its founding convention, Ware was a member of the Communist Labor Party of America (CLP) from the year of its origin, 1919, as were his mother and older sister, Helen. Ware and his family stayed with the CLP throughout its permutations, merging into the United Communist Party in 1920, into the Communist Party of America in 1921, and into the "aboveground" Workers Party of America in 1922, and eventually the Communist Party of the USA in 1929.

Almost immediately after the Party launched, federal and state authorities moved against the fledgling communist movement, forcing its adherents to make use of pseudonyms and to conduct their activities in secret. During the so-called "underground period" of the party, the agriculturally-oriented Ware used the pseudonym "H.R. Harrow," publishing under that by-line in the communist press. (The pseudonym seems to have been a pun on his real given name, "Harold.")

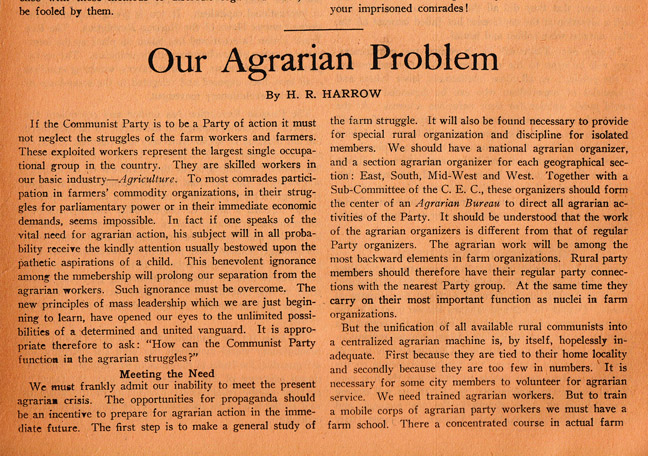
First section of "H.R. Harrow's" agricultural recommendations to the underground Communist Party of America (November 1921)

In 1921, eager to study the plight of migrant farm workers firsthand with a view to organizing them for the Communist Party, Ware took a six-month trip around the United States, working harvests from the South to the Midwest, Northwest and then East again through the Upper Midwest. This experience, combined with his previous agricultural experience, cemented Ware's place as the Communist Party's leading agricultural expert.

That fall, in addition to articles he wrote for the "underground" and "aboveground" Communist press, Ware compiled an exhaustive survey of American agriculture, including maps showing distribution of types of farms, farm incomes, and so forth in different sections of the country. The research was transmitted to the Communist International in Moscow, where it was read and praised by Lenin himself.

In late 1921, Ware attended the founding convention in New York of the Workers Party of America. He was elected an alternate to the governing Central Executive Committee of that organization. Ware was not typically a member of the Communist Party's top committees; he preferred to work in the agricultural sector rather than to engage in factional party politics.

=== Soviet collective farming ===
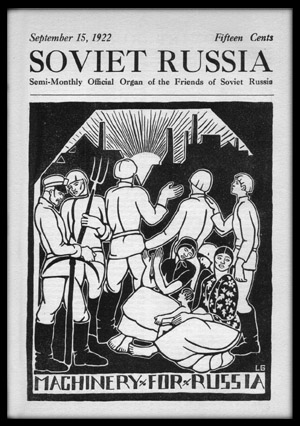
Soviet Russia, official magazine of the Friends of Soviet Russia (cover by Lydia Gibson)

Ware helped come up with the idea of using funds raised by the Friends of Soviet Russia organization to construct a model collective farm in Soviet Russia. His farm would serve as a model to help to alleviate the great Russian famine through production of grain plus firsthand demonstration of modern agricultural technique. An appropriation of $75,000 was granted for the project, with Ware's half-brother, Carl Reeve, traveling around the U.S., showing a motion picture depicting horrific conditions in Russia to help raise funds. Funding in hand, Ware went to the J.I. Case Farm Implement Co. and brokered a deal for 24 tractors and related equipment.

In May 1922, Hal and Cris Ware left his three children in America for Soviet Russia along with their tractors, implements, a complete medical unit, and several tons of food supplies. Also making the voyage was a doctor who spoke Russian and a group of American farmers to operate the machinery. The group had been assigned land in the village of Toikino in Perm guberniia, a substantial distance from any centers of population. They taught local peasants the basics of machine operation and plowed 4,000 acres (16 km^{2}) of land. Shortages of fuel, hauled by peasant wagons some 40 miles (64 km) from the nearest train station, severely hampered their efforts. At season's end, the American crew left for Moscow, whence they went home to America with thanks.

The next year, Soviet authorities were eager to expand the Toikino experiment of 1922. The Soviet People's Commissariat of Agriculture offered a large tract of fertile land in the Kuban region, just north of the Black Sea for a second model farm. Working again with the Friends of Soviet Russia organization, Ware organized a party of 40 to make the trip, including agricultural specialists, a doctor, and a nurse. He arrived in Soviet Russia to inspect the land designated for the project, only to be told by Soviet officials that the deal was off because local peasants had begun to allocate the land among themselves. A hasty search commenced for yet another site, in the North Caucasus, but the project was delayed.

Ware spent most of 1925 raising funds for his Soviet farming venture. This farm was organized as a Russian-American joint venture, with Ware as its American Director and then director of the state farm for three years. The project took over four flour mills and profitably operated them; they began to electrify the countryside.

During winter 1928-29, Ware returned to the United States, where he attempted to interest American agricultural equipment manufacturers in the Soviet market. He convinced some companies to send test tractors and implements along with mechanics to assemble them. He stayed in the Soviet through the collectivization campaign of 1929-30.

=== Return to America ===
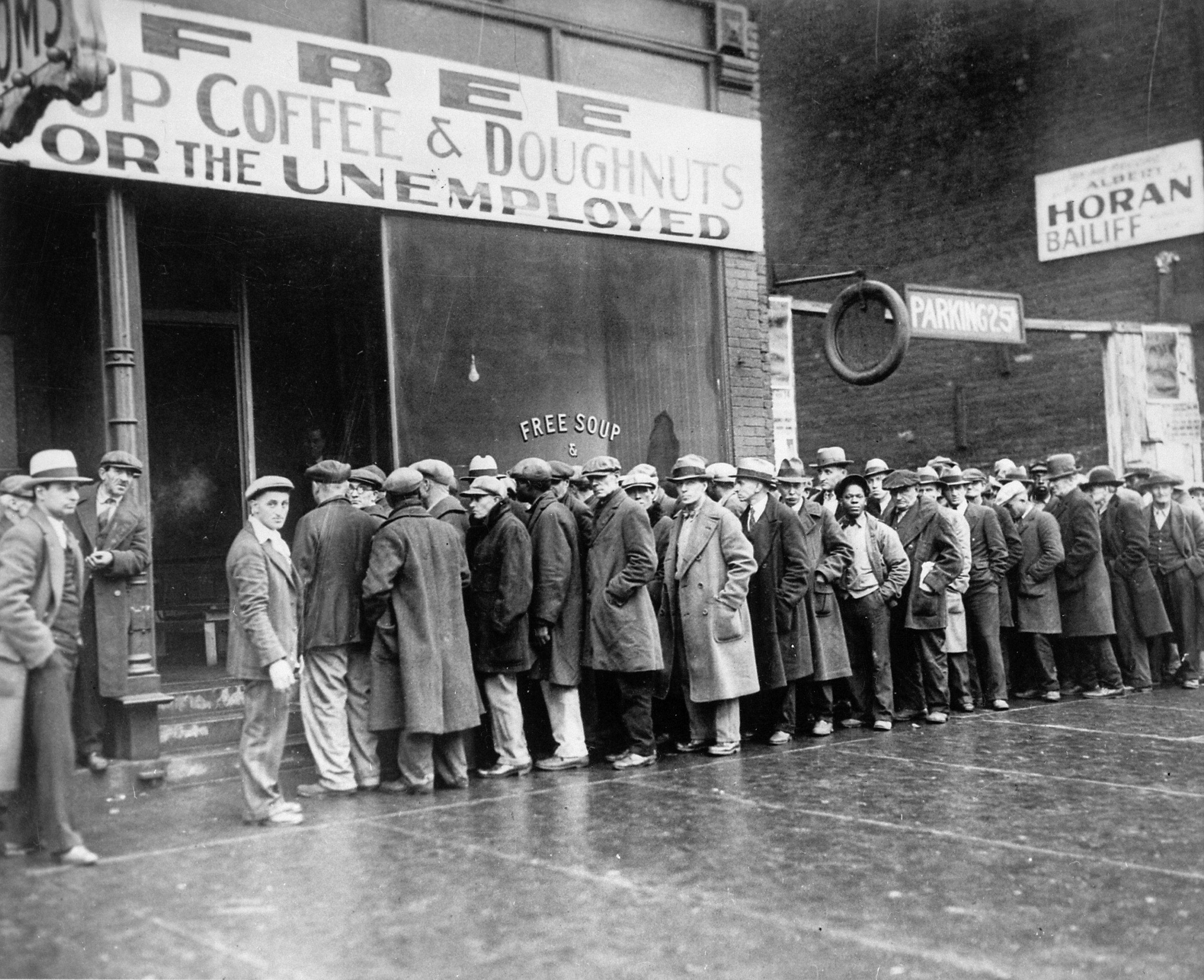
Unemployed men outside soup kitchen (opened by Al Capone) in Depression-era Chicago (1931)

In Spring 1931, Ware set out to organizing farmers and farm-workers in America. In the company of Lem Harris, another Communist Party agricultural expert, he made a year-long survey of American agriculture, echoing his research of 1921. The pair travelled by car around the United States, visiting nearly every state in the union, studying the sometimes desperate conditions which resulted from the collapse of agricultural prices associated with the Great Depression.

Shortly after completion of this task, Ware established a research center in Washington, DC called Farm Research, Inc. and recruited personnel to run it. The institute, funded by the Communist Party, published a newspaper called The Farmers National Weekly continuously throughout the Great Depression. Fellow Communist Party member Herbert Joseph Putz (Erik Bert) (1904-1981) edited the newspaper (1934-1936) ("Farm Research" received funding from the Robert Marshall Foundation, which also funded the Communist controlled news agency "Federated Press.") In 1932, Ware was active in the Farmers Holiday Association on behalf of the Communist Party.

== Soviet espionage: Ware Group ==
=== Allegations: Whittaker Chambers ===
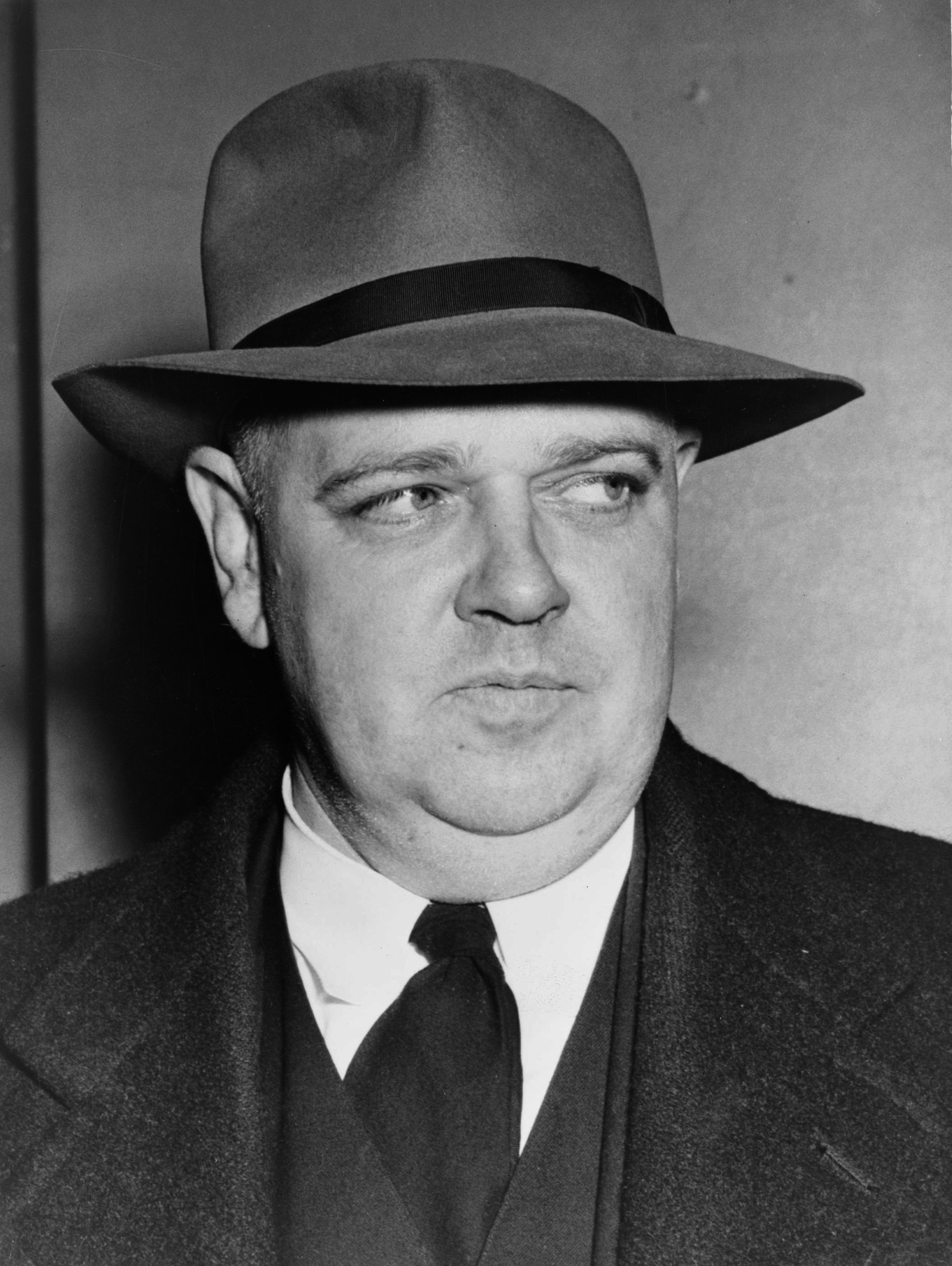
Whittaker Chambers around the time he first made his public allegations about the Ware Group (1948)

In his 1952 memoir, Witness, former Communist Whittaker Chambers wrote that from the time of Ware's death to his defection from the Communist Party in April 1938, he had been a member of the "Washington spy apparatus" headed by Colonel Boris Bykov, a Russian military intelligence officer. Chambers wrote that in addition to the four members of the group (also identified by Lee Pressman under oath to Congress in 1950, though Pressman denied that the group engaged in espionage):

There must have been sixty or seventy others, though Pressman did not necessarily know them all; neither did I. All were dues-paying members of the Communist Party. Nearly all were employed in the United States Government, some in rather high positions, notably in the Department of Agriculture, the Department of Justice, the Department of the Interior, the National Labor Relations Board, the Agricultural Adjustment Administration, the Railroad Retirement Board, the National Research Project — and others.

Chambers further wrote that "by 1938, the Soviet espionage apparatus in Washington had penetrated the US State Department, the US Treasury Department, the Bureau of Standards and the Aberdeen Proving Ground in Maryland. These individuals "supplied the Soviet espionage apparatus with secret or confidential information, usually in the form of official United States Government documents for microfilming," Chambers stated.

In the 1930s, Hal Ware was employed by the federal government, working for the Agricultural Adjustment Administration (AAA), a New Deal agency which reported to the Secretary of Agriculture but was independent of the Department of Agriculture bureaucracy. According to Chambers, he also "organized that Washington underground" in which he was later to work. Introduced to him in the spring of 1934, Chambers described Ware at length:

He was as American as ham and eggs and as indistinguishable as everybody else. He stood about five feet nine, a trim, middle-aging man in 1934, with a plain face, masked by a quiet earnestness of expression wholly reassuring to people whom quickness of mind makes uncomfortable. Nevertheless, his mind was extremely quick. ...

He might have been a progressive country agent or a professor of ecology at an agricultural college. And yet there was something unprofessorially jaunty about the flip of his hat brim and his springy stride. ... It is true that he liked to drive his car at breakneck speed almost as well as to talk about soils, tenant farmers and underground organization ...

Harold Ware was a frustrated farmer. The soil was in his pores. Unlike most American Communists, who managed to pass from one big city to another without seeing anything in the intervening spaces, Ware was absorbed in the land and its problems. He held that, with the deepening of the agricultural crisis, and with the rapid mechanization of agriculture, the time had come for revolutionary organization among farmers.

According to Chambers' testimony, when he came back from Soviet Russia in 1930, Ware carried with him $25,000 in US currency hidden in a money belt, funds from the Comintern for work among the farmers. It was with these funds that he had established Farm Research Inc. in Washington, DC. But his real mission was espionage, Chambers wrote:

Once the New Deal was in full swing, Hal Ware was like a man who has bought a farm sight unseen only to discover that the crops are all in and ready to harvest. All that he had to do was to hustle them into the barn. The barn in this case was the Communist Party. In the AAA, Hal found a bumper crop of incipient or registered Communists. On its legal staff were Lee Pressman, Alger Hiss and John Abt (later named by Elizabeth Bentley as one of her contacts). There was Charles Krivitsky, a former physicist at New York University, then or shortly after to be known as Charles Kramer (also, later on, one of Elizabeth Bentley's contacts). Abraham George Silverman (another of Elizabeth Bentley's future contacts) was sitting with a little cluster of communists over at the Railroad Retirement Board.

Others named by Chambers included Henry H. Collins, Jr., Laurence Duggan, Nathan Witt, Marion Bachrach, and Victor Perlo. Others subsequently mentioned in these ranks included John Herrmann, Nathaniel Weyl, Donald Hiss, and Harry Dexter White. According to Chambers, Ware was in close contact with and directly reported to J. Peters, "the head of the underground section of the American Communist Party":

... By 1934, the Ware Group had developed into a tightly organized underground, managed by a directory of seven men. In time it included a number of secret sub-cells whose total membership I can only estimate — probably about seventy-five Communists. Sometimes they were visited officially by J. Peters who lectured them on Communist organization and Leninist theory and advised them on general policy and specific problems. For several of them were so placed in the New Deal agencies (notably Alger Hiss, Nathan Witt, John Abt and Lee Pressman) that they were in a position to influence policy at several levels.

=== Corroboration from Ware Group members ===
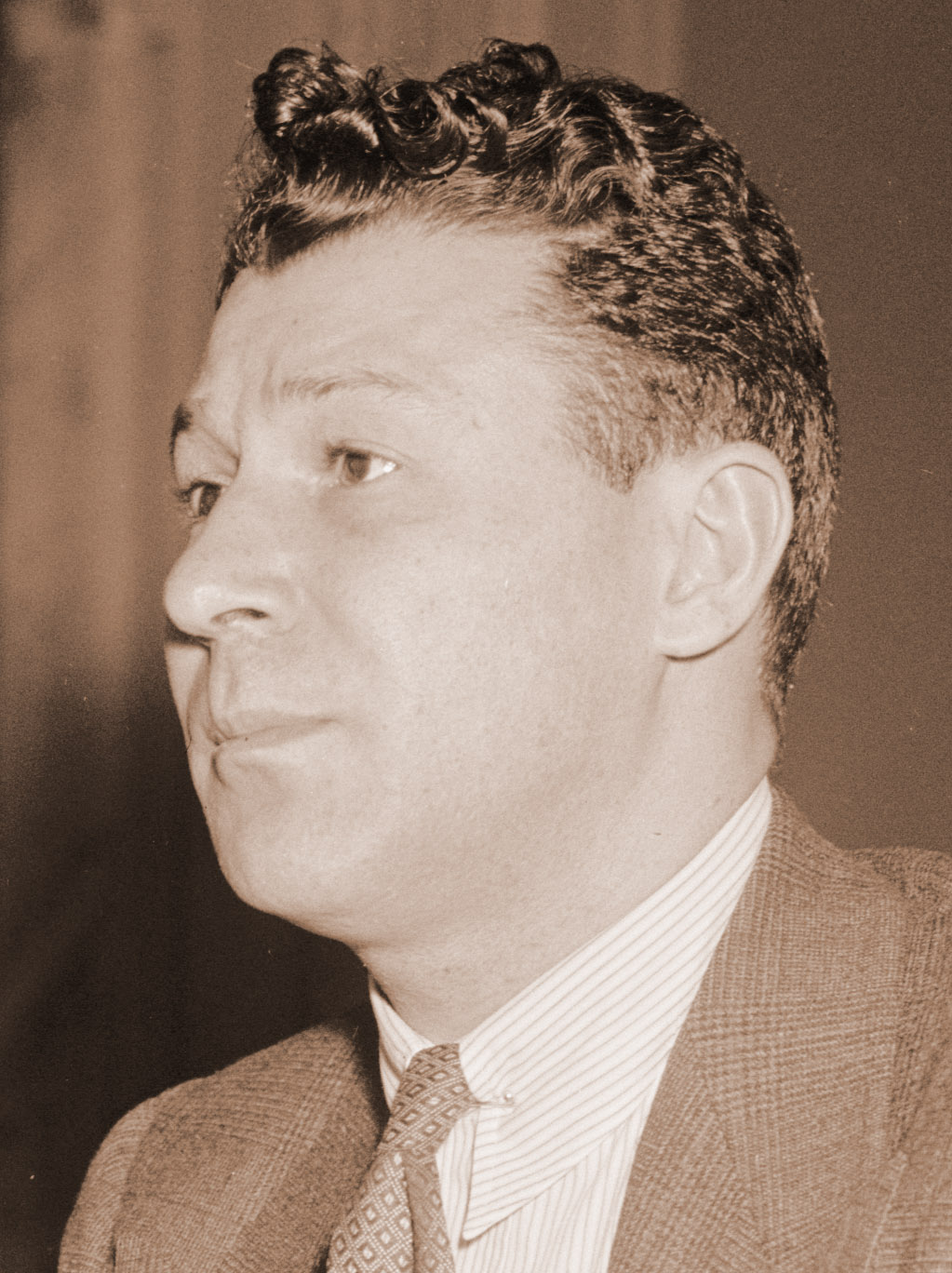
Lee Pressman, shortly after leaving the Ware Group, working for the CIO (1938)

- Lee Pressman: On August 28, 1950, Lee Pressman gave testimony against his former comrades, though denied that they engaged in espionage. He stated he had met Ware and that:

In my desire to see the destruction of Hitlerism and an improvement in economic conditions here at home, I joined a Communist group in Washington, D. C, about 1934. My participation in such group extended for about a year, to the best of my recollection.

Pressman also indicated that in at least one meeting of his group, perhaps two, he had met Soviet intelligence agent J. Peters. Pressman's 1950 testimony provided the first corroboration of Chambers' allegation that a Washington, D.C., Communist group around Ware existed, with federal officials Nathan Witt, John Abt and Charles Kramer named by Pressman as members of this party cell.

- Nathaniel Weyl: In 1952, Nathaniel Weyl testified before the U.S. Senate Internal Security Committee that he had been a member of the Ware group, and that Alger Hiss had attended meetings as well – the only eyewitness corroboration of Whittaker Chambers's testimony that Alger Hiss was a Communist and Ware Group member. Of his own Ware Group participation, Weyl said: "I was one of its less enthusiastic members." Weyl described what could be interpreted as Ware's efforts to corral him into espionage and his own effort to extract himself from the group:

Ware wanted me to try to get into the Foreign Service and be attached to the staff of William Bullitt, our first Ambassador to the Soviet Union ... I didn't think there was anything illegal about membership in the Ware unit, but nevertheless it was duplicitous ... I told Hal Ware that the Moscow idea was out and that I wanted to leave Washington and resign from government. He said: absolutely not. I forced his hand by committing an appalling breach of security. I showed up at a cell meeting with the girl I was having an affair with, a young lady who was not a Communist Party member and who had known nothing about the group. Ware withdrew his objections and I resigned from AAA.

- John Abt: In his 1993 autobiography, * John Abt, later long-time attorney for the Communist Party, confirmed that the Ware Group had existed, that it was a secret Communist Party unit, and that Ware had recruited him and several of the others named by Chambers for the Party.
- Hope Hale Davis: In her 1994 memoir, Hope Hale Davis also admitted to membership in the Ware group: Davis confirmed that it was engaged in illegal activity.

== Personal life and death ==
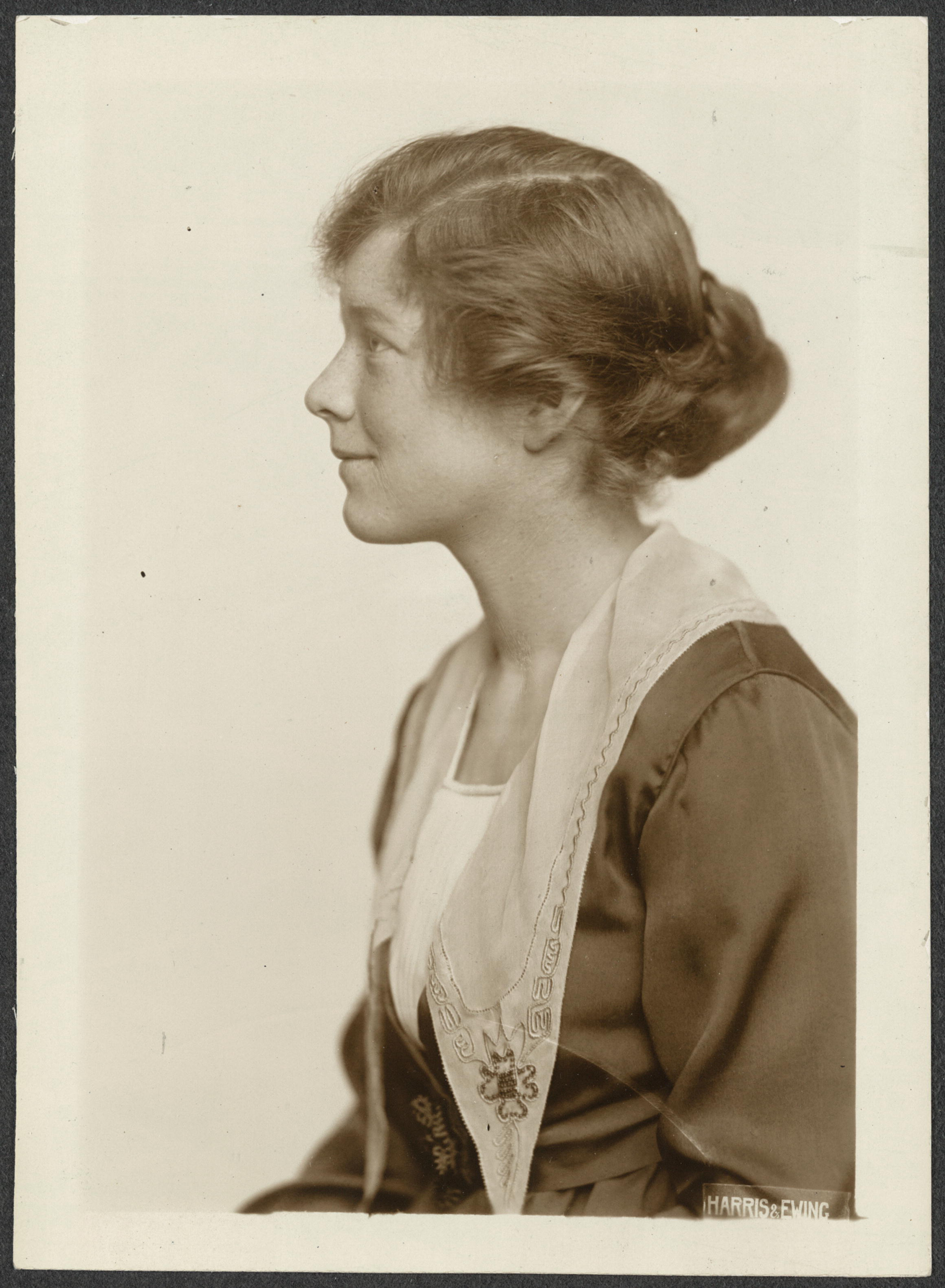
Jessica Smith c. 1913-1918

Ware married Margaret Stephens: in 1916, she died three weeks after birth of their second child, Nancy Stephens Ware.

In August 1917, Ware married his second wife, Clarissa "Cris" Smith. The couple had two children, Robin and Nancy, before divorcing in the early 1920s. Ware's second marriage seems to have ended upon their return to the States. Cris took a job in the National Office of the Workers Party as head of the Committee for Protection of Foreign-Born Workers. She was reported in the Communist Party press as having died of "acute pancreatitis, a rare disease of one of the digestive organs of the stomach," rumored to be a cover story for a botched illegal abortion, on September 27, 1923. Benjamin Gitlow luridly wrote of a love triangle between Cris, Party national secretary C. E. Ruthenberg, and future secretary Jay Lovestone. Her death was "a tragic end, for the last of Cris Ware's abortions proved fatal for her."

While in Russia, Ware met Jessica Smith, working with the Quaker famine relief effort, the American Friends Service Committee. Back in New York City, the pair were married in January 1925 by Rev. Norman Thomas, soon to become a key political leader of the Socialist Party of America.

On August 9, 1935, Ware was critically injured in an automobile accident in the mountains of York Springs near Harrisburg, Pennsylvania when his car collided with a coal truck. He died the next Tuesday at the Harrisburg Hospital, never regaining consciousness after the crash.

== Legacy ==
Ware was memorialized with a chapter in the memoir written by his more famous mother, Ella Reeve Bloor, in 1940:

As a boy he loved the outdoors, was full of restless, eager vitality and bold curiosity. He had a startlingly vivid imagination, and an urge and talent for organizing that continued and marked his whole life. More than ordinarily shy, he forgot his shyness when engaged in one of his organizing ventures, and a flow of colorful, stirring talk would come from him so persuasive that those who heard him were completely carried away. He grew slim and tall, and when we moved to Arden was captain of the baseball team and a leader in tennis and other games. He missed a lot of school because of his siege of tuberculosis, but he read a lot and was always able to make up two or three years of ordinary schooling in a few months of intensive study. His interest in socialism began as early as I can remember.
Hal's interest in agriculture began early. He started raising truck in a small garden in Arden, and sold it around the countryside. His keen sense of beauty showed in the way he fixed up his boxes of vegetables to sell, arranging them artistically in green boxes.
He first planned to study forestry. He used to tell me his dreams of a life in the open, alone on a hillside, a sea of green tree tops below him. While taking the entrance exams for Pennsylvania State College he found that the forestry course would take four years, while there was a fine two-year agricultural course. Beginning to feel, too, that he did not want to live away from people, but among them, he chose agriculture. His interest in economics and politics developed intensely at this time, and while at college he wrote me constantly for the latest news of the socialist movement. We were always very close to one another, and no matter how many months or years we were apart, we could always pick up where we had left off."

After his death, Jessica Smith, Ware's widow married attorney John Abt. Ware left behind four children: Judith, David, Nancy, and Robin.

Hal Ware's half-brother, Carl Reeve, was also a lifelong activist in the Communist Party.

== Works ==
- "Our Agrarian Problem." Signed as "H.R. Harrow." The Communist [New York: Unified CPA], vol. 1, no. 5 (November 1921), pp. 20–21, 23
- "American Agricultural Problems," The Toiler, vol. 4, whole no. 194 (November 12, 1921), pp. 8–10
- "American Farmers in Russia," Soviet Russia Pictorial [New York], vol. 8, no. 4 (April 1923), pg. 77
- "The Factory Farm — A Discussion Article on the Party and the Farm Problem." Signed as "Harrow." Part 1: The Communist, vol. 7, no. 12 (December 1928), pp. 761–769. Part 2: The Communist, vol. 8, no. 3 (March 1929), pp. 142–149
- The American Farmer (as "George Anstrom") (1932)
- "Planning for Permanent Poverty: What Subsistence Farming Really Stands For." Harper's Magazine, April 1935

== See also ==
- List of American spies
- Ware Group
- John Abt
- Whittaker Chambers
- Noel Field
- Harold Glasser
- John Herrmann
- Alger Hiss
- Donald Hiss
- Victor Perlo
- J. Peters
- Ward Pigman
- Lee Pressman
- Vincent Reno
- Julian Wadleigh
- Harold Ware
- Nathaniel Weyl
- Harry Dexter White
- Nathan Witt
