= Harold Glasser =

American economist and spy

Harold Glasser (November 24, 1905 – November 16, 1992) was an economist in the United States Department of the Treasury and spokesman on the affairs of the United Nations Relief and Rehabilitation Administration (UNRRA) 'throughout its whole life' and he had a 'predominant voice' in determining which countries should receive aid. Glasser was a member of the Perlo group of Soviet spies during World War II and worked closely with Harry Dexter White. His code name in Soviet intelligence and in the Venona files is "Ruble".

== Early life ==
Harold Glasser was born on November 24, 1905, in Chicago to Jewish parents who had emigrated from Lithuania. Following the death of his father in 1909, the family lived in extreme poverty.

== Transfer to GRU ==
Harold Glasser joined the United States Department of Treasury in 1936 and became its assistant director of the Division of Monetary Research by late 1938. In 1937, J. Peters transferred Glasser to the Soviet Main Intelligence Directorate (Glavnoe Razvedyvatel'noe Upravlenie) or GRU in order to report on Harry Dexter White's cooperation with Soviet intelligence (Soviet case officer Boris Bykov had pressured Whittaker Chambers on the subject of White's intelligence production). Glasser, the number two man in the division beneath White, reported back that as far as he could discern, White was providing everything of importance.

In 1940, Glasser was appointed Chief American economic adviser to Ecuador through a joint program of the Treasury and U.S. Department of State. In December 1941, the Secret Service forwarded a report to Harry Dexter White indicating that it had evidence Glasser was involved in Communist activities. White never acted on the report. Glasser continued to serve in Ecuador until 1942.

After America became involved in World War II, Glasser received appointments to higher-level positions, such as Vice-Chairman of the War Production Board, was dispatched to serve as economic adviser to American forces in North Africa, U.S. Treasury representative to the United Nations Relief and Rehabilitation Administration, and Treasury representative to the Allied High Commission in Italy.

== Perlo group ==
When Glasser returned to the United States in 1944, he reestablished contact with the Perlo group. Victor Perlo, the group's head, explained to Elizabeth Bentley that Glasser had been a member of the group before the War started, and Glasser was transferred to work with another group. Charles Kramer, another member of the Perlo group, told Bentley that Glasser joined Alger Hiss' group.

In a 25 April 1945 memo from Pavel Fitin, head of KGB foreign intelligence, to Vsevolod Merkulov, head of the overall KGB organization, Fitin asked fair treatment for an award to be given to a longtime operative, Harold Glasser. Fitin called Merkulov's attention to the fact that Glasser had been working for Soviet intelligence for a long time, since May 1937, usually for the KGB but also at times for the GRU. Fitin explained how, while Glasser was working with the GRU, Glasser felt he had been slighted. Fitin explained how the group of GRU agents of which Glasser was part, was decorated with honors of the Soviet Union, but Glasser had been neglected because of his transfer back to KGB. The text from KGB Archives reads in part as follows:

Our agent RUBLE, drawn to work for the Soviet Union in May 1937, passed initially through the military "neighbors" and then through our station valuable information on political and economic issues. ... To our work RUBLE gives much attention and energy is devoted and disciplined agent.

According to data from VADIM the group of agents of the "military" neighbors whose part RUBLE was earlier, recently was decorated with orders of the USSR. RUBLE learned about this fact from his friend ALES, who is the head of the mentioned group. Taking into account RUBLE's devoted work for the USSR for eight years and the fact that, as a result of transfer to our station, RUBLE was not decorated together with other members of the ALES group, consider expedient to put him forward for a decoration of the Order of the Red Star. Ask for your consent.

Fitin's account corroborates Elizabeth Bentley's deposition.

In the transcript # 1759 KGB Washington to Moscow 28 March 1945, Glasser reports the Treasury Department is sending a young lawyer, Josiah DuBois, to Moscow to serve on the American delegation to the Allied Reparations Commission meeting. Glasser says he established "most friendly relations" with DuBois and judged him to be ideologically a Communist, although he was not a CPUSA member. Glasser reports how he counseled DuBois to be more "discreet" in expressing left-wing views and notes that his personal relationship with DuBois was such that he could "normally obtain by asking" anything he wanted.

Glasser is in the subject of several June 1945 Venona cables. Three June 1945 transcripts report Glasser's transmitting U.S. State Department reports of Soviet war losses, a State Department report on a Finnish company believed to be hiding Nazi financial assets, and an Office of Strategic Services report on the movement of Nazi gold through Swiss banks.

== SISS investigation ==
After the war, he was economic adviser to the American delegation at the Council of Foreign Ministers meeting in Moscow in 1947 and economic adviser to the treasury secretary at the board of governors meeting of the World Bank. In December 1947, at the time of his resignation, Glasser was assistant director of Treasury's Office of International Finance.

Glasser's promotions and job ratings throughout his career were determined by fellow Communists Frank Coe and William Ullmann; promotions and job ratings were reviewed and backed by Harry Dexter White. Transcripts of Glasser's promotions and job rating forms signed by Coe, Ullmann, and White are in Interlocking Subversion in Government Departments Report.

Pavel Fitin later described as "valuable" the political and economic information Glasser passed along, all of which found its way into thirty-four special reports to Joseph Stalin and other top Kremlin leaders. Glasser's materials were "all of critical interest to the leadership of the USSR" because it included the contents of an Office of Strategic Services (OSS) memorandum about the economic consequences of stripping Germany of heavy industry; an internal memorandum from the Department of the Treasury concerning conferences at State Department on postwar reparations; and an internal memorandum by the Treasury Department concerning Lend-Lease policy toward the Soviet Union. A 4 June 1945 cable reports Glasser would be on the Treasury committee advising Supreme Court Justice Robert Jackson, the U.S. prosecutor at the Nuremberg War Crimes Tribunal.

== Death ==
He died on November 16, 1992.

== Venona ==
Harold Glasser is referenced in the following decrypted Venona project cables:

- 1195 KGB New York to Moscow, 21 July 1943
- 1206 KGB New York to Moscow, 22 July 1943
- 588 New York to Moscow, 29 April 1944
- 769, 771 KGB New York to Moscow, 30 May 1944
- 79 KGB New York to Moscow, 18 January 1945
- 179, 180 KGB Moscow to New York, 25 February 1945
- 1759 KGB Washington to Moscow, 28 March 1945.
- 3598 KGB Washington to Moscow, 21 June 1945
- 3600 KGB Washington to Moscow, 21 June 1945
- 3645 KGB Washington to Moscow, 23 June 1945
- 3688 KGB Washington to Moscow, 28 June 1945

== See also ==
- Venona project
- Wikisource:Venona 79 KGB New York to Moscow, 18 January 1945, KGB in Treasury
- List of American spies
- John Abt
- Whittaker Chambers
- Noel Field
- John Herrmann
- Alger Hiss
- Donald Hiss
- Victor Perlo
- J. Peters
- Ward Pigman
- Lee Pressman
- Vincent Reno
- Julian Wadleigh
- Harold Ware
- Nathaniel Weyl
- Harry Dexter White
- Nathan Witt
