= J. Peters =

Hungarian spy for the USSR in the US (1894–1990)

- J. Peters appearing as "Alexander Stevens" at HUAC hearing on August 30, 1948
- Born: Sándor Goldberger; August 11, 1894; Csap, Austria-Hungary (now Chop, Ukraine)
- Died: 1990 (aged 95–96); Budapest, Hungary
- Occupations: Soviet spy master, Communist Party activist
- Espionage activity
- Allegiance: Soviet Union
- Service years: 1918–1990
- Codename: J. Peters; Alexander Stevens; Joseph Peter; József Péter; Isidore Boorstein; Mr. Silver; Steve; Jack Roberts; Steve Miller

J. Peters (born Sándor Goldberger; 11 August 1894 – 1990) was the most commonly known pseudonym of a man who last went by the name "Alexander Stevens" in 1949. Peters was a journalist, political activist, and accused Soviet spy who was a leading figure of the Hungarian language section of the Communist Party USA in the 1920s and 1930s. From the early 1930s, Peters was actively involved in the espionage activities of the Soviet Union in the United States, fabricating passports, recruiting agents, and accumulating and passing along confidential and secret information.

In October 1947, Peters was served with an arrest warrant for alleged violation of the Immigration Act of 1924, which required alien immigrants in America to possess a valid visa. On August 3, 1948, while appearing under subpoena before the House Committee on Un-American Activities (HUAC), Whittaker Chambers identified Peters as a spy. Later that month, Peters appeared under subpoena before HUAC but did not cooperate. He invoked the Fifth Amendment and refused to answer sensitive questions. On May 8, 1949, Peters left for communist Hungary to avoid imminent deportation by the U.S. Immigration and Naturalization Service. Peters adopted the name "József Péter" and remained in Hungary until his death in 1990.

== Early years ==
Sándor Goldberger (or Alexander Goldberger) was born August 11, 1894, in the town of Csap, Ruthenia, in the northeastern part of the Kingdom of Hungary. There were about 3,000 people in the town at the time of Sándor's birth, including a substantial number of ethnic Jews like the Goldbergers who had fled from official and popular repression in the Russian Empire.

Many of the Jews throughout the Kingdom of Hungary attempted to assimilate into society by the adoption of local language and customs, speaking Hungarian rather than Yiddish and, in general, attempting to become, in the words of one scholar, "more Magyar than the Magyars themselves." Peters's biographer notes that this seems to have been the case with the Goldberger family, who apparently spoke Hungarian in the home and who gave all three of their sons (Sándor, József, and Imre) ethnic Hungarian names.

Like most other Jewish families in Csap, the Goldberger family was poor, with Sándor's father working as a train brakeman before leaving to join his wife running a restaurant. The family seems to have been secular rather than actively religious members of the Jewish faith, but it remains possible that they held nominal membership in a local synagogue.

In 1899, Sándor was sent to the large city of Debrecen to live with his grandfather, where educational opportunities were brighter than those of Csap. Sándor attended and graduated from primary school and gymnasium in that city. He apparently developed an affinity for the workers movement at a similarly early age, influenced by his grandfather and an uncle who were active participants in the railroad and machinist unions.

Following his graduation from gymnasium in 1912, Sándor decided to become a lawyer, enrolling in the law school at the University of Kolozsvár in Transylvania. He did not attend courses in that city, however, instead studying law on his own in Debrecen and returning only to take examinations. (Whittaker Chambers stated in his memoirs that, "He had studied law at the university of Debrecen in Hungary.") To support himself, Sándor worked briefly in an office job before taking a position teaching at the gymnasium in Debrecen.

With the coming of World War I in the summer of 1914, Sándor was drafted into the Austro-Hungarian Army, receiving training in the infantry. Sándor was selected for officer training and early in 1915, he received a commission as a Lieutenant in the infantry reserve. Sándor was assigned to the Italian Front, where he remained for the duration of the war.

== Activism ==
=== Europe ===
With the war coming to a close, Sándor returned to his hometown of Csap, where he came into contact with radicalized friends espousing Marxist ideas about the imperialist nature of the war and touting the new social system in the process of being established in the wake of the Russian Revolution. Sándor was won over to the Bolshevik cause and, together with four former prisoners of war who were released from Russian captivity in 1918, became one of the founders of the first local group of the Communist Party of Hungary in Csap.

During the brief Hungarian Soviet Republic headed by Béla Kun in 1919, Sándor served briefly on the governing council of Ung County. He managed to escape repression during the so-called White Terror after the collapse of the Hungarian Soviet regime, apparently benefiting from the 1920 Treaty of Trianon, which made Carpathian Ruthenia part of Czechoslovakia.

=== America ===
Peters emigrated to the United States in 1924 and became an organizer for the Communist Party USA, concentrating his efforts in the party's Hungarian language section. Peters was a delegate to the Sixth Congress of the Communist International in Moscow in 1928 and was appointed head of the party's National Minorities Department in 1929.

By 1929 Peters (using the name "Joseph Peter," with no "s" at the end) was living in New York City and the Secretary of the Communist Party's Hungarian Bureau. He attended the CPUSA's 6th National Convention in March 1929 as the official representative of the party's Hungarian Bureau. He was also an alternate member of the governing Central Executive Committee of the party.

== Espionage ==
As organizational secretary for the Communist Party in New York state in 1930, Peters was put in charge of building an illegal apparatus, or network, designed to support Soviet foreign policy. CPUSA and Comintern documents at the RGASPI archive in Moscow show that he headed the CPUSA underground apparatus from the early 1930s until Whittaker Chambers's defection in 1938. Peters was sent to Moscow for training with the Comintern in 1931 and was made a senior intern in the Anglo-American Secretariat. Returning to the US in 1932, the Central Committee assigned him to work in the secret apparatus, where he remained until June 1938.

Around 1933 or 1934, Peters took over from Chambers's previous rezident handler. Chambers ascribed central importance to Peters' role:

The Soviet espionage apparatus in Washington also maintained constant contact with the national underground of the American Communist Party in the person of its chief. He was a Hungarian Communist who had been a minor official in the Hungarian Soviet Government of Bela Kun. He was in the United States illegally and was known variously as J . Peters, Alexander Stevens, Isidore Boorstein, Mr. Silver, etc. His real name was Alexander Goldberger and he had studied law at the university of Debrecen in Hungary. In addition, I had myself, during my entire six years in the Soviet underground, been the official secret contact man between a succession of Soviet apparatuses and the Communist Party, U.S.A. Both the open and the underground sections of the party were under orders to carry out, so far as they were able, any instructions I might give them in the name of the Soviet apparatuses.

In 1935, Peters penned The Communist Party: A Manual on Organization, which includes the following:

The Communist Party puts the interest of the working class and the Party above everything. The Party subordinates all forms of Party organization to these interests. From this it follows that one form of organization is suitable for legal existence of the Party, and another for the conditions of underground, illegal existence...

The secret apparatus, under Peters, carried out surveillance, exposed infiltrators, protected sensitive party records from seizure, and disrupted rival communist and leftist movements such as the Trotskyists. Another of his duties included maintaining contact with the Ware group in Washington, D.C., and he took over direct supervision of that group in 1935. The head of the CPUSA, Earl Browder, instructed Peters to co-operate with Soviet intelligence.

About 1936, Peters recognized that some members of the Ware group had potential for advancement within the government so a decision was made to separate them from the group. Chambers became the courier between the GRU and the new group. The members separated included Alger Hiss, Henry Collins and Lee Pressman.

Testimony by former Soviet agent Whittaker Chambers tied the 1937 disappearance of American Communist Party founder and OGPU Agent Juliet Stuart Poyntz' disappearance to the shadowy Soviet Comintern agent J. Peters. As an inside member of the Soviet Comintern and OGPU espionage network, Peters is believed to have participated in the planning of the kidnapping and alleged murder of fellow CPUSA member Poyntz by a Soviet assassination squad.

Peters was removed as head of the secret apparatus two months after Chambers broke with the espionage ring in 1938 and was replaced by Rudy Baker.

In September 1939, Adolf Berle noted just after meeting that Chambers had told him Peters worked with Alexander Trachtenberg, whom Chambers called "member of the Exec. Committee [CPUSA], Head of GPU in U.S."

In 1940, Paul Crouch (later an FBI informant) met with Peters (also Jack Stachel and William Weiner) in Memphis, Tennessee, regarding "underground matters," according to his SSIS testimony on October 26, 1951. Of Peters, Crouch said:

Mr. CROUCH: I came to Memphis because I had just had discussions in New York with Fred Brown, alias Alpi, J. Peters.
Senator EASTLAND: J. Peters was the Communist boss of this country who was over Earl Browder, was he not?
Mr. CROUCH: On underground matters, things of that kind, yes.
Senator EASTLAND: In fact, he was a Soviet military agent?
Mr. CROUCH: Yes, an intelligence agent. He was in charge of all the intelligence work in this country for the international Communist movement.
Senator EASTLAND: A direct representative of the Communist International in Moscow?
Mr. CROUCH: Yes.
Senator EASTLAND: On their payroll?
Mr. CROUCH: Yes.
Senator EASTLAND: On the payroll of the Russian military secret service?
Mr. CROUCH: That is correct. He represented them in this country.

Peters continued to work on the CPUSA's Central Committee staff on what a 1947 Soviet Communist party personnel report, called "special assignments." An examination of the Comintern's records turned up two 1943 messages from the GRU referring to a GRU officer in Washington as having come across "a group of workers singled out by the American Comparty CC [Central Committee] for informational work and headed by the CC worker 'Peter.'" Though usually called "Peters" in the United States, in Comintern archives, his name is often rendered as "Peter." "Informational work" was GRU parlance for clandestine activity.

== Investigation ==
On August 3, 1948, in testimony before the House Committee on Un-American Activities, Chambers publicly stated that Peters was, "to the best of my knowledge, the head of the whole underground United States Communist Party."

On August 30, Peters, under the name "Alexander Stevens" and represented by Carol Weiss King, was subpoenaed to appear before a congressional investigating committee. He refused to answer any questions and left prior to deportation procedures for Hungary.

In 1948, Louis Budenz wrote that he knew "J. V. Peters" as "Jack Roberts" in 1936.

In 1949, Hede Massing testified during Hiss's second trial about meeting Peters and described her involvement in greater detail in her 1951 memoir.

In 1952, Nathaniel Weyl, another member of the Ware Group, named Peters as head of that spy ring.

In his 1952 memoir, Chambers refers mostly to "J. Peters" but also states that he knew him as "Steve" while serving in the underground.

In 1953, Bella Dodd testified that she knew of Peters' manual and also someone named "Steve Miller," though it took her a long time to put the two together. Asked whether she knew him, she responded:

Well, that is an interesting question, because I knew the J. Peter manual before; I had read it. It had been given to me to read and study, and I knew a man by the name of Steve Miller, but Steve Miller was an insignificant little fellow who used to help with mimeographing at party headquarters. He was attached to the New York County committee. He was assigned to teach communism to some of the teachers, kind of take individual teachers who were rising in the party movement and give them special instructions. I thought he was just an insignificant little fellow until one day the authorities picked him up and I discovered he was J. Peters. He was engaged in using teachers throughout the United States for maildrop purposes, for revolutionary mail that was going back and forth from the Soviet Union to the United States. They would approach a pretty innocent teacher who came close to the movement and say, "Would you mind if a letter comes to your address?" Some mail would come to someone in Columbus or Cleveland or in California or in my section of New York, and the person would have no more relationship to that mail than the man in the moon.

Peters is identified as assisting Soviet espionage in deciphered KGB cables and in the KGB documents listed in The Haunted Wood by Allen Weinstein and Alexander Vassiliev. Many years later, he was located by Weinstein in Hungary and interviewed for Weinstein's book Perjury: The Hiss–Chambers Case.

== Later years ==
After his return to Hungary in 1949, Peters served in official Party capacities without prominence. In the 1980s, he wrote a secret Party memoir for the Hungarian party's secret files, which become available to the public and formed an important basis of Red Conspirator by Thomas L. Sakmyster.

== Death and legacy ==
Peters died in Budapest in 1990, "barely noticed in Hungarian newspapers."

In Red Conspirator, Sakmyster concludes that, as far as the Ware Group and related secret groups relate to Peters, they were "conducted by largely on his own initiative.... No Soviet agent ever served directly as his handler."

== Works ==
- The Communist Party: A Manual on Organization (1935)

== See also ==
- List of American spies
- John Abt
- Whittaker Chambers
- Noel Field
- Harold Glasser
- John Herrmann
- Alger Hiss
- Donald Hiss
- Victor Perlo
- Ward Pigman
- Lee Pressman
- Vincent Reno
- Julian Wadleigh
- Harold Ware
- Nathaniel Weyl
- Harry Dexter White
- Nathan Witt
- Carol Weiss King
