= William Ward Pigman =

- Born: March 5, 1910
- Died: September 30, 1977 (aged 67); Woods Hole, Massachusetts
- Occupation: Chemist
- Employer: New York Medical College

William Ward Pigman (March 5, 1910 – September 30, 1977) was a chairman of the Department of Biochemistry at New York Medical College, and a suspected Soviet Union spy as part of the "Karl group" for Soviet Military Intelligence (GRU).

== Biography ==
He was born on March 5, 1910.

He had a Ph.D. in chemistry. He worked for the National Bureau of Standards and the Labor and Public Welfare Committee. Earlier he had been a professor at the University of Alabama.

He supplied documents to Whittaker Chambers and J. Peters for Soviet intelligence as early as 1936. In his book, Witness, Whittaker Chambers refers to Pigman using the pseudonym "Abel Gross". The Gorsky Memo cites him as "114th".

In 1954, he was at the Department of Biochemistry, of the New York Medical College.

He died on September 30, 1977, in Woods Hole, Massachusetts from a heart attack.

== Works ==
- Pigman, William Ward (1972). The Carbohydrates: Chemistry and Biochemistry.
- Pigman, William Ward (1946). Advances in Carbohydrate Chemistry.
- Pigman, William Ward (1957). The Carbohydrates: Chemistry, Biochemistry, Physiology.
- Pigman, William Ward. Evaluation of Agents Used in the Prevention of Oral Diseases.
- Pigman, William Ward (1948). "Chemistry of the Carbohydrates". Annual Review of Biochemistry. 28: 15–38. doi:10.1146/annurev.bi.28.070159.000311. PMID 14432943.

== See also ==
- List of American spies
- John Abt
- Whittaker Chambers
- Noel Field
- Harold Glasser
- John Herrmann
- Alger Hiss
- Donald Hiss
- Victor Perlo
- J. Peters
- Lee Pressman
- Vincent Reno
- Julian Wadleigh
- Harold Ware
- Nathaniel Weyl
- Harry Dexter White
- Nathan Witt
