= Victor Perlo =

American Marxist economist (1912–1999)

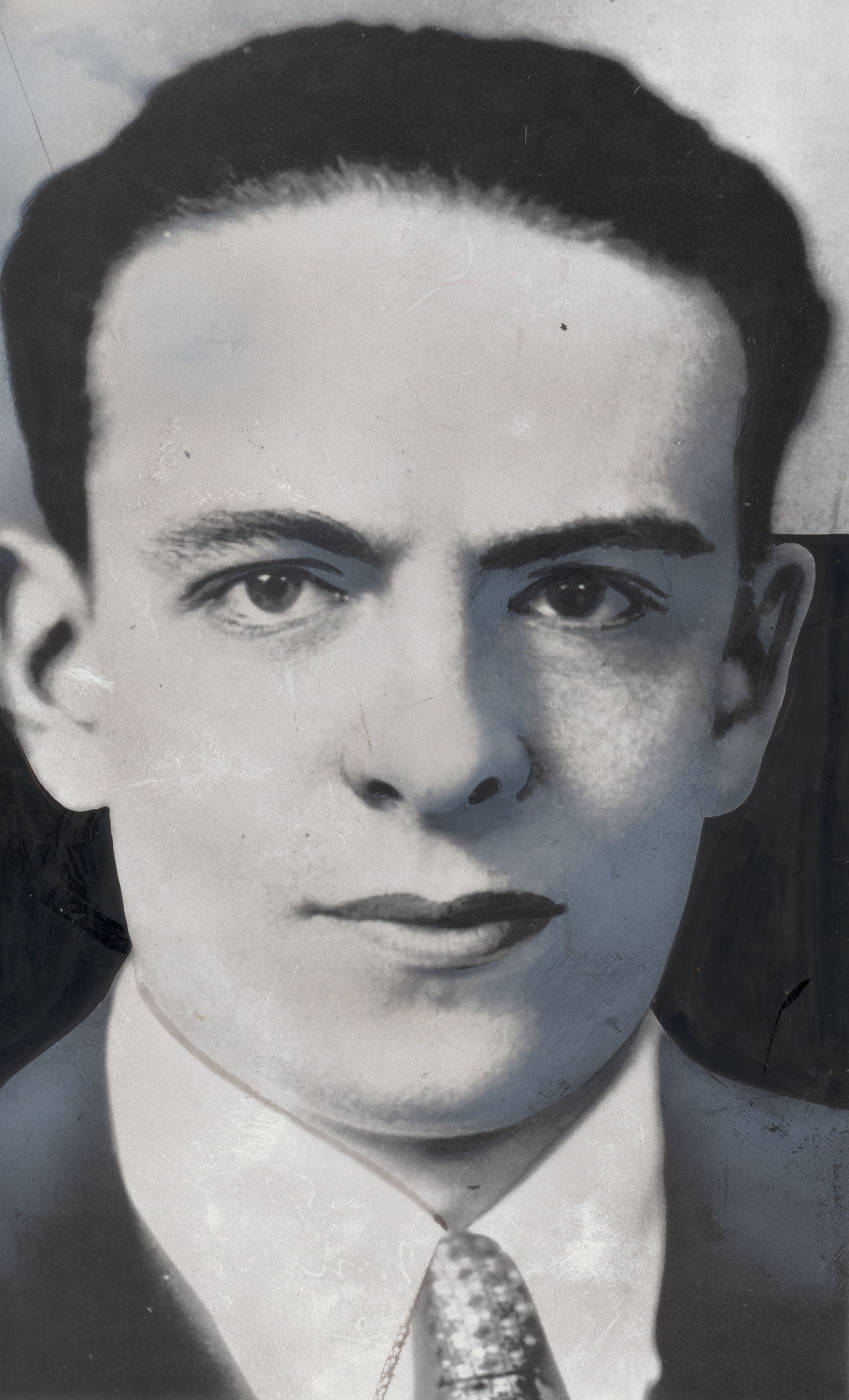
- Perlo c. 1948
- Born: May 15, 1912; New York City, U.S.
- Died: December 1, 1999 (aged 87); Croton-on-Hudson, New York, U.S.
- Education: Columbia College (B.A.); Columbia University GSAS (M.A.)
- Occupation: Statistical analyst
- Espionage activity
- Allegiance: Soviet Union
- Agency: CPUSA National Committee
- Operations: Ware group; Perlo group

Victor Perlo (May 15, 1912 – December 1, 1999) was an American Marxist economist, government functionary, and a longtime member of the governing National Committee of the Communist Party USA.

== Early life ==
Victor Perlo was born May 15, 1912, in East Elmhurst, Queens, New York City, N.Y. Perlo was the son of ethnic Jewish parents who had both emigrated in their youth to America from the Russian Empire. His father, Samuel Perlo, was a lawyer and his mother, Rachel Perlo, was a teacher.

Perlo received his bachelor's degree from Columbia University in New York City in 1931 and master's degree in mathematics from the same school in 1933.

Late in 1932 or early in 1933, while still a student at Columbia, Perlo joined the Communist Party USA, an organization with which he was affiliated throughout his life.

Perlo married his first wife, Katherine, in 1933 and divorced in 1943. Subsequently, he married his second wife, Ellen (whose uncle was Robert Menaker), with whom he remained for the rest of his life. The couple had three children, a girl and two boys.

Perlo had varied interests, which included tennis, mountain climbing, and chess. He was also a talented pianist.

== Governmental career ==
After his graduation from Columbia in 1933, Perlo went to work as a statistical analyst and assistant to a division chief at the National Recovery Administration (NRA), remaining at that post until June 1935. Perlo then moved to the Federal Home Loan Bank Board where he was an analyst for the Home Owners' Loan Corporation, establishing statistical analyses for properties mortgaged to the corporation and projecting long-term financial accounts. Perlo worked in that capacity until October 1937.

In October 1937, Perlo left government service to work in the Brookings Institution, a liberal think tank established in 1916, where he stayed as a researcher for more than two years. In November 1939, Perlo went to work in the US Department of Commerce, where he worked as a senior economic analyst in the Bureau of Foreign and Domestic Commerce.

Perlo moved to the Office of Price Administration (OPA) in November 1940, where he was head of the economic statistics division. There Perlo engaged in the study of inflationary pressures in the American economy, particularly with the advent of World War II, which helped provide documentation enabling the institution of price controls.

Perlo remained in that capacity until leaving to become head of the aviation section of the Bureau of Programs and Statistics at the War Production Board (WPB). Perlo's work at the WPB involved analysis of the various economic problems of aircraft production. In September 1944 he was made a special assistant to the director of the Bureau of Programs and Statistics of the WPB.

During his time in the federal bureaucracy, Perlo was a contributor to the Communist Party's press, submitting articles on economic matters under a variety of pseudonyms. He also secretly assisted I.F. Stone in gathering materials for various journalistic exposés.

About December 1945, Perlo went to the U.S. Treasury Department, where he worked in the Monetary Research department. There he was an alternate member of the Committee for Reciprocity Information, which took care of technical work relating to trade agreements under the Reciprocal Trade Agreement Act and doing preparatory work for the International Trade Organization.

Perlo left government service in 1947, when his loyalty was called into question during an investigation by the House Un-American Activities Committee. Perlo denied allegations that he had spied for the Soviet Union.

== Alleged espionage career ==
A dedicated Communist, Victor Perlo allegedly headed the Perlo group of Soviet espionage agents in the United States. Before World War II, Perlo had been a member of the Ware spy ring. The Perlo ring included several important U.S. officials, including a Senate staff director, and the ring supplied the Soviet Union with economic, political, and military intelligence, including United States aircraft production figures.

Perlo infiltrated through the United States Department of Commerce in 1938 to gather economic intelligence, and passed on intelligence concerning basic economic decisions he presented to Harry Hopkins, Secretary of Commerce. He transferred to the Division of Monetary Research, and served under Harry Dexter White, followed by Frank Coe and Harold Glasser, all of whom were later alleged to be Soviet agents.

== Career after government ==
In 1948, Perlo obtained a position as an economist for the Progressive Party, assisting the Presidential campaign of former U.S. Secretary of Agriculture and Vice President Henry Wallace. Following the publication of his book Economics of Racism, Victor Perlo received the Myers Center award for his exceptional work on intolerance in North America.

In 1968, he signed the "Writers and Editors War Tax Protest" pledge, vowing to refuse tax payments in protest against the Vietnam War. He was the Communist Party candidate for New York State Comptroller in the 1978 elections, coming in a distant fourth place with 0.39% of the vote.

== Death and legacy ==
He died on December 1, 1999, at his home in Croton-on-Hudson, New York. He was 87 years old at the time of his death.

Victor Perlo's papers are housed in the special collections department of Lewis J. Ort Library at Frostburg State University in Frostburg, Maryland.

== Works ==
=== Books and pamphlets ===
Note: Many of Perlo's works were translated into other languages, such as German, Russian, Polish, Czech, Japanese, Spanish, etc.

- Our Foreign Policy Costs One Million Jobs. Chicago: National Labor Conference for Peace, n.d. [c. 1949].
- American Imperialism. New York: International Publishers, 1951.
- Trends in the Economic Status of the Negro People. New York: Science and Society, n.d. [1952].
- Israel and Dollar Diplomacy. New York: New Outlook Publishers, 1953.
- The Negro in Southern Agriculture. New York: International Publishers, 1953.
- The Income 'Revolution.' New York: International Publishers, 1954.
- The Empire of High Finance. New York: International Publishers, 1957.
- USA and USSR: The Economic Race. New York: International Publishers, 1960.
- Dollars and Sense of Disarmament: Carl Marzani. Victor Perlo. With Carl Marzani. New York: Marzani and Munsell, 1960.
- How the Soviet Economy Works: An Interview with A. I. Mikoyan, First Deputy Prime Minister of the U.S.S.R. With Anastas Mikoyan. New York: International Publishers, 1961.
- Militarism and Industry: Arms Profiteering in the Missile Age. New York: International Publishers, 1963.
- Bitter End in Southeast Asia. With Kumar Goshal. New York: Marzani and Munsell, 1964.
- Marines in Santo Domingo! New York: New Outlook Publishers, 1965.
- The Vietnam Profiteers. New York: New Outlook Publishers, 1966.
- American Labor Today: How Has It Changed? Is It a Revolutionary Class? Are Marx's Views Still Valid? New York: New Outlook Publishers, 1968.
- The Dollar Crisis: What It Means to You. New York: New Outlook Publishers, 1969.
- Robbing the Poor to Fatten the Rich: Inflation, Wages, Prices and Profits. With Barry Cohen. New York: New Outlook Publishers, 1972.
- The Unstable Economy: Booms and Recessions in the United States Since 1945. New York: International Publishers, 1973.
- High Prices and High Profits: How They Affect Your Wages and Living Costs. New York: New Outlook Publishers, 1973.
- End Fascist Terror and US Imperialism in Chile! New York: New Outlook Publishers, 1974.
- The Economics of Oil Production. New York, American Institute for Marxist Studies, 1974.
- Economics of Racism USA: Roots of Black Inequality. New York: International Publishers, 1975.
- Dynamic Stability: The Soviet Economy Today. With Ellen Perlo. New York: International Publishers, 1980.
- History's Biggest Rip-Off: The Arms Budget Threat to Your Livelihood and Life. New York: New Outlook Publishers, 1980.
- Super Profits and Crises: Modern US Capitalism. New York: International Publishers, 1988.
- Belt-Tightening Time: But for Whom? New York: New Outlook Publishers, 1989.
- Economics of Racism II: The Roots of Inequality, USA. New York: International Publishers, 1996.
- People vs. Profits: Columns of Victor Perlo: Volume 1, The Home Front, 1961-1999. Edited by Ellen Perlo. New York: International Publishers, 2003.
- People vs. Profits: Columns of Victor Perlo: Volume 2, The USA and the World. Edited by Ellen Perlo. New York: International Publishers, 2006.

=== Articles ===
- "On the Distribution of Student's Ratio for Samples of Three Drawn from a Rectangular Distribution," Biometrika, vol. 25, no. 1/2 (May 1933), pp. 203–204.
- "The Investment-Factor Method of Forecasting Business Activity," With Richard V. Gilbert. Econometrica, Journal of the Econometric Society, vol. 10, no. 3/4 (July–October 1942), pp. 311–316.
- "New York as the Financial Center," Science & Society, vol. 19, no. 4 (Fall 1955), pp. 289–302.
- "'People's Capitalism' and Stock-Ownership," American Economic Review, vol. 48, no. 3 (June 1958), pp. 333–347.
- "The Revised Index of Industrial Production," American Economic Review, vol. 52, no. 3 (June 1962), pp. 496–512.
- "Notes on Marxian Economics in the United States: Comment," American Economic Review, vol. 56, no. 1/2 (March 1966), pp. 187–188.
- "Criminalization of African Americans," Political Affairs [New York], vol. 75, no. 2, (February 1996), pg. 18.

== Congressional testimony ==
- Hearings Regarding Communist Espionage in the United States Government (Alger Hiss Case), Part 1. Committee on Un-American Activities, US House of Representatives. Washington: US Government Printing Office, 1948; pp. 677–686; 693–701. —Testimony of August 9, 1948.
- Hearings, Interlocking Subversion in Government Departments — Part 7. Judiciary Committee Subcommittee to Investigate the Administration of the Internal Security Act and Other Internal Security Laws, US Senate. Washington: US Government Printing Office, 1950; pp. 383–459. —Testimony of May 12, 1953.

== See also ==
- Perlo group
- Soviet spies
- List of American spies
- John Abt
- Whittaker Chambers
- Noel Field
- Harold Glasser
- John Herrmann
- Alger Hiss
- Donald Hiss
- J. Peters
- Ward Pigman
- Lee Pressman
- Vincent Reno
- Julian Wadleigh
- Harold Ware
- Nathaniel Weyl
- Harry Dexter White
- Nathan Witt
