= American Russian Institute =

Communist front group

The American Russian Institute for Cultural Relations with the Soviet Union, previously known as the American Society for Cultural Relations with the Soviet Union and also called the Russian-American Institute, was identified by Attorney General of the United States Thomas C. Clark as a communist front group in 1947 and was so listed on the Attorney General's List of Subversive Organizations for 1948, in accordance with President Harry Truman's Executive Order 9835.

Among the members of the Executive Committee of the American Russian Institute was Edward C. Carter, chairman of Russian War Relief and the National Committee for Medical Aid to the Soviet Union and general secretary of the Institute of Pacific Relations.

Henry H. Collins, Jr., a member of the alleged communist spy network, the Ware Group, was its executive director in 1948.

== See also ==
- Henry Collins (official)
