= Nathaniel Weyl =

American economist (1910–2005)

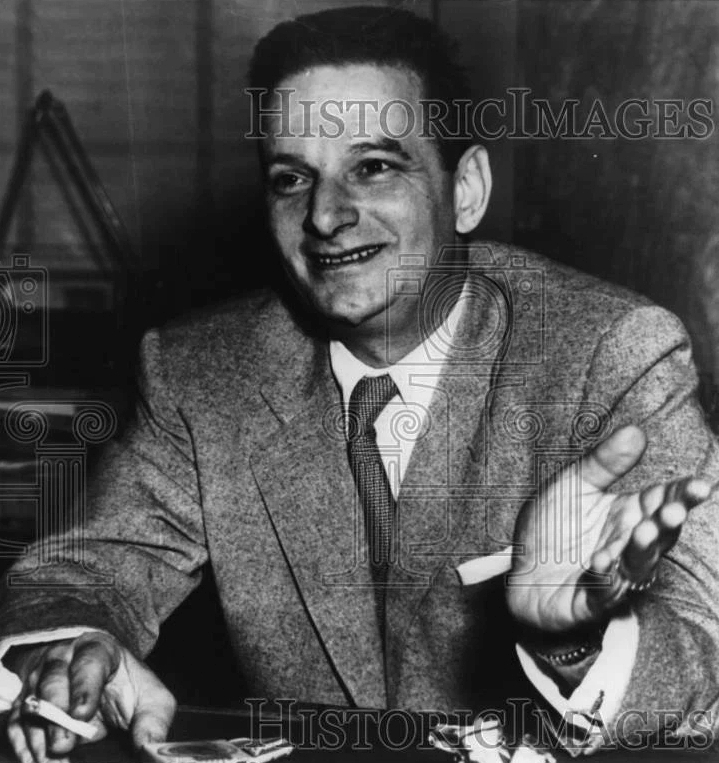
- Weyl in 1952
- Born: July 20, 1910; New York City, U.S.
- Died: April 13, 2005 (aged 94); Ojai, California, U.S.
- Education: Columbia University (undergraduate), London School of Economics (postgraduate)
- Years active: 1933-2003
- Employer(s): U.S. Government: Agricultural Adjustment Administration, Federal Reserve Board, Board of Economic Warfare
- Political party: Socialist Party of America, Communist Party USA
- Spouse(s): Sylvia Castleton Weyl (first), Marcelle Weyl (second)
- Children: Jonathan Weyl, Walter Weyl
- Parent(s): Bertha Nevin (née Poole), Walter Edward Weyl

Nathaniel Weyl (July 20, 1910 – April 13, 2005) was an American economist and author who wrote on a variety of social issues. A member of the Communist Party of the United States from 1933 until 1939, after leaving the party he became a conservative and avowed anti-communist. In 1952 he played a minor role in the Alger Hiss case.

== Early life ==
Weyl was born in New York City, the only child of Bertha Nevin (née Poole) and Walter Edward Weyl, a founder of The New Republic and a prominent progressive. His father was from a German Jewish family, and his mother, originally from Chicago, was from a Christian background.

Weyl received his Bachelor of Science Degree from Columbia College of Columbia University in 1931. There, he joined the Social Problems Club and "created the Morningside Heights branch of the Socialist Party, which covered Columbia, Barnard, and Union Theological Seminary ... soon ... the largest branch in the Party." He did postgraduate work at the London School of Economics, where instructors included Friederich Hayek on the right and Harold Laski on the left. He returned to Columbia for doctoral studies in economics in 1932 and became a leader of the "Communist-controlled" National Student Union. Edmund Stevens, like Weyl, was an editor of Student Review and convinced him to join the Communist Party.

Weyl described his position in the party in a manner that may indicate pre-positioning for underground work:

I was made a Member At Large (MAL) of the Party. This meant that I was not to express views which identified me as a Communist, not frequently to attend rallies or associate with known Communists, that I would not be a member of any unit, and would have to stay away from CP headquarters.

In 1933, he received an offer from Thomas Blaisdell to join the Agricultural Adjustment Administration as an economist. He joined the Ware group, a covert cell of Communists in Washington, DC. Some members of the Ware group engaged in espionage for the Soviet Union. Weyl described his Ware Group participation otherwise: "I was one of its less enthusiastic members." Also, he summarized its early activities (during his membership) as follows:

During the time I was a member, the secret Ware cell of the Communist Party did nothing at its meetings except engage in reverential discussion of Marxism–Leninism and of the world situation as perceived by the Comintern. ... Nothing that we were doing was secret from a national security standpoint. ... It did not occur to me that the Ware cell might be lured into the crime of espionage.

Weyl described what could be interpreted as Ware's efforts to corral him into espionage and his own effort to extract himself from the group:

Ware wanted me to try to get into the Foreign Service and be attached to the staff of William Bullitt, our first Ambassador to the Soviet Union. ... I didn't think there was anything illegal about membership in the Ware unit, but nevertheless it was duplicitous. I decided I must choose between being a government official and being a Communist. I made the wrong choice. I told Hal Ware that the Moscow idea was out and that I wanted to leave Washington and resign from government. He said: absolutely not. I forced his hand by committing an appalling breach of security. I showed up at a cell meeting with the girl I was having an affair with, a young lady who was not a Communist Party member and who had known nothing about the group. Ware withdrew his objections and I resigned from AAA.

Weyl spent 1934 and 1935 in New York, married Sylvia Castleton (whose mother, "Beatrice Carlin Stilwell, had been in and around the leadership of the CPUSA since its founding days"), and moved to Texas. Weyl worked with an oil company. His wife became "Organizational Secretary of the Texas–Oklahoma District of the CPUSA." In 1937, they returned to New York City, where Weyl worked as a financial reporter for the New York Post. In 1938, they wrote a book on Mexico, published by Oxford University Press. For Eugene Dennis, they helped prepare a draft program for a Popular Front organization in Brazil that the party intended to create to concern itself with Latin America. Dennis told them that the draft "would have to be submitted to the Comintern in Moscow." Weyl noted, "For us this was a sharp reminder of the fact that the American Party was merely a branch of a Soviet organization." The couple left the party in 1939, disheartened after the recent Hitler-Stalin Pact.

== Later life ==
After leaving the Communist party, Weyl contacted Paul Porter, an old Socialist Party friend and began to write a weekly column for Porter's Kenosha Labor. He considered joining forces with a new friend, Lewis Corey, as "we believed that American radicals must build some sort of new consensus, repudiating most of Marxist philosophy and economics, reaffirming democratic processes, and confronting the Soviet–Nazi bloc as an enemy." However, they disagreed on approach, Corey advocating formation of a new party, Weyl advocating "a loose political organization to work within the Democratic Party and influence it." Their alliance fell apart as the Weyls moved to Washington.

There, Weyl accepted a post as head of the Latin American research unit at the Federal Reserve Board and later moved to the Board of Economic Warfare. He served overseas in the Army for two years during World War II. After the war, he became a journalist and author and earned an income from investments.

In 1952, Weyl testified before the Senate Internal Security Committee that he had been a member of the Ware group, and that Alger Hiss had attended meetings as well. It was the only eyewitness corroboration of Whittaker Chambers's testimony that Alger Hiss was a Communist. However, it came two years after Hiss had been convicted of perjury, and Weyl never explained his failure to come forward as a witness in the Hiss trials.

Also in 1952, Weyl attended a loyalty board meeting in support of Mary Dublin Keyserling. Keyserling was accused of communist ties, in part through alleged connections to Weyl. Weyl spoke against this.

Weyl writings included studies of communism, especially in Latin America; espionage and internal security in the United States; racial, ethnic and class analyses of societies; and the roles of political and intellectual elites. Some of his writing has been published in eugenics journals and has espoused such views as blaming modern revolutionary movements on the "envy of non-achievers against creative minorities." Two of Weyl's books, Treason (1950) and Red Star Over Cuba (1961), received some critical interest and discussion in their times. Red Star Over Cuba postulates that Fidel Castro was a covert Communist before the Cuban Revolution and had been recruited by the Soviets while he was a teenager. The theory has not been widely accepted.

Weyl wrote for the National Review from the 1960s through the 1970s.

Weyl visited Rhodesia in 1966. During this visit, Weyl received IQ data from the Rhodesian government. Learning of Rhodesian government reports indicating a large number of white Rhodesian individuals having unusually high IQs, Weyl concluded in a journal article in Intelligence that high taxes and other economic hardships in "socialist Britain" were causing a brain drain to Rhodesia. This work was later cited in the 1994 book The Bell Curve by Charles Murray.

Following the release of Red Star Over Cuba, Weyl and John Martino, an activist against Castro, also actively promoted the story that Lee Harvey Oswald had been in Cuba prior to the assassination of John F. Kennedy, where he enjoyed contact with Cuban intelligence and Castro. Martino admitted that the story was fabricated shortly before dying, in 1975. Weyl ghostwrote Martino's memoir I Was Castro's Prisoner (1963). He also worked on a memoir of William D. Pawley, although it was never published.

Weyl's 1979 book Karl Marx - Racist contains a summary and critique of Marx's views on race and the role of Jews in modern capitalism, and a discussion of later refutations of Marx's economic views. At the same time, Weyl himself supported white minority-rule regimes in southern Africa against "communist terrorists" like Nelson Mandela, preferring the whites of Rhodesia, South Africa, and Portuguese colonial rule. Thinking that the struggle of Communist liberation movements was essentially destroyed by 1970, he published Traitor's End and intended the book to be the white anti-Communists' celebration of the supposed destruction of the black majority's liberation movements.

In his book “The Jew in American Politics” (1968, New Rochelle, N.Y., Arlington House) Nathaniel Weyl supported the control of Israel by Jews from the West, especially USA. This is on the claim that, otherwise, an underdeveloped race of Jews from Morocco, Middle East and Africa, who are, according to him, ethnically Arabs, will control the country.

Weyl was also an apologist for segregation at home. A supporter of racialist theories against miscegenation, Weyl wrote for the Mankind Quarterly for which Robert Gayre dubbed him a modern proponent of the anthropological ideas of the 19th-century eugenicist Sir Francis Galton. However, Weyl, unlike others in the magazine, allowed that marriage between races might be permissible in select instances. He had been writing for the magazine as early as 1960.

Weyl reportedly moderated his conservative views later in his life, and he supported Bill Clinton and John Kerry. He died in Ojai, California. Surviving him were sons Jonathan and Walter Weyl, stepdaughters, Georgianne Cowan (Charles Bernstein) and Jeanne Cowan (Barney Hass), three grandchildren and three great-grandchildren. His first wife, Sylvia Castleton, and second wife, Marcelle, had both died previously.

== Bibliography ==
=== Articles ===
- Weyl, Nathaniel (August 6, 2005). "Encouraging Bright Young Couples To Have More Children". Cosmotheism Today. Archived from the original on June 12, 2008.
- Weyl, Nathaniel (March 1967). "Envy And Aristocide". Intelligence, the MENSA Journal. Archived from the original on July 24, 2008.
- Weyl, Nathaniel (2003). "Encounters with Communism, 1932–1940". American Communist History. 2 (1): 81–94. doi:10.1080/1474389032000112618. S2CID 144718557.

=== Books ===
- Weyl, Nathaniel (1950). Treason: The Story of Disloyalty and Betrayal in American History. Public Affairs Press.
- Weyl, Nathaniel (1960). The Negro in American Civilization. Public Affairs Press.
- Weyl, Nathaniel (1961). Red Star Over Cuba, the Russian Assault on the Western Hemisphere. Arlington House. ISBN 978-0-8159-6705-7.
- Weyl, Nathaniel (1963). The Geography of Intellect (with Stefan Possony). Henry Regnery Company.
- Weyl, Nathaniel (1966). The Creative Elite in America. Public Affairs Press. ISBN 978-0-8183-0160-5.
- Weyl, Nathaniel (1968). The Jew in American Politics. Arlington House.
- Weyl, Nathaniel (1970). Traitors' End; The Rise and Fall of the Communist Movement in Southern Africa. Arlington House. ISBN 978-0-87000-082-9.
- Weyl, Nathaniel (1971). American Statesmen on Slavery and the Negro. Arlington House. ISBN 978-0-87000-117-8.
- Weyl, Nathaniel (1979). Karl Marx, Racist. Arlington House. ISBN 978-0-87000-448-3.
- Weyl, Nathaniel (1990). Geography of American Achievement. Scott-Townsend Publishers. ISBN 978-1-878465-00-9.
- Weyl, Nathaniel (2003). Encounters With Communism. Xlibris Corporation. ISBN 978-1-4134-0747-1.

== See also ==
- List of American spies
- John Abt
- Whittaker Chambers
- Noel Field
- Harold Glasser
- John Herrmann
- Donald Hiss
- Victor Perlo
- J. Peters
- Ward Pigman
- Lee Pressman
- Vincent Reno
- Julian Wadleigh
- Harold Ware
- Harry Dexter White
- Nathan Witt
