= Vincent Reno =

American mathematician, GRU agent (1911–1990)

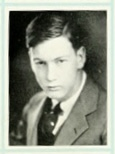
Victor Reno, later known as Franklin Vincent Reno (1911–1990), pictured 1932 in Coloradan yearbook

Franklin Vincent Reno (14 May 1911 – 1 May 1990) was a mathematician and civilian employee at the United States Army Aberdeen Proving Ground in Maryland in the 1930s. Reno was a member of the "Karl group" of Soviet spies which was being handled by Whittaker Chambers until 1938. Reno confessed in late 1948 to his espionage activities on behalf of the GRU. He is listed as number "118th" in the Gorsky Memo. Reno was sentenced to three years in prison.

== Biography ==
Reno was born in Salt Lake City, to a stock raiser and his wife from "Reno, Idaho" (likely Reno Ranch, Idaho). He attended Fort Collins High School from 1924 to 1928 and Colorado State College in Fort Collins from 1928 to 1929. He graduated from University of Colorado Boulder with "top honors" in mathematics in 1932. He was elected to Phi Beta Kappa in spring 1932 as Victor Reno. While doing graduate studies in astronomy at the University of Virginia in 1935 he joined the Communist Party under the name "Lance Clark." He then took a job at the national office of the Works Progress Administration, after which he resigned to become a Communist Party organizer in Maryland. He began working at Aberdeen Proving Ground in 1937 and continued there until his resignation in 1949. In 1945 he was "given the war department's gold medal for devising a complicated bomb table." He worked on the Norden bombsight and was said to have passed information on this device to Alger Hiss. In 1952 he pleaded guilty to not disclosing his Communist Party when he was being screened for the Aberdeen job. He was sentenced to three years in federal prison.

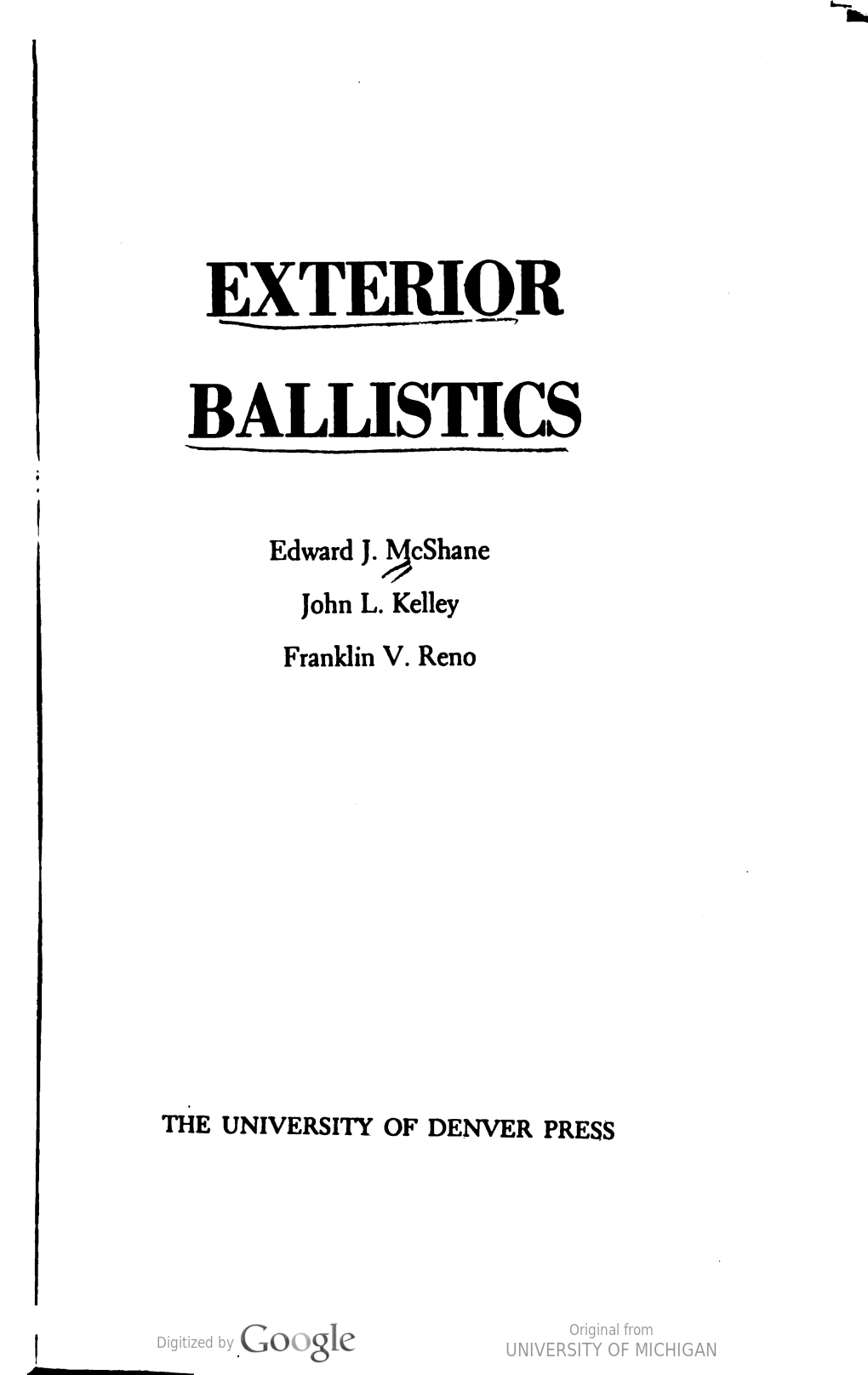
Title page of Exterior Ballistics McShane Kelley Reno (1954)

Reno also collaborated with Edward J. McShane of the University of Virginia and John L. Kelley of the University of California on a book called Exterior Ballistics. The judge gave Reno a month's delay in reporting for his sentence so he could finish his work on the book.

Reno died in 1990 at age 79.

== See also ==
- List of American spies
- John Abt
- Whittaker Chambers
- Noel Field
- Harold Glasser
- John Herrmann
- Alger Hiss
- Donald Hiss
- Victor Perlo
- J. Peters
- Ward Pigman
- Lee Pressman
- Julian Wadleigh
- Harold Ware
- Nathaniel Weyl
- Harry Dexter White
- Nathan Witt

== Sources ==
- Vassiliev, Alexander (2003), Alexander Vassiliev's Notes on Anatoly Gorsky's December 1948 Memo on Compromised American Sources and Networks
