= Julian Wadleigh =

Economist and Soviet spy (1904–1994)

Julian Wadleigh (1904–1994) was an American economist, Soviet spy and a Department of State official in the 1930s and 1940s. He was a key witness in the Alger Hiss trials.

== Background ==
Henry Julian Wadleigh was born in 1904. He went to an English "public" school, and then to the University of Oxford where he read classics and also the London School of Economics. He also studied at the University of Kiel in Germany. He returned to the United States where he received fellowships at the University of Chicago and the Brookings Institution. At the time of his death, Wadleigh was survived by a sister, Claire Hayes.

Wadleigh married Marion and had a daughter, Anne. They divorced then he married Edythe. Wadleigh and Edythe had 3 sons Jonathan, Larry, Robin.

== Career ==
In the early 1930s he started as an economist at the U.S. Department of Agriculture working in the Agricultural Adjustment Administration.

=== State Department ===
Becoming more involved with radical politics, he joined the Socialist Party. Later, he moved to the State Department, working in the trade agreements division and negotiating trade pacts in Turkey and Italy.

In the mid-1930s, he became acquainted with Eleanor Nelson, a communist. When Wadleigh, a committed socialist, expressed the desire to act against growing the fascist movement in Europe, Nelson put him in touch with communists in Washington. He passed along documents to the Soviet Union through his main contact, Whittaker Chambers, at the Washington Zoo.

The defection of Trotsky and subsequent purges in 1937, as well as Wadleigh's work abroad, resulted in infrequent contacts. Soon after, Chambers told him that he had quit the Communist Party, as they both were suspected of being Trotskyites and were in danger of being killed. In August 1939, Stalin signed a non-aggression pact with Hitler, which disgusted Wadleigh, who vowed to have nothing more to do with the communists.

Wadleigh stayed at the State Department in the 1940s but felt that his own career stalled because rumors lurked about his communist sympathies. He divorced and remarried around this time. After the Allies invaded Italy in 1943, he was sent to assess food security for the war-stricken population. He shared an apartment in Rome with his brother, Richard Wadleigh, an Army intelligence officer who had led the First Armored Division into the city.

=== Hiss Case ===
In 1948, Chambers accused Alger Hiss of being a communist spy. Wadleigh testified before a grand jury and the House Un-American Activities Committee (HUAC), and was a key witness in the Hiss prosecution. He did not actually know of Hiss's role, but served to corroborate the role Chambers played. He said he collaborated with communists, but never became a party member. He admitted taking classified documents while working in the State Department for Soviet intelligence. Wadleigh testified on the witness stand that he strongly believed his own transmission of papers to Chambers in the late 1930s "could not be used against us, but could be used against Germany and Japan." As federal prosecutor Thomas Murphy summed up, Wadleigh only wanted to stop the rise of fascism; "we all came to hate it, but he saw it earlier." Chambers detailed his espionage relationship to Wadleigh as well as events in the Hiss Case in his autobiography Witness (1952).

Testimony dates include December 9, 1948. Herman Greenberg of Greenberg, Forer & Rein was Wadleigh's legal counsel until shortly before he appeared before HUAC in December 1948.

== Confession of espionage ==
In an interview with The Washington Post in July 1949, Wadleigh admitted spying and that Chambers' testimony had been accurate. He said that he started spying in order to fight fascism but found increasing problems with Soviet efforts to enforce orthodoxy in science.

== Later life ==
At the time of the Hiss trial, the Wadleighs lived in Northern Virginia. They later moved to Massachusetts. His eldest daughter, Anne, cared for him later in life. Wadleigh died on April 23, 1994 in Atlanta, Georgia.

== See also ==
- List of American spies
- John Abt
- Whittaker Chambers
- Noel Field
- Harold Glasser
- John Herrmann
- Alger Hiss
- Donald Hiss
- Victor Perlo
- J. Peters
- Ward Pigman
- Lee Pressman
- Vincent Reno
- Harold Ware
- Nathaniel Weyl
- Harry Dexter White
- Nathan Witt
