= Lement Harris =

Lement Upham Harris
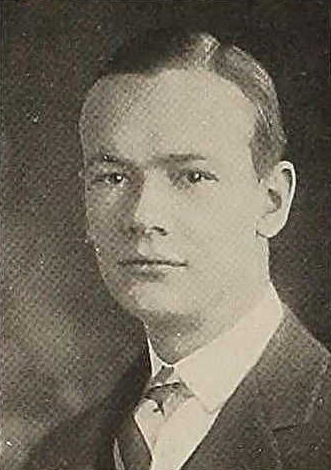
- Harris in the Harvard University yearbook, 1926
- Born: March 1, 1904
- Died: September 21, 2002 (aged 98)
- Education: Harvard University (1926)
- Parent: John Francis Harris

Lement Upham "Lem" Harris (March 1, 1904 – 21 September 2002) was a member of the American Communist Party.

== Biography ==
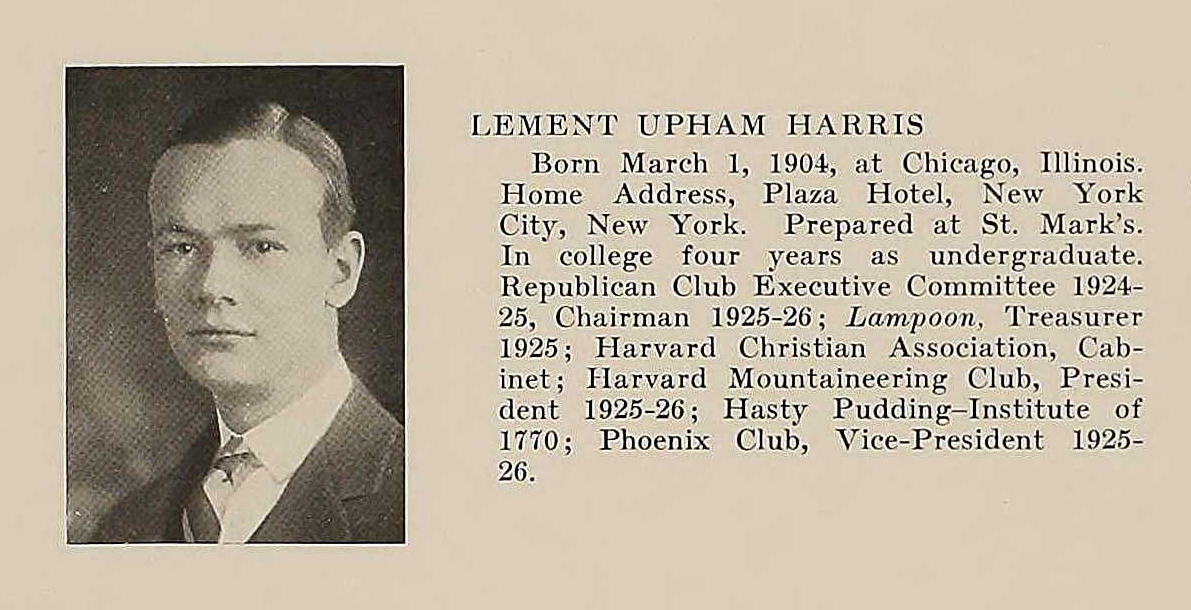
Harris in the Harvard University yearbook, 1926

Lement U. Harris, known to his friends as "Lem," was the son of John Francis Harris (c. 1875–1941), the founder of the Wall Street brokerage firm of Harris, Winthrop, and Company. He graduated from Harvard University in 1926.

Harris went to work on a farm in Pennsylvania for three years. During this time he read and was influenced by the works of Gandhi and Tolstoy. He came to know a fellow worker who had been a member of a trade union delegation to the Soviet Union, who introduced him to Harold Ware. who eventually invited Harris to Russia. Ware, was one of the American Communist Party's leading agricultural experts. He returned to the United States convinced that the Soviet system was superior to the West. Once back in the United States he conducted a nine-month survey of life in rural agricultural America. They published their results in The American Farmer. Harris then joined the Communist Party and remained a member until his death on September 21, 2002.

Lem Harris' papers reside at the University of Iowa in Iowa City.
