= Ware Group =

1930s Soviet espionage ring in the US

- Leaders: Harold Ware, Whittaker Chambers, reporting to J. Peters
- Dates active: 1933–1938
- Headquarters: New York City
- Active regions: United States with operations including Washington, DC
- Ideology: Communism
- Size: Unknown
- Part of: Soviet intelligence
- Wars: clandestine Soviet espionage

The Ware Group was a covert organization of Communist Party USA operatives within the United States government in the 1930s, run first by Harold Ware (1889–1935) and then by Whittaker Chambers (1901–1961) after Ware's accidental death on August 13, 1935.

== History ==
=== Background ===
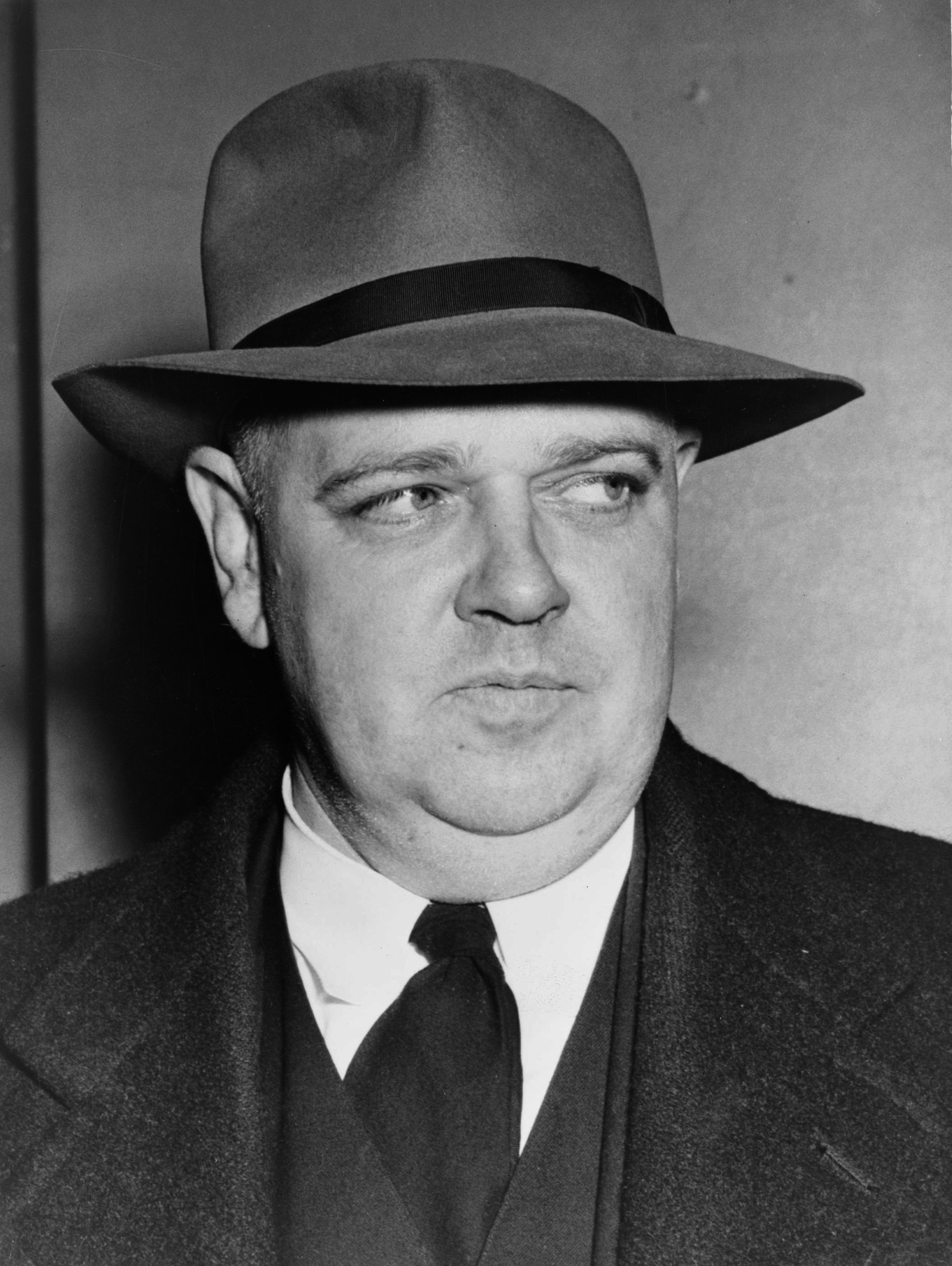
On August 3, 1948, Whittaker Chambers first testified before HUAC about the Ware Group

Harold Ware founded the group under the auspices of J. Peters by Summer 1933. Ware was a Communist Party (CPUSA) official working for the federal government in Washington, D.C.

The first known meeting of the Ware Group occurred in late 1933 with eight members: John Abt, Henry Collins, Alger Hiss, Victor Perlo, Lee Pressman, Nathaniel Weyl, and Nathan Witt.

Initially, Peters instructed that members make "exceptional money sacrifices" to the Party, study Marxist theory and Party doctrine, observe "strictest secrecy," and to obtain "any government documents" available to them. (Known members later claimed that it was merely a Marxist study group.)

=== Known active years ===
By 1934, the group had grown to some 75 members, divided into cells. Members initially joined Marxist study groups and then into activities on behalf of the Party. They shared a belief that Marxist ideologies were the correct way to approach the problems of the ongoing Great Depression. Chambers also stated that Ware could have been acting "pursuant to orders from the Central Committee of the Communist Party of the United States."

The Ware group started among young lawyers and economists hired by the Agricultural Adjustment Administration (AAA). This New Deal agency reported to the Secretary of Agriculture but was operated independently of Department of Agriculture bureaucracy. All the members of the Ware Group were dues paying members of the Communist Party. J. Peters considered the Ware Group one of his major sources of income. Nathaniel Weyl felt that members of the Ware Group were acquiring "the training in the complex business of running a state that would be in high demand and short supply when the United States chose Socialism" and that "in a Communist regime they would be poised to move to the head of the table."

Ware died in an automobile accident near Harrisburg, Pennsylvania, in August 1935. J. Peters, who had introduced Whittaker Chambers to Harold Ware the year before, placed Chambers in charge of the Ware Group.

Chambers claimed that members of the group joined other "apparatuses" under his leadership.

The group may have folded as such upon Chambers' defection from the Soviet underground in 1938. Some members seemed to have joined other groups, as attested by Elizabeth Bentley, including Victor Perlo and George Silverman.

== Hiss case ==
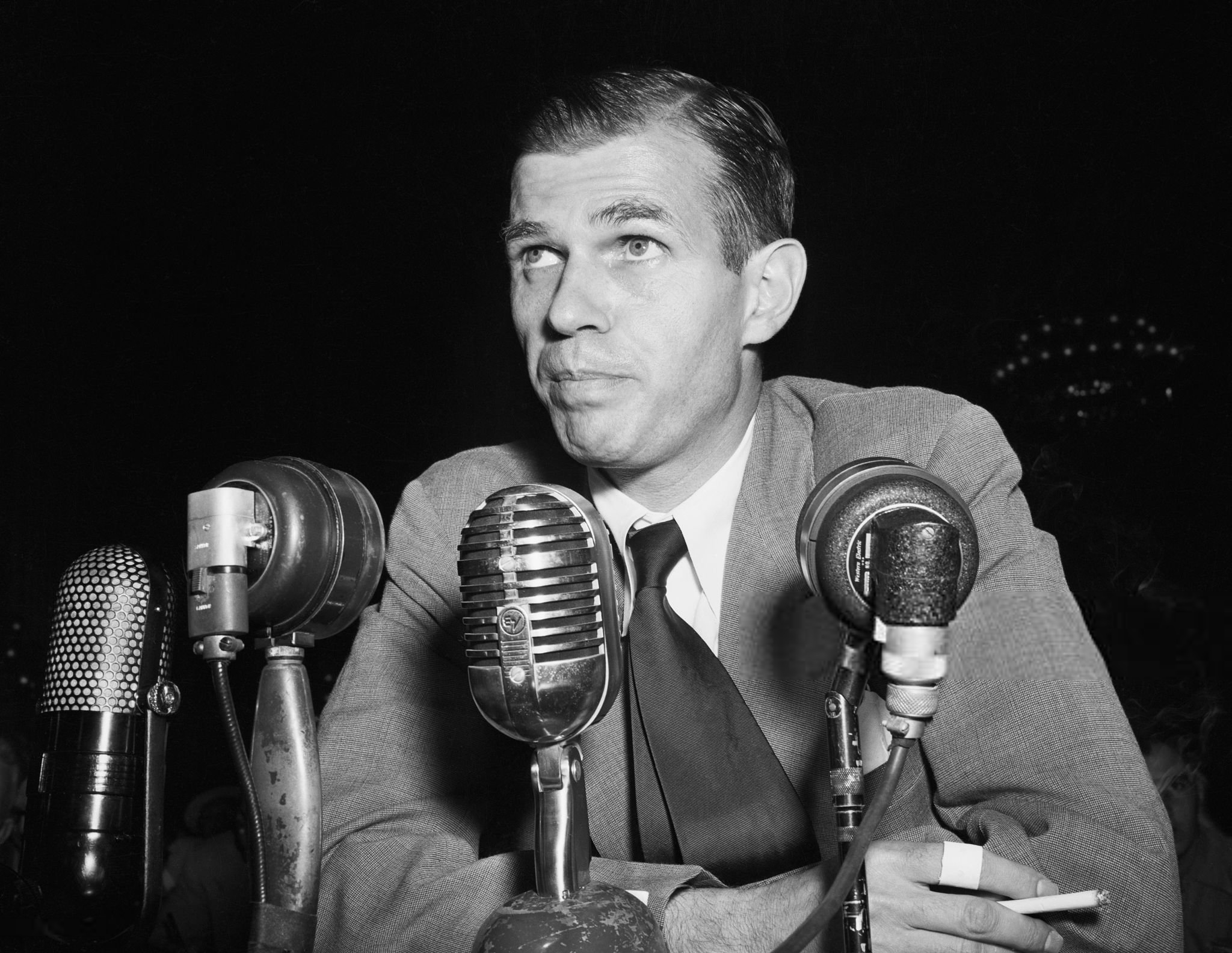
Alger Hiss testifying (1948)

On July 31, 1948. Bentley testified before the House Un-American Activities Committee (HUAC) regarding those Soviet spy rings of which she was aware. She named Chambers as someone who might corroborate. On August 3, 1948, Chambers testified under subpoena before HUAC about the existence of what he called the "Ware Group".

During August 1948, the only remaining member who continued to face serious investigation was Alger Hiss, who was convicted in January 1950 on two counts of perjury.

== Corroboration ==
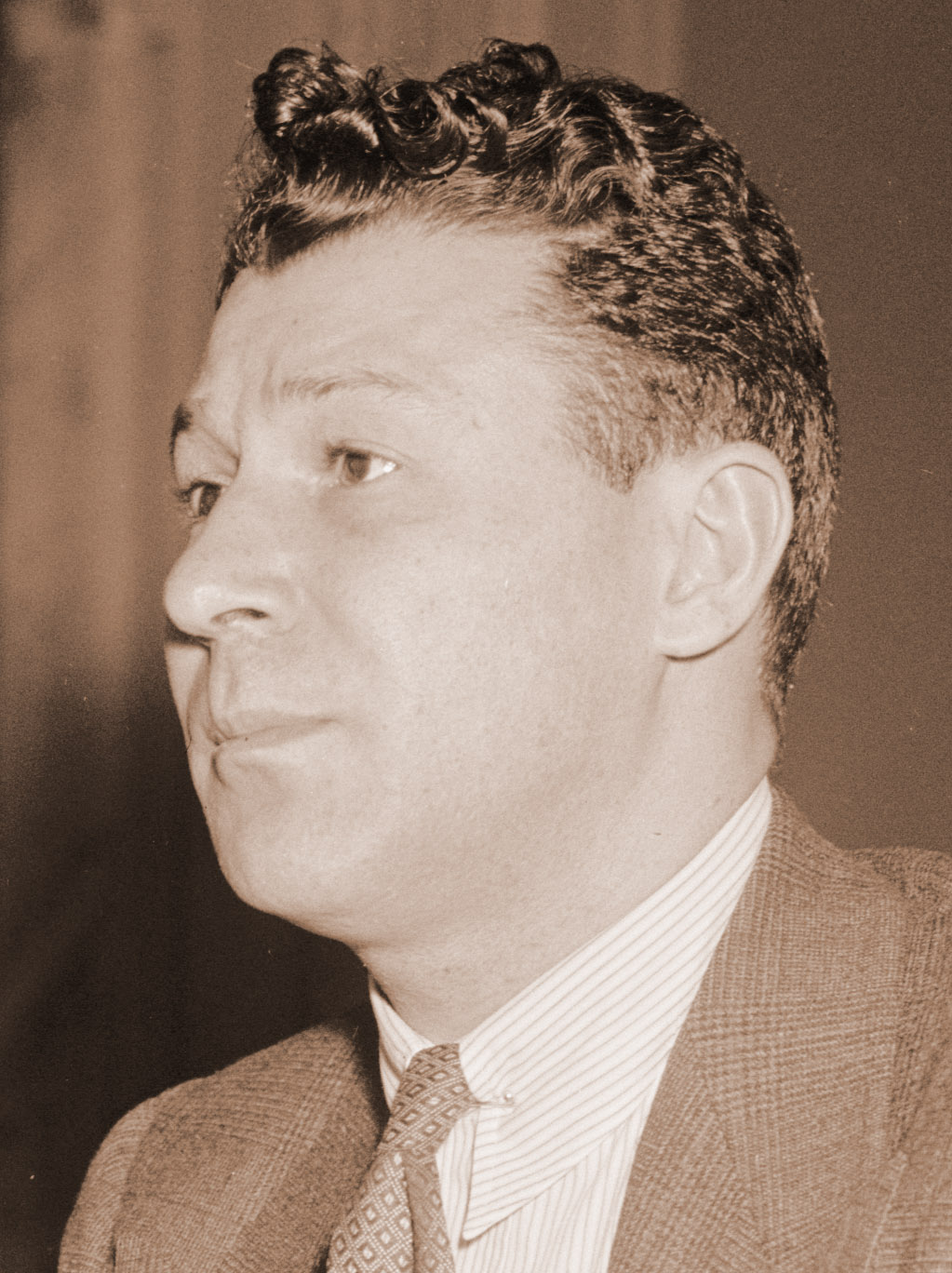
Lee Pressman during testimony to a U.S. Senate subcommittee (March 24, 1938)

In the early 1950s, two members corroborated at least some of Chambers' account:

- 1950: Lee Pressman: Testified to Congress and confirmed his membership in the Ware Group, though denied that Hiss was a member.
- 1952: Nathaniel Weyl: Also testified and confirmed his membership in the group, as well as saying that Hiss had been a fellow member.

By 1958, Stanford University professor Herbert L. Packer noted that "the others named as members of the Ware group have consistently invoked the fifth amendment when questioned about Communist affiliations."

Packer also noted that "Hiss obliquely recognizes the fact of the Ware group's existence, but relies on the post-trial testimony of Pressman to establish that he was not a member. Indeed, that testimony was one of the grounds relied on in his motion for new trial."

During the 1990s, two more members admitted their membership in respective memoirs:

- 1993: John Abt: Wrote in his memoirs that the Ware Group was a Communist Party unit and that he had been a member.
- 1994: Hope Hale Davis: Acknowledged in her memoir that the Ware Group was a CPUSA unit and that she had known most of the people Chambers had named as fellow Communists and unit members.

== Members ==
Alleged members of the Ware Group included:

- J. Peters
- Harold Ware
- Whittaker Chambers
- John Abt
- Lee Pressman
- George Silverman
- Victor Perlo
- Alger Hiss
- Charles Kramer
- Nathan Witt
- Henry Collins
- Marion Bachrach
- John Herrmann
- Nathaniel Weyl
- Donald Hiss
- Hope Hale Davis

Harry Dexter White, then Director of the Division of Monetary Research in the United States Department of the Treasury, was also allegedly affiliated with the group.

== Legacy ==
In 1958, Packer recommended "...Inquiry should also extend to the loose ends. Each of the persons named by Chambers as a member of the Ware group should be required to tell what he knows."

Such inquiry has not occurred to date, though in 2011 Thomas L. Sakmyster's book Red Conspirator about J. Peters included extensive discussion about the Ware Group.

== See also ==
- Harold Ware
- J. Peters
- Whittaker Chambers
- Nathan Witt
- John Abt
- Lee Pressman
- Alger Hiss
- George Silverman
- Victor Perlo
- Hope Hale Davis
- Elizabeth Bentley

== Sources ==
- Chambers, Whittaker (1952). Witness. New York: Random House. pp. White on 29, 40, 67–68, 69, 70, 334, 370 383–384, 386, 405, 414–416, 419–421, 423, 426, 427, 429–432, 442, 470, 492, 500, 510–512, 544, 554, 600–, handover from Ware to Chambers on 31, 204, 332–348, 350, 352, 361, 370, 377, 378, 467, 542, 543, 552, 553, 624, 685, 686. LCCN 52005149.
- Davis, Hope Hale (1994). Great Day Coming. Hanover NH: Steerforth Press. ISBN 978-1-8836-4217-4.
- Sakmyster, Thomas L. (2011). Red Conspirator: J. Peters and the American Communist Underground. University of Illinois Press. pp. 75–92, 94–97, 104, 119, 131, 138, 146, 175. ISBN 9780252035982.
