= Rudy Baker =

American spy for the Soviet Union

Rudy Baker (born 1898, date of death unknown), a Communist Party USA (CPUSA) official, is today best known for his role as head of the CPUSA's underground secret apparatus. He succeeded to the position in 1938, after the removal of J. Peters.

== Background ==
Baker was born in 1898 in Vukovar, Kingdom of Croatia-Slavonia, Austria-Hungary (modern-day Croatia), probably under the name Rudolph Blum. Baker had little formal education, and emigrated to the United States with his family in 1909. He joined the Communist Party of the United States at its founding, in 1919. He went to Moscow and trained at the International Lenin School from 1927 to 1930. He became a member of the Communist Party of the Soviet Union during that period.

== Identification in VENONA Soviet Cables ==
Baker shows up in the Venona project decryptions of Soviet codes under the cover name SON; he may also be RUDI. The identification comes from coded correspondence between the Comintern and the party in Russia's RTsKhIDNI archive (495-184), which contains dozens of messages from BROTHER in Moscow to FATHER and SON in the United States. Annotations on these messages identify BROTHER as Dimitrov and FATHER as the party General Secretary Earl Browder. In these messages, SON is the head of the party's covert arm or secret apparatus, which Baker took over in mid-1938 after the defection of Whittaker Chambers. Notably, all of the Comintern messages to SON were sent after Baker visited Moscow in January 1939 to brief Comintern officials on the status of the party's secret apparatus (after Baker took over its operations).

In May 1942, General Pavel Fitin, the head of KGB foreign intelligence directorate states in a message to Dimitrov found in the Comintern Archives, "We are forwarding a telegram we received from New York addressed to you from Rudy"; this telegram is signed SON.

== Sources ==
- John Earl Haynes, Russian Archival Identification of Real Names Behind Cover Names in VENONA, Cryptology and the Cold War, Center for Cryptologic History Symposium, (October 27, 2005)
- John Earl Haynes and Harvey Klehr, Venona: Decoding Soviet Espionage in America (New Haven: Yale University Press, 1999). ISBN 0-300-08462-5
- Fridrikh Igorevich Firsov and Harvey Klehr, The Secret World of American Communism (New Haven: Yale University Press, 1996). ISBN 0-300-06855-7.
