= Boris Bukov =

Soviet spy

Boris Yakovlevich Bukov, also Boris Bykov ("Sasha") Regiment Commissar (15 November 1935) was a member of the Communist Party from 1919. Bykov was head of the underground apparatus with which Whittaker Chambers and Alger Hiss were connected.

== Early career ==
Bykov graduated from Commanders' Upgrading Training School of Razvedupr of the Red Army Staff in 1929. He received further training at the Red Army Military Academy of Chemical Defense, the Military-Industrial Department (September 1932 - February 1935), and the Red Army Stalin Military Academy of Mechanization and Motorization. As he was fluent in German, Bykov served as an Officer of Soviet Military Intelligence (GRU) from 1920-1941, working in Germany. In 1928 Bykov became the section chief of the 2nd Department of the Razvedupr; later he was appointed Assistant Chief of the 2nd Department of the Razvedupr.

== Soviet illegal resident ==
In 1935 Bukov left abroad was a resident spy of Razvedupr in the United States from 1936 to 1939. After leaving the United States, he became a Lecturer (agent-operation cycle) of the Higher Special School of the Red Army Staff from July 1939 to September 1940, followed by a post as Senior Teacher of the chair of intelligence from September 1940 to June 1941.
