= John Herrmann =

American writer

- Born: John Theodore Herrmann; November 9, 1900; Lansing, Michigan, U.S.
- Died: April 9, 1959 (aged 58); Mexico
- Resting place: Mount Hope Cemetery; Lansing, Michigan, U.S.
- Education: George Washington University; University of Michigan; Ludwig-Maximilians-Universität München; Mexico City College
- Occupation: Writer
- Spouses: Josephine Herbst (div. 1940) Ruth Tate (m. 1940)
- Children: 1

John Theodore Herrmann (November 9, 1900 – April 9, 1959) was a writer in the 1920s and 1930s and is alleged to have introduced Whittaker Chambers to Alger Hiss.

== Biography ==
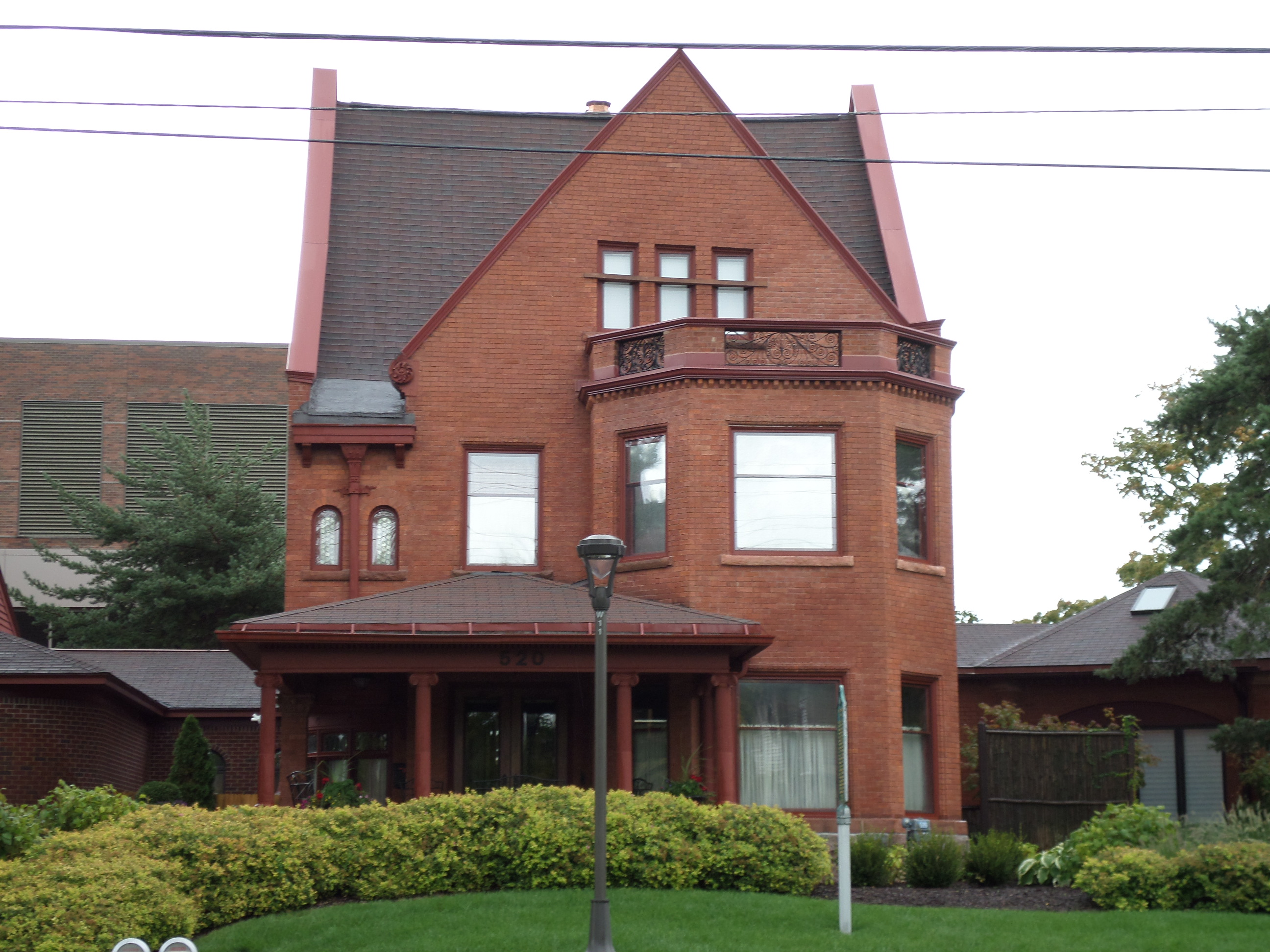
Herrmann House in Lansing

Herrmann was born in Lansing, Michigan in 1900. He lived in Paris in the 1920s, as part of its famous expatriate American writers' circle, when he met his first wife, Josephine Herbst in 1924. Herbst enjoyed more success as a writer than Herrmann; the couple lived a few years in rural Pennsylvania, and were friends with Katherine Anne Porter, Ernest Hemingway, John Dos Passos, William Carlos Williams, and others.

Herrmann's first novel, What Happens, was original published in Paris by Robert McAlmon's Contact Editions press. Copies were seized by U.S. Customs upon their arrival in the United States on the charge of violating the 1922 Tariff Act, which banned the import of obscene materials from foreign countries. Herrmann fought the charge in a jury trial in New York City in October 1927 but ultimately lost. Despite supporters such as Genevieve Taggard, H.L. Mencken, and Katharine Anne Porter, the jury responded with a negative verdict, and the judge ordered the seized copies destroyed.

After returning to Michigan in 1924, Herrmann wrote a manuscript about anti-German backlash during World War I but was unable to get it published. Researcher Sara Kosiba found the manuscript in the Harry Ransom Center at the University of Texas at Austin and arranged to have it published in 2018 under the title "Foreign Born".

In 1932, Herrmann's short novel, "The Big Short Trip", tied with Thomas Wolfe for the Scribner's Magazine short novel prize.

In 1934, he went to work with Harold Ware and his organization Farm Research, Inc., which worked with the Agricultural Adjustment Administration. Herrmann soon was a part of the Ware group, a secret apparatus of the CPUSA and Comintern in Washington, D.C., which supplied classified information to Soviet intelligence. From early 1934 until the summer of 1935, Herrmann was a paid courier for the CPUSA, delivering material emanating from the secret cells of sympathetic government employees being cultivated by Hal Ware to New York City. Herrmann also was the person who introduced Whittaker Chambers to Alger Hiss.

In 1940, Herrmann divorced Herbst and married Ruth Tate. He served in the United States Coast Guard, enlisting in New Orleans, in World War II. The couple fled the country and went to Mexico, when the FBI's Hiss-investigations began. He was placed under surveillance and questioned many times in Mexico by the FBI.

Herrmann applied in March 1949 to Mexico City College (MCC) as a speech and drama major but attended for only the Fall 1950 and Winter 1951 quarters. A photograph in the November 16, 1950, issue of MCC's student paper, the Collegian, shows Earl Sennett speaking to twelve students in his "Studio Stages" drama group; among them are Frank Jeffries, Alice Hartman, and John Herrmann. During his time at MCC, Herrmann was also, according to James W. Grauerholz's 2002 investigation, in an apartment located at 122 Monterrey hours before William Burroughs shot and killed his wife Joan Vollmer Burroughs.

== Death ==
Herrmann died near the Pacific Ocean in April 1959, at the Hotel Navidad, in Barra de Navidad, Jalisco, Mexico from a heart attack. He is buried at Mount Hope Cemetery in Lansing, Michigan.

== Publications ==
=== Books ===
- What Happens. Contact Editions, Paris 1926 (reissued 2015 by Hastings College Press, with new introduction by Sara Kosiba)
- Foreign Born. Hastings College Press, 2018.
- Summer is Ended (1932)
- The Salesman (1939)

=== Other publications by John Herrmann ===
"The Big Short Trip." Scribner's Magazine August 1932, p. 65-69, 113–128.
