= Donald Hiss =

American lawyer (1906–1989)

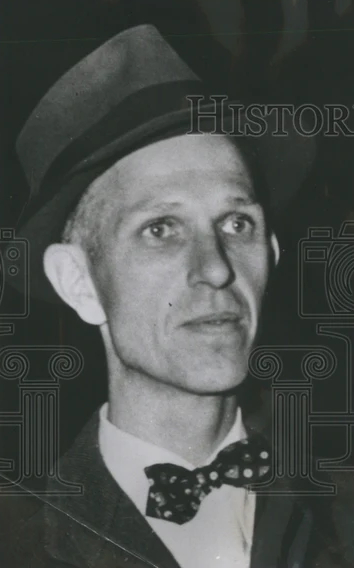
- Hiss in 1954
- Born: December 15, 1906; Baltimore, Maryland, U.S.
- Died: May 18, 1989 (aged 82); St. Michaels, Maryland, U.S.
- Education: Johns Hopkins University; Harvard Law School
- Occupations: lawyer, government official
- Employer(s): Agricultural Adjustment Administration (1933–1935), U.S. Department of State (1936–1945), Covington & Burling (1945–1976)
- Political party: Democratic
- Spouse: Catherine G. Jones (1929–1996)
- Children: 3
- Relatives: Alger Hiss, brother Anna Hiss, sister

Donald Hiss (December 15, 1906 – May 18, 1989), also known as "Donie" and "Donnie", was the younger brother of Alger Hiss. Donald Hiss's name was mentioned during the 1948 hearings wherein his more famous and older brother, Alger, was accused of spying for the Soviet Union, and two years later convicted of perjury before the House Un-American Activities Committee (HUAC).

== Early life ==
Donald Hiss was born on December 15, 1906, in Baltimore, Maryland. He graduated from Johns Hopkins University and Harvard Law School.

== Career ==
=== Early career: government ===
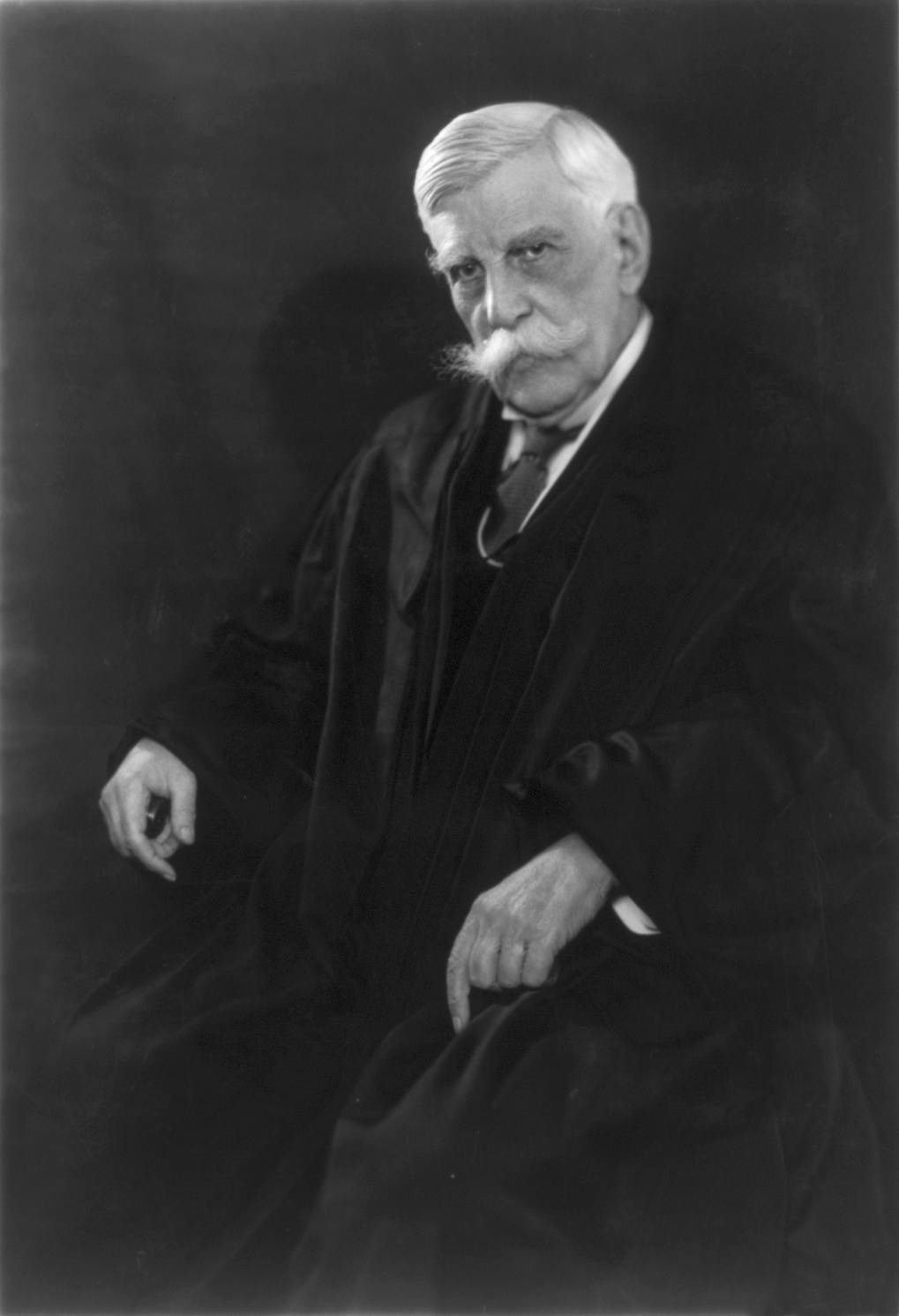
Oliver Wendell Holmes Jr.

In 1932, he was a law secretary to Associate Justice Oliver Wendell Holmes of the United States Supreme Court. From 1933 to 1935, he was employed by the Agricultural Adjustment Administration of the United States Department of Labor. In 1934, he was also attached to a special U.S. Senate committee investigating the munitions industry. In 1935, he was employed as a special attorney by the United States Department of Justice.

On September 18, 1936, he was appointed an assistant to the Assistant Secretary of State and worked in the State Department throughout World War II. In 1945, he joined the law firm of Covington & Burling.

=== Hiss Case ===
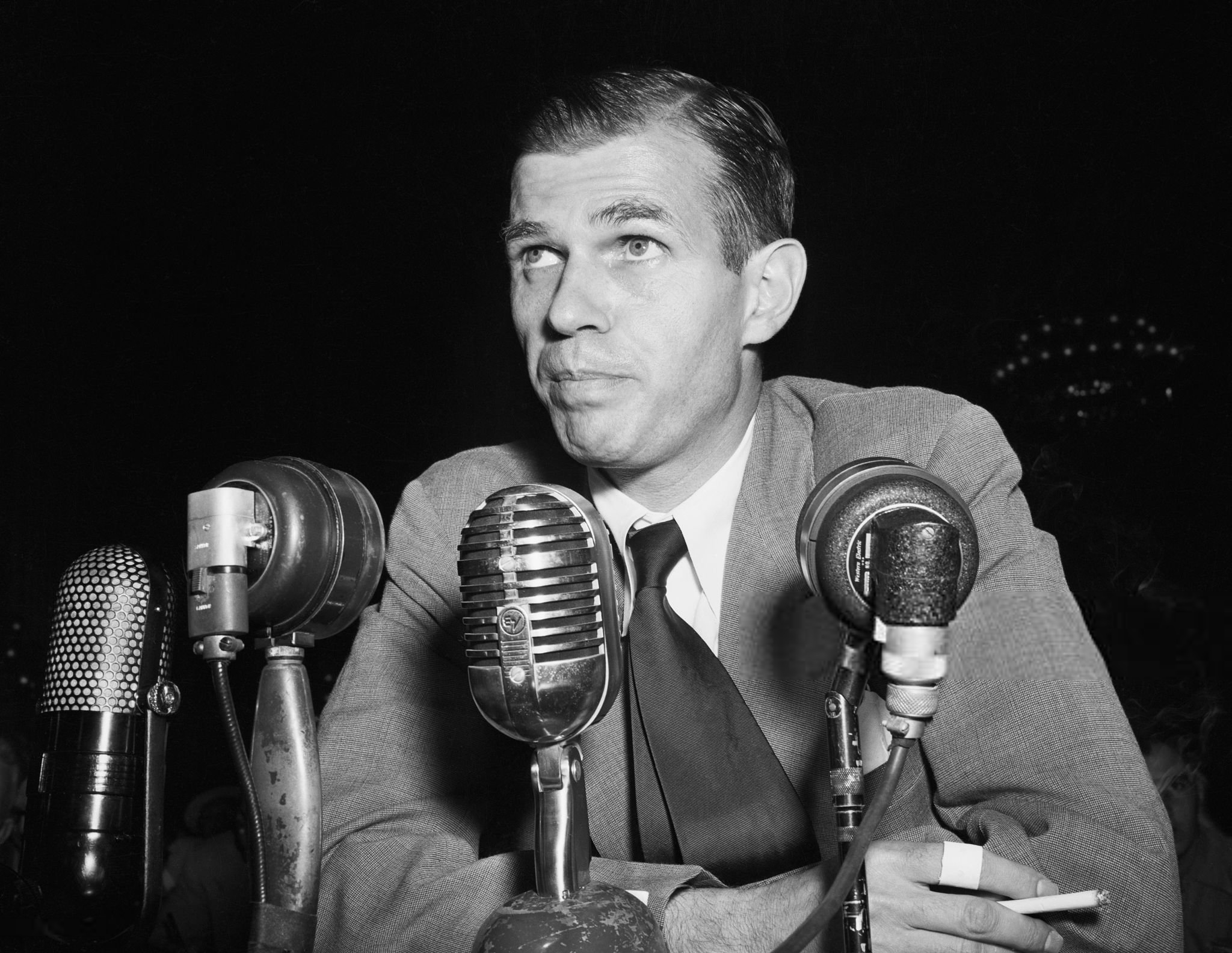
Alger Hiss, brother of Donald Hiss, in 1948

On August 3, 1948, Whittaker Chambers included the name of Donald Hiss along with his brother Alger and more than half a dozen other former Federal officials as members of the Ware Group and of the Communist Party when testifying under subpoena to HUAC.

On August 7, 1948, Chambers stated to the committee, "I can give you the general impression. He was much less intelligent than Alger. Much less sensitive than his brother."

Hiss retained Nebraskan Hugh Cox as counsel. Cox was famous as Thurman Arnold's chief deputy," as an early partner at Root Clark & Bird (later Root, Clark, Buckner & Ballantine; later Dewey Ballantine, later Dewey & LeBoeuf) and fellow attorney with Hiss at Covington & Burling, where he was called the "perfect advocate") during the Hiss-Chambers Case."

On August 13, 1948, like his brother and Harry Dexter White, Hiss denied the allegation, stating:

I flatly deny every statement made by Mr. Chambers with respect to me. I am not, and never have been, a member of the Communist Party or of any formal or informal organizations affiliated with, or fronting in any manner whatsoever for, the Communist Party. In fact, the only organizations and clubs to which I have belonged are the local Y.M.C.A., the Miles River Yacht Club of Maryland, the old Washington Racquet Club, the Harvard Law School Association, the American Society of International Law, and college fraternities and athletic clubs.

I have no recollection of ever having met any person by the name of D. Whittaker Chambers, nor do I recognize his photograph which I have seen in the public press. I am not and never have been in sympathy with the principles of the Communist Party ... I have never known that man by the name of Chambers, Carl, or any other name...
If I am lying, I should go to jail, and if Mr. Chambers is lying, he should go to jail."

Unlike his brother Alger, Donald was never indicted.

=== Later career: private law ===
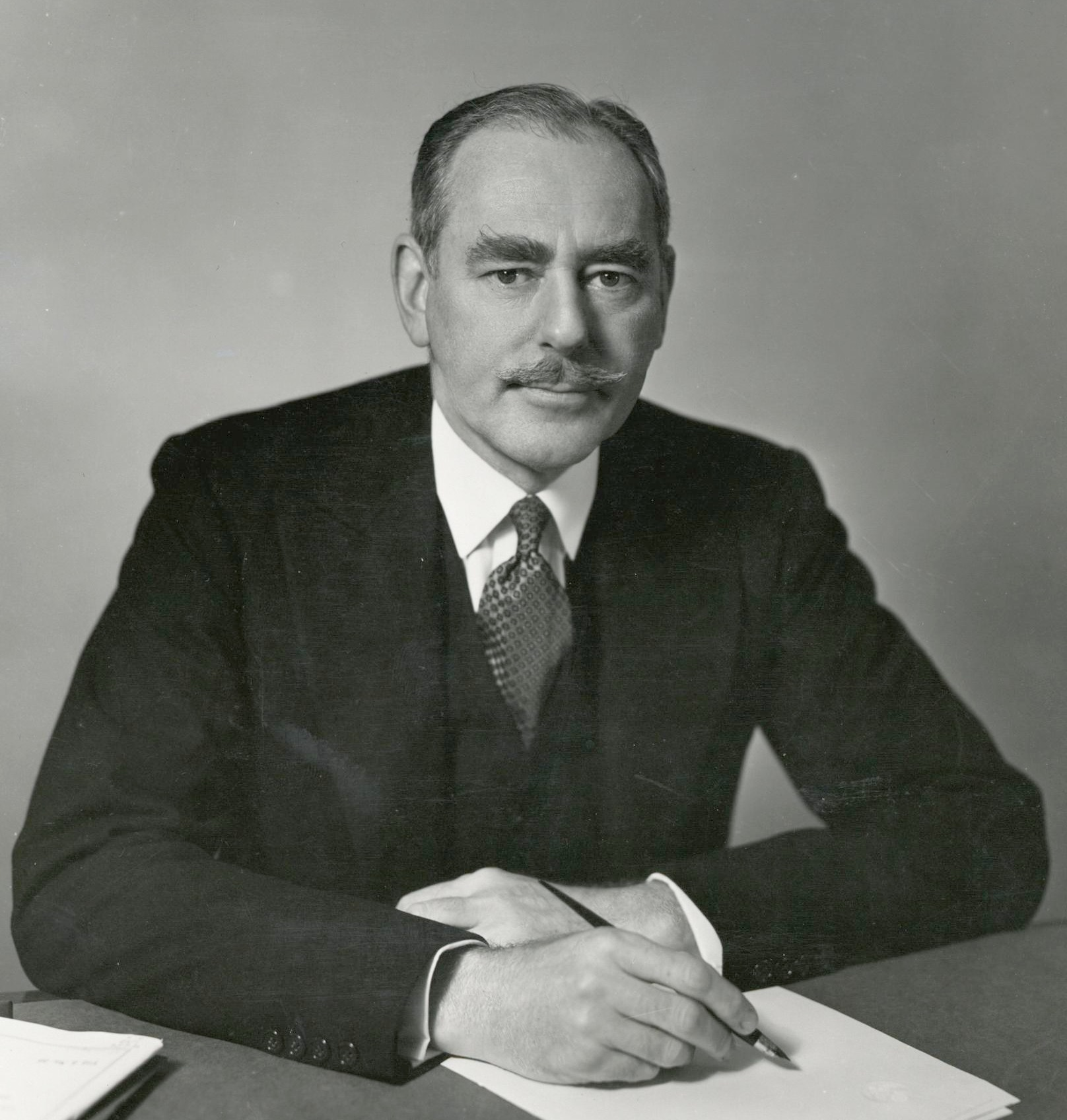
Dean Acheson.

Donald Hiss spent the remainder of his career in private law practice with Covington & Burling. His expertise lay in international trade and tariff law. He taught international law at Catholic University and at the Johns Hopkins School of Advanced International Studies.

He retired in 1976. Dean Acheson, who famously defended the reputation of Alger Hiss, was also a member of Covington & Burling.

== Death ==
Hiss died of lung cancer on May 18, 1989, in St. Michaels, Maryland.

== See also ==
- List of American spies
- List of Eastern Bloc agents in the United States
- List of law clerks for the second seat of the Supreme Court of the United States
