= Shemitz (surname) =

Shemitz is an uncommon surname in the United States of America.

This surname is also affiliated to the lineages of "Hutter", "Schieffelin", "Rosen", "Rottman", "Chambers", and "Scharmett".

- Esther Shemitz (1900–1986), American painter, witness in Hiss-Chambers Case
- Julie Shemitz (born 1956), Assistant U.S. attorney, Central District of California
- Reuben Shemitz (1894–1970), American attorney, witness in Hiss-Chambers Case
- Gregory Shemitz (born 1960), Independent photojournalist, famous contributions
- Sylvan Shemitz (1925–2007), American lighting designer, Sylvan R. Shemitz Designs
- Allison Shemitz (born 1961), Chairman of Lighting Quotient Designs, architectural lighting
- Jon Shemitz (born 1958), Author and software engineer, publications for .NET Ecosystem
- Leigh Shemitz (born 1964), Environmental research management, president of Soundwaters
- Ellen Shemitz (born 1961), Human rights commissioner, Worcester Human Rights Commission
- Howard Shemitz (born 1957), Instructor of Penn State University, president in Integrated Asset Management
