= Whittaker Chambers =

American defected communist spy, writer, editor (1901–1961)

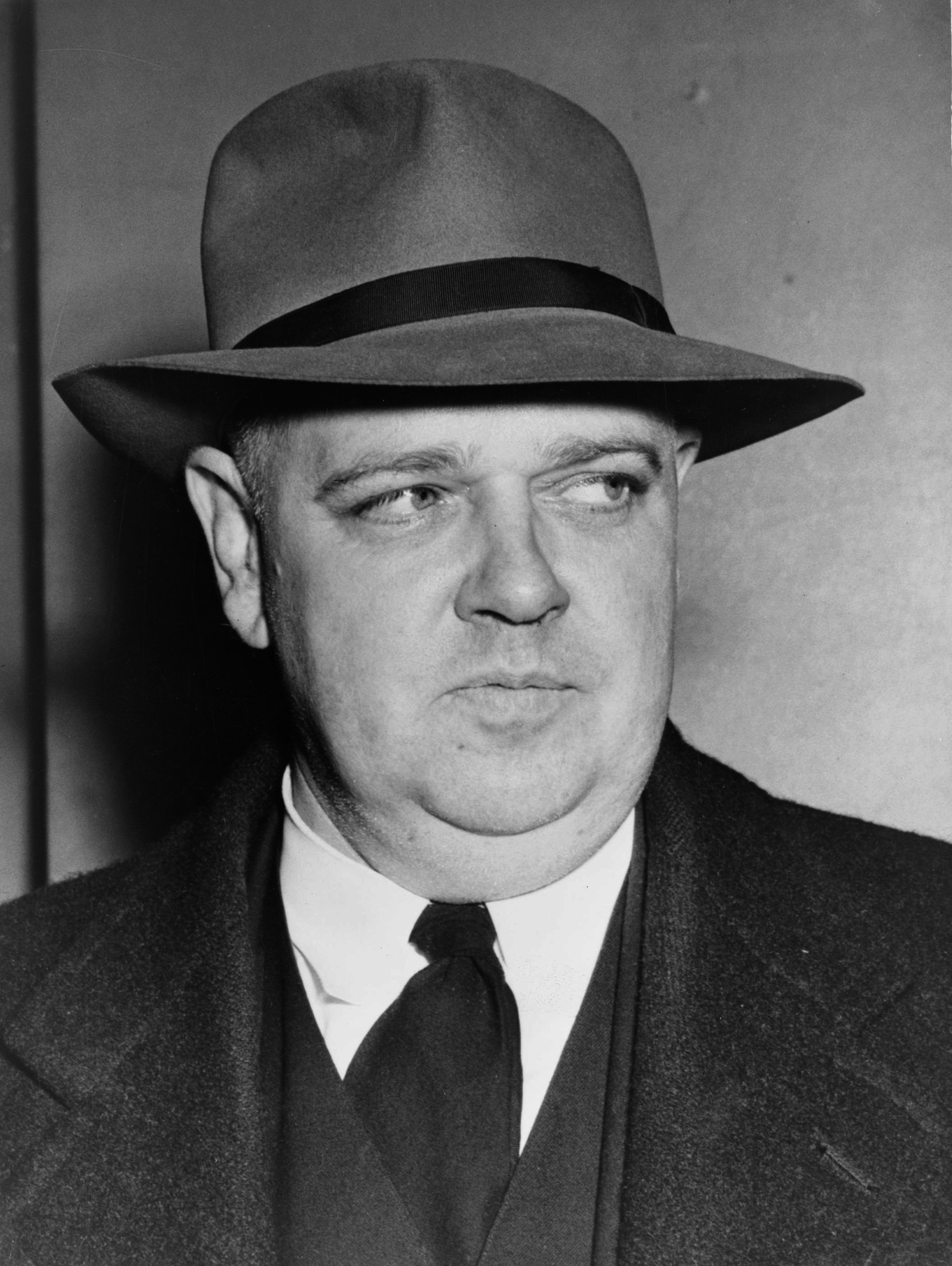
- Chambers in 1948
- Born: Jay Vivian Chambers; April 1, 1901; Philadelphia, Pennsylvania, U.S.
- Died: July 9, 1961 (aged 60); Westminster, Maryland, U.S.
- Education: Columbia University
- Occupations: Journalist, writer, spy, poet, translator
- Spouse: Esther Shemitz
- Children: Ellen Chambers, John Chambers
- Espionage activity
- Allegiance: Soviet Union; United States
- Service branch: "Communist underground" controlled by the GRU
- Service years: 1932–1938
- Codename: Carl (Karl), Bob, David Breen, Lloyd Cantwell, Carl Schroeder

Whittaker Chambers (born Jay Vivian Chambers; April 1, 1901 – July 9, 1961) was an American author, journalist, and spy. After dropping out of Columbia University, Chambers joined the open Communist Party in 1925. He wrote and edited for the New Masses and the Daily Worker, before being ordered to go underground as a secret agent for the Soviet intelligence services. From 1932 to 1938 he was part of the clandestine "Ware Group", based in Washington, D.C. Disillusioned by Joseph Stalin's rule and by communism more broadly, Chambers defected from the Soviet spy ring and eventually found employment at Time magazine, where he rose to become a senior editor.

Chambers testified before the House Committee on Un-American Activities in 1948. Among those whom he accused of membership in the Communist Party was a prominent Washington, D.C. lawyer and former government official, Alger Hiss. Hiss sued Chambers for slander and, in response, Chambers produced evidence of Hiss's activities as a Soviet spy while he had served in the US State Department in the run-up to World War II. Hiss could not be prosecuted for espionage because of the statute of limitations, but he was convicted of perjury in 1950 on the strength of the evidence provided by Chambers. The Hiss case contributed greatly to the Red Scare of the 1940s and 1950s and continued to attract attention and controversy for decades.

In 1952, Chambers published a memoir titled Witness, which covered his early life, his conversions first to Communism and then to Christianity, and his involvement in the Hiss case. That book went on to exert a major influence upon anti-communist and conservative political thought in the US during the second half of the 20th century. From 1957 to 1959, Chambers was a senior editor at National Review magazine. After years of suffering from poor health, Chambers died in 1961 on his farm in Westminster, Maryland. Ronald Reagan, a great admirer of Witness, posthumously awarded Chambers the Presidential Medal of Freedom in 1984.

== Background ==
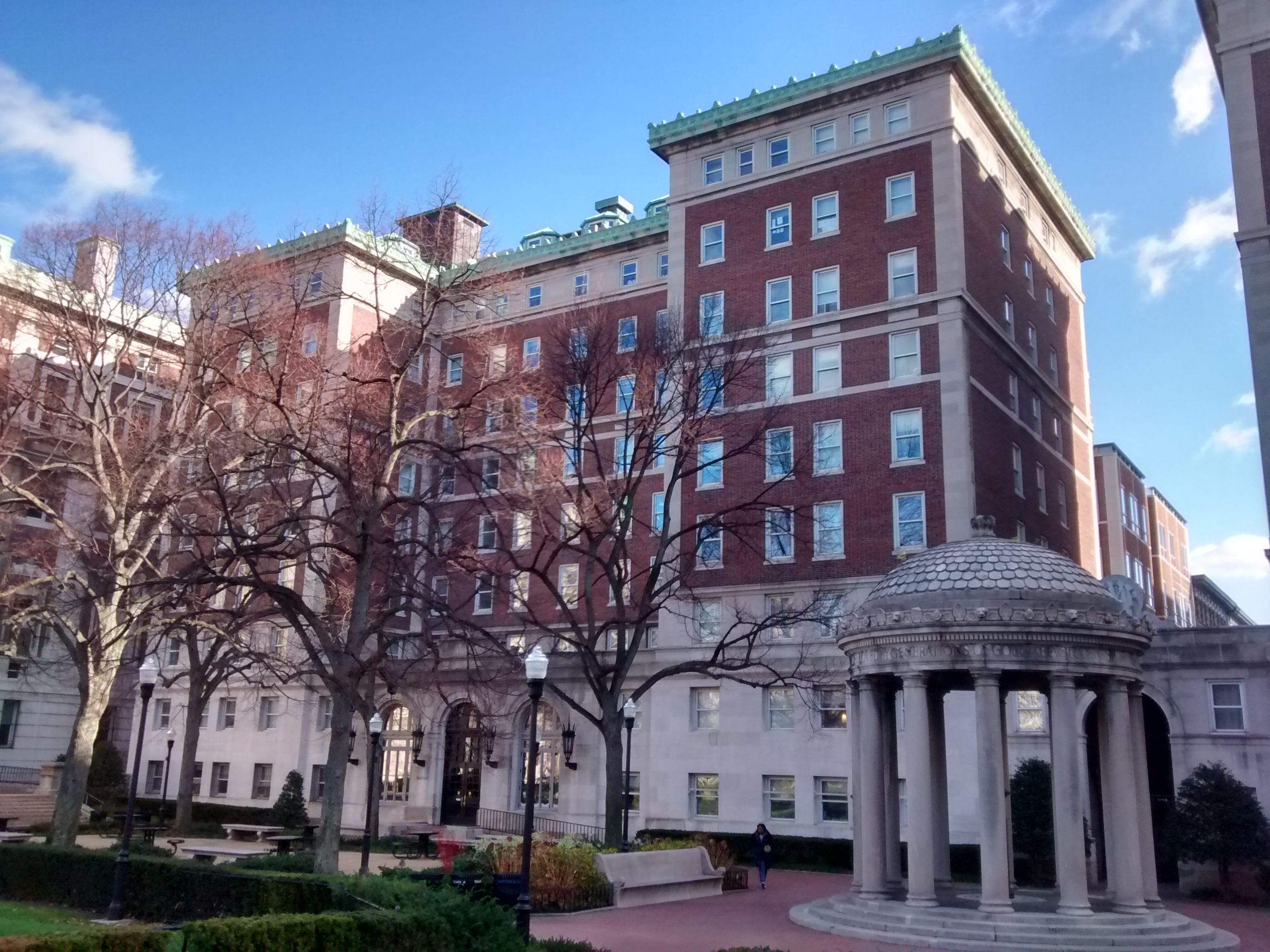
Hartley Hall at Columbia University, where Chambers boarded in the 1920s

Chambers was born in Philadelphia, Pennsylvania, and spent his infancy in Brooklyn. His family moved to Lynbrook, Long Island, New York State, in 1904, where he grew up and attended school. He was the elder of the two sons of Jay Chambers, an artist and member of the Decorative Designers, and Laha née Whittaker, a social worker. Early on, the young Chambers chose to go by "Whittaker", his mother's maiden name, instead of his given name "Jay Vivian". He would later describe his childhood as troubled by the distant relation between his parents, which led to a temporary separation, and by the presence in their household of his mentally ill grandmother. After withdrawing from college, Chambers's younger brother Richard descended into alcoholism and committed suicide at age 22. Chambers would later describe his brother's death as one of the circumstances that attracted him to communism, a doctrine that "offered me what nothing else in the dying world had power to offer at the same intensity, faith and a vision, something for which to live and something for which to die."

=== Education ===
After graduating from South Side High School in neighboring Rockville Centre in 1919, Chambers worked itinerantly in Washington and New Orleans, briefly attended Williams College, and then enrolled as a day student at Columbia College. At Columbia, his undergraduate peers included Meyer Schapiro, Frank S. Hogan, Herbert Solow, Louis Zukofsky, Arthur F. Burns, Clifton Fadiman, Elliott V. Bell, John Gassner, Lionel Trilling (who later fictionalized him as a main character in his novel The Middle of the Journey), Guy Endore, and City College student poet Henry Zolinsky. Chambers's early writing attracted attention and praise from his fellow students and from faculty members, including the poet and critic Mark Van Doren.

In his sophomore year, Chambers joined the Boar's Head Society and wrote a play called A Play for Puppets for Columbia's literary magazine The Morningside, which he edited. The work was deemed blasphemous by many students and administrators, and the controversy spread to New York City newspapers. Later, the play would be used against Chambers during his testimony against Hiss. Disheartened over the controversy, Chambers left Columbia in 1925. From Columbia, Chambers also knew Isaiah Oggins, who had gone into the Soviet underground a few years earlier; Chambers's wife, Esther Shemitz Chambers, knew Oggins's wife, Nerma Berman Oggins, from the Rand School of Social Science, the International Ladies' Garment Workers' Union, and The World Tomorrow.

=== Communism espionage ===
In 1924, Chambers read Vladimir Lenin's Soviets at Work and was deeply affected by it. He now saw the dysfunctional nature of his family, he would write, as "in miniature the whole crisis of the middle class", a malaise from which communism promised liberation. Chambers's biographer Sam Tanenhaus wrote that Lenin's authoritarianism was "precisely what attracts Chambers. ... He had at last found his church." Chambers became a Marxist and, in 1925, joined the Communist Party of the United States (CPUSA), then known as the Workers Party of America.

== Career ==
=== Communist ===
Chambers wrote and edited for the magazine New Masses and was an editor for the Daily Worker newspaper from 1927 to 1929.

Combining his literary talents with his devotion to communism, Chambers wrote four short stories for New Masses in 1931 about proletarian hardship and revolt, including Can You Make Out Their Voices?, which was considered by critics as one of the best pieces of fiction of American communism. Hallie Flanagan co-adapted and produced it as a play entitled Can You Hear Their Voices? (see Bibliography of Whittaker Chambers), staged across America and in many other countries. Chambers also worked as a translator, his works including the English version of Felix Salten's 1923 novel Bambi, a Life in the Woods.

=== Soviet underground ===
==== Ware group ====
Chambers was recruited to join the "communist underground" and began his career as a spy, working for a GRU (Main Intelligence Directorate) spy ring headed by Alexander Ulanovsky, also known as Ulrich. Later, his main handler was Josef Peters, who was replaced by CPUSA General Secretary Earl Browder with Rudy Baker. Chambers claimed that Peters introduced him to Harold Ware (although he later denied Peters had ever been introduced to Ware, and also testified to HCUA that he, Chambers, never knew Ware). Chambers claimed that Ware was head of a communist underground cell in Washington that reportedly included the following:

Name	Description
Lee Pressman	Assistant general counsel of Agricultural Adjustment Administration (AAA)
John Abt	Chief of Litigation for AAA (1933–1935), assistant general counsel of the WPA 1935, chief counsel on Senator Robert La Follette Jr.'s La Follette Committee (1936–1937) and special assistant to U.S. Attorney General (1937–1938)
Marion Bachrach	Sister of John Abt; office manager to Representative John Bernard of the Minnesota Farmer-Labor Party
Alger Hiss	Attorney for Agricultural Adjustment Administration and Nye Committee; moved to Department of State in 1936, where he became an increasingly prominent figure
Donald Hiss	Brother of Alger Hiss; employed at Department of State
Nathan Witt	Employed at Agricultural Adjustment Administration; later moved to National Labor Relations Board
Victor Perlo	Chief of Aviation Section of War Production Board; later, joined Office of Price Administration at Commerce and Division of Monetary Research at Treasury
Charles Kramer	Employed at Department of Labor's NLRB
George Silverman	Employed at RRB; later worked with Federal Coordinator of Transport, U.S. Tariff Commission and Labor Advisory Board of National Recovery Administration
Henry Collins	Employed at National Recovery Administration and later Agricultural Adjustment Administration
Nathaniel Weyl	Economist at Agricultural Adjustment Administration; later, defected from communism himself and gave evidence against party members
John Herrmann	Author; assistant to Harold Ware; employed at Agricultural Adjustment Administration; courier and document photographer for Ware group; introduced Chambers to Hiss

Apart from Marion Bachrach, these individuals were all members of Franklin Roosevelt's New Deal administration. Chambers worked in Washington as an organizer in communists in the city and as a courier between New York and Washington for stolen documents, which were delivered to Boris Bykov, the GRU station chief.

==== Other covert sources ====
Using the codename "Karl" or "Carl", Chambers served during the mid-1930s as a courier between various covert sources and Soviet intelligence. In addition to the Ware group mentioned above, other sources that Chambers alleged to have dealt with included the following:

Name	Description
Harry Dexter White	Director of Division of Monetary Research at the US. Department of the Treasury
Harold Glasser	Assistant Director, Division of Monetary Research, US. Department of the Treasury
Noel Field	Employed at Department of State
Julian Wadleigh	Economist with the U.S. Department of Agriculture; later, Trade Agreements section of the US. Department of State
Vincent Reno	Mathematician at U.S. Army Aberdeen Proving Ground
Ward Pigman	Employed at National Bureau of Standards, then Labor and Public Welfare Committee

=== Defection ===
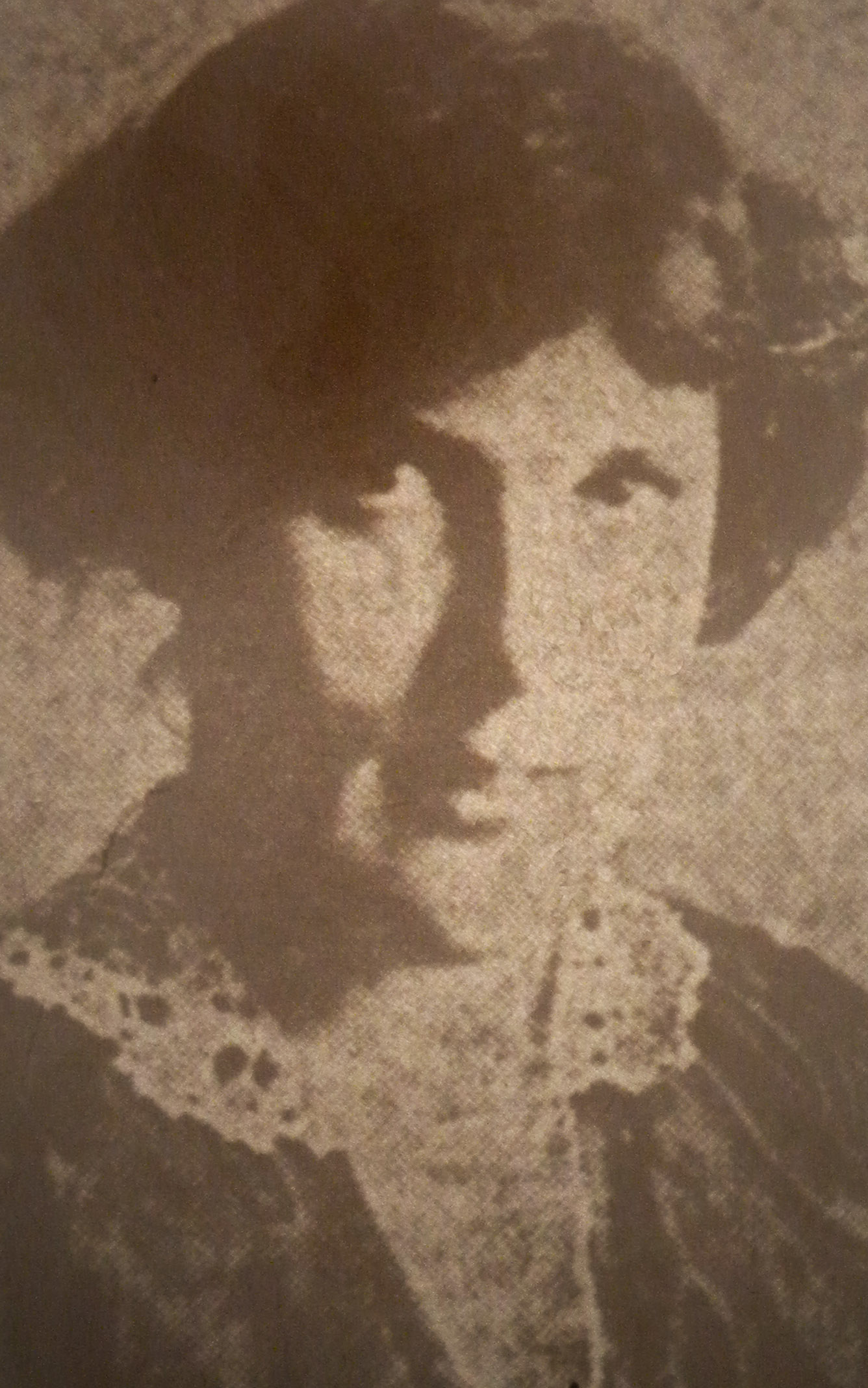
Juliet Stuart Poyntz (c. 1918), whose disappearance spurred Chambers to defect

Chambers carried on his espionage activities from 1932 until 1937 or 1938 even while his faith in communism was waning. He became increasingly disturbed by Joseph Stalin's Great Purge, which began in 1936. He was also fearful for his own life since he had noted the murder in Switzerland of Ignace Reiss, a high-ranking Soviet spy who had broken with Stalin, and the disappearance of Chambers's friend and fellow spy Juliet Stuart Poyntz in the United States. Poyntz had vanished in 1937, shortly after she had visited Moscow and returned disillusioned with the communist cause because of the Stalinist Purges.

Chambers ignored several orders that he travel to Moscow since he worried that he might be "purged". He also started concealing some of the documents he collected from his sources. He planned to use them, along with several rolls of microfilm photographs of documents, as a "life preserver" to prevent the Soviets from killing him and his family.

In 1938, Chambers broke with communism and took his family into hiding. He stored the "life preserver" at the home of his wife's sister, whose son Nathan Levine was Chambers's lawyer. Initially, he had no plans to give information on his espionage activities to the U.S. government. His espionage contacts were his friends, and he had no desire to inform on them.

In his examination of Chambers's conversion from the left to the right, author Daniel Oppenheimer noted that Chambers substituted his passion for communism with a passion for God and saw the world in black-and-white terms both before and after his defection. In his autobiography, Chambers presented his devotion to communism as a reason for living, but after his defection, he saw his actions as being part of an "absolute evil".

=== Berle meeting ===
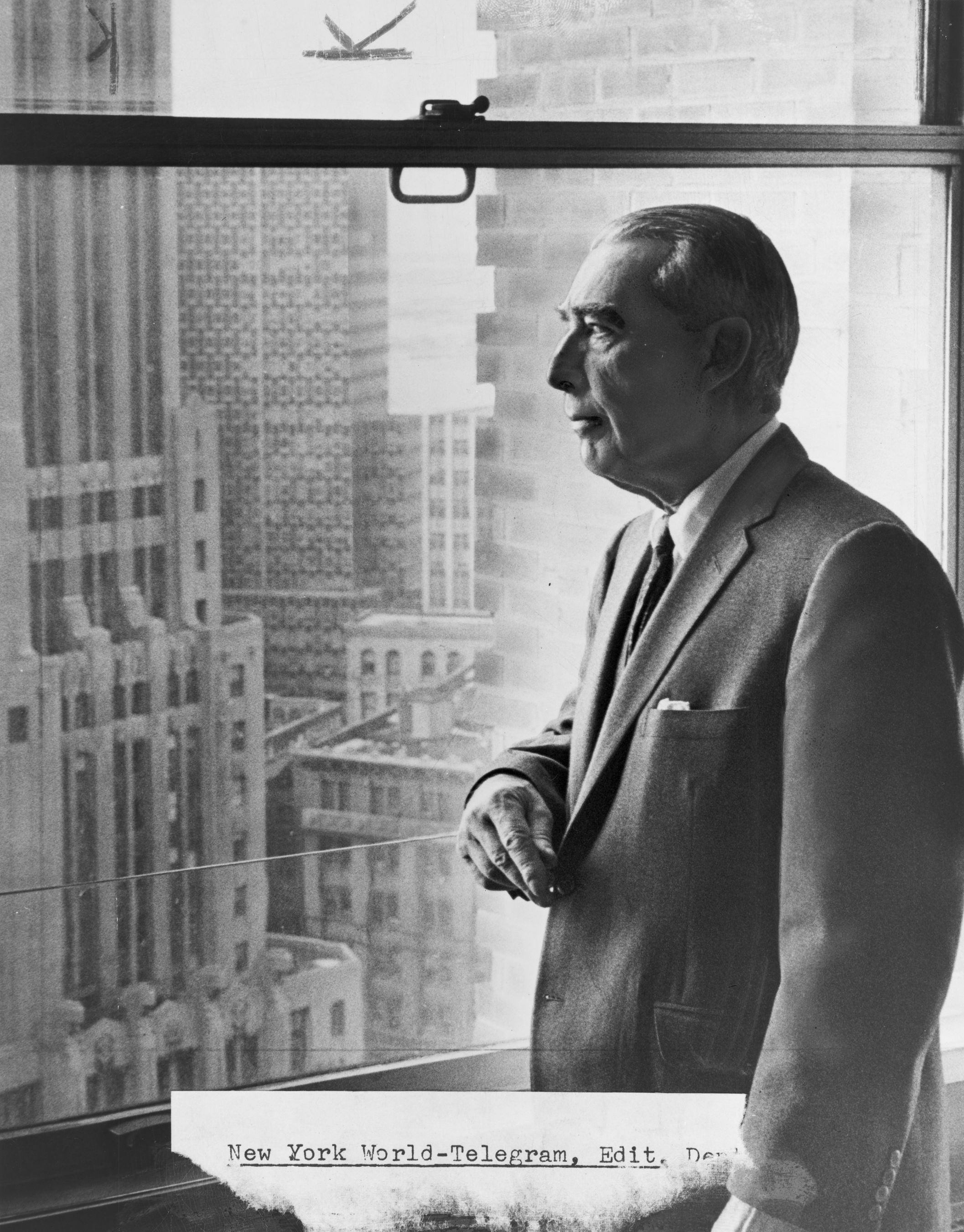
Adolf A. Berle (c. 1965): Member of the FDR administration who took Chambers's 1939 report. Initially enthusiastic, he later downplayed the report.

The August 1939 Molotov–Ribbentrop Pact drove Chambers to take action against the Soviet Union. In September 1939, at the urging of the anticommunist Russian-born journalist Isaac Don Levine, Chambers and Levine met with Assistant Secretary of State Adolf A. Berle. Levine had introduced Chambers to Walter Krivitsky, who was already informing American and British authorities about Soviet agents who held posts in both governments. Krivitsky told Chambers that it was their duty to inform. Chambers agreed to reveal what he knew on the condition of immunity from prosecution.

During the meeting at Berle's home, Woodley Mansion, in Washington, Chambers named several current and former government employees as spies or communist sympathizers. Many names mentioned held relatively minor posts or were already under suspicion. Some names were more significant and surprising: Alger Hiss, his brother Donald Hiss, and Laurence Duggan, who were all respected, mid-level officials in the State Department, and Lauchlin Currie, a special assistant to Franklin Roosevelt. Another person named Vincent Reno had worked on a top-secret bombsight project at the Aberdeen Proving Grounds.

Berle found Chambers's information tentative, unclear, and uncorroborated. He took the information to the White House, but President Franklin Roosevelt dismissed it. Berle made little if any objection, but he kept his notes, which were later used as evidence during Hiss's perjury trials.

Berle notified the Federal Bureau of Investigation of Chambers's information in March 1940. In February 1941, Krivitsky was found dead in his hotel room. Police ruled the death a suicide, but it was widely speculated that Krivitsky had been killed by Soviet intelligence. Worried that the Soviets might try to kill Chambers too, Berle again told the FBI about his interview with Chambers. The FBI interviewed Chambers in May 1942 and June 1945 but took no immediate action in line with the political orientation of the United States, which viewed the potential threat from the Soviet Union as minor compared to that of Nazi Germany. Only in November 1945, when Elizabeth Bentley defected and corroborated much of Chambers's story, would the FBI begin to take Chambers seriously.

=== Time ===
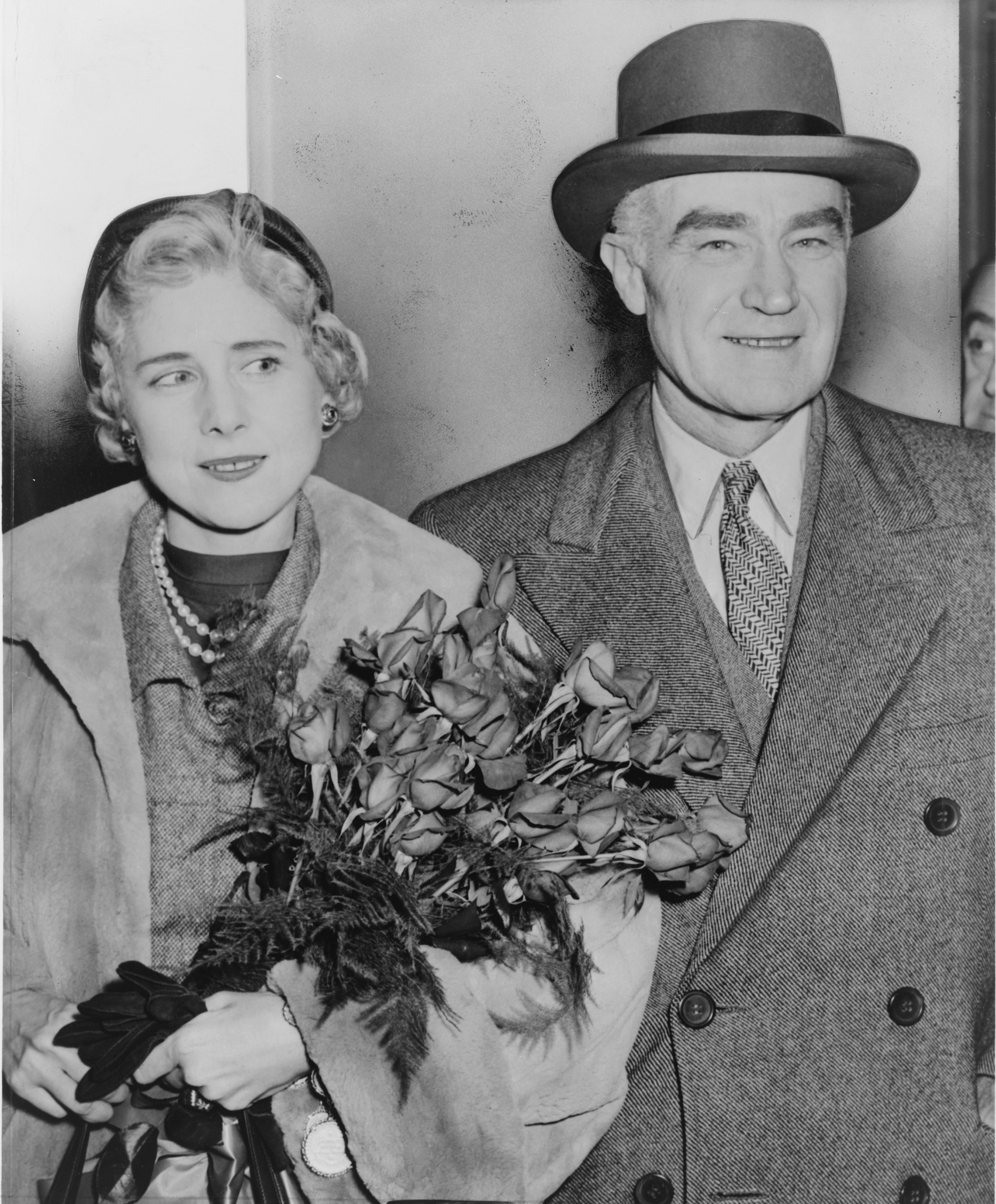
Henry Luce and Clare Boothe Luce (c. 1954) valued Chambers's writing at Time magazine

During the Berle meeting, Chambers had come out of hiding after a year and joined the staff of Time (April 1939). He landed a cover story within a month on James Joyce's latest book, Finnegans Wake. He started at the back of the magazine, reviewing books and film with James Agee and then Calvin Fixx. When Fixx suffered a heart attack in October 1942, Wilder Hobson succeeded him as Chambers's assistant editor in Arts & Entertainment. Other writers working for Chambers in that section included novelist Nigel Dennis, future New York Times Book Review editor Harvey Breit, and poets Howard Moss and Weldon Kees.

A struggle had arisen between those, like Theodore H. White and Richard Lauterbach, who raised criticism of what they saw as the elitism, corruption and ineptitude of Chiang Kai-shek's regime in China and advocated greater co-operation with Mao's Red Army in the struggle against Japanese imperialism, and Chambers and others like Willi Schlamm who adhered to a perspective that was staunchly pro-Chiang, anticommunist, and both later joined the founding editorial board of William F. Buckley, Jr.'s National Review. Time founder Henry Luce, who grew up in China and was a personal friend of Chiang and his wife, Soong Mei-ling, came down squarely on the side of Chambers to the point that White complained that his stories were being censored and even suppressed in their entirety, and he left Time shortly after the war as a result.

In 1940, William Saroyan lists Fixx among "contributing editors" at Time in Saroyan's play, Love's Old Sweet Song. Luce promoted him senior editor in either summer 1942 (Weinstein) or September 1943 (Tanenhaus) and became a member of Time's "Senior Group", which determined editorial policy, in December 1943.

Chambers, close colleagues, and many staff members in the 1930s helped elevate Time and have been called "interstitial intellectuals" by the historian Robert Vanderlan. His colleague John Hersey described them as follows:

Time was in an interesting phase; an editor named Tom Matthews had gathered a brilliant group of writers, including James Agee, Robert Fitzgerald, Whittaker Chambers, Robert Cantwell, Louis Kronenberger, and Calvin Fixx. ... They were dazzling. Time's style was still very hokey—"backward ran sentences till reeled the mind"—but I could tell, even as a neophyte, who had written each of the pieces in the magazine, because each of these writers had such a distinctive voice.

By early 1948, Chambers had become one of the best known writer-editors at Time. First had come his scathing commentary "The Ghosts on the Roof" (March 5, 1945) on the Yalta Conference in which Hiss partook. Subsequent cover-story essays profiled Marian Anderson, Arnold J. Toynbee, Rebecca West and Reinhold Niebuhr. The cover story on Marian Anderson ("Religion: In Egypt Land", December 30, 1946) proved so popular that the magazine broke its rule of non-attribution in response to readers' letters:

Most Time cover stories are written and edited by the regular staffs of the section in which they appear. Certain cover stories, that present special difficulties or call for a special literary skill, are written by Senior Editor Whittaker Chambers.

In a 1945 letter to Time colleague Charles Wertenbaker, Time-Life deputy editorial director John Shaw Billings said of Chambers, "Whit puts on the best show in words of any writer we've ever had ... a superb technician, particularly skilled in the mosaic art of putting a Time section together." Chambers was at the height of his career when the Hiss case broke later that year.

=== Hiss case ===
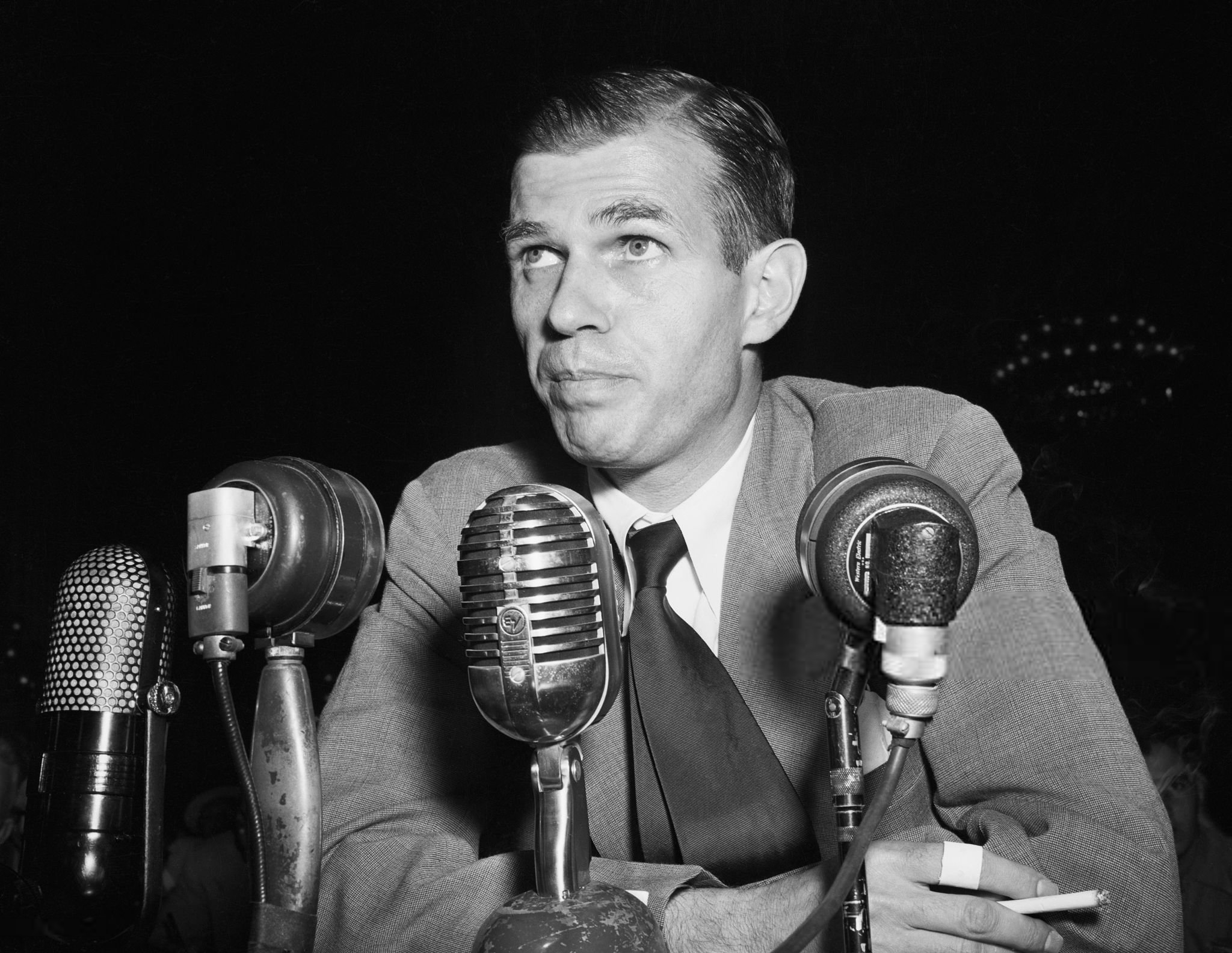
Alger Hiss (1948) denied Chambers's allegations but was convicted of perjury

On August 3, 1948, Chambers was called to testify before the House Committee on Un-American Activities (HCUA), where he gave the names of individuals he said were part of the underground "Ware group" in the late 1930s, including Alger Hiss. He once again named Hiss as a member of the Communist Party but did not yet make any accusations of espionage. In subsequent sessions, Hiss testified and initially denied that he knew anyone by the name of Chambers, but on seeing him in person and after it became clear that Chambers knew details about Hiss's life, Hiss said that he had known Chambers under the name "George Crosley".

Hiss denied that he had ever been a communist. Since Chambers still presented no evidence, the committee had initially been inclined to take the word of Hiss on the matter. However, a committee member, Richard Nixon, received secret information from the FBI that had led him to pursue the issue. When it issued its report, HCUA described Hiss's testimony as "vague and evasive".

Biographer Timothy Naftali describes the trial as "a battle between two queers", an allusion to the fact that both parties were supposedly homosexual. Additionally, Hiss's stepson, Timothy Hobson, alleged that Chambers's accusation was borne out of unrequited romantic feelings for Hiss.

==== "Red Herring" ====
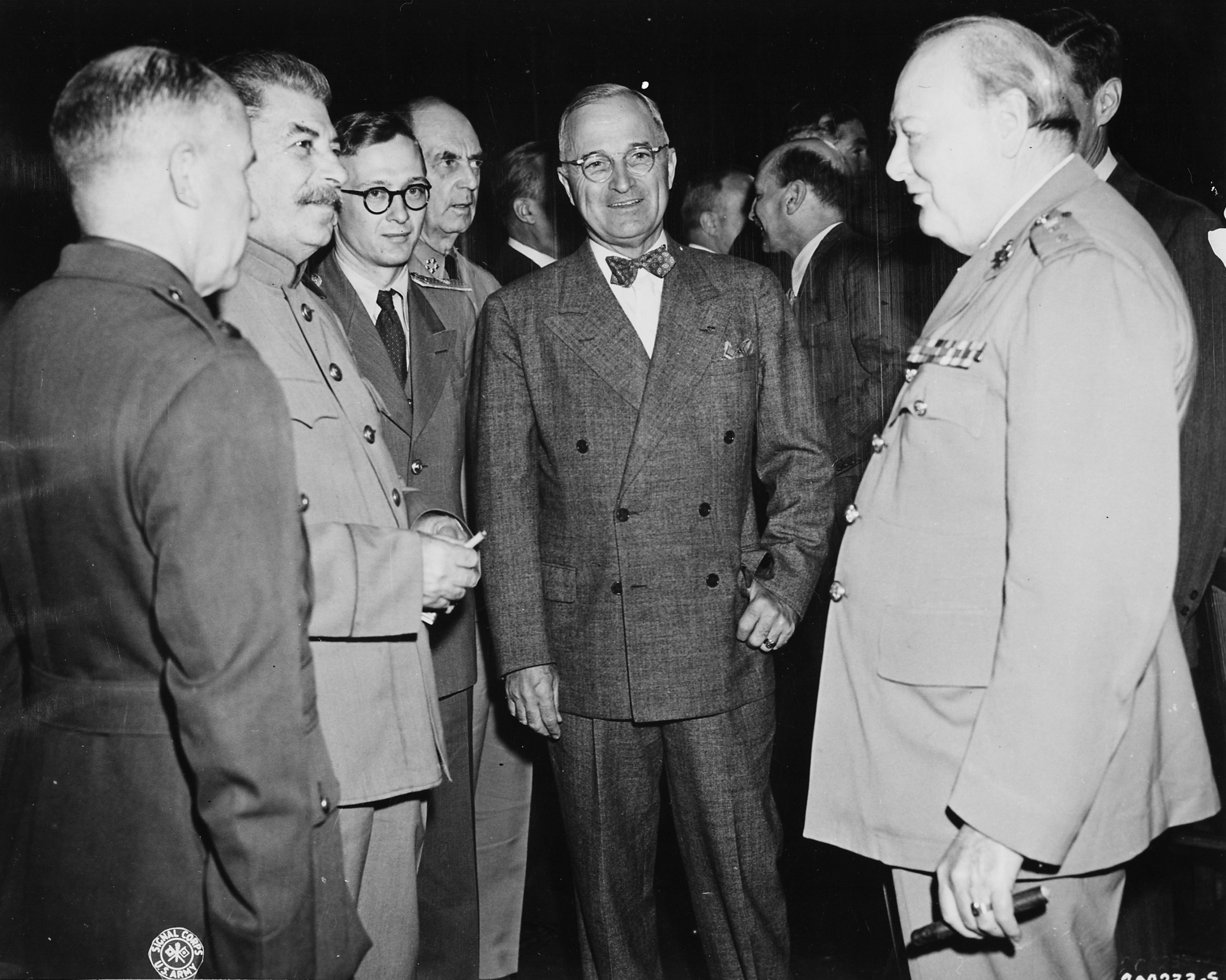
Harry S. Truman (center) with Joseph Stalin (left) and Winston Churchill (right) in 1945. Truman called Chambers's allegations a "red herring".

The country quickly became divided over Hiss and Chambers. President Harry S. Truman, initially responded dismissively, labeling the case a "red herring". In the atmosphere of increasing anticommunism, the Alger Hiss case contributed to paranoia among Republicans and movement conservatives, who would increasingly speculate as to much more widespread Communist infiltration (later culminating in McCarthyism). Truman also issued Executive Order 9835, which initiated a program of loyalty reviews for federal employees in 1947.

==== "Pumpkin Papers" ====
Hiss filed a $75,000 libel suit against Chambers on October 8, 1948. Under pressure from Hiss's lawyers, Chambers finally retrieved his envelope of evidence and presented it to the HCUA after it had subpoenaed them. It contained four notes in Hiss's handwriting, 65 typewritten copies of State Department documents and five strips of microfilm, some of which contained photographs of State Department documents. The press came to call these the "Pumpkin Papers" since Chambers had briefly hidden the microfilm in a hollowed-out pumpkin. The documents indicated that Hiss knew Chambers long after mid-1936, when Hiss said he had last seen "Crosley", and also that Hiss had engaged in espionage with Chambers. Chambers explained his delay in producing the evidence as an effort to spare an old friend from more trouble than necessary. Until October 1948, Chambers had repeatedly stated that Hiss had not engaged in espionage, even when Chambers testified under oath. Chambers was forced to testify at the Hiss trials that he had committed perjury several times, which reduced his credibility in the eyes of his critics.

The five rolls of 35 mm film known as the "pumpkin papers" were thought until late 1974 to be locked in HCUA files. The independent researcher Stephen W. Salant, an economist at the University of Michigan, sued the U.S. Justice Department in 1975 when his request for access to them under the Freedom of Information Act was denied. On July 31, 1975, as a result of this lawsuit and follow-on suits filed by Peter Irons and by Alger Hiss and William Reuben, the Justice Department released copies of the "pumpkin papers" that had been used to implicate Hiss. One roll of film turned out to be totally blank because of overexposure, two others are faintly-legible copies of nonclassified Navy Department documents relating to such subjects as life rafts and fire extinguishers, and the remaining two are photographs of the State Department documents introduced by the prosecution at the two Hiss trials, relating to US-German relations in the late 1930s.

That story, however, as reported by The New York Times in the 1970s, contains only a partial truth. The blank roll had been mentioned by Chambers in his autobiography, Witness. However, in addition to innocuous farm reports, the documents on the other pumpkin patch microfilms also included "confidential memos sent from overseas embassies to diplomatic staff in Washington, D.C." Worse, those memos had originally been transmitted in code, which, thanks to their presumable possession of both coded originals and the translations (claimed by Chambers, to be forwarded by Hiss), the Soviets now could easily understand.

In taped recordings of President Nixon on July 1, 1971, he admitted that he had not checked the Pumpkin Papers prior to their use and he felt that the Justice Department was out to exonerate Hiss and a federal grand jury would indict Nixon's ally Chambers for perjury. The FBI continued investigating Hiss's innocence into 1953.

==== Perjury ====
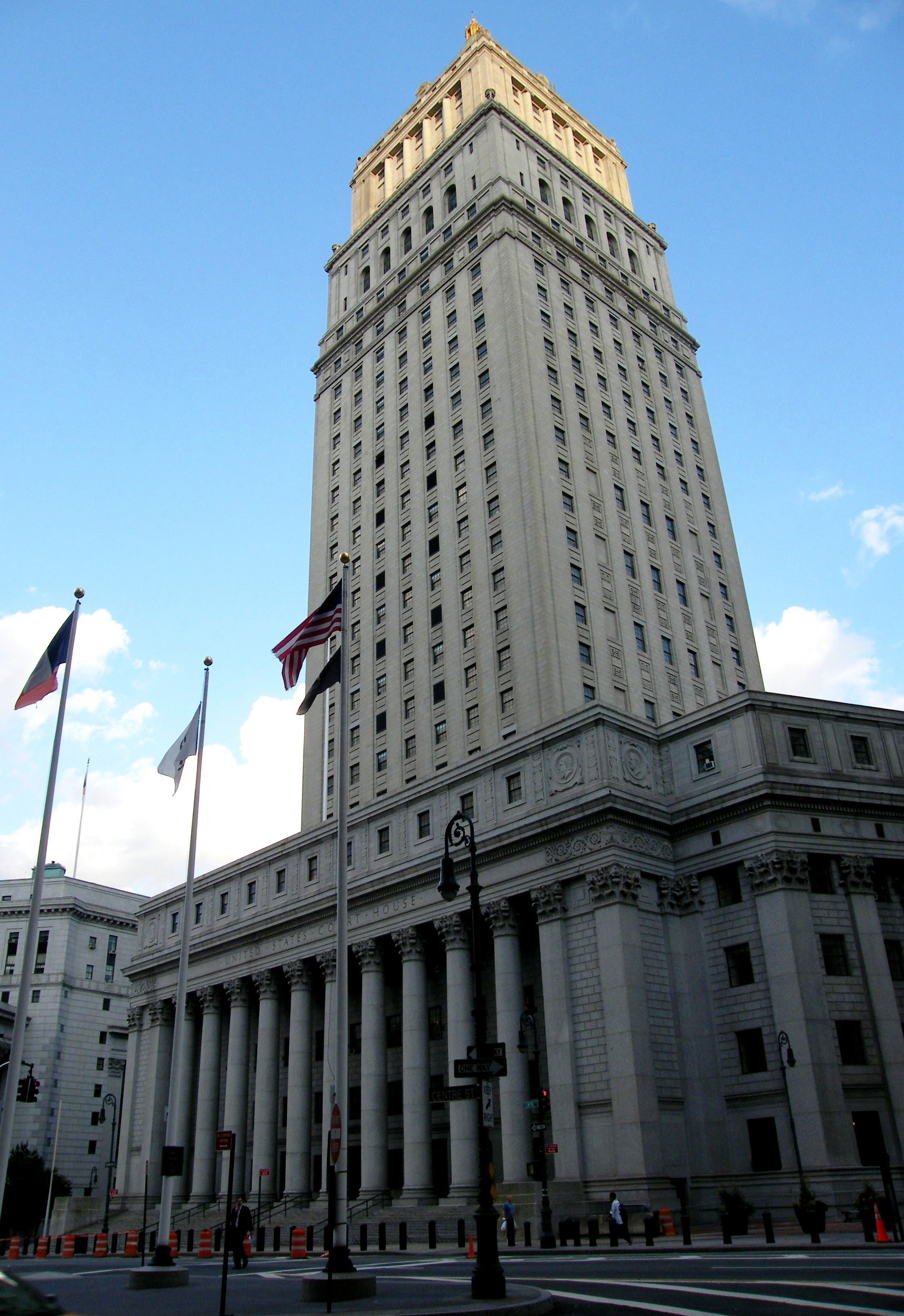
The trials against Hiss took place at the Foley Square Courthouse (now Thurgood Marshall Courthouse) in New York City (here, 2009)

Hiss was indicted for two counts of perjury relating to testimony he had given before a federal grand jury the previous December. He had denied giving any documents to Chambers and testified that he had not seen Chambers after mid-1936.

Hiss was tried twice for perjury. The first trial, in June 1949, ended with the jury deadlocked 8–4 for conviction. In addition to Chambers's testimony, a government expert testified that other papers typed on a typewriter belonging to the Hiss family matched the secret papers produced by Chambers. An impressive array of character witnesses appeared on behalf of Hiss: two Supreme Court justices, Felix Frankfurter and Stanley Reed, the former Democratic presidential nominee John W. Davis, and the future Democratic presidential nominee Adlai Stevenson. Chambers, on the other hand, was attacked by Hiss's attorneys as "an enemy of the Republic, a blasphemer of Christ, a disbeliever in God, with no respect for matrimony or motherhood". In the second trial, Hiss's defense produced a psychiatrist who characterized Chambers as a "psychopathic personality" and "a pathological liar".

The second trial ended in January 1950 with Hiss being found guilty on both counts of perjury. He was sentenced to five years in prison.

Chambers had resigned from Time in December 1948. After the Hiss case, he wrote a few articles for Fortune, Life, and Look magazines.

In 1951, during the HCUA hearings, William Spiegel of Baltimore identified a photo of "Carl Schroeder" as Chambers while Spiegel was describing his involvement with David Zimmerman, a spy in Chambers's network.

==== Witness ====
In 1952, Chambers's book Witness was published to widespread acclaim. It was a combination of autobiography and a warning about the dangers of communism. Arthur M. Schlesinger Jr. called it "a powerful book". Ronald Reagan credited the book as the inspiration behind his conversion from a New Deal Democrat to a conservative Republican. Witness was a bestseller for more than a year and helped to pay off Chambers's legal debts, but bills lingered ("as Odysseus was beset by a ghost").

According to the commentator George Will in 2017:

Witness became a canonical text of conservatism. Unfortunately, it injected conservatism with a sour, whiney, complaining, crybaby populism. It is the screechy and dominant tone of the loutish faux conservatism that today is erasing [William F.] Buckley's legacy of infectious cheerfulness and unapologetic embrace of high culture. Chambers wallowed in cloying sentimentality and curdled resentment about "the plain men and women"—"my people, humble people, strong in common sense, in common goodness"—enduring the "musk of snobbism" emanating from the "socially formidable circles" of the "nicest people" produced by "certain collegiate eyries".

=== National Review ===
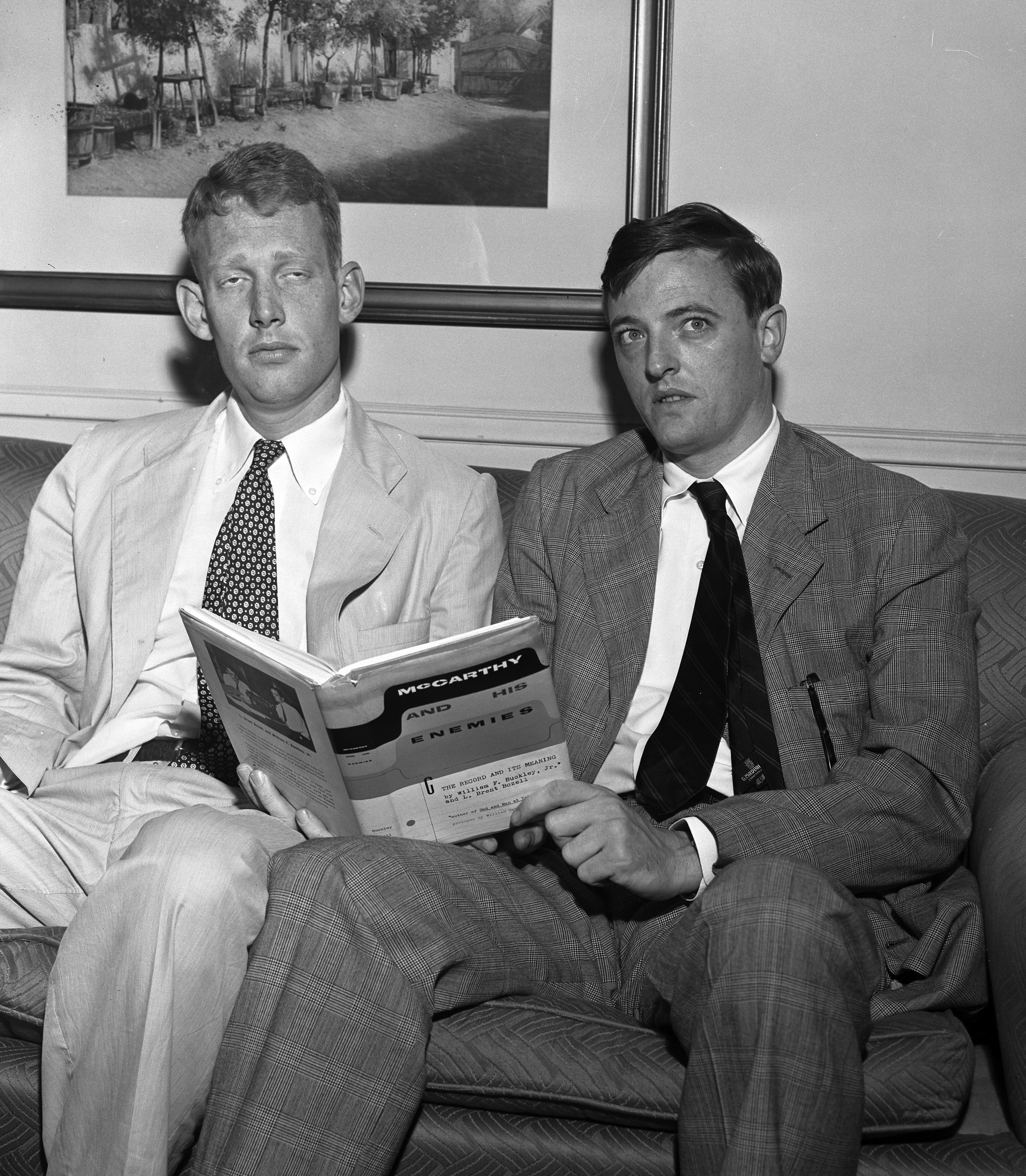
right: William F. Buckley Jr., left: L. Brent Bozell Jr. Buckley in 1954 first asked Chambers to endorse their book on Joseph McCarthy.

In 1955, William F. Buckley Jr. started the magazine National Review, and Chambers worked there as senior editor, publishing articles there for a little over a year and a half (October 1957 – June 1959). The most widely cited article to date is a scathing review, "Big Sister is Watching You", of Ayn Rand's Atlas Shrugged.

In 1959, Chambers resigned from National Review, although he continued correspondence with Buckley despite having suffered a series of heart attacks. In one letter, he noted, "I am a man of the Right because I mean to uphold capitalism in its American version. But I claim that capitalism is not, and by its essential nature cannot conceivably be, conservative."

In that same year, Chambers and his wife embarked on a visit to Europe, the highlight of which was a meeting with Arthur Koestler and Margarete Buber-Neumann at Koestler's home in Austria. That fall, he recommenced studies at Western Maryland College (now McDaniel College) in Westminster, Maryland.

== Personal life and death ==
In 1930 or 1931, Chambers married the artist Esther Shemitz (1900–1986). Shemitz, who had studied at the Art Students League and integrated herself into New York City's intellectual circles, met Chambers at the 1926 textile strike at Passaic, New Jersey. They then underwent a courtship that faced resistance from her mentor comrade Grace Hutchins. In the 1920s, she worked for The World Tomorrow, a pacifist magazine.

The couple had two children, Ellen and John, during the 1930s. While some Communist leadership expected professional revolutionists to go childless, the couple refused, a choice Chambers cited as part of his gradual disillusionment with communism. His daughter Ellen died in 2017.

In 1978, Allen Weinstein's Perjury revealed that the FBI has a copy of a letter in which Chambers described homosexual liaisons during the 1930s. The letter copy states that Chambers gave up the practices in 1938 when he left the underground, which he attributed to his newfound Christianity. The letter has remained controversial from many perspectives.

Chambers's conversion to Christianity was expressed by his baptism and confirmation in the Episcopal Church, but more permanently in his and his family's request for membership in the Pipe Creek Friends Meetinghouse of the Religious Society of Friends (Quakers) near their farm in Maryland on August 17, 1943. They remained a part of this meeting until long after his death. In 1952, Chambers wrote a memoir, Witness, that was serialized in The Saturday Evening Post. Historian H. Larry Ingle argues that Witness is a "twentieth-century addition to the classic Quaker journals", and that "it is impossible to understand him without taking his religious convictions into consideration".

Chambers died of a heart attack on July 9, 1961, at his 300-acre (1.2 km^{2}) farm in Westminster, Maryland. He had had angina since the age of 38 and had had several heart attacks previously.

== Awards ==
- 1952 – Honorary Doctorate of Law from Mount Mary College (Milwaukee)
- 1953 – National Book Award finalist for nonfiction (Witness)
- 1984 – Presidential Medal of Freedom (posthumously) (for contribution to "the century's epic struggle between freedom and totalitarianism")

== Legacy ==
In 2011, author Elena Maria Vidal interviewed David Chambers about his grandfather's legacy. Versions of the interview were published in the National Observer and The American Conservative.

=== Presidential Medal of Freedom (1984) ===
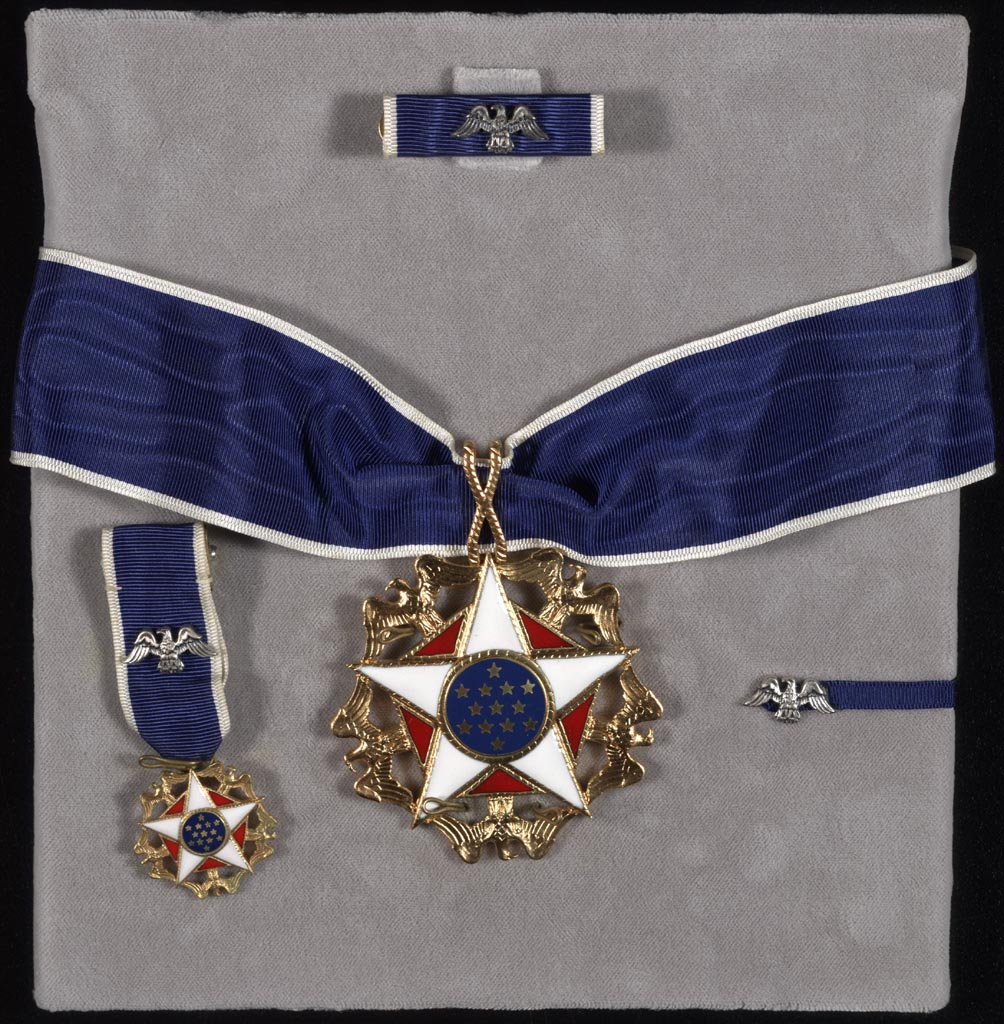
Chambers received the Presidential Medal of Freedom posthumously from President Ronald Reagan in 1984

In 1984, President Ronald Reagan posthumously awarded Chambers the Presidential Medal of Freedom, for his contribution to "the century's epic struggle between freedom and totalitarianism". In 1988, Interior Secretary Donald P. Hodel granted national landmark status to the Pipe Creek Farm. In 2001, members of the George W. Bush administration held a private ceremony to commemorate the hundredth anniversary of Chambers's birth. Speakers included William F. Buckley, Jr.

=== Shortlived "Whittaker Chambers Award" (2017–2019) ===
In January 2017, the National Review Institute (NRI) inaugurated a "Whittaker Chambers Award" for its 2017 Ideas Summit.

Recipients:

- Daniel Hannan: On March 16, 2017, the first recipient was Daniel Hannan MEP, dubbed "the man who brought you Brexit" by The Guardian.
- Mark Janus: In February 2019, NRI announced its second biennial winner of the award, Mark Janus. Supporters say Janus champions free speech; detractors say he seeks to erode public unions by enabling free rides.

In March 2019, The Wall Street Journal reported strong opposition from the family of Whittaker Chambers. It quoted from a family statement: "All of us agree: the efforts of the two awardees run counter to the instincts and experience of Whittaker Chambers. All of us agree: their efforts have not matched his." Chambers's son said that the two awardees "are way, way off the target of the man whose name goes along with the award". One grandchild said, "I almost thought, well, 'Gosh, did the National Review guys read his book?'" Regarding the award to Daniel Hannan, another grandchild said, "My grandfather would have been horrified" by a Brexiteer who sought to divide the West (the European Union), as if it were a favor to the "very Stalin-like" Vladimir Putin. Regarding the anti-union Mark Janus, the family noted that Chambers's wife, Esther Shemitz, had been a member of the International Ladies' Garment Workers' Union and that other family members were active in unions, including Chambers himself in the Newspaper Guild.

In response, National Review conceded, "We don't own the Chambers name". While it refused the family's request to withdraw the two awards, it did agree to discontinue it. It also agreed to publish the Chambers family's statement on its website the weekend after the award. After National Review did not publish on time as promised, the family published themselves ("Withdraw Whittaker"). Christopher Buckley, author and son of William F. Buckley Jr., supported the Chambers family with a similar story about the William F. Buckley Jr. Award for Media Excellence: when Media Research Center awarded Sean Hannity, Buckley objected, the center rescinded the award, and stopped making the award altogether.

=== Proposed Whittaker Chambers monument (2020) ===
In September 2020, two senators from Carroll County to the Maryland General Assembly, Justin Ready and Michael Hough, announced their intention, reported in the Carroll County Times to recommend a "Whittaker Chambers Memorial" for a "National Garden of American Heroes, following an executive order by Donald Trump to create an Interagency Task Force for Building and Rebuilding Monuments to American Heroes to establish that garden. Two members of the Whittaker Chambers family also wrote the Carroll County Times to oppose the senators' intention:

Whittaker Chambers sought a simple life of farming the Pipe Creek Farm. He was a Quaker. His beliefs ran toward austerity and self-effacement. Quaker meeting houses stand unadorned, without monuments or statues. He would not have liked such fanfare.
The best way to remember our grandfather is to read his books. They are his memoir Witness (1952) and his later writings in Cold Friday (1964). Rather than a monument, he left testimony to read.
As President Ronald Reagan said, when posthumously presenting the Medal of Freedom to him in 1984, "The witness is gone; the testimony will stand."

== Works ==
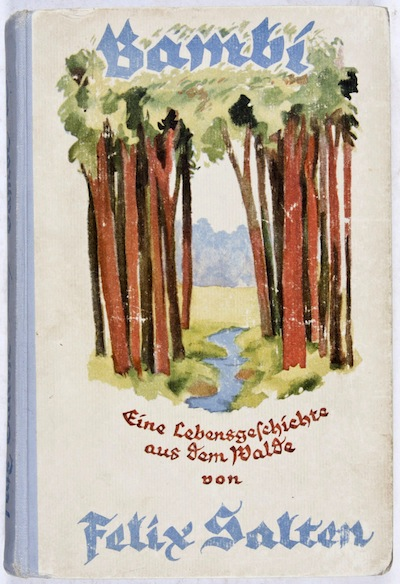
Chambers translated Bambi, a Life in the Woods from its original German (Bambi: Eine Lebensgeschichte aus dem Walde)

In 1928, Chambers translated Bambi, a Life in the Woods, by Felix Salten, into English.

Chambers's book Witness is on the reading lists of The Heritage Foundation, The Leadership Institute, and the Russell Kirk Center for Cultural Renewal. He is regularly cited by conservative writers such as Heritage's president Edwin Feulner and George H. Nash.

Cold Friday, Chambers's second memoir, was published posthumously in 1964 with the help of Duncan Norton-Taylor, & widow, Esther Shemitz Chambers. The book predicted that the fall of communism would start in the satellite states surrounding the Soviet Union in Eastern Europe. A collection of his correspondence with William F. Buckley, Jr., Odyssey of a Friend, was published in 1968; a collection of his journalism—including several of his Time and National Review writings, was published in 1989 as Ghosts on the Roof: Selected Journalism of Whittaker Chambers.

== See also ==
- History of Soviet espionage in the United States
- List of Presidential Medal of Freedom recipients
- List of American spies
- Jacob Burck
- Chambers (surname)
- Reuben Shemitz

== Sources ==
- Tanenhaus, Sam (1998). Whittaker Chambers: A Biography. Modern Library. ISBN 0-375-75145-9.
- Weinstein, Allen (1997) [1978]. Perjury: The Hiss–Chambers Case. Knopf. ISBN 0-394-49546-2.
