= Esther Shemitz =

American painter, wife of Whittaker Chambers (1900–1986)

- Born: June 25, 1900; New York City, US
- Died: August 16, 1986 (aged 86); Westminster, Maryland, US
- Education: Rand School, Leonardo da Vinci Art School
- Alma mater: Art Students League
- Occupations: Artist (painter), illustrator
- Years active: 1925–1980
- Known for: Testified during Hiss Case
- Spouse: Whittaker Chambers
- Children: 2
- Relatives: Reuben Shemitz (brother), Nathan Levine (nephew), Sylvan Shemitz (nephew)
- Website: whittakerchambers.org

Esther Shemitz (June 25, 1900 – August 16, 1986), also known as "Esther Chambers" and "Mrs. Whittaker Chambers," was a pacifist American painter and illustrator who, as wife of ex-Soviet spy Whittaker Chambers, provided testimony that "helped substantiate" her husband's allegations during the Hiss Case.

== Background ==
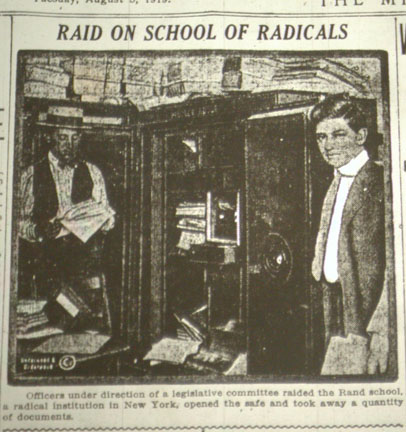
Lusk Committee raids Rand School summer 1919, while Shemitz was a student there

Shemitz was born on June 25, 1900, in New York City. She was the youngest child of Rabbi Benjamin Shemitz and Rose Thorner. The family soon moved from New York City to New Haven, Connecticut, where they ran a candy store. The family had immigrated to the U.S. in the 1890s from the "Podolsk Province."

In the late 1910s, Shemitz attended the Rand School. At Rand in the same period were Nerma Berman, the wife of the Soviet spy Cy Oggins, and CPUSA Fosterite Carrie Katz, the first wife of philosopher Sidney Hook. In May 1920, Algernon Lee, educational director, presided over the graduation of the second-largest class ever at Rand, whose members included: John J. Bardsley, William D. Bavelaar, Annie S. Buller, Louis Cohan, Harry A. Durlauf, Clara Friedman, Rebecca Goldberg, William Greenspoon, Isabella E. Hall, Ammon A. Hennsey (Ammon Hennacy), Hedwig Holmes, Annie Kronhardt, Anna P. Lee, Victoria Levinson, Elsie Lindenberg, Selma Melms (first wife of Ammon Hennacy).), Hyman Neback, Bertha Ruvinsky, Celia Samorodin, Mae Schiff, Esther T. Shemitz, Nathan S. Spivak, Esther Silverman, Sophia Ruderman, and Clara Walters.

== Career ==
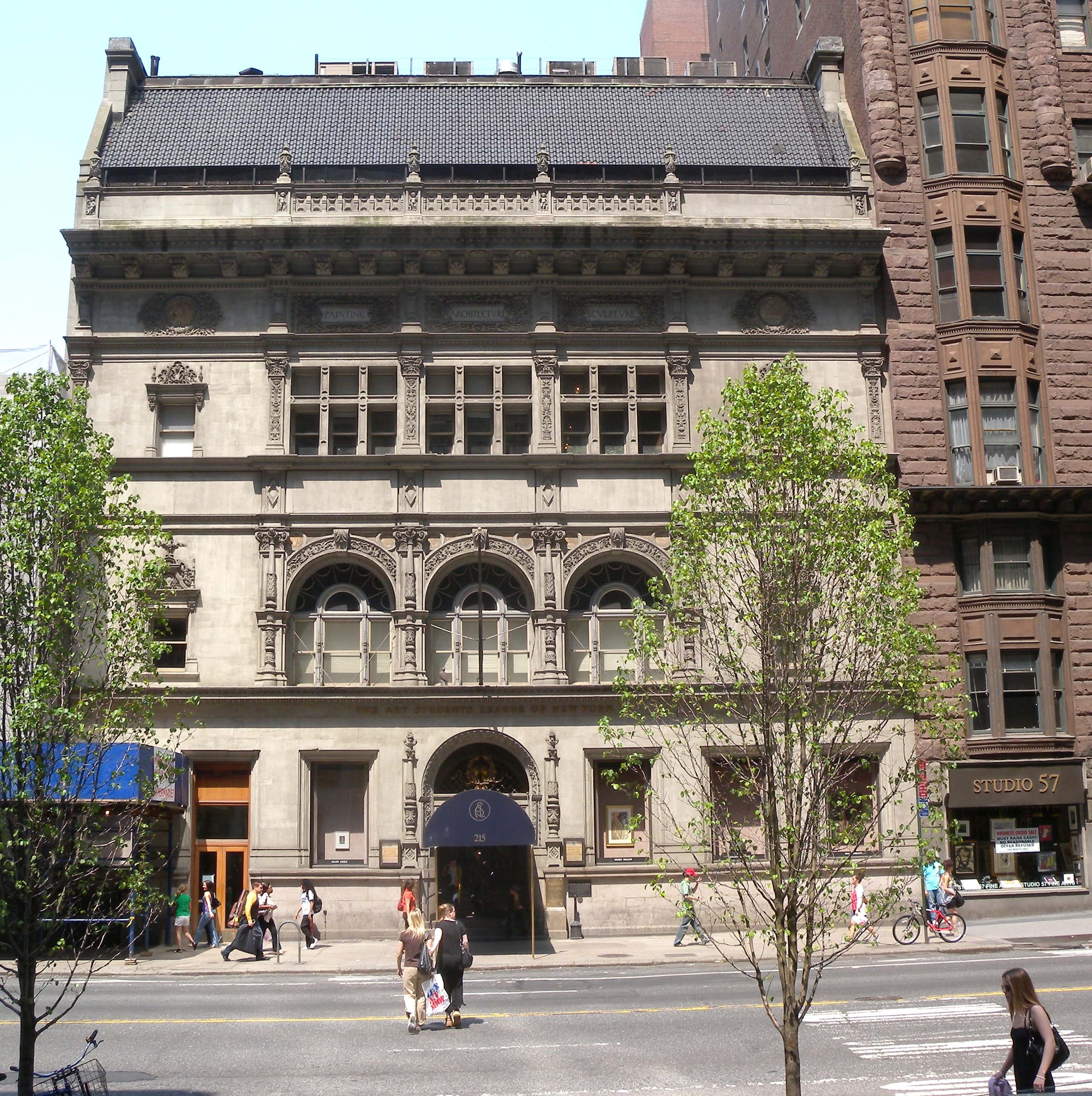
Art Students League (2009), where Shemitz studied in the mid-1920s

Shemitz was a pacifist long before she met Chambers, though some sources call her a communist fellow traveler or "communist sympathizer" (e.g., Alistair Cooke), while many (e.g., Christopher Hitchens) are ambiguous on the subject.

=== Painter, illustrator ===
During the early 1920s, Shemitz worked at a chapter of the International Ladies' Garment Workers' Union (ILGWU) under Juliet Stuart Poyntz in return for a stipend to the Leonardo da Vinci Art School. On the night of April 5, 1922, "Esther T. Schemitz," described as "secretary-treasurer" of the ILGWU's Mount Vernon chapter, was arrested for disorderly conduct when she allegedly called a special police officer a "professional strike breaker." Shemitz was granted bail within two hours of jailing.

In 1926, Shemitz roomed on East 11 Street on the Lower East Side with writer Grace Lumpkin, and they both worked at The World Tomorrow magazine. During her time at the magazine, contributors included "social reformers, suffrage leaders, black intellectuals, labor activists, and a range of other progressives. Shemitz also served as the advertising manager at the New Masses in 1926. In December 1926, on behalf of the World Tomorrow, Shemitz took Rebecca West to see the Passaic Textile Strike at the Botany Worsted Mills. There Shemtiz was beaten and arrested along with Sophie Shulman of New Masses magazine and another reporter, Sender Garlin.

In the latter 1920s, Shemitz studied at the Art Students League in New York under Boardman Robinson, Jan Matulka and Thomas Hart Benton. Shemitz also contributed cartoons to the Daily Worker newspaper.

In 1929, Shemitz was one of many signatories to form the John Reed Club in New York. She illustrated books for International Publishers, notably Labor and Silk by Grace Hutchins (1929), with a cover designed by Louis Lozowick.

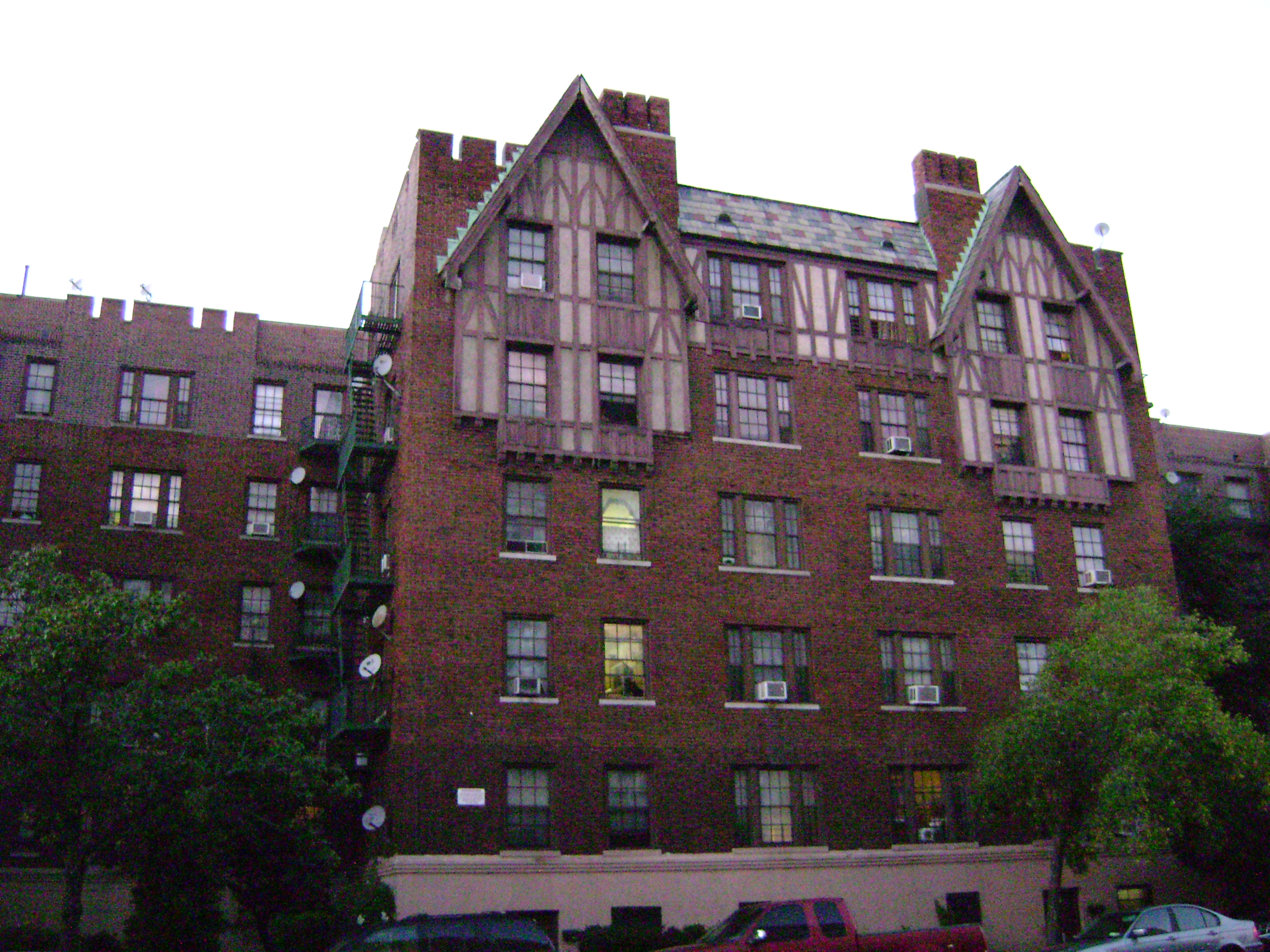
United Workers Cooperatives, where Shemitz and fellow John Reed Club artists exhibited in 1929

At year-end 1929, Shemitz partook in the first-ever art exhibition of the John Reed Club, held at the United Workers Cooperatives apartment buildings (also called the "United Workers Cooperative Colony" and the "Commie Coops") on Bronx Park East. Artists in the show included: Jacob Burck, Fred Ellis, William Gropper, Eitaro Ishigaki, Gan Kolski, Louis Lozowick, Jan Matulka, Morris Pass, Anton Refregier, Louis Leon Ribak, Otto Soglow, and Art Young.

In 1930, Shemitz worked briefly for the Soviet-controlled Amtorg Trading Corporation, AMTORG, a job found for her by Hutchin's partner Anna Rochester.

In May 1930, Shemitz joined scores of artists, writers, and educators, all members of the John Reed Club, (at 102 West Fourteenth Street, New York) in signing a protest against "Red-baiting" protest. They included: Sherwood Anderson, Franz Boas, Walt Carmon, Malcolm Cowley, Floyd Dell, Carl Van Doren, John Dos Passos, Max Eastman, Fred Ellis, Kenneth Fearing, Waldo Frank, Harry Freeman, Hugo Gellert, Mike Gold, William Gropper, Jack Hardy, Josephine Herbst, Eitaro Ishigaki, Alfred Kreymborg, Joshua Kunitz, Louis Lozowick, A.B. Magil, H. L. Mencken, Scott Nearing, Joseph North, Isidor Schneider, Edwin Seaver, Edith Segal, Upton Sinclair, John Sloan, Raphael Soyer, Genevieve Taggard, Carlo Tresca, Louis Untermeyer, Edmund Wilson, and Art Young. At least one co-signer was a classmate (Jacob Burck), another a roommate (Grace Lumpkin), two were sponsors (Grace Hutchins and Anna Rochester), and two were teachers (Jan Matulka and Boardman Robinson).

In April 1931, Shemitz married Whittaker Chambers. In May 1931, she contributed a cartoon to the New Masses magazine. In 1932, when her husband's name appeared as an editor, the names of Esther Shemitz and Jacob Burck appeared as (art) contributors for the New Masses alongside longer-term contributors like Louis Lozowick, Hugo Gellert, William Gropper, William Siegel, and Joseph Vogel.

=== Soviet underground ===
Shemitz cut short her own art career when her husband entered the Soviet underground in mid-1932. Thus, unlike most of her circle, who contributed to publications such as the Daily Worker newspaper and New Masses magazine, she did not become one of the New Deal's Federal Art Project artists during the latter part of the Great Depression and into World War II.

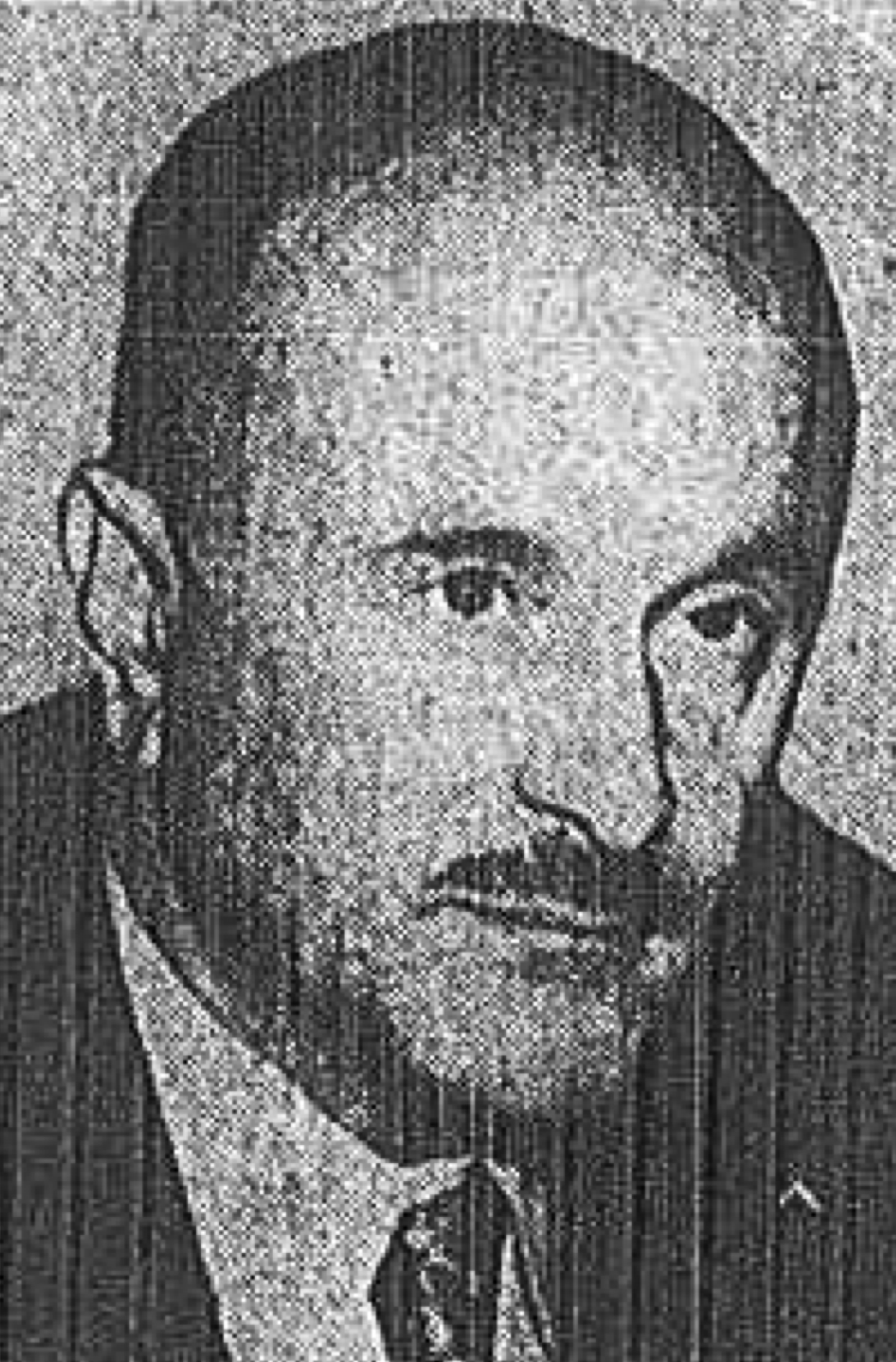
Reuben Shemitz (Dec 1948), Shemitz's older brother

In 1938, when Chambers defected from the underground, Grace Hutchins delivered a death threat against him, through her brother, attorney Reuben Shemitz. Later, following a grand jury investigation in December 1948, Reuben Shemitz told the press:

(Hutchins) said she wanted to see him on a 'matter of life and death' ... She assured me that no harm would come to my sister or her children if Whit would get in touch with someone known to Whit as Steve (J. Peters).

In his 1952 memoir, Chambers detailed:

There strode into my brother-in-law's office one morning a rather striking-looking white-haired woman, about fifty years old. She told the receptionist that Miss Grace Hutchins wished to see Mr. Shemitz ...
In his private office, she came to the point at once: "If you will agree to turn Chambers over to us," she said, "the party will guarantee the safety of your sister and the children." My startled brother-in-law, who, like most Americans, was completely unaware of what Communism is really like (we had never discussed the subject), tried to explain that he did not know even the whereabouts of his sister, her husband or their children ...
"If he does not show up by (such and such a day)," she said briskly, "he will be killed." with that she left ... Terrified by the visit and unable to warn us, he was frantic. He rushed to the only two people he could think of who might know where we were ... Neither of them could help him.

. She managed the family's Pipe Creek Farm from the late 1930s to the mid-1950s.

=== Hiss Case ===
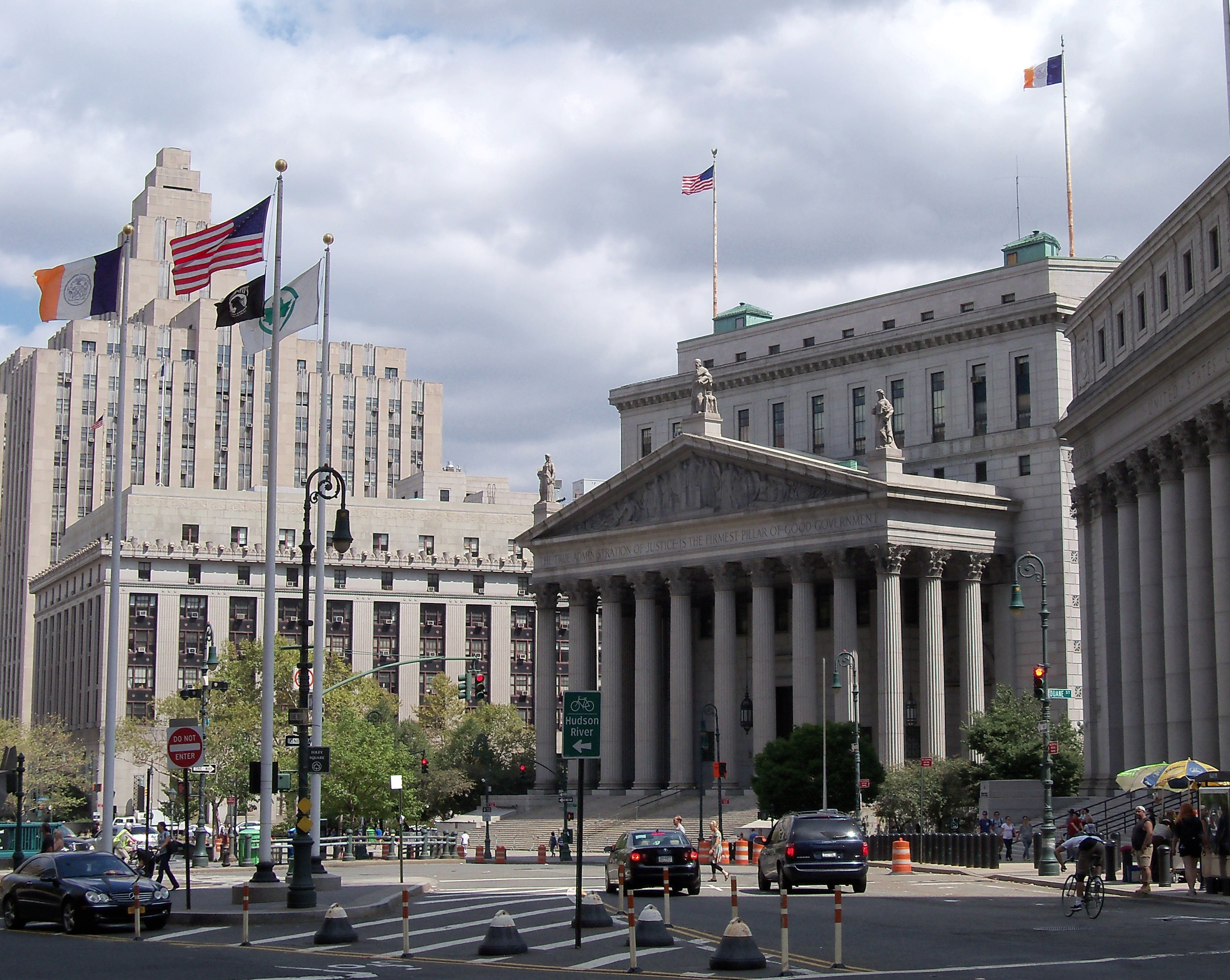
Foley Square in 2014 in New York City, site of grand jury and trials in the Hiss Case.

During deposition for the slander suit of Alger Hiss against Chambers in 1948, the Hiss legal team's rough treatment of Shemitz was the final factor in leading Chambers to disclose the existence of his "life preserver," which contained the "Baltimore Documents" and the "Pumpkin Papers." During the Hiss Case and trials, Shemitz corroborated and often augmented much of her husband's testimony. (She further explained, "I am now trying to remember things I had shut out of my mind, I thought completely.")

In December 1948, with indictments in the Hiss Case pending, Shemitz struck an elderly female pedestrian with her car; the woman soon died. The accident made front pages:

Brooklyn Eagle

Sunday, December 19, 1948

HELD IN AUTO DEATH

Mrs. Whittaker Chambers, wife of the self-confessed former Communist spy, leaves the Baltimore police station after her arraignment in connection with the death of an aged woman struck by her car as she was going to the railroad station to pick up her husband after he testified before the Federal grand jury in Manhattan. Mrs. Chambers is the former Esther Shemitz of Brooklyn.

Soon after, the case was dropped, as the victim had repeatedly attempted suicide by jumping in front of oncoming cars.

=== Aftermath ===
Shemitz was subject to rumors from Hiss supporters, particularly one claiming that not only were she and Lumpkin lesbian lovers but they were also involved in a four-way menage with their allegedly gay husbands – most recently put forward in biography of lesbians Anna Rochester and Grace Hutchins. In fact, Hutchins was the source of many such rumors: another she spread to the Hiss defense team was that Shemitz had told Hutchins that Chambers had spent time in the Westchester Division of the Bloomingdale Insane Asylum, a claim she later withdrew. (Robert Cantwell, a close friend of Chambers, had received treatment there in the 1940s; "Robert Cantwell" was an alias Chambers had used in the Soviet underground.) A.B. Magil (a long-time Daily Worker writer and editor and CPUSA member) told Elinor Ferry (a Hiss supporter) that Chambers' wife and her roommate Grace Lumpkin appeared to be lesbians. "Esther was masculine in appearance and in her voice. Grace was the softer, more feminine type." The overall experience of the Hiss Case led Shemitz to avoid all press and never speak to researchers, including Allen Weinstein.

== Personal life and death ==
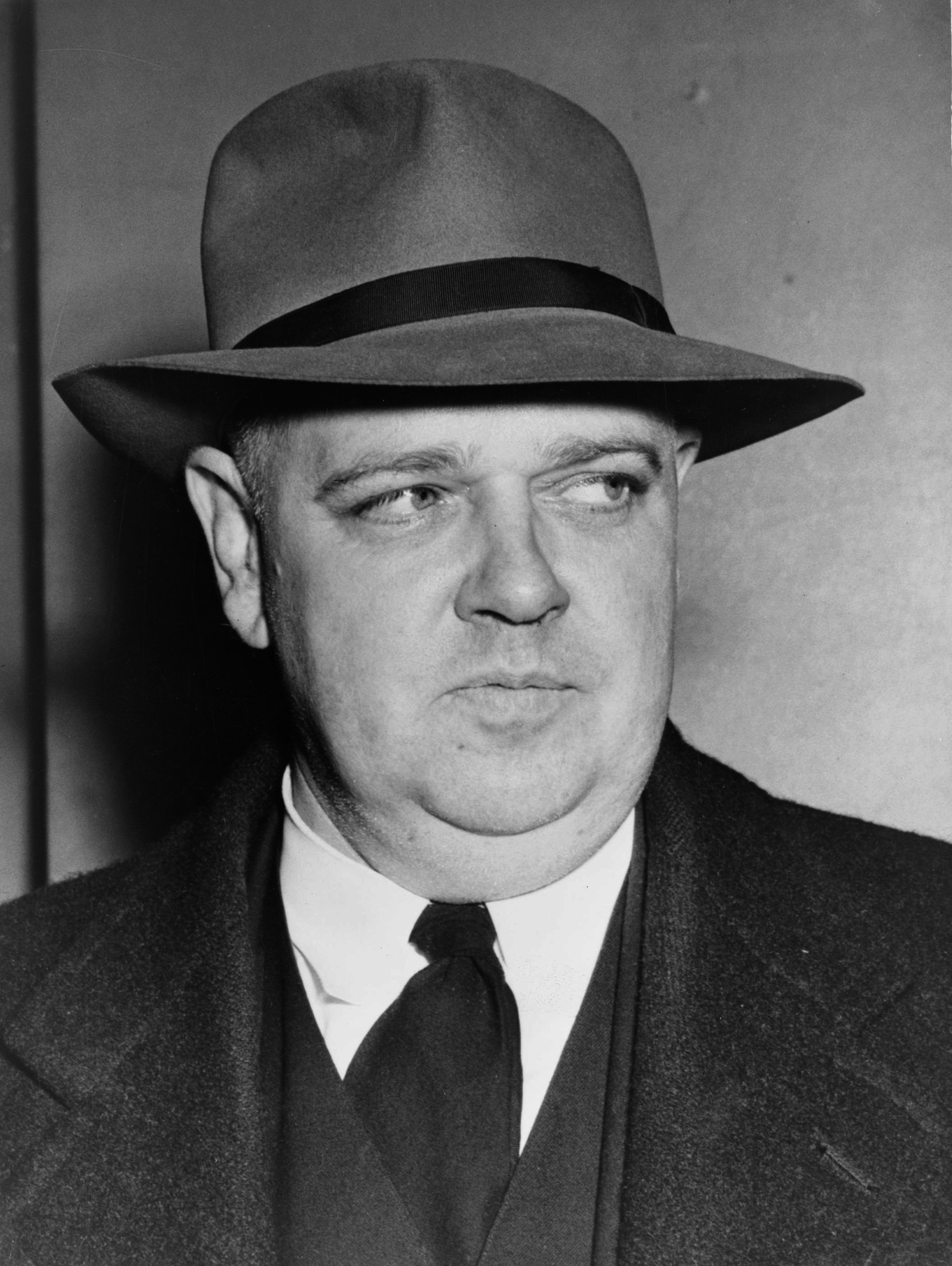
Whittaker Chambers (c. 1948), Shemitz's husband

Shemitz's older brother was attorney Reuben Shemitz. A nephew was Nathan Levine; another was Sylvan Shemitz.

In 1926, Whittaker Chambers first saw Shemitz at the Passaic Textile Strike, which he described at length in his 1952 memoir.

In 1930, Chambers and friend Mike Intrator began to court Shemitz and Lumpkin; both couples married in 1931. Shemitz's marriage was witnessed by Grace Hutchins and her life partner Anna Rochester. Shemitz and Chambers had a daughter in 1933 and a son in 1936.

Once Chambers defected, husband and wife lived at the Pipe Creek Farm, near Westminster, Maryland, for the rest of their lives. The couple had two children, Ellen and John, during the 1930s, despite the Communist leadership expecting couples to remain childless, but many refused, a choice Chambers cited as part of his gradual disillusionment with communism. Daughter Ellen died in 2017; her children are Stephen, Pamela, and John.

Shemitz made her first and only trip abroad, to Europe, with Chambers in the summer of 1959, during which they met Arthur Koestler and Margarete Buber-Neumann among others.

When Chambers died of his seventh heart attack on July 9, 1961, Shemitz collapsed and was rushed to the nearest hospital in Gettysburg, Pennsylvania. On August 16, 1986, she died age 86 at her home.

== Works ==
=== Paintings, illustrations ===
All of Shemitz's paintings are held privately by her family or friends. Her illustrations appeared in the Daily Worker newspaper, the New Masses magazine, and the book Labor and Silk and include:

- "Alookin' f'r a home," New Masses (May 1931)

=== Books, articles ===
- "Creative Impulse in a Hostile Environment" with Grace Lumpkin, The World Tomorrow (April 1926)
- Labor and Silk by Grace Hutchins, illustrations by Esther Shemitz, cover by Louis Lozowick (New York: International Publishers, 1929)
- Cold Friday by Whittaker Chambers, edited by Duncan Norton-Taylor and Esther Shemitz (New York: Random House, 1964)

== External sources ==
- "Widow of Chambers Dies". The New York Times. August 20, 1986.
- "Esther Shemitz Chambers; Widow of Man Who Played Key Role in Alger Hiss Case". Los Angeles Times. August 23, 1986.
- Chambers, Whittaker (1952). Witness. New York: Random House. pp. 48–50 (death threat), 232 (Passaic), 265 (courtship). ISBN 9780895269157. LCCN 52005149.
- "Clara Database of Women Artists: Esther Shemitz Chambers". National Museum of Women in the Arts. August 23, 1986. Archived from the original on November 19, 2018.
- HathiTrust: Labor and Silk
