= Barry B. Levine =

American sociologist (1941–2020)

Professor Emeritus Barry B. Levine
- Born: January 22, 1941; Brooklyn, New York, U.S.
- Died: August 10, 2020 (aged 79); Miami, Florida, U.S.
- Occupation: Professor of Sociology
- Spouse: Rosario Aycardi
- Children: two sons
- Parent(s): Nathan Levine, Miriam Margolies

Academic background
- Education: University of Pennsylvania
- Alma mater: New School for Social Research
- Website: https://gss.fiu.edu/people/faculty-emeriti/barry-levine/

Barry B. Levine (January 22, 1941 – August 10, 2020) was an American academic and founding professor of Sociology at the Florida International University.

== Background ==
Barry B. Levine was born on January 22, 1941, in Brooklyn, New York. His parents were labor lawyer Nathan Levine and Miriam Margolies; he had a younger brother David (who also became an academic). He attended Brooklyn Tech. He received his B.A. in 1961 from the University of Pennsylvania and his M.A. in 1965 and Ph.D. in 1973 from the New School for Social Research.

== Career ==
Levine held a teaching position at the University of Puerto Rico for seven years before leaving for FIU, of which he was a founding professor in 1972 through his retirement in 2007, after which he was professor emeritus of sociology.

In 1969, he co-founded and edited Caribbean Review, an English-language journal focused on the culture and ideals of the Caribbean, Latin America and their emigrant groups; subscribers included the White House under Presidents Ronald Reagan and George Herbert Walker Bush. In 1981, Caribbean Review was a finalist for the National Magazine Award.

== Personal life and death ==
Levine married Rosario Aycardi; they had two sons.

Barry B. Levine died aged 79 on August 10, 2020, in Miami.

== Works ==
Levine is perhaps best known for penning Benjy Lopez which received much acclaim; most recently in a February, 2008, Newsweek article written by art historian Robert Farris Thompson.

In 2014, he was writing on the topic of "The Impermanence of Industry: Lessons Learned from the Last Great American Garment Maker," a first-person testimonial about a 77-year-old garment manufacturer who has had factories throughout the US, the Caribbean, Asia, and Latin America.

His works include:

Books:

- El Desafío Neoliberal: El Fin del Tercermundismo en América Latina, 1992
- The Caribbean Exodus, 1987
- The New Cuban Presence in the Caribbean, 1983
- Benjy Lopez, A Picaresque Tale of Emigration and Return, 1980
- Problemas de Desigualdad Social en Puerto Rico, 1972

Articles:

- 1999: “A Socioeconomic Approach to Market Transactions,” The Journal of Socio-Economics, with Milan Zafirovski
- 1997: “Economic Sociology Reformulated: The Interface Between Economics and Sociology," The American Journal of Economics and Sociology, with Milan Zafirovski
- 1994: “Watching Eastern Europe, Thinking about Latin America,” in Transition to Capitalism? The Communist Legacy in Eastern Europe ed. by János Mátyás Kovács (Transaction Publishers)
- 1990: “16 Tomes and What Do You Get... The Caribbean Review Index: 1969-1989” Caribbean Review
- 1989:
  - “A Return to Innocence? The Social Construction of the Geopolitical Climate of the Post-Invasion Caribbean,” Journal of Interamerican Studies and World Affairs
  - “Policy Challenges of Puerto Rico’s 936 Program.” in Caribbean Basin Development: Challenges and Priorities for 1989 ed. by Catherine A. Pearson, Washington: Caribbean/Central American Action (Published under the byline of Eugenia Charles, prime minister of Dominica. Upon review, she changed two words.)
- 1988:
  - “An Inquiry into the Nature and Causes of the Wealth of Caribbean Nations. A Revision of Mr. Adam Smith’s Original Work, some 212 years later.” Report on “Enhancing Public/Private Partnerships for Trade, Development and Investment in the Caribbean,” for Global Economic Action Institute
  - “The Shifting Sands of Haitian Legitimacy,” and “After the Fall, Interviews with Leslie Manigat & Gerard Latortue,” Caribbean Review
- 1987: “Salpicar and Self-hate Among Puerto Ricans,” in Images and Identities: The Puerto Rican in Literature, ed. Asela Rodríguez de Laguna
- 1986: “Methodological Ironies in Marx and Weber,” International Journal of Moral and Social Studies (Oxford)
- 1985:
  - “Miami: The Capital of Latin America,” The Wilson Quarterly
  - “Model Wars in the Caribbean. Economic Strategies and Geopolitical Competition,” in John Tesatore and Susan Wolfson's The Asian Development Model and the Caribbean Basin Initiative
- 1983: “Reseña de la confrontación Latino-Caribeña: Ia interpretación social sobre ‘el Caribe’,” in Juan Tokatlian and Klaus Shubert’s Relaciones Internacionales en la Cuenca del Caribe y la Política de Colombia
- 1982: “Puerto Rico: Cashing Out Food Stamps,” Journal of the Institute of Socioeconomic Studies
- 1981: “Abundance and Scarcity in the Caribbean,” AMBIO, Journal of the Human Environment, The Royal Swedish Academy of Sciences
