= John F. O'Donnell =

American lawyer

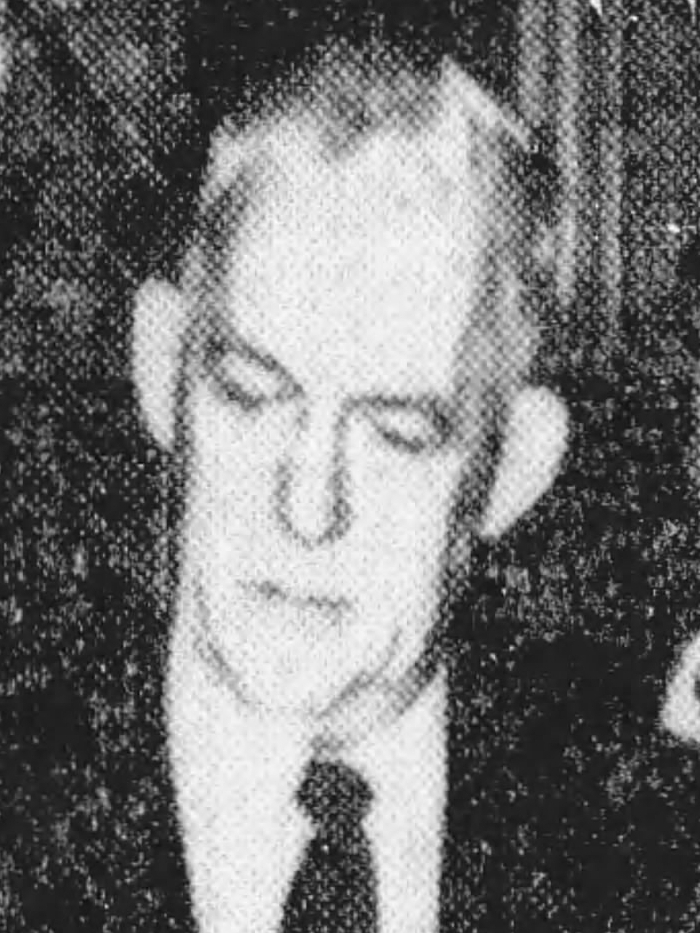
O'Donnell in 1959

John F. O'Donnell (c. 1908 – January 28, 1993) was an Irish-born 20th-century American "leading labor lawyer" who represented the national Transport Workers Union (TWU) (now Transport Workers Union of America) and American Postal Workers Union (APWU) and also "played a central role in New York City's transit strikes" from the 1930s to the 1980s.

== Background ==
O'Donnell was born in Donegal, Ireland. He had four brothers and three sisters. His support for the Irish Republican Army led to run-ins with British authorities, so he moved to New York City at age 20.

He studied first at City College of New York (CCNY) and then earned a law degree from Fordham University in 1937. He attended night classes. By day, he worked variously as elevator operator, grocery clerk, teacher of delinquents, and editorial writer for The Irish Echo.

== Career ==
In the 1930s, O'Donnell became aide and friend to (then) City Councilman Michael J. Quill, who went on to co-found the Transport Workers Union and became its president.

In the fall of 1938, O'Donnell was a Socialist Party of America candidate for what was then the Sixth District of The Bronx.

=== O'Donnell & Schwartz ===
In 1948 he and Asher Schwartz formed a law partnership in Manhattan (and in 1981 formed an affiliated law firm in Washington), for labor law and union clients.

Over the years, he partook in many "tense" transit negotiations, including the 11-day 1980 New York City transit strike.

In 1990, O'Donnell was still serving as general counsel to the Transport Workers Union, as indicated in his letter of December 18, 1990, to The New York Times, in which he voiced support for a strike by the New York Daily News "wholeheartedly."

=== Clients ===
O'Donnell served as general counsel for the Transport Workers Union from 1948. He also served as top lawyer for the American Postal Workers Union. Other clients included: International Brotherhood of Electrical Workers - Utilities Division - Local 3, Communications Workers of America - Locals 1101 and 1105, and Retail, Wholesale and Department Store Workers Union - Local 1S. (Schwartz served as counsel to the Newspaper and Mail Deliverers Union of New York and vicinity.)

=== Successes ===
Successes for the firm included:

- 1950: Helped win $1.1 million in back pay for workers on the old Third Avenue Railway.
- 1953: Helped win a five-day, 40-hour work week in a 28-day strike of eight bus lines.
- 1980: Helped win TWU a 9% raise in first year and 8% in second year, plus cost-of-living adjustment

== 1980 New York City transit strike ==
See 1980 New York City transit strike

As chief counsel, O'Donnell represented Local 100 of the Transport Workers Union during negotiations with the New York Transit Authority when Ed Koch was mayor of New York City. The strike had grown out of problems unresolved in the 1970s, largely over wages and the right (or not) to strike at all.

During the strike, O'Donnell stated:

(The TWU's "no contract no work policy") isn't set in concrete. The union has to adopt to changing circumstances and a changing world. The no contract, no work policy was adopted at a time when we had a lot of private employers and it never was carried out in every instance ... (Still), we would have as much right to strike as before.

He also noted that TWU had never held any "right" to strike because, in New York, strikes by public employees are illegal. (Partner Schwartz also addressed the issue of right to strike by public employees and to collective bargaining.)

=== Members ===
In 1972, members of the law firm included: O'Donnell, partner Ashter W. Schwartz, Michael Klein, Robert J. Dryfoos, George Maxwell, Sylvan Schwartz, Elaine LoSquadro, Joan Siegel, Nancy Harber, and Phyllis Longhi

Another member was Manlio DiPreta, who started his career with O'Donnell & Schwartz and negotiated three key contracts with New York's Transit Authority in the 1990s.

== Personal and death ==
O'Donnell married Gwendolyn Large. They had one son and three daughters.

"Mr. O'Donnell was known among labor insiders for his gargantuan cigars, Irish brogue, meticulous preparation and articulate presentation," reported The New York Times at his time of death.

He died of cancer at Northern Westchester Hospital in Mount Kisco, New York, on January 28, 1993. His wife Gwynne died in 2004.

== Legacy ==
Theodore W. Kheel, labor mediator, said of O'Donnell: "Some people specialize in problems, but he always was looking for the solutions."

== See also ==
- Michael J. Quill
- Transport Workers Union
- American Postal Workers Union
- International Brotherhood of Electrical Workers - Utilities
- Communications Workers of America
- Retail, Wholesale and Department Store Workers Union
- 1980 New York City transit strike
- Theodore W. Kheel
- Nathan Levine

== External sources ==
- Tamiment Library: Guide to the Transport Workers Union of America Records WAG.235
