= Nathan Levine =

American lawyer

- Born: Nathan L. Levine; January 18, 1911; Brooklyn, New York, U.S.
- Died: January 27, 1972 (aged 61); New York City, U.S.
- Cause of death: Gunshot wounds
- Occupation: Lawyer
- Years active: 1933–1972
- Known for: Role in Hiss-Chambers Case (1948)
- Spouse: Miriam Margolies
- Children: two sons
- Parent(s): Barnett Levine, Sophia Shemitz
- Relatives: Esther Shemitz, Reuben Shemitz, Sylvan Shemitz

Nathan Levine (January 18, 1911 – January 27, 1972) was an American labor lawyer and real estate attorney in Brooklyn, New York, who, as attorney for his uncle, Whittaker Chambers, testified regarding his uncle's "life preserver." This packet included papers handwritten by Alger Hiss and Harry Dexter White, as well as typewritten by the Hiss Family's Woodstock typewriter. It also included microfilms of documents, which U.S. Representative Richard M. Nixon and HUAC investigator Robert E. Stripling made widely known and which were dubbed the "Pumpkin Papers". They contributed to Hiss's indictment for perjury.

== Background ==
Nathan L. Levine was born on January 18, 1911, in Brooklyn, New York. His parents were Barnett Levine and Sophia Shemitz (sister of Reuben Shemitz and aunt of Sylvan Shemitz). Esther Shemitz later married Whittaker Chambers. Levine had one brother (Robert) and two sisters (Essie and Mildred).

== Career ==
In 1933, Levine became a lawyer, working throughout the late 1930s, as a labor lawyer. By 1940, he was also handling real estate cases such as assignments and receiverships.

In 1948, Levine had law offices at 152 West Forty-Second Street, New York. In 1956, he was part of O'Donnell & Schwartz, with offices at 2 West 45th Street in the City of New York.

Levine continued to work as an attorney until his death in 1972.

== Hiss Case ==
After defecting from the Soviet underground, Whittaker Chambers originally entrusted his "life preserver" to Ludwig Lore. In May–June 1938, however, he retrieved it and gave it instead to Nathan Levine. The "life preserver" was a thick manila envelope, full of papers (typewritten and handwritten) plus microfilm canisters. Instructions for his nephew were that, in the event of Chambers' disappearance or demise, Levine was to give the envelope to his aunt, Esther Shemitz Chambers.

The Hiss Case began with allegations made by Whittaker Chambers under subpoena to the House Un-American Activities Committee (HUAC) on August 3, 1948, which Alger Hiss began refuting on the same day. On August 27, 1948, Chambers answered questions about those allegations while on NBC Meet the Press radio show. In late September 1948, Hiss sued Chambers for slander in a federal court in Baltimore. During pre-trial proceedings, after the Hiss team roughly questioned his wife, Esther Shemitz, Chambers states he recalled his long-forgotten "life preserver."

On November 14, 1948, Levine took Chambers to his mother's house in Brooklyn, where together they retrieved the "life preserver."

Chambers describes:

I communicated with my wife's nephew, Nathan Levine, merely telling him that I was going to New York and asking him if he would have "my things" ready for me. It took him some time to think back ten years and figure out what my things might be . He, of course, had never known what was in the envelope which I had asked him to hide in 1938 ... Levine led me up to the second floor. [...] He led me to a bathroom, where, over the tub, a small window opened into a dumbwaiter shaft that had long been out of use. Inside the shaft was some kind of small shelf or ledge. There Levine had laid "my things"... He handed me an envelope that was big, plump and densely covered with the clotted cobwebs and dust of a decade. I opened the envelope and drew part way out the thick batch of copied State Department documents . At a glance, I saw that, besides those documents, and Hiss's handwritten memos, there were three cylinders of microfilm and a little spool of developed film (actually two strips) ... Levine came back with his broom and dustpan and asked me, as nearly as I remember, if I had found what I was looking for. [...] "Good God," I said, "I did not know that this still existed."

In late November and December 1948, newspapers reported on Levine's subpoenae to testify publicly and privately. He told the Grand Jury he was "pretty put out because the day before they had mentioned about spy papers and I found myself, an innocent pawn, in this thing. How do you think I feel?" On November 30, December 1, and December 10, 1948, he appeared before the House Un-American Activities Committee. On December 10, he also appeared before HUAC briefly in executive session.

Levine told HUAC:

At that time he [Chambers] had been in morbid fear of being liquidated by the Communists. He had indicated to me at times that because he was no longer with the Communists that they were going to either assassinate him or hurt him or members of his family. He and his wife and his two children—I think the second one was already born—had been around the country, going from place to place and we did not know where they were about that time.
On one or two occasions, I accompanied him to an appointment that he had, in which he was afraid that the appointment was a plant, and I went along for whatever advantage I could be or whatever protection I could be.
On the occasion of his giving me the package, he asked me to put it away for him and that if anything happened to him 1 was to give it to Esther, his wife. In the conversation we also asked—and when I say "we," I mean myself—I asked what would happen in the event both he and Esther were liquidated, and he said, "You would know what to do with it, you are an attorney."

On December 8, 1948, Levine appeared before a Grand Jury in New York City, which had been investigating communist espionage activities for several years and had already heard Hiss, Chambers, and others involved in the Hiss Case. On December 4, 1948, FBI agents questions Levine and reported next day (emphasis added on final sentence, which shows inter-agency rivalry):

When they interviewed Nathan Levine yesterday, they learned that the documents and films which Chambers produced had been secreted in Levine's mother's home in Brooklyn rather than in Levine's apartrment, according to information then in their possession. He said that they proposed to get in touch with Levine and, with the consent of Levine's mother, to search the mother's home for more documents. This step was being made as a protective measure, since the House Un-American Activities Committee may subpoena Levine, and if they turned up with some additional documents it would prove embarrassing to the Bureau.

On December 20, 1948, Time magazine reported:

One witness who appeared before the House committee was Nathan Levine, a New York attorney and a nephew of Mrs. Chambers, who said he had been the innocent custodian of the papers for the past ten years. In 1938, he said, Chambers had given him a large manila envelope to keep, instructing him to open it if anything happened to Chambers and his wife. "You are a lawyer, and will know what to do," Chambers had said.
One day last month, Levine continued, he received a telegram from Chambers: "Arriving Sunday at 10 o'clock. Have my things ready." Levine said he was not sure what Chambers meant. When Chambers arrived, he reminded Levine of the envelope. Together they went to Levine's mother's house at 260 Rochester Avenue, Brooklyn, where Levine had hidden the envelope on top of an unused dumbwaiter shaft. Levine testified that Chambers blew the dust off the envelope, opened it, glanced at the contents and exclaimed: "Holy cow! I didn't think this still existed." Chambers then took the envelope back to his Maryland farm. <

(Some Hiss supporters have made careful note that Levine testified that he never know what the contents of the "life preserver" were – implying that Chambers may have "doctored" them in 1948 in a manner never specified.)

== Personal life and death ==
Levine married Miriam Margolies and had two sons, Barry and David.

Levine's blood uncle, Reuben Shemitz, was also dragged into the Hiss Case.

On January 25, 1972, a client named Walter Stefani walked into the law offices of Levine at 501 Fifth Avenue, where he shot and critically wounded him. Levine died at St. Clare's Hospital in New York City from gunshot wounds on January 27, 1972, age 61.

== Legacy ==
Levine's interactions with Chambers led to the November 1948 recovery of the "life preserver" and presentation of part of it, the "Baltimore Documents," to Hiss team. Alger Hiss ordered his team to send those documents to the U.S. Department of Justice, obviously in the hope that Justice would indict Chambers. In early December 1948, HUAC member and U.S. Representative Richard M. Nixon subpoenaed Chambers for all remaining evidence, at which point Chambers produced the remainder, the "Pumpkin Papers" (microfilm). On December 15, 1948, a Grand Jury asked Hiss two key questions related to the "life preserver," which led to Hiss's trial and conviction on two counts of perjury–which in turn helped jumpstart a second Red Scare, commonly known as "McCarthyism."

There is no known connection between Levine's murder and the Hiss Case. After his death, several organizations published public sympathy for his family:

- A first law firm, including: John F. O'Donnell Ashter W. Schwartz, Michael Klein, Robert J. Dryfoos, George Maxwell, Sylvan Schwartz, Elaine LoSquadro, Joan Siegel, Nancy Harber, and Phyllis Longhi
- A second law firm, including Irving Michael, Stephen Kurcia, and Mike Beck
- Madison Club, Inc., of Brooklyn, including executive member Stanley Steingut
- Putnam Lake Jewish Center, including president Samuel Gitten

== See also ==
- Barry B. Levine
- Whittaker Chambers
- Esther Shemitz
- Reuben Shemitz
- Alger Hiss
- HUAC
- John F. O'Donnell

== External sources ==
- Getty Images Levine swears in before HUAC (November 30, 1948]
- Getty Images Levine before HUAC (December 1, 1948)
- Getty Images Levine house with Pumpkin Papers (December 9, 1948)
- TIME magazine Levine (Harris & Ewing)
