= Reuben Shemitz =

American lawyer

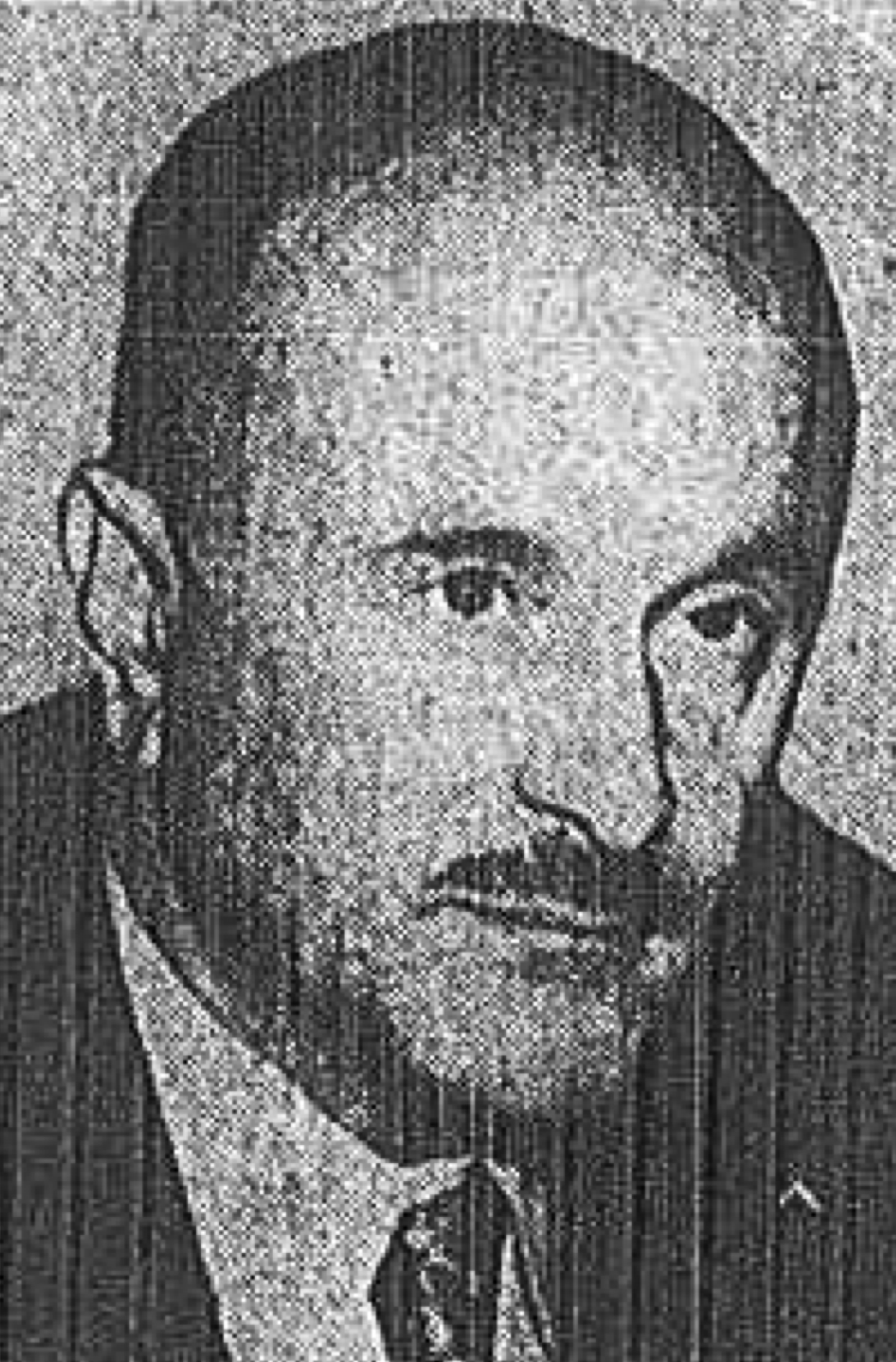
- Reuben Shemitz in December 1948
- Born: Reuben Shemitz; February 27, 1894; New York, New York
- Died: March 15, 1970 (aged 76); Brooklyn, New York
- Other names: Reuben Bob Shemitz, Reuben B. Shemitz, Reuben J. Shemitz, Reuben Benjamin Shemitz, Rubin Shemitz
- Education: Yale University's Sheffield Scientific School; New York University Law School
- Occupations: Labor and real estate lawyer
- Years active: 1924–1959
- Employer: Self
- Known for: Witness in Hiss-Chambers Case
- Spouse(s): Cecelia Essenfeld, Alice
- Children: Lois, Harry
- Parent(s): Rose Thorner, Benjamin Shemitz
- Relatives: Esther Shemitz (sister), Nathan Levine (nephew), Sylvan Shemitz (nephew)

Reuben B. Shemitz or Reuben Bob Shemitz (1894–1970) was an American attorney, older brother of Esther Shemitz, and brother-in-law of Whittaker Chambers: he testified during the Hiss Case.

== Background ==
Reuben Shemitz was born on February 27, 1894, in New York City. His parents were Rabbi Benjamin Shemitz and Rose Thorner, who had immigrated to the US in the 1890s from the "Podolsk Province." He was their oldest child born in the US and third-surviving child. After the birth of their last child (Esther Shemitz), they moved from New York City to New Haven, Connecticut, where they ran a candy store. In 1914-1915, Shemitz studied Engineering at the Sheffield Scientific School of Yale University but did not graduate.

== Career ==
=== World War I soldier ===
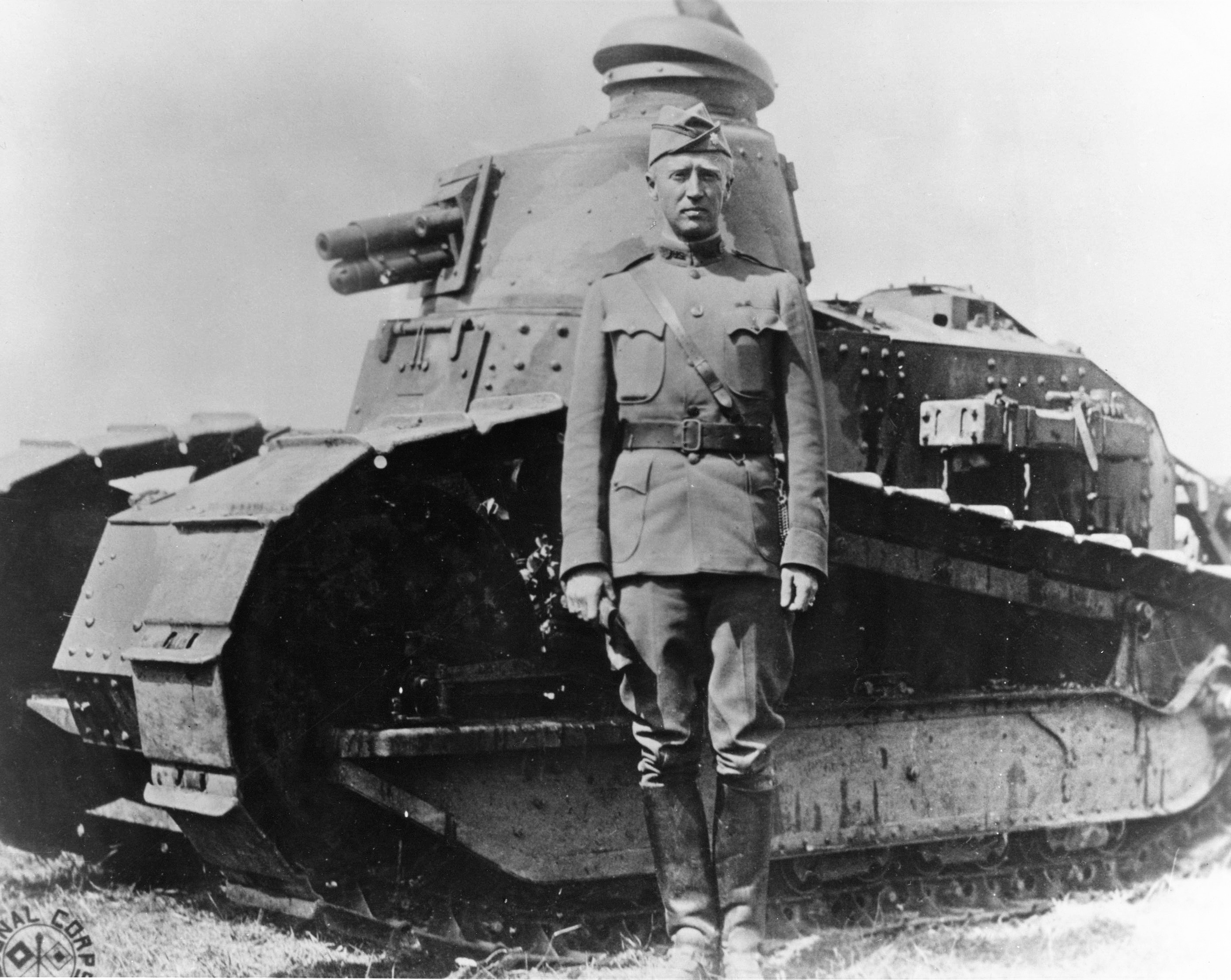
Shemitz served under Patton (here, in France in 1918 with a Renault FT tank)

Instead, Shemitz dropped out of school in circa 1916-1917 and joined the Troop A Cavalry of Connecticut to fight Pancho Villa in Mexico. Then, he fought under George S. Patton in France during World War I. He became a captain but was also gassed.

On the foggy morning of September 26, 1918, the first day of the Meuse-Argonne Offensive, Shemitz was serving in Patton's Tank Corps, attached to the First Army Corps (according to the eyewitness account of First Lieutenant Paul. S. Edwards, US Signal Corps). The corps overtook a reserve group of French and American tanks near Boureuilles on the road between Neuvilly and Varennes. As they proceeded, they passed through retreating infantry, whom Patton ordered to join them. Shortly thereafter, they stopped (at 04.7-72.7 reference map Verdun A 1/20000) under ever-heavier machine-gun fire.

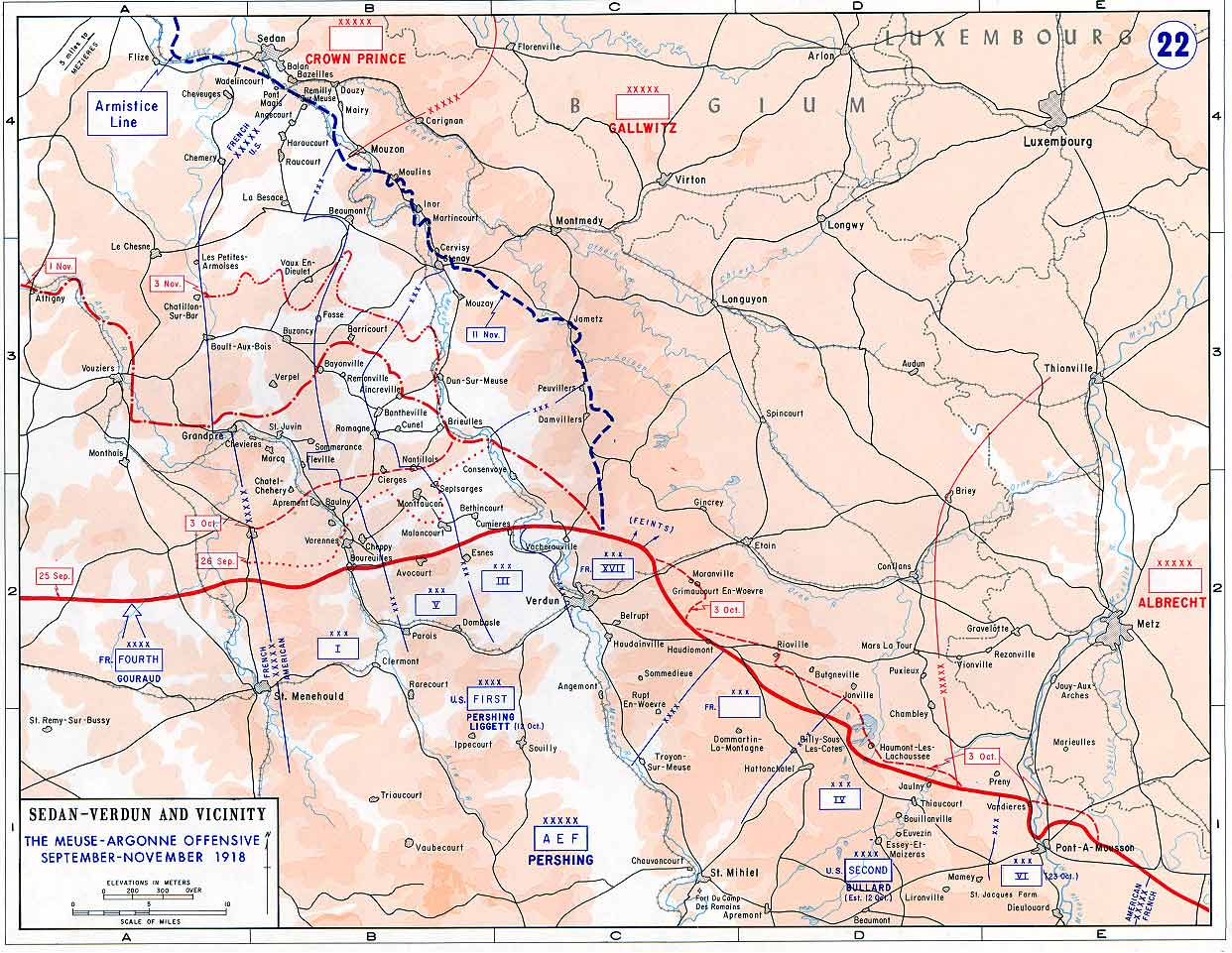
Sedan–Verdun and Vicinity: Shemitz fought in the Meuse-Argonne Offensive, September–November 1918 (c. 1938)

Patton ordered his men to a railroad cut. Then, he ordered reserve tanks forward toward the machine-guns. Trenches held up the tanks: Patton ordered French troops already in the trenches to dig a way through. Though heavy machine-gun fire continued, Patton himself took no cover, claiming "To hell with them: they can't hit me." When digging finally released the tanks, Patton and infantrymen followed. "Let's go get them! Who is with me?" Patton shouted. After a few yards, Patton was hit. "Sergeant Shemitz came running back" with the news of a Patton's wounding and searched for a stretcher. The machine-gun fire quickly lessened as the tanks advanced, and Patton was moved by stretcher to the rear. When Shemitz tried to sign up again for World War II under his leader, Patton declined his offer but with thanks. "Unless my memory is completely gone, you were the first man that got to me when I was wounded and laying in the mine field," Patton wrote.

Shemitz then went to New York University, where he studied law and graduated. In March 1921, while in law school, Shemitz (as "Robert Shemitz") and three other law students (Samuel Dilmer, Frank Edwards, and George Knob) found themselves accused as "conductors of the entertainment" during a police raid that arrested 125 people for a party on Third Avenue near Sixteen Street, New York City.

=== Lawyer ===
Shemitz began as a union defender in New Haven; his clients included a hat-makers union there.

In 1922, "R.B. Shemitz" was many of many firms granted a charter by the New York Secretary of State John J. Lyons.

In 1924, Shemitz passed the state bar exam.

In 1925, Shemitz represented Frank "Cowboy" Tessler, alleged leader of the "Cowboy" Tessler Gang, whose members were charged with 81 hold-ups and at least one murder. In October 1925, one member, Fred Leslie pled guilty to robbery. Other members included brother Arthur Leslie, Eugene Reising ("champion pistol shot and inventor of the Reising automatic pistol), and Harry Steinberg (jeweler on Third Avenue), and Peter Stroh.

In 1936, Shemitz represented a group of stockholders in a "seemingly simple equity suit." Stevens Coal Company filed for collection from stockholders of the defunct Bay Parkway National Bank of $4,700 for coal bought in 1931. Shemitz argued that his stockholders had not been served in the action, rendering them exempt from any assessment.

In 1936, he headed a committee of the New York County Criminal Courts Bar Association to inquire into official conduct of Magistrate W. Overton Harris. In 1937, Shemitz lost 29 to 41 to Robert Daru (former Deputy Assistant District Attorney) as president of the New York County Criminal Courts Bar Association at the annual election in the Criminal Court Building yesterday.

In 1942, Shemitz represented plaintiffs in Home Owners vs. Mayer Cohen et al. In 1943, he represented plaintiffs in Home Owners vs. Michael DeCandio et al.

=== Hiss case: death threats ===
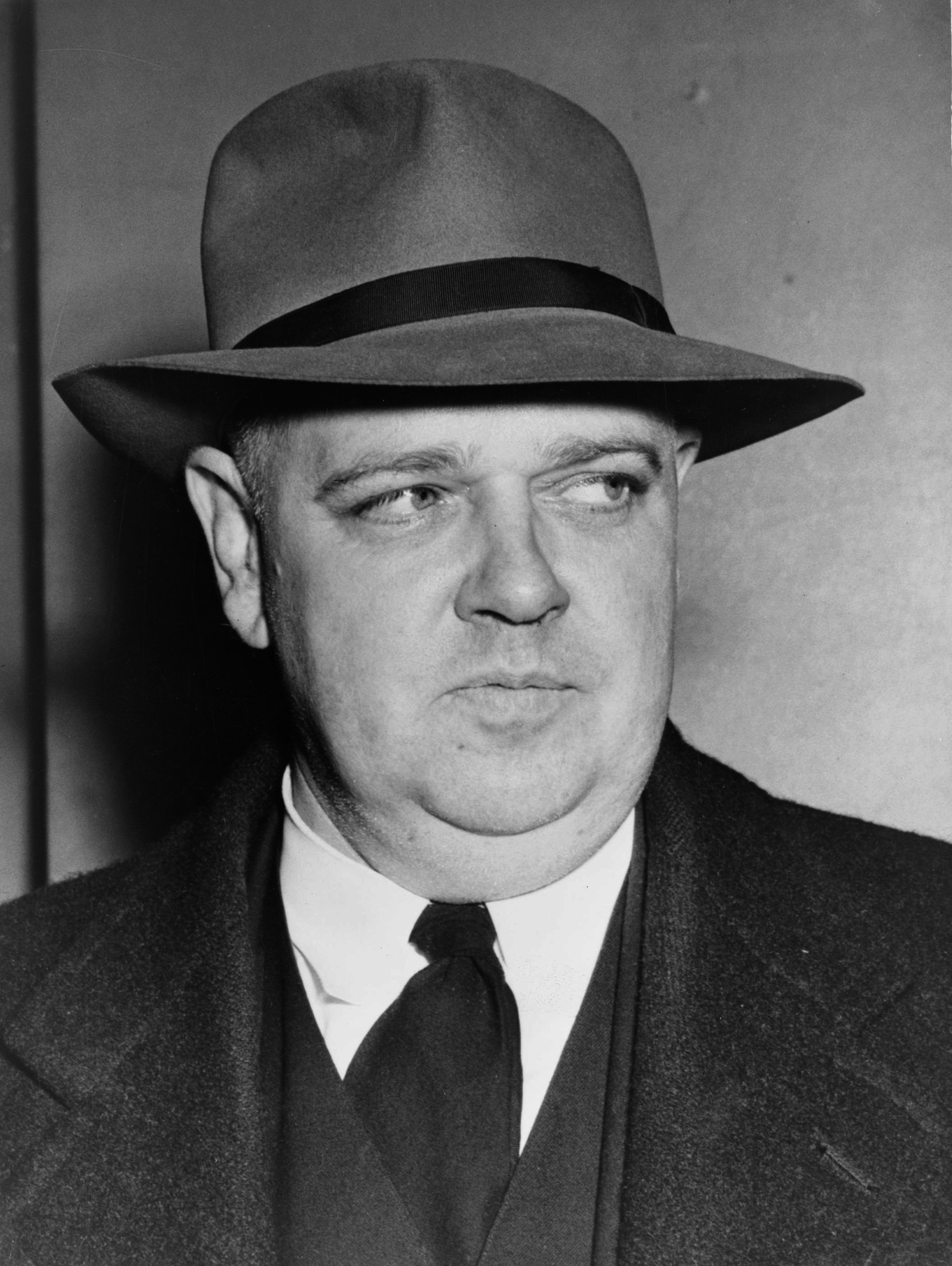
Shemitz testified for his brother-in-law, Whittaker Chambers (here, circa 1948) during the Hiss Case

In 1921, Shemitz listed his residence at 260 Rochester Avenue, Brooklyn, New York. By 1937, this home would belong to his older sister Sophia Shemitz Levine, and its dumbwaiter served as hiding place for the "life preserver" of Whittaker Chambers, a large manila envelope that contained both the Baltimore Documents and the Pumpkin Papers. In 1948, Chambers would call on Sophia's son Nathan Levine, and they would retrieve the life preserver together.

In 1937–1938, while defecting from the Soviet underground, Shemitz's brother-in-law Whittaker Chambers and sister Esther used him as their attorney. For the 1937 purchase of the "Shaw Place" in Westminster, Maryland (where Chambers would hide his family after April 1938), documents were signed "J.W. Chambers, c/o Reuben Shemitz, Attorney" with Shemitz's New York business address.

On December 13, 1948, Shemitz testified before a grand jury about Chambers. A few days later, he spoke to the press, stating that Grace Hutchins had visited his office several times in April 1938 with death threats against Chambers. He noted that Hutchins had run for various public offices on the Communist Party ticket. She had was also a witness of the marriage of Esther Shemitz and Whittaker Chambers in 1931. Shemitz said, "I never knew a 'Grace Hutchlns'" and that she had introduced herself as "Grace Stevens" of the Labor Research Association. (On December 15, 1948, Hutchins denied his allegation and added that she had not seen the Chambers in 11–13 years.) He said:

She said she wanted to see him on a 'matter of life and death'... She assured me that no harm would come to my sister or her children if Whit would get in touch with someone known to Whit as Steve (J. Peters).

Chambers recorded in his 1952 memoir:

There strode into my brother-in-law's office one morning a rather striking-looking white-haired woman, about fifty years old. She told the receptionist that Miss Grace Hutchins wished to see Mr. Shemitz. Mr. Shemitz was in court. So Miss Hutchins scribbled a note which she left for him...
When my brother-in-law finally returned from court after four o'clock, Miss Hutchins was still waiting for him. In his private office, she came to the point at once: "If you will agree to turn Chambers over to us," she said, "the party will guarantee the safety of your sister and the children." My startled brother-in-law, who, like most Americans, was completely unaware of what Communism is really like (we had never discussed the subject), tried to explain that he did not know even the whereabouts of his sister, her husband or their children... "If he does not show up by (such and such a day)," she said briskly, "he will be killed." With that she left...
Terrified by the visit and unable to warn us, he was frantic. He rushed to the only two people he could think of who might know where we were... Neither of them could help him.

=== Later life ===
In 1957, Shemitz represented the defendant in De Miglio vs. Paez: Paez was consul general of Venezuela.

In 1959, he represented plaintiffs in Boro Park Hospital Building vs. Hartnett.

== Personal life and death ==
In 1920, Shemitz listed his residence at 676 Chapel Street, New Haven, Connecticut. In 1921, he listed his residence at 260 Rochester Avenue, Brooklyn, New York. In 1932, he was living at 1133 Broadway in Manhattan. In 1948, he was living at 1463 E. 18th Street, Manhattan. Later, he back moved to Brooklyn.

In June 1923, he married Cecelia Essenfeld and had a daughter Lois. They divorced acrimoniously in 1935, and Shemitz forced the sale of their home in 1939. Later, he married Alice and adopted her son as Harry A. J. Shemitz, who attended Syracuse University.

In 1940, Shemitz was robbed in the seventh-floor washroom of 217 Broadway in Manhattan, where he was closing a real estate transaction. His offices moved about the city. In 1925–1926, his law offices were located at 1 Madison Avenue in Manhattan. In 1936, his offices were at 8 Reade Street, Manhattan. In 1942 and 1948, his law offices were located at 276 5th Avenue in Manhattan.

In 1950, Shemitz served as a trustee for the Third Kings Masonic Camp Fund, Inc., for its 20th anniversary. He was a grand steward of the Third Kings Masonic section in Brooklyn of the Grand Lodge, Free and Accepted Masons of New York State. He also served in the Union Temple of Brooklyn.

Reuben Shemitz died on March 15, 1970.

== Patents ==
Shemitz filed a patent for an electroplating device in January 1928.

== See also ==
- Esther Shemitz
- Nathan Levine
- Sylvan Shemitz
- Whittaker Chambers

== External sources ==
- Poor's Register of Directors and Executives, United States and Canada, Part 2. Standard and Poor's Corporation. 1957. p. 2897.
- Alumni Directory of Yale University: Graduates and Non-graduates 1920. Yale University. 1920. p. 329.
- "March Yahrzeits" (PDF). Congregation Mishkan Israel. March 2016.
- "Electroplating Device US 1739657 A". U.S. Patent Office. December 17, 1928.
