= Duncan Norton-Taylor =

American journalist

- Born: 1904
- Died: September 13, 1982 (aged 77–78); Easton, Maryland, US
- Education: Brown University
- Occupations: journalist, editor
- Years active: 1939–1965
- Employer(s): Time, Fortune
- Spouse: Margaret Scott
- Children: 3

Duncan Norton-Taylor was an American journalist who was a senior editor at Time magazine and managing editor at Fortune magazine from the 1940s through the 1960s.

== Background ==
Norton-Taylor graduated Brown University, where he worked at The Brown Jug.

== Career ==
Upon graduating, Norton-Taylor began work as a newspaper reporter.

He joined Time as a writer in 1939, the same year as his long-time colleague and friend, Whittaker Chambers. In 1940, William Saroyan lists him among "contributing editors" at Time in the play, Love's Old Sweet Song. Norton-Taylor and Chambers both rose to become senior editors.

In 1951, Norton-Taylor became an editor at Fortune. In 1959, he became Fortune's managing editor. In 1965, he stepped down and joined Fortune's board of editors.

In 2012, Fortune republished an article by Norton-Taylor called "How Top Executives Live" from 1955.

== Personal ==
Norton-Taylor married Margaret Scott. They had three daughters: Susan Norton-Taylor May, Nancy Norton-Taylor Tomson, and Joan Norton-Taylor. He lived in Oxford, Maryland in retirement from 1967 onwards. He died on Monday, September 13, 1982, at Memorial Hospital in nearby Easton, Maryland, after a stroke, aged 78. Surviving him were his wife, daughters, and nine grandchildren.

(His great-grandson, Scott Laudati, is the author of "Hawaiian Shirts In The Electric Chair", a book of poetry published in 2014 by Kuboa Press.)

== Works ==
Norton-Taylor wrote and edited more than half a dozen books.

=== Books written ===
- With My Heart in My Mouth (1944)
- I Went to See for Myself (1945)
- God's Man: A Novel on the Life of John Calvin (1979)

=== Books edited ===
- Cold Friday by Whittaker Chambers, edited and with an introduction by Duncan Norton-Taylor (1964)
- The Celts, Duncan Norton-Taylor and the editors of Time-Life Books (1974)
- For Some, the Dream Came True: The Best from 50 years of Fortune Magazine, selected and edited by Duncan Norton-Taylor (1981)

=== Adaptations ===
- Beautiful but Young: A Contest Selection by Olive White Fortenbacher, arranged from Duncan Norton-Taylor's story of the same name (1932)

== See also ==
- Time magazine
- Fortune magazine
- Whittaker Chambers
