= Sylvan Shemitz =

American designer

Sylvan R. Shemitz (April 18, 1925 – July 5, 2007) was an American architectural lighting designer best known for his work on Grand Central Terminal in New York City and the Jefferson Memorial in Washington D.C.

== Personal life ==
Shemitz was born in New Haven, Connecticut, in 1925 from a family of Ukrainian Jews. His aunts and uncles included attorney Reuben Shemitz and artist Esther Shemitz; his cousins included attorney Nathan Levine.

Shemitz served in the U.S. Navy during World War II. He went on to complete his education at the University of Pennsylvania and the Wharton School. His work with higher education continued throughout his life. Shemitz was a fellow at the Illuminating Engineering Society of North America and taught as a visiting lecturer at a number of schools including Yale University, the Rhode Island School of Design and Princeton University.

He was described as an avid boater and yacht racer. Shemitz completed the race from Newport, Rhode Island, to Bermuda on twelve different occasions. He also ran numerous yacht races throughout the Long Island Sound on his beloved boat "Light Fantastic".

== Innovations ==
Shemitz invented a type of "ambient office lighting" called Tambient. Tambient lighting is currently used by a wide range of firms, including Bell Atlantic, 3M, IBM and Crowley Maritime.

Shemitz also held patents for a number of innovations regarding asymmetric lighting, which he marketed under the Elliptipar brand name. Asymmetrical lighting is used in a variety of famous public buildings including the New York Public Library, the Steven Holl-designed Nelson-Atkins Museum of Art in Kansas City, Missouri, and the grand concourse at Las Vegas' Venetian Hotel.

== Design career ==
Shemitz is, perhaps, most famous for his work with the Grand Central Terminal in Manhattan. He used "blue filtered tints" and magenta colored lighting to accent the exterior façade architectural elements of Grand Central. He explained his reasoning for his choice of colors in a 1991 interview with The New York Times, "I think the most important issue is to make New York a lively, friendly and joyful place." He is also well known for his work on the Jefferson Memorial in Washington, D.C.

Shemitz worked very closely with the important design architects whose buildings he illuminated. For example, according to the New York Times, Shemitz worked with architect Helmut Jahn "to create a glowing glass shed intended as a modern take on a grand European rail station" at the United Airlines terminal at O'Hare International Airport in Chicago, Illinois.

Shemitz's other projects in his portfolio included the Toronto's CN Tower, the Yale University's Lillian Goldman Law Library and the Schneider Children's Medical Center of Israel.

Shemitz was chief executive at the Sylvan R. Shemitz Designs, a lighting manufacturer based in New Haven, Connecticut, that he founded in 1963.

== Death ==
Shemitz died of an apparent heart attack on July 5, 2007, while sailing on Long Island Sound in the boat, the Light Fantastic. He was 82 years old. Shemitz was survived by his wife, Paula Shemitz, three daughters and two grandchildren. He and his wife were residents of Woodbridge, Connecticut.

== See also ==
- Reuben Shemitz
- Nathan Levine
- Esther Shemitz
