= Hope Hale Davis =

American author

Hope Hale Davis (née Frances Hope Hale; November 2, 1903 – October 2, 2004) was an American feminist (or "proto-feminist") and communist who later became a writer and writing teacher.

== Background ==
Davis was born Frances Hope Hale on November 2, 1903, in Iowa City, Iowa, the fifth and youngest child of Hal Hale, a school superintendent, and Frances McFarland, a teacher. Her father died young, and her mother remarried to John Overholt. When her stepfather died, too, Davis and her mother moved to Washington, D.C.

There, Davis studied at the new Corcoran School of Art and George Washington University, as well as the University of Cincinnati and the Portland School of Art. She did not obtain a college degree.

== Career ==
In 1924, Davis became assistant to the Stuart Walker Repertory Company's art director, for whom she painted scenery and designed costumes. In 1926, she moved to New York City, where she worked in advertising as a secretary at the Frank Presbrey Agency. There, she wrote copy and sold drawings. She left to become a freelance writer, publishing stories in magazines such as Collier's, The New Yorker, and Bookman. In 1929, she became promotion manager for Life magazine. In 1931, she founded and edited Love Mirror, a women's pulp magazine.

In February 1933, she moved to Washington, D.C., where she worked on the Consumers' Counsel of the Agricultural Adjustment Administration (AAA) under Frederic C. Howe. Her third husband, German economist Karl Brunck, worked for the National Recovery Administration.

She joined the Soviet spy ring called the "Ware Group", as recounted later in her memoir. In 1934, one group meeting included J. Peters, Lee Pressman, Marion Bachrach, and John Abt. Other members allegedly included Harold Ware, Charles Kramer, Alger Hiss, Nathaniel Weyl, Laurence Duggan, Harry Dexter White, Abraham George Silverman, Nathan Witt, Julian Wadleigh, Henry Collins, and Victor Perlo.

After Brunck's death, Davis returned to New York City, where she worked as a freelance writer, crafting short stories with underlying Communist themes. During her years married to Robert Gorham Davis, she edited his work while writing herself for Redbook and Town & Country, and New Leader magazines.

In 1954, she and her husband Robert Gorham Davis spoke to the FBI about both of their participation in the Communist Party of the United States. She identified Len De Caux and his wife, Herman Brunce, John and Elizabeth Donovan, Harold Ware, Charles Kramer and his wife, John Abt and his wife Jessica Smith Ware Abt and his sister Marion Bachrach, Jacob Golos, Joseph Freeman, and Joe Currant, along with Pressman, Perlo, Silverman, Collins, Witt. Written in the interview notes the FBI took: "At this time in the interview Mrs. Davis made the statement that despite the great amount of publicity afforded Alger Hiss and his brother, Donald Hiss, in the public press, she as of this interview cannot recall having known these individuals as Communist Party members, nor can she recall hearing from the above named individuals that the Hiss brothers were members of the Communist Party at this time."

In 1983-84 she was a fellow at the Bunting Institute at Radcliffe College. In 1985, she received an invitation to remain as a visiting scholar. She taught a class in writing from 1985 until a month before her death. Seminar titles included "How to Keep a Journal" and "Autobiography as Detective Story."

== Personal life ==
Davis briefly married her first husband, vaudeville scenery designer George Patrick Wood. In 1932, Davis married her second husband, British journalist Claud Cockburn. They did not live together and divorced in 1934 when Cockburn purportedly abandoned Davis while she was pregnant. Their daughter was Claudia Cockburn (died 1998), who married British performer Michael Flanders (died 1975) and had two daughters, journalists Stephanie and Laura Flanders.

In 1934, she married German economist and Communist Karl Hermann Brunck, who suffered a breakdown and entered a mental institution for treatment by psychologist Frieda Fromm-Reichmann. He committed suicide in 1937.

In 1939, she left the Communist Party over the Hitler–Stalin Pact, though she remained a "committed leftist". Davis obituaries state that, when Whittaker Chambers met with New Dealer Adolf A. Berle in 1939, he named Davis as a member of the Ware Group, although he did not cite her name during subpoenaed testimony before HUAC on August 3, 1948; in fact, the Berle Notes show no such fact.

That same year, she married fellow Communist, professor, and literary critic Robert Gorham Davis (died 1998), whom she met during a congress of the League of American Writers; the couple had two children, Stephen and Lydia. In the 1950s and 1960s, the Davises lived on the Upper West Side of New York City and were friends with Bernard Malamud, Lionel Trilling, and Diana Trilling. In the 1970s, they moved to Connecticut. In 1983, they moved to Boston after she received a fellowship from Radcliffe.

== Death ==
Hope Hale Davis died of pneumonia in Boston on October 2, 2004, at age 100.

== Legacy ==
At her death, the Guardian called her an "American author who defied social conventions with her feminist, leftwing beliefs". The New York Sun called her a "semi-regretful ex-communist".

Davis's 1994 memoir recounts her membership in and details of the Soviet infiltration apparatus called the 1930s "Ware Group," which was controlled by J. Peters, founded by Harold Ware, and run successively by Ware, Whittaker Chambers, and Victor Perlo. Her book served as a major source for a biography of J. Peters by scholar Thomas L. Sakmyster.

Her papers include correspondence with numerous communists, New York intellectuals, and even Ware Group members, including Malcolm Cowley, Alfred Kazin, Philip Roth, Arthur M. Schlesinger Jr., Diana Trilling, Sylvia Townsend Warner, and Nathaniel Weyl. (The online reference leaves out reference to most Ware Group members, however, including J. Peters, Harold Ware, Whittaker Chambers, and those named by Chambers before HUAC in August 1948.)

== Works ==
Of her 1994 memoir, Kirkus wrote: "Davis's account of that experience is masterful; she captures the intrigue of underground culture and the seductive, even irresistible, logic of Communist solutions, as well as Party operatives' frightening refusal to see contradictions or hear dissent."

Books:

- The Dark Way to the Plaza (New York: Doubleday, 1968)
- Great Day Coming: A Memoir of the 1930s (Hanover, NH: Steerforth Press, 1994)
- While Venice Sinks (unpublished)

Articles:

- "Musings of a Connoisseur" (New Yorker, 1931)
- "Real Romance" (New Yorker, 1939)
- "Wonderful Visit" (New Yorker, 1942)
- "A Memoir: Looking Back on My Years in the Party" (New Leader, 1980)

== See also ==
- Ware Group
- Claud Cockburn
- Claudia Cockburn
- Stephanie Flanders
- Laura Flanders

== Sources ==
- "Davis, Hope Hale. Papers of Hope Hale Davis, 1831-1835, 1916-2002". Harvard University Library. August 2007. Archived from the original on April 3, 2017.
