= Harry Magdoff and espionage =

Harry Magdoff was accused by a number of authors as having been complicit in Soviet espionage activity during his time in US government. He was accused of passing information to Soviet intelligence networks in the United States, primarily through what the FBI called the "Perlo Group." Magdoff was never indicted, but after the end of the Cold War, a number of scholars have inspected declassified documents (including those of the Venona project) from U.S. and Soviet archives. They cite these documents to support the claim that Magdoff was involved in espionage. Other authors have taken issue with some of the broader interpretations of such materials which implicate many Americans in espionage for the Soviet Union, and the allegation that Harry Magdoff was an information source for the Soviets is disputed by several academics and historians asserting that Magdoff probably had no malicious intentions and committed no crimes.

== Investigation ==
An FBI file description says Magdoff and others were probed as part of "a major espionage investigation spanning the years 1945 through 1959" into a suspected "Soviet spy ring which supposedly had 27 individuals gathering information from at least six Federal agencies. However, none of the subjects were indicted by the Grand Jury."^{1}

Soviet cable from New York to Moscow on 13 April 1944, refers to MAGDOFF – "KANT".

A mass of previously unremarked materials collectively known as the Venona project was declassified by the U.S. government in 1995. Among these were Army decryptions of Soviet cables which revealed there to be some number of American citizens involved in espionage on behalf of the Soviet Union. Magdoff was among those investigated as a member of what was called the Perlo group.

The public accusation that Magdoff was working for Soviet intelligence was itself not new; it had originated with defector Elizabeth Bentley who provided this information to the FBI and later testified to that same effect in open hearings. Bentley told the FBI:

On the date specified I went to the apartment of John Abt, was admitted by him to his apartment and there met four individuals, none of whom I had ever seen before. They were introduced to me as Victor Perlo, Charlie Kramer, Henry Magdoff and Edward Fitzgerald. They seemed to know, at least, generally that they could talk freely in my presence and I recall some conversation about their paying Communist Party dues to me, as well as my furnishing them with Communist Party literature. There followed then a general discussion among all of us as to the type of information which these people, excepting Abt, would be able to furnish. It was obvious to me that these people, including Abt, had been associated for some time and that they had been engaged in some sort of espionage for Earl Browder. ^{2}

Victor Perlo, leader of the group, asked if the material was going to "Uncle Joe" (Joseph Stalin, General Secretary of the Communist Party of the Soviet Union).

The Army Signals Intelligence Corp and the FBI conducted a thirty-eight-year investigation into communist espionage with mixed results. According to Counterintelligence Reader, the Venona project confirms the accuracy of much of Bentley's testimony. Critics of Bentley point out that some of her claims were disputed at the time, and that the testimony of Bentley and others before various Congressional committees during the Red Scare was sometimes exaggerated or involved guilt by association assertions.

== Decrypted cables ==
According to A Counterintelligence Reader, Magdoff was a member of the Perlo group.^{3} Magdoff was identified by Arlington Hall cryptographers in the Venona cables and by FBI counterintelligence investigators as being a possible Soviet information source using the cover name "KANT" as of 1944. ^{4} The name "KANT" appears in declassified decryptions from New York to Moscow, dated 5, 13 and 30 May 1944. The first is described by the decrypters as being sent from Pavel Ivanovich Fedosimov in which he requests to "telegraph a reply to No. 139 and advise about the possibility of a meeting with KANT."

On 13 May cable, "MAYOR", according to Arlington Hall counterintelligence Iskhak Abdulovich Akhmerov, reports on the first meeting Elizabeth Bentley had with the Perlo group for the purposes of obtaining secret government information to transmit to the Soviet Union. Magdoff's surname was transmitted in the clear. ^{5}

On HELMSMAN'S instructions GOOD GIRL contracted through AMT a new group:

[53 groups unrecoverable]

MAGDOFF – "KANT". GOOD GIRL's impressions: They are reliable FELLOWCOUNTRYMEN ["members of a Communist Party"], politically highly mature; they want to help with information. They said that they had been neglected and no one had taken any interest in their potentialities.

Magdoff at the time was ending a prolonged leave of absence due to a gall bladder operation was unsure of the type of material he could deliver.^{6} As a person targeted by Soviet intelligence as a potential recruit, or "probationer" in Soviet parlance, "KANT" was subject to a background check and a request was made for more information. The 30 May cable transmits personal histories for several members of the group.

25 February 1945; Vassiliev, Haynes believe "TAN" to be a latter day cover name for Magdoff.

2. "KANT" became a member of the CPUSA a long time ago, being [8 groups unrecovered], works in the Machine Tool Division of the DEPOT.

A number of U.S. government agencies (as well as locations within the U.S.) were also given cover names. In this case, "DEPOT" is said by NSA analysts to be code for the War Production Board, where Magdoff worked in the Statistics and Tools Divisions.

== Moscow Archives ==
In Moscow the request was processed. Evidence was unearthed in the Comintern Archives in the late 1980s has Lt. General Pavel Fitin, head of KGB foreign intelligence operations, requesting of Comintern Secretary General Georgi Dimitrov, information to pursue Magdoff's recruitment. ^{7} This document was published in a book by historians Harvey Klehr, John Earl Haynes, and Fridrikh Igorevich Firsov ^{8}, and also in the memoirs of the Soviet Case Officer for Julius Rosenberg and Klaus Fuchs, Alexandre Feklisov, ^{9} published in 2001.

The Moscow Center then responded to New York KGB headquarters on 25 February 1945 in Venona decrypt #179,180. The authors of Haunted Wood: Soviet Espionage in America, researchers Allen Weinstein, currently Archivist of the United States, and ex-KGB Officer Alexander Vassiliev say cover name "KANT" was replaced with "TAN". Moscow Center expressed concern that knowledge of some persons being recruited was widely known among other CPUSA members, so it was not uncommon for code names to change. The code name "TAN" appears Anatoly Gorsky's Memo dated December 1948, a document from the KGB archives analyzed by Alexander Vassiliev. ^{10} Gorsky was then a senior official of the Committee of Information (KI), the Soviet agency at the time supervising Soviet foreign intelligence. ^{11}

A top secret internal FBI memo dated 1 February 1956 from Assistant Alan H. Belmont to the Director and head of the FBI's Internal Security Section, L. V. Boardman, discusses the advantages and disadvantages of using Venona materials to prosecute suspects. In this memorandum, which remained classified forty-one years until the Moynihan Moynihan Commission on Government Secrecy obtained its release to the public in 1997, Boardman quotes the 13 May 1944 Venona transcript, which named several members of the Perlo group, including Magdoff. Though Belmont was of the opinion that Venona evidence could lead to successful convictions, it was ultimately decided, in consideration of compromising the Army Signals Intelligence efforts, that there would not be prosecutions. The memo also raises questions about the disclosure of classified information to unauthorized persons based upon an exception to the hearsay rule requiring expert testimony of cryptographers revealing their practices and techniques to identify specific code names. ^{12}

== Chronology ==
- 25 February or 5 March 1944, a rainy Sunday, Elizabeth Bentley meets with Harry Magdoff and others in John Abt's apartment in New York, the initial contact with the Perlo group (Haynes and Klehr, Venona, 1999, pg. 409); "the group specifically discussed the information they would be able to furnish her and with respect to Magdoff, Bentley advised, '.....Magdoff, who had just returned from a period of approximately six months hospitalization, expected to return to the War Production Board but was uncertain as to what specifically he would be able to furnish.....' " (pg. 182, paragraph 3)
- 5 May 1944, Venona decrypt 629 KGB New York to Moscow asks to "Urgently...advise about the possibility of a meeting with KANT"; KANT identified as Harry Samuel Magdoff.
- 13 May 1944, Venona decrypt 687 KGB New York to Moscow reports on Bentley's contact with a new group in Washington, "MAGDOFF – KANT"..."reliable"...politically highly mature"..."they want to help with information". KANT identified as Harry Samuel Magdoff.*KGB agent & Earl Browder instruct Bentley on new recruits, Venona 687 New York to Moscow, 13 May 1944.
- 30 May 1944, Venona 769, 771 KGB New York to Moscow, addressed to KGB head Pavel Fitin the probationers of the new group gives personal histories, " 'KANT' became a member of the CPUSA a long time ago...works in the Machine Tool Division of the DEPOT" (KGB NY Reports on new Agents from ACP working in US Govt, Venona 769, 771 KGB New York to Moscow, 30 May 1944, p. 1); KANT identified as Harry Samuel Magdoff. (p. 3)
- 29 September 1944, in Moscow, Fitin to Dimitrov Memo asks to Comintern General Secretary to provide any information to KGB head on members of the Perlo group, including "Magdoff, works on the WPB."
- 25 February 1945, Moscow Center to Venona to New York 179, 180 KGB Moscow, uses code name "TAN"; subsequent researchers identify TAN as Harry Magdoff.
- 20 December 1946, "Magdoff indicated that he was happy to be leaving the Commerce Department..." (pg. 176).
- 30 December 1946, Magdoff retires from government service.
- December 1948, Anatoly Gorsky, senior official of the Committee of Information (KI), the agency then supervising Soviet foreign intelligence reports in KGB file 43173 vol.2 (v) lists Magdoff as number "3. 'Tan' – Harry Magdoff, former employee of the Commerce Department" of Elizabeth Bentley's contacts in his report on compromised American sources and networks; NKVD operatives are ranked either alphabetically or in chronological order, beginning with pre-World War II names, followed by World War II names, with the Soviet Case Officer himself the last in line.
- 1 February 1956, FBI Belmont to Boardman Memo discusses prosecution of the members of the Perlo group, including " 'Kant' (Harry Magdoff)" but weighs the disclosure of Government techniques and practices in the cryptography field to unauthorized persons and would compromise the Government's efforts in the communications intelligence field.

== Notes ==
^1 FBI Silvermaster group file, Overview from web index page.
^2 FBI Silvermaster group file, Part 2c, p. 182 (p. 3 in PDF format).
^3 United States. National Counterintelligence Center. A Counterintelligence Reader. NACIC, no date. <https://web.archive.org/web/20050224074214/http://www.nacic.gov/history/CIReaderPlain/Vol3Chap1.pdf>, vol.3 chap.1, pg.31,: "The following were members of the Victor Perlo group....Harry Magdoff: Statistical Division of WPB and Office of Emergency Management; Bureau of Research and Statistics, WTB; Tools Division, War Production Board; Bureau of Foreign and Domestic Commerce, Commerce Department."
^4 Venona 629 KGB New York to Moscow, 5 May 1944.
^5 KGB agent & Earl Browder instruct Bentley on new recruits, Venona 687 New York to Moscow, 13 May 1944.
^6 FBI Silvermaster group file, Part 2c, p. 182 (p. 3 in PDF format).
".....Magdoff, who had just returned from a period of approximately six months hospitalization, expected to return to the War Production Board but was uncertain as to what specifically he could be able to furnish....."
^7 Wikisource:Fitin to Dimitrov, 29 September 1944.
^8 Klehr, Haynes, and Firsov, The Secret World of American Communism, 1995, p. 312 (Document 90)
^9 "A NKVD/NKGB Report to Stalin: A Glimpse into Soviet Intelligence in the United States in the 1940s" Vladimir Pozniakov, Woodrow Wilson International Center for Scholars Cold War History Project Virtual Archive: "Feklisov, pp. 65–105; M. Vorontsov, Capt. 1st rank, Chief Navy Main Staff, Intelligence Directorate, and Petrov, Military Commissar, NMS, ID to G. Dimitrov, 15 August 1942, No. 49253ss, typewritten original; G. Dimitrov to Pavel M. Fitin, 20 November 1942, No. 663, t/w copy; P. M. Fitin to G. Dimitrov, 14 July 1944, No. 1/3/10987, t/w copy; P. M. Fitin to G. Dimitrov, 29 September 1944, No. 1/3/16895, t/w copy. All these documents are NMS ID and FCD Chiefs' requests for information related to Americans and naturalized American citizens working in various US Government agencies and private corporations, some of whom had been CPUSA members. The last two are related to a certain Donald Wheeler (an OSS official), Charles Floto or Flato (who in 1943 worked for the "...Dept. of Economic Warfare"), and Harry Magdoff (War Production Board) -the request dated 29 Sept. 1944-and to Judith Coplon who according to the FCD information worked for the Dept. of Justice.- RTsKhIDNI, f. 495, op. 74, d. 478, l. 7; d. 484, l. 34; d. 485, l. 10, 14, 17, 31, 44."
^10 "Alexander Vassiliev’s Notes on Anatoly Gorsky’s December 1948 Memo on Compromised American Sources and Networks (Annotated)," John Earl Haynes: "3. "Tan" – Harry Magdoff, former employee of the Commerce Department."
^11 Ibid.
^12 "VENONA: FBI Documents of Historic Interest Re VENONA That Are Referenced In Daniel P. Moynihan's Book, 'Secrecy,'" pgs. 68–71
^13 Nigel West, Venona: The Greatest Secret of the Cold War (London: HarperCollins, 1999), pp. 330
^14 Victor Navasky, "Cold War Ghosts" The Nation, 16 July 2001
