= Perlo group =

American spies

Headed by Victor Perlo, the Perlo group was a group of Americans who provided information which was given to Soviet intelligence agencies; it was active during the World War II period, until the entire group was exposed to the FBI by the defection of Elizabeth Bentley.

It had sources on the War Production Board, the Senate La Follette Subcommittee on Civil Liberties, and in the United States Department of Treasury.

== Evidence ==
=== Account of Elizabeth Bentley ===
On July 31, 1948, Elizabeth Bentley testified before the House Un-American Activities Committee (HUAC):

MISS BENTLEY: I had one other group that I handled, and I had every reason to believe there were other groups also.
MR. STRIPLING: What was the other group that you handled?
MISS BENTLEY: We called it the Perlo group. It was actually an ex-Communist Party unit that I believe had been set up in Washington in the early thirties, and I gather, from what the members of the group told me, that they had been in a minor way collecting information for some years but not in an organized fashion.

Much useful additional information on the activities of the Perlo group was given by the Venona project. The first Venona transcript referencing the Perlo group gives the names of all the members in clear text, as code names had not yet been assigned.

Bentley advised that Jacob Golos informed her he had made contact with a group in Washington, D.C. through Earl Browder. After the death of Golos in 1943, two meetings were arranged with this group in 1944. The first meeting was arranged by Browder and was held in early 1944. The meetings were held in the apartment of John Abt in New York City and Bentley was introduced to four individuals identified as Victor Perlo, Charles Kramer, Harry Magdoff and Edward Fitzgerald.

=== Account of Whittaker Chambers ===
On August 3, 1948, Whittaker Chambers testified before HUAC:

MR. CHAMBERS: The apparatus was organized with a leading group of seven men, each of whom was a leader of the cell.
MR. STRIPLING: Could you name the seven individuals ?
MR. CHAMBERS: The head of the group as I have said was at first Nathan Witt. Other members of the group were Lee Pressman, Alger Hiss, Donald Hiss, Victor Perlo, Charles Kramer...
MR. STRIPLING: When Miss Bentley testified before the committee last Saturday, Mr. Chambers, she mentioned the name of Victor Perlo as being the head of an espionage group. You have named Victor Perlo as a member of the apparatus.
MR. CHAMBERS: Yes.
MR. STRIPLING: At that time do you know whether or not Victor Perlo was employed in the Government?
MR. CHAMBERS: I believe at that time Victor Perlo was employed by the Brookings Institution.
MR. MUNDT: I think we read his employment record into the record of the hearing while Miss Bentley was testifying, did we not?
MR. STRIPLING: Yes, Mr. Chairman. I have his employment history here. It is already in the record.
MR. MUNDT: He was employed with the Government several times?
MR. STRIPLING: That is true, and was with the Brookings Institution, also.

In his memoir (1952), Chambers recalled:

A crisis, he (J. Peters) said, had developed in the (Harold Ware) Group (following Ware's accidental death). Victor Perlo believed that he should succeed Ware as Group leader. He was being stubborn and surly about it. All the other members of the leadership believed that Nathan Witt was Ware's natural heir. A deadlock had resulted, for, though the rest might easily have outvoted Perlo, they did not wish to risk trouble in the Group by alienating him. Peters was also for Witt. So was I. But Peters did not wish to use his authority to act against any member of the Group in favor of another member. Peters asked me if I would come in and, since my personal authority was high with the Group, give my reasons why I was for Witt.
I went in. I said that we must first of all treat the problem that had arisen as Communists, without personalities, and bearing in mind the peculiar nature of underground work and its unusual requirements, especially in the personal character of leadership. I asked Perlo's pardon for observing that he was a tense and nervous man, and that his very belief in his own qualifications for leadership, while perhaps quite justified, would actually be a handicap so long as it was not shared by the rest of the Group. Of course, we Communists did not believe in any mystical rightness of majorities over minorities, but we did believe in practical solutions to practical problems. Witt was acknowledged to be quiet, firm and solid. He had the confidence of all the members of the Group except Perlo. Therefore, I was for Witt.
Perlo, of course, was unconvinced, but he agreed to abide by discipline. Thereafter, he would scarcely speak to me. Later, according to Elizabeth Bentley, he rose to the leadership he coveted in her espionage group.

=== Account in Venona ===
The Perlo group fits into the Venona project information when transcript # 687 of 13 May 1944 is examined. Iskhak Akhmerov in New York City personally prepared a report to MGB headquarters in Moscow advising that some unspecified action had been taken regarding Elizabeth Bentley in accordance with instructions of Earl Browder. Akhmerov then made reference to winter and also to Harry Magdoff. This latter reference was then followed by a statement that in Bentley's opinion "they" are reliable. It was also mentioned that no one had interested himself in their possibilities.

The name Golovin was mentioned, and it was then reported that Victor Perlo, Charles Kramer, Edward Fitzgerald and Harry Magdoff would take turns coming to New York every two weeks. Akhmerov said Kramer and Fitzgerald knew Nathan Gregory Silvermaster, whose cover name was later changed to "Robert".

=== Records in KGB Archives ===
Allen Weinstein and Alexander Vassiliev in Haunted Wood, a book written from an examination of KGB Archives in Moscow, report the KGB credits the Perlo group members with having sent, among other items, the following 1945 U.S. Government documents to Moscow:

February

- Contents of a WPB memo dealing with apportionment of aircraft to the USSR in the event of war on Japan;
- WPB discussion of the production policy regarding war materials at an Executive Committee meeting;
- Documents on future territorial planning for commodities in short supply;
- Documents on a priority system for foreign orders for producing goods in the United States after the end of the war in Europe;
- Documents on trade policy and trade controls after the war;
- Documents on arms production in the United States in January 1945;

March

- A WPB report on "Aluminum for the USSR and current political issues in the U.S. over aluminum supplies" (2/26/45);

April

- Documents concerning the committee developing plans for the U.S. economy after the defeat of Germany, and also regarding war orders for the war against Japan;
- Documents on the production of the B-29 bomber and the B-32;
- Tactical characteristics of various bombers and fighters;
- Materials on the United States using Saudi Arabian oil resources;

June

- Data concerning U.S. war industrial production in May from the WPB's secret report;
- Data concerning plans for a 1945–1946 aircraft production from the WPB;
- More data on specific aircraft's technical aspects;

August

- Data concerning the new Export-Import Bank;
- Data concerning supplies of American aircraft to the Allies in June 1945;
- Data from the top secret WPB report on U.S. war industry production in June;

October

- Detailed data concerning the industrial capacities of the Western occupation zones of Germany that could be brought out as war reparations;
- Information on views within the U.S. Army circles concerning the inevitability of war against the USSR as well as statements by an air force general supporting U.S. acquisition of advanced bases in Europe for building missiles.

== Members ==
Victor Perlo headed the Perlo group. Perlo was originally allegedly a member of the Ware group before World War II. After receiving a master's degree in mathematics from Columbia University in 1933, Perlo worked at a number of New Deal government agencies among a group of economists known as "Harry Hopkins' bright young men." The group worked, among other things, for creation and implementation of the WPA jobs program, and helped push through unemployment compensation, the Wagner National Labor Relations Act, the Fair Labor Standards Act, and Social Security. During World War II, Perlo served in several capacities, working first as chief of the Aviation Section of the War Production Board, then in the Office of Price Administration, and later for the Treasury Department. Perlo left the government in 1947. Perlo also worked for the Brookings Institution and wrote American Imperialism. Perlo's code name in Soviet intelligence was "Eck" and "Raid" appearing in Venona project as "Raider".

- Victor Perlo, Chief of the Aviation Section of the War Production Board; head of branch in Research Section, Office of Price Administration Department of Commerce; Division of Monetary Research Department of Treasury; Brookings Institution
- Edward Fitzgerald, War Production Board
- Harold Glasser, Deputy Director, Division of Monetary Research, United States Department of the Treasury; United Nations Relief and Rehabilitation Administration; War Production Board; Advisor on North African Affairs Committee; United States Treasury Representative to the Allied High Commission in Italy
- Charles Kramer, Senate Subcommittee on War Mobilization; Office of Price Administration; National Labor Relations Board; Senate Subcommittee on Wartime Health and Education; Agricultural Adjustment Administration; Senate Subcommittee on Civil Liberties; Senate Labor and Public Welfare Committee; Democratic National Committee
- Harry Magdoff, Statistical Division of War Production Board and Office of Emergency Management; Bureau of Research and Statistics, WTB; Tools Division, War Production Board; Bureau of Foreign and Domestic Commerce, United States Department of Commerce
- Allen Rosenberg, Board of Economic Warfare; Chief of the Economic Institution Staff, Foreign Economic Administration; Senate Subcommittee on Civil Liberties; Senate Committee on Education and Labor; Railroad Retirement Board; Counsel to the Secretary of the National Labor Relations Board
- Donald Wheeler, Office of Strategic Services Research and Analysis division

== See also ==
- Harry Magdoff and espionage
- Whittaker Chambers and Alger Hiss
- Ware Group

== Sources ==
- Wikisource:Explanation and History of Venona Project Information
- FBI Venona file, Freedom of Information Act, FBI documents of historic interest concerning Venona (referenced in Senator Daniel P. Moynihan's book, Secrecy, ISBN 0-300-08079-4)
- Elizabeth Bentley reports on new KGB recruits from American Communist Party, Venona 588 New York to Moscow, 29 April 1944.
- KGB agent & Earl Browder instruct Bentley on new recruits, Venona 687 New York to Moscow, 13 May 1944.
- KGB NY Reports on new Agents from ACP working in US Govt, Venona 769, 771 KGB New York to Moscow, 30 May 1944.
- John Earl Haynes and Harvey Klehr, Venona: Decoding Soviet Espionage in America (Yale University Press, New Haven, 1999)
- Allen Weinstein and Alexander Vassiliev, The Haunted Wood: Soviet Espionage in America - The Stalin Era (New York: Random House, 1999).
