= John Yeackle =

American professional watercolorist (1940–2011)

John Frederick Yeackle
- Born: 1940; Birmingham, Alabama, US
- Died: 2011; Florida, US
- Education: Seminole High School
- Occupation: Artist
- Known for: Several watercolor paintings
- Notable work: Watercolor paintings of the wild turkey

John Frederick Yeackle (1940–2011) was an American professional watercolorist for over 30 years, and recognized as one of the Nation's top wildlife artists. Known primarily for his watercolor paintings of the American wild turkey. Born in 1940 in Birmingham, Alabama, John Yeackle died in 2011 in Florida. Yeackle's mentors were artists Winslow Homer, William Russell Flint, and Edward J. Fitzgerald.

== Early life ==
John Yeackle lived the first decade of his life in the Birmingham, Alabama area. In 1950, Yeackle's family moved to Sanford, Florida, where they developed Seminole Fish Camp, on the Wekiva River. John Yeackle spent much of his life near the Wekiva River in central Florida, and it was the subject of many of his watercolor paintings . It was in that region where John Yeackle developed a love of Nature and the wilderness environment, which combined with his Dutch, German and Native Americans heritage.

In 1958, John Yeackle graduated from Seminole High School, and then attended Southern Union State Community College in Wadley, Alabama. In 1962, he graduated from Troy State University, then was employed as a microbiologist for the State of Alabama until 1973. Afterwards, John Yeackle and his family moved to Longwood, Florida, where he then became a full-time artist at age 33.

== Art career ==
National & International Artwork

Ducks Unlimited, National Wild Turkey Federation, Quail Unlimited, Safari Club International, and The Nature Conservancy have used John Yeackle's sporting and wildlife scenes to represent their various wildlife and conservation efforts.

Publications that featured John Yeackle's artwork:

US Art, Sporting Classics, Gray's Sporting Journal, Waterfowl & Wetlands, Wildlife Art News, Florida Wildlife, Florida Audubon, and the American Veterinarian Medical Association Journal.

Exhibitions & Shows that featured John Yeackle's artwork:

Southeastern Wildlife Exposition, Waterfowl Festival, Ward Foundation National Wildlife Art Show, Oklahoma Wildlife Arts, Florida Wildlife Exposition, and many others.

Art Galleries that featured John Yeackle's artwork:

McBride Gallery in Annapolis, Maryland, Ocmulgee Arts in Macon, Georgia, Country Pride in Franklin, North Carolina, Fast Frame in Auburn, Alabama, Fredlund Gallery in Winter Park, Florida, and Mosquito Creek Outdoors in Apopka, Florida.
