= Walter Granville-Smith =

American painter

- Born: January 28, 1870; South Granville, New York
- Died: December 7, 1938 (aged 68); Jackson Heights, Queens, New York
- Education: Art Students League of New York
- Known for: Illustration and Painting

Walter Granville-Smith (1870–1938) was an American illustrator and painter who produced the first colored illustration that appeared in the United States.

== Early life and education ==
Walter Granville-Smith was born in South Granville, New York on January 28, 1870. Granville-Smith attended the Newark Academy in Newark, New Jersey. He received his first instruction in painting from David McClure and as a teenager he studied under Walter Satterlee. He then studied at the Art Students League of New York under Willard Metcalf and James Carroll Beckwith.

== Career ==
Granville-Smith started his career as a magazine illustrator. His illustrations appeared in Harper’s Magazine, Century Illustrated Monthly Magazine, Metropolitan Magazine, and Collier's. He was noted for his pioneering work in color. As an illustrator, he produced the first colored illustration to appear in the United States, for Gertrude Atherton’s A Christmas Witch, in the January 1893 issue of Godey’s Lady’s Book.

In 1897 Granville-Smith toured Europe, visiting Holland, Belgium, and France. In Paris he studied at the Academie Julien. After 1900 Granville-Smith focused on landscape painting. He acquired a summer home in Bellport, New York in 1908, and this area became a frequent subject of his landscape and seascape paintings. His New York Studio was located at 96 Fifth Avenue. Granville-Smith was a National Academician in 1915 with the National Academy of Design and served as president of the Salmagundi Club in New York from 1924 to 1926.

His works are part of the permanent collections of the Smithsonian Institution (Grey Day), Butler Institute of American Art (The Willow), Toledo Museum of Art (South Haven Mill), the Currier Museum of Art (Truth), the Salmagundi Club, the Lotos Club, the Fencers Club of New York and the Art Club of Philadelphia. Many of his works can be seen at the Athenaeum website.

His work was part of the painting event in the art competition at the 1928 Summer Olympics.

== Personal life ==
Granville-Smith and his wife, Jessie, had a daughter Jesse, who became an editor and communist activist and two sons, Walter and Edward.

Walter Granville-Smith died on December 7, 1938, at his daughter's home in Jackson Heights, Queens, New York.

== Awards ==
Granville-Smith won numerous art awards, including

- Third Hallgarten prize, National Academy of Design, 1900
- Bronze medal, Charleston Expo., 1902
- Evans prize, American Watercolor Society, 1905
- First prize, Worcester Art Museum, 1906
- Hon. Mention, Carnegie Institute, Pittsburgh, 1907
- Inness gold medal, National Academy of Design, 1908
- Bronze medal, Buenos Aires Expo, 1910
- Vezin Prize, Salmagundi Club, 1911
- Shaw purchase prize, Salmagundi Club, 1913
- Hudnut prize, American Watercolor Society, 1916
- Isidor prize, Salmagundi Club, 1918
- Turnbull prize, 1922
- Auction Exhibition prize, 1925
- Carnegie prize, National Academy of Design, 1927
- Purchase prize, Salmagundi Club, 1928
- Second Altman prize, National Academy of Design, 1929
- First Altman prize, National Academy of Design, 1933

== Gallery ==
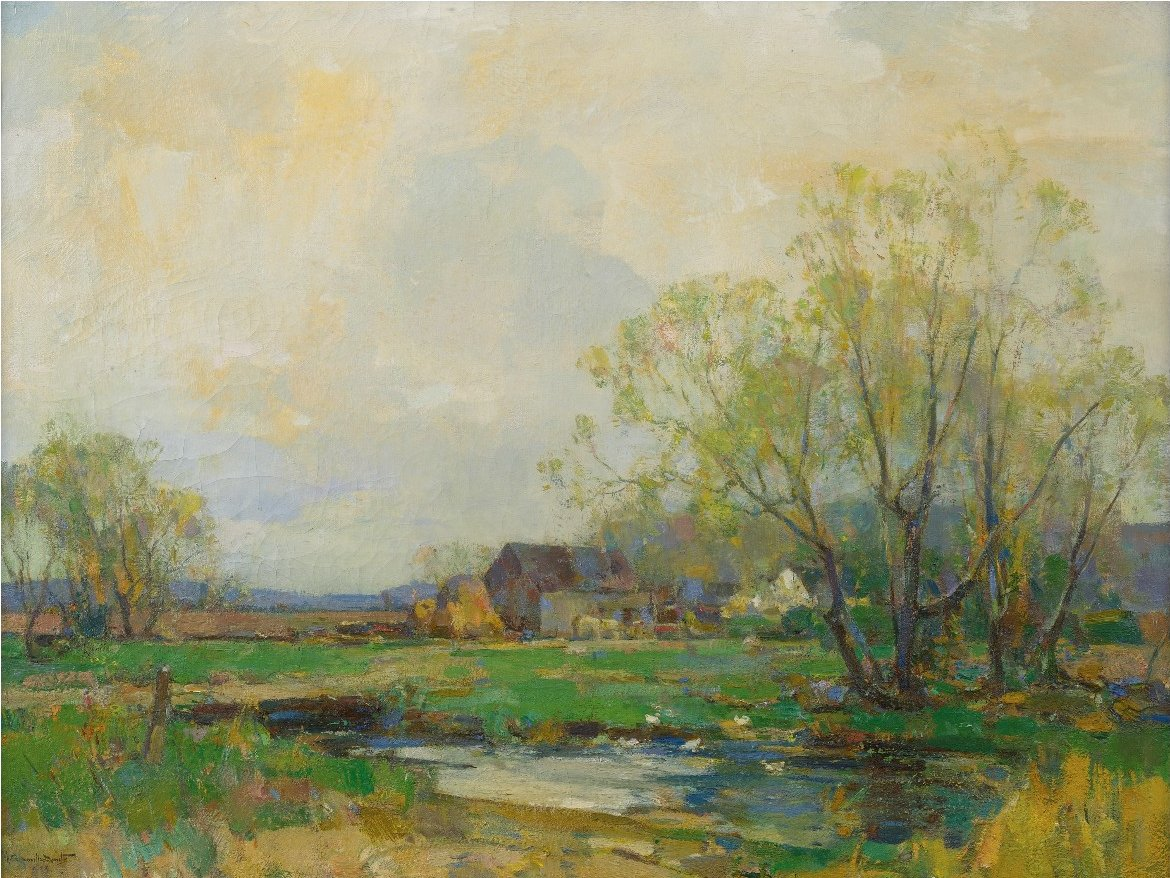
Spring Time by Walter Granville-Smith

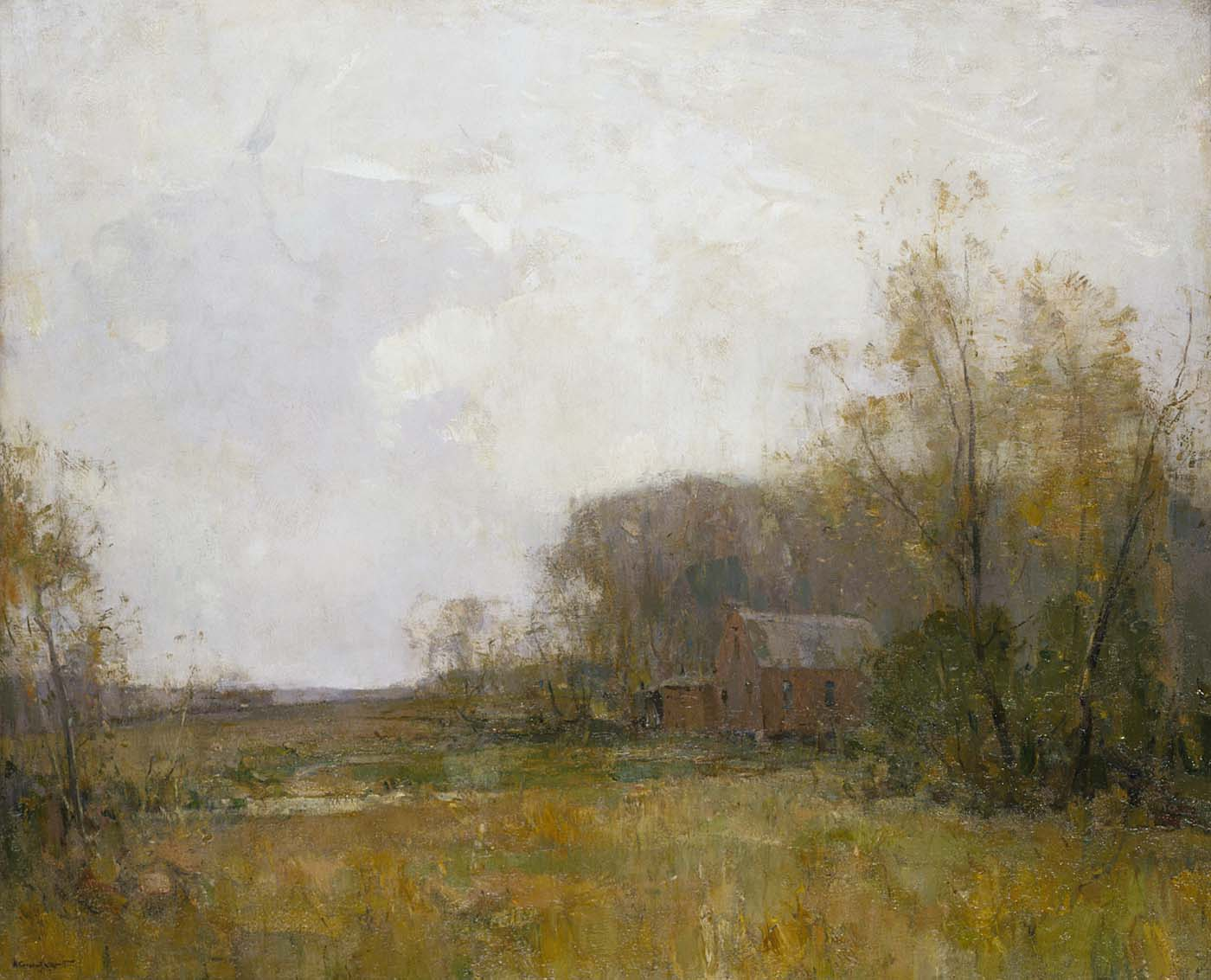
Walter Granville-Smith - Grey Day - 1920.4.4 - Smithsonian American Art Museum

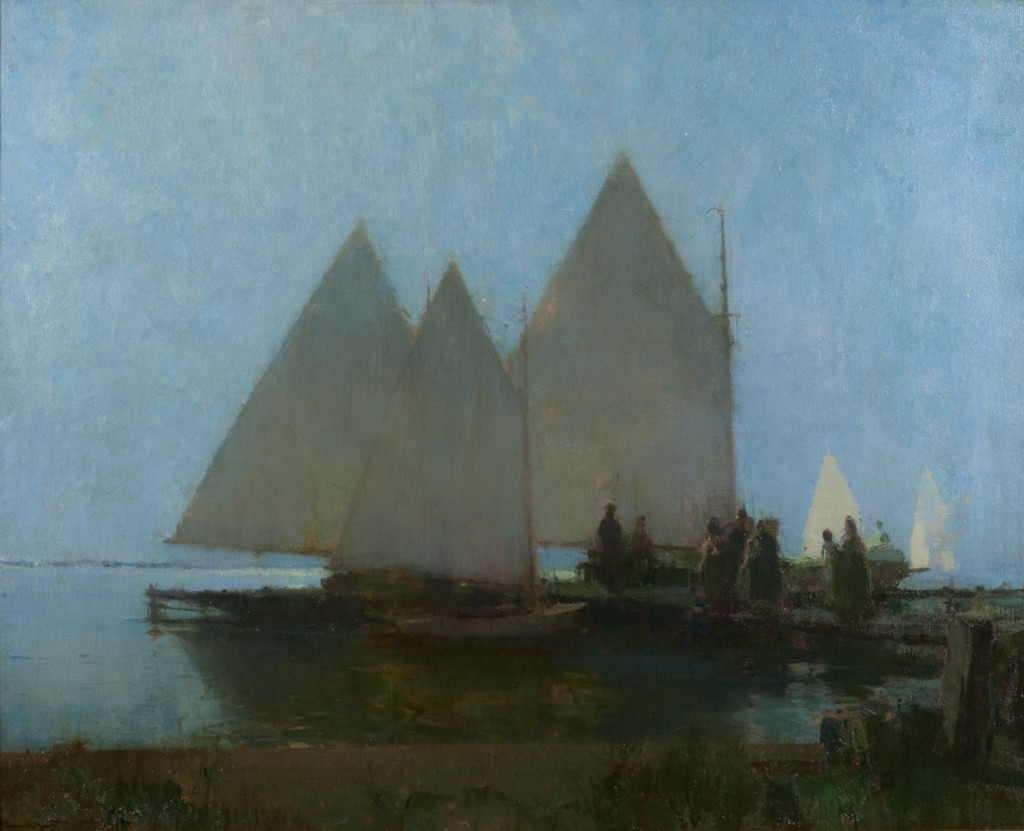
'Summer Night' by Walter Granville-Smith

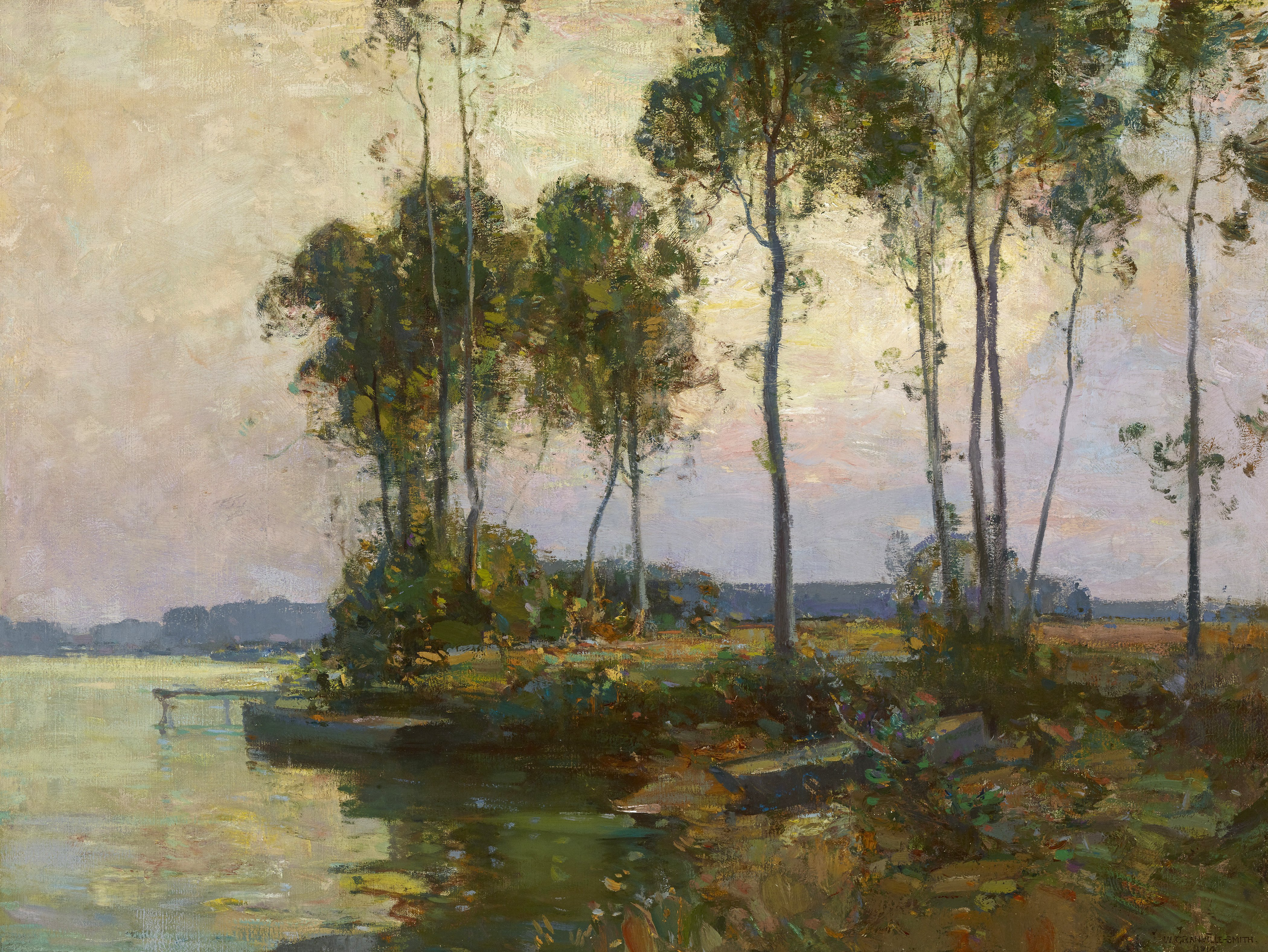
'Sentinel Trees', Bellport, Long Island by Walter Granville-Smith

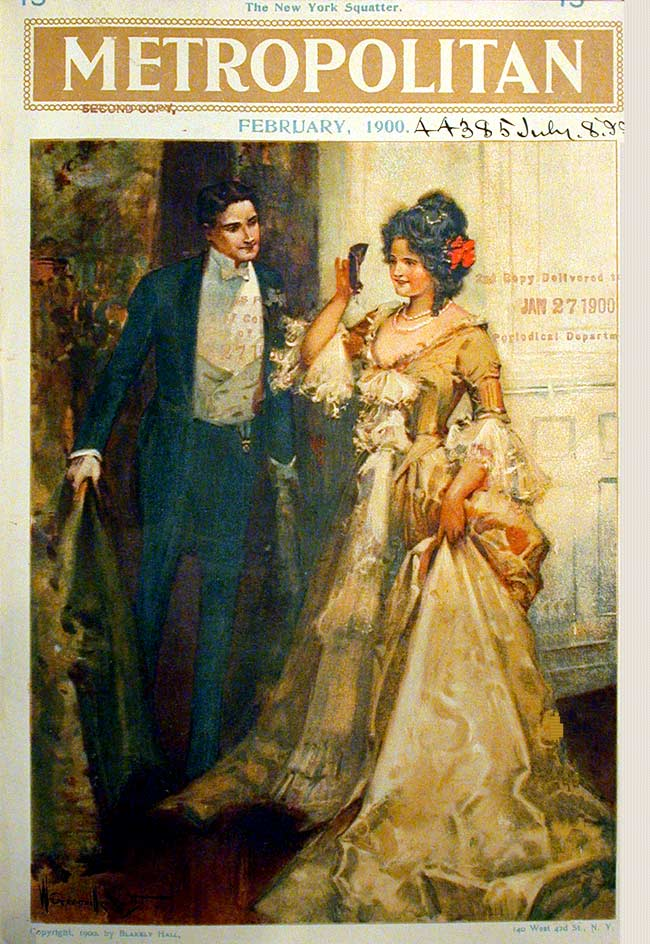
Metropolitan 1900-02
