= Jessica Smith (editor) =

American editor and activist (1895-1983)

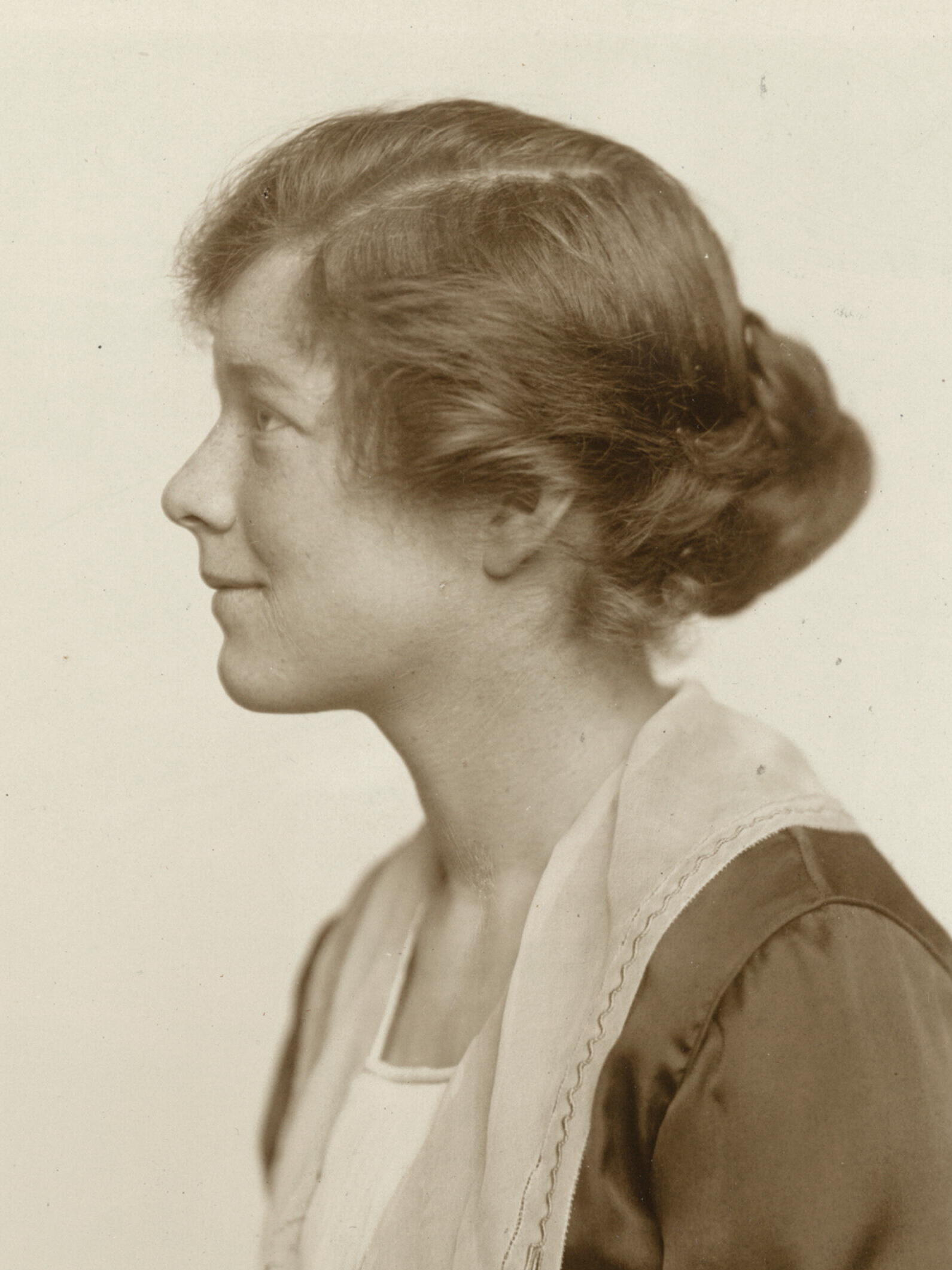
- Jessica Smith ca. 1913-1918
- Born: Jessica Granville-Smith; November 29, 1895; Madison, New Jersey, United States
- Died: October 17, 1983 (aged 87); United States
- Occupations: Editor, activist
- Spouse(s): Harold Ware (m. 1925; died 1935) John Abt (m. 1937)
- Awards: Order of Friendship of Peoples

Jessica Smith (November 29, 1895 – October 17, 1983) was an American editor and activist. She was married to Harold Ware and subsequently John Abt, both members of the Ware Group run by Whittaker Chambers and whose members also included Alger Hiss.

== Background ==
Jessica Granville-Smith was born on November 29, 1895, in Madison, New Jersey, the daughter of painter Walter Granville-Smith of New York City, Jessica Granville-Smith (as she was known in her early life), graduated from Swarthmore College.

== Career ==
In 1922, she traveled to the Soviet Union with a Quaker Mission on behalf of a Quaker famine relief effort, the American Friends Service Committee. She was a relief worker there herself. She wrote articles on the humanitarian crisis and kept up correspondence with friends back in America during this time, including Beulah Hurley Waring.

In Moscow she met Harold Ware, an agricultural expert and socialist. They tried to establish a model collective farm in the Ural Mountains using American tractors. They returned New York by January 1925.

Ware returned to Moscow for a time, while Smith remained in the United States to become editor of Soviet Russia Today, a publication of the organization Friends of Soviet Russia. She held the position for more than twenty years. Her editorial board included American communist writer Myra Page.

In 1943, she became a co-founder of National Council of American-Soviet Friendship, where she also served as vice president and a member of its national advisory council.

Later, she served as editor of the New World Review for some years.

== Ware Group ==
Hal Ware founded the Ware Group in the early 1930s and held the first meeting late in 1933.

In September 1939, Whittaker Chambers mentioned Smith in connection with Abt to Adolf Berle.

== Personal life and death ==
While in Moscow in the early 1920s, Smith met Harold Ware, an agricultural expert and socialist. In 1925, they were married in New York by Norman Thomas. They had one child, David Ware. In 1935, Ware died in an automobile accident.

In 1937, Smith married John Abt, a member of the Ware Group.

Smith died in 1983; Abt died in 1991.

She had a "deep commitment to American-Soviet friendship... continuously demonstrated by staunch support of the program of the National Council." She "dedicated her long life to US-USSR friendship and peace."

She also championed women's suffrage.

== Works ==
Smith worked on many books and article in her life.

Books written or co-written:

- Woman in Soviet Russia (1928)
- Over the North Pole by Georgiĭ Baĭdukov and Jessica Smith (1938)
- People Come First (1948)
- Jungle Law or Human Reason? The North Atlantic Pact and What It Means to You (1949)
- The American People Want Peace: A Survey of Public Opinion (New York: SRT Publications, 1955)
- Hungary in Travail (1956)
- Soviet Democracy, and How It Works (New York: National Council of American-Soviet Friendship, 1969)
- Building a New Society : The 25th Congress of the Communist Party of the Soviet Union (1976)

Books edited or co-edited:

- War and Peace in Finland: A Documented Survey, edited by Alter Brody, Theodore M. Bayer, Isidor Schneider, Jessica Smith (New York : Soviet Russia Today, 1940)
- The U.S.S.R. and World Peace, edited by Jessica Smith (1949)
- Lenin's Impact on the United States, edited by Daniel Mason, Jessica Smith, David Laibman (1970)
- Voices of Tomorrow: The 24th Congress of the Communist Party of the Soviet Union, edited by Jessica Smith (New York, NWR Publications, 1971)

== See also ==
- English-language press of the Communist Party USA
- Harold Ware
- John Abt
- Ware Group
