= Edward Fitzgerald (adviser) =

American spy

Edward Joseph Fitzgerald was an American who worked for the War Production Board during World War II and was an adviser to Senator Claude Pepper. He was alleged to have been a member of the Perlo group of Soviet spies. Fitzgerald's name in Venona project decrypt 588 New York to Moscow, 29 April 1944, was sent in the clear to Moscow by Soviet Case Officer Iskhak Akhmerov reporting on Elizabeth Bentley's meeting with Perlo group.

== Venona ==
The decryption reads, in part,

KRAMER[KREJMER][x], PERLO[PRLO][xi], FLATO[FLĒTO][xii], GLASSER[GLAZER][xiii], Edward FITZGERALD[EDUARD FITsDZhERALD][xiv] and others in a group of 7 or 8 FELLOW COUNTRYMENT[ZEMLYaki][xi][c].

UMNITsA talked with AMT and PERLO. They told her that this group was neglected and that nobody was interested in them. KRAMER is the leader of the group. All occupy responsible posts in CARTHAGE[KARFAGEN][xvi].

Elizabeth Bentley, who functioned as the Perlo group's main contact with the Soviet intelligence, told the FBI after her defection, "I would state that Victor Perlo represented this group in meetings with me more often than other members of the group, Fitzgerald about four or five times...".

After World War II, Fitzgerald resigned from his position with the U.S. Department of Commerce. In 1954, Fitzgerald was offered immunity from prosecution, which removed the legal grounds to plead the Fifth Amendment. Fitzgerald nonetheless still refused to testify and went to jail.

His alleged code name in Soviet intelligence and in the Venona files is "Ted".

== Venona decryptions ==
Edward Fitzgerald is referenced in the following Venona project decryptions:

- Elizabeth Bentley reports on new KGB recruits from American Communist Party, Venona 588 New York to Moscow, 29 April 1944.
- KGB agent & Earl Browder instruct Bentley on new recruits, Venona 687 New York to Moscow, 13 May 1944.
- KGB NY Reports on new Agents from ACP working in US Govt, Venona 769, 771 KGB New York to Moscow, 30 May 1944.
- ALBERT's network & material photos. Silvermasters network widely known, Venona 179, 180 KGB Moscow to New York, 25 February 1945.
