= Marion Bachrach =

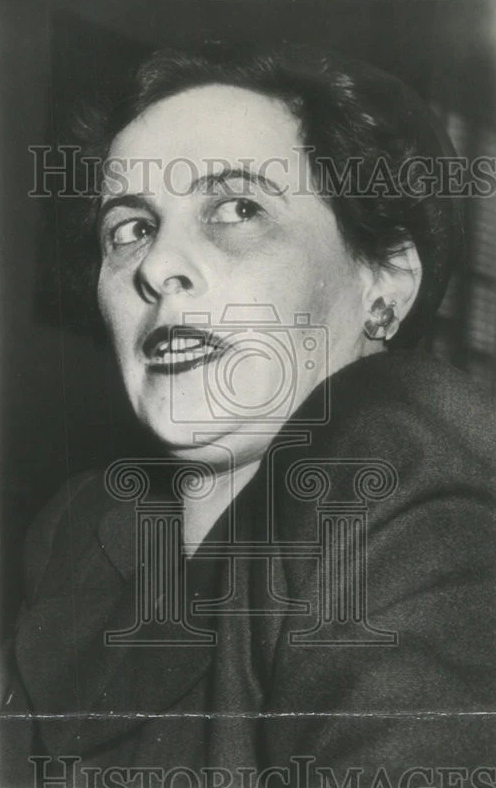
Bachrach in 1948

Marion Bachrach (née Abt; 1898–1957) was a member of the Ware group, a group of government employees in the New Deal administration of President Franklin D. Roosevelt who were also members of the secret apparatus of the Communist Party of the United States (CPUSA) in the 1930s. She was the sister of John Abt.

== Career ==
Bachrach was the personal secretary and congressional office manager to Representative John Bernard of the Minnesota Farmer-Labor Party in 1937-1938. He was a correspondent for the newspaper PM.

Membership and meeting of the Ware group were highly secretive, and many members eventually infiltrated into higher levels of the United States government during World War II. After Alger Hiss was cut out from closer contact with the Ware group, Hiss remained a close associate of Marion Bachrach. On November 20, 1942, Soviet foreign intelligence (Dimitrov to Fitin, RTsKhIDNI 495-74-484) requested a background report on Bachrach from the Comintern and received a positive report.

On December 14, 1948, Bachrach testified in Washington, DC, before the House Un-American Activities Committee (HUAC); the next day in New York City, a federal grand jury indicted Alger Hiss on two counts of perjury in relation to the same line of evidence that HUAC was investigating.

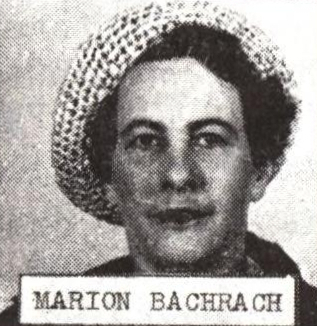
Bachrach's FBI mugshot, 1951

In 1951, Bachrach was arrested but got out on bail. Her attorney was Harold I. Cammer, whose law partners included Nathan Witt and formerly included Lee Pressman, also both members of the Ware Group. Cammer had represented Abt, Witt, and Pressman during the Hiss Case.

== Personal life ==
Marion Abt married Howard Bachrach, who worked at the Agricultural Adjustment Administration.

== Works ==
Bachrach wrote several tracts sold to Communist consumers. Some original publications appear to be quite profitable among collectors and sellers. Among them are Amnesty! Proposal of an amnesty program to release the members of the Communist Party imprisoned under the provisions of the Smith Act, This Obvious Violence, You Are on Trial and The Federal Grand Jury is Stacked Against You.

== See also ==
- John Abt
- Ware Group

== Sources ==
- Harvey Klehr, John Earl Haynes, and Fridrikh Igorevich Firsov, The Secret World of American Communism (New Haven: Yale University Press, 1995); ISBN 0-300-06855-7
- John Earl Haynes and Harvey Klehr, Venona: Decoding Soviet Espionage in America (New Haven: Yale University Press, 1999); ISBN 0-300-08462-5
- FBI Silvermaster File
