= John Abt =

American lawyer and politician (1904–1991)

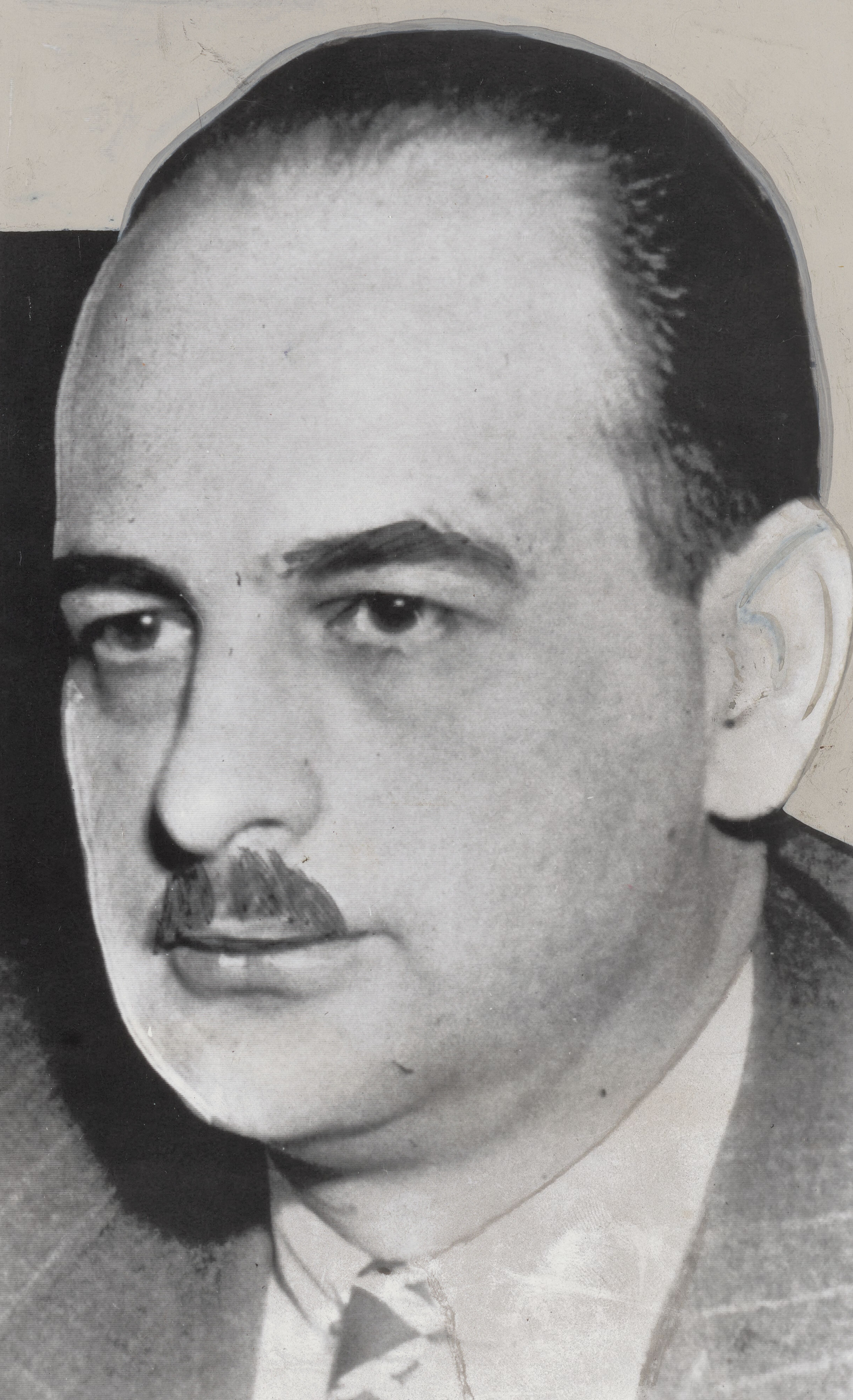
- Abt c. 1948
- Born: John Jacob Abt; May 1, 1904; Chicago, Illinois, U.S.
- Died: August 10, 1991 (aged 87); Hudson, New York, U.S.
- Other name: "Amt" (VENONA)
- Employer(s): AAA, La Follette Committee, United States Attorney General's office, CIO
- Known for: Membership in Ware Group, Perlo Group, IJA, NLG
- Notable work: CIO union collective bargaining
- Political party: Communist Party of the United States of America, American Labor Party, Progressive Party
- Spouses: Jessica Smith Ware (m. 1937; died 1983): Vita Barsky

John Jacob Abt (May 1, 1904 – August 10, 1991) was an American lawyer and politician, who spent most of his career as chief counsel to the Communist Party USA (CPUSA) and was a member of the Communist Party and the Soviet spy network "Ware Group" as alleged by Whittaker Chambers.

== Background ==
Abt was born on May 1, 1904, in Chicago, Illinois. His sister was Marion Bachrach. He was a graduate of the University of Chicago and its law school.

== Career ==
Abt practiced real estate and corporate law in Chicago from 1927 to 1933.

=== Government (1933–1938) ===
Abt was the Chief of Litigation, Agricultural Adjustment Administration from 1933 to 1935, assistant general counsel of the Works Progress Administration in 1935 (where Lee Pressman was also working), chief counsel to Senator Robert La Follette, Jr.'s Committee from 1936 to 1937 and special assistant to the United States Attorney General, 1937 and 1938.

=== Unions (1938–1948) ===
From 1938 to 1948, he worked at chief counsel of the Amalgamated Clothing Workers Union under Sidney Hillman, who hired him. By this time, the ACW had affiliated with the Congress of Industrial Organizations (CIO).

In his memoir, Abt claimed that leaders of the Communist Party of the USA had inspired the idea of the CIO-PAC:

In 1943, Gene Dennis came to me and Lee Pressman to first raise the idea of a political action committee to organize labor support for Roosevelt in the approaching 1944 election. Pressman approached Murray with the idea, as I did with Hillman. Both men seized upon the proposal with great enthusiasm.

Abt and Pressman became the CIO-PAC's co-counsels. (Thus, in 1943, as American spy Elizabeth Bentley resurrected the Ware Group [of which Abt had been a member], Abt could not risk involvement with her or the group. Instead, the group reformed without him under Victor Perlo as the Perlo Group.)

By January 1946, he was also working as general counsel for the Congress of Industrial Organizations (CIO) and traveled to Russia with a CIO delegation, which included Pressman. (The CIO had long-term support from communists; in 1947, CIO leaders like Walter Reuther pushed out communist elements and again in 1949 after the CIO's merger with the American Federation of Labor [AFL] to form the AFL-CIO.)

=== Politics (1946–1948) ===
In 1946, Abt appeared on the New York state ticket of American Labor Party candidates: Benjamin Fielding for Lieutenant Governor, Harry J. Chapman for State Controller, Joseph Lucchi for Attorney General, John T. Loughran for Chief Judge of the Court of Appeals, and John Abt for Associate Judge of the Court of Appeals. However, his name and those of two others were later withdrawn before the election in favor of the Democratic candidates.

In October 1946, he (as ACWA general counsel) joined other "liberal and progressive groups" in forming the new Progressive Party.

=== Progressive Party (1948) ===
In February 1948, Abt left the Amalgamated and Lee Pressman left the CIO to go work for the Progressive Party to support its presidential candidate, former Vice President Henry A. Wallace. At the time, the Washington Post dubbed Abt, Pressman, and Calvin Benham "Beanie" Baldwin (C. B. Baldwin) as "influential insiders" and "stage managers" in the Wallace campaign. He also supported the candidacy in New York of Vito Marcantonio, a leader of the American Labor Party.

=== CPUSA Counsel (1950–1970s) ===
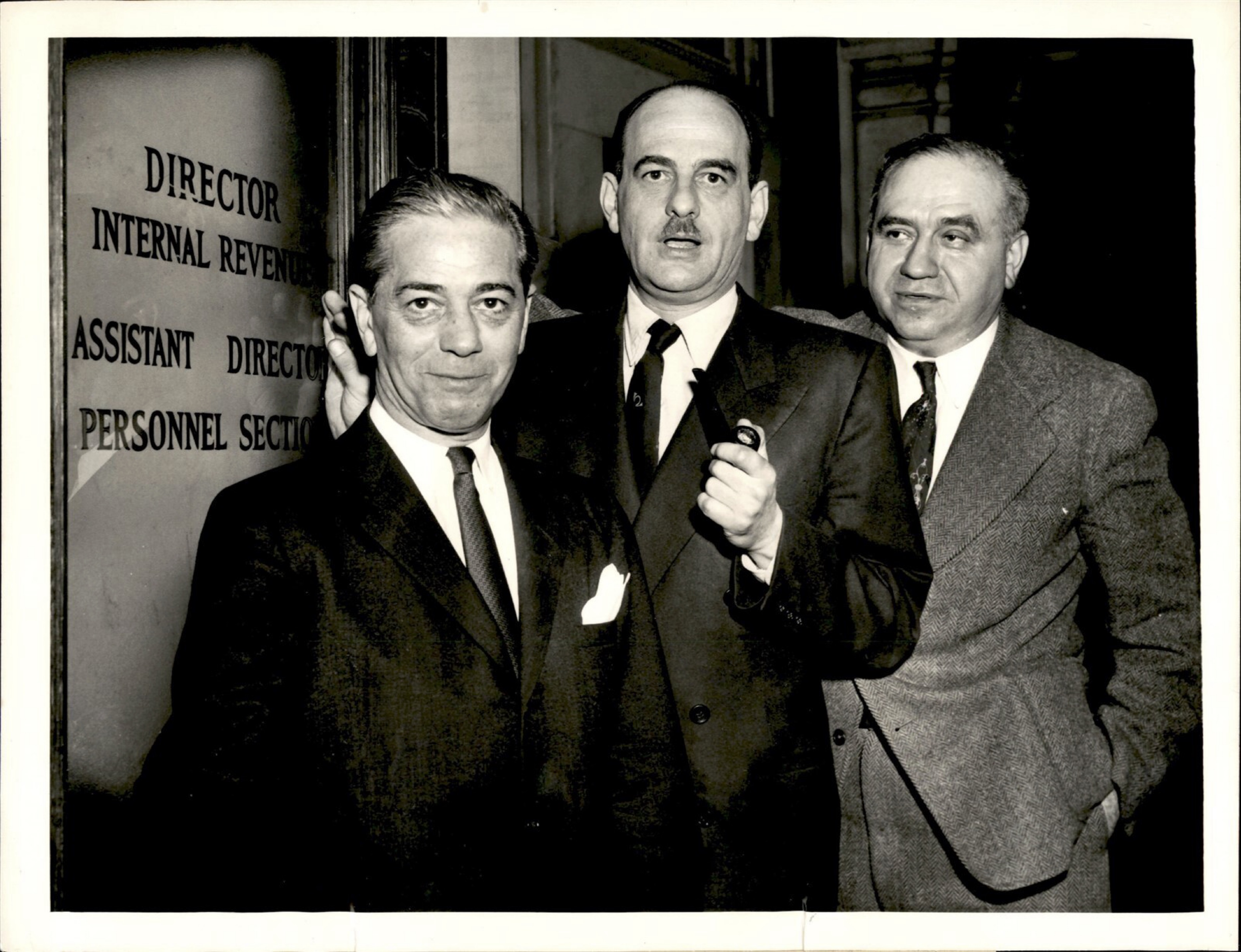
"Harry Sacher (left), and John Abt (center), attorneys for the Communist Party and the Daily Worker, are shown along with the paper's copy editor, Max Gordon, as they entered the office of the Director of Internal Revenue for Lower Manhattan." March 29, 1956

From 1951 to 1953, Abt joined Vito Marcantonio and Joseph Forer in defending the CPUSA on a charge from the McCarran Act.

In January 1955 Abt defended Claude Lightfoot in Chicago, an African-American Communist on trial under the 1940 Smith Act for belonging to a group that advocates the overthrow of the US government. This trial marked the first time the government attempted to convict an individual solely as a member of a group conspiring against the nation, rather than for individual actions. Although Abt's short and simple defense did not succeed at this trial, Lightfoot's conviction was ultimately overturned by the US Supreme Court in 1964.

In 1960, Abt again defended the CPUSA before the U.S. Supreme Court on the constitutionality of the McCarran Act. In 1961, however, the Court sustained the section of the act requiring Communist-action organizations to register with the Government by a vote of five to four.

During Lee Harvey Oswald's interrogation by the Dallas Police on the evening of 22 November 1963, pending his arraignment for the assassination of President John F. Kennedy, he requested the services of Mr. Abt:

I want that attorney in New York, Mr. Abt. I don't know him personally but I know about a case that he handled some years ago, where he represented the people who had violated the Smith Act, [which made it illegal to teach or advocate the violent overthrow of the U.S. government] ... I don't know him personally, but that is the attorney I want. ... If I can't get him, then I may get the American Civil Liberties Union to send me an attorney.

However, Abt and his wife had left New York City that day for a weekend at their cabin in Connecticut. He did not learn of Oswald's request until the following day. He told reporters that he had received no request either from Oswald or from anyone on his behalf to represent him, and so was in no position to give a definite answer. He said later that "if I were requested to represent him, I felt that it would probably be difficult, if not impossible, for me to do so because of my commitments to other clients."

In 1965, the Supreme Court ruled that individuals may invoke their constitutional privilege against self-incrimination and refuse to register with the Government as members of the US Communist Party. Abt considered this decision as his greatest legal victory.

Abt was one of the first attorneys to represent Angela Davis for her alleged involvement in the 1970 Marin County courthouse incident. Margaret Burnham worked with him and later wrote a foreword to his memoir.

== Espionage ==
=== Ware Group (1934–1944) ===
Abt was also a member of the Ware Group, a covert organization of Communist Party operatives within the United States government in the 1930s, which actively aided Soviet intelligence by passing on government information, as well as furnishing assistance to members of the CPUSA. Abt's sister, Marion Bachrach, was also a member of the group. After the group's founder, Harold Ware, was killed in an automobile collision in 1935, Abt married Jessica Smith, Ware's widow.

In late 1943, Jacob Golos, who headed the CPUSA's secret apparatus, was referred to a spy ring of party members by General Secretary of the party, Earl Browder. This ring had been engaged for some time in espionage for Browder, and held regular clandestine meetings at Abt's apartment. In early 1944, Golos sent Elizabeth Bentley to make contact with the group at Abt's apartment. In attendance was Abt, Victor Perlo, Charles Kramer, Harry Magdoff and Edward Fitzgerald. They discussed paying party dues to Bentley, the various types of information each would be able to deliver, and the type of information other members not in attendance would also be willing to deliver.

In late 1943, the Federal Bureau of Investigation opened an investigation of Abt. Its surveillance showed frequent meetings in the early months of 1944 between Abt and a man then known as Alexander Stevens, one of the several pseudonyms used by the shadowy J. Peters, a party 'enforcer' who at one time headed the CPUSA's secret apparatus, and was involved in clandestine Soviet intelligence activities in the U.S., until his deportation to Hungary in 1948.

=== Hiss Case (1948) ===
In 1948, under subpoena before HUAC, Whittaker Chambers named Abt among members of the Ware Group. Abt refused to give testimony.

(In 1996, it became known that Abt was referenced in Venona decrypts #588 KGB New York to Moscow, 29 April 1944 and #687 KGB New York to Moscow, 13 May 1944.)

=== Named by Pressman (1950) ===
Called again before Congress to give testimony on Communist Party activities, on August 28, 1950, Lee Pressman reversed his previous decision to exercise his Fifth Amendment rights and gave testimony against his former comrades. Pressman stated:

In my desire to see the destruction of Hitlerism and an improvement in economic conditions here at home, I joined a Communist group in Washington, D. C., about 1934. My participation in such group extended for about a year, to the best of my recollection. I recall that about the latter part of 1935— the precise date I cannot recall, but it is a matter of public record — I left the Government service and left Washington to reenter the private practice of law in New York City. And at that time I discontinued any further participation in the group from that date until the present.

He stated that he had no information about the political views of his former law school classmate Alger Hiss and specifically denied that Hiss was a participant in this Washington group. He indicated that in at least one meeting of his group, perhaps two, he had met Soviet intelligence agent J. Peters. Although he made no mention of having himself conducted intelligence-gathering activities, his 1950 testimony provided the first corroboration of Chambers' allegation that a Washington, DC communist group around Ware existed, with federal officials Nathan Witt, John Abt and Charles Kramer named as members of this party cell. TIME magazine mocked Pressman in its reportage in the issue following his hearing:

Like many another smart young man who followed the Communist line, sharp-eyed, sharply dressed Attorney Lee Pressman did very well for a long time. Har-vardman Pressman launched his leftward-turning career in Henry Wallace's AAA back in 1933, ended up as chief counsel of the CIO. He held the post for twelve years. But though he was a skilled labor lawyer, his fellow-traveling finally became too much for Phil Murray; 2½ years ago, Murray tearfully threw him out.
His star did not entirely wane. He became a power among the back-room Reds who steered Henry Wallace through the presidential campaign. But when the Korean war began, he, like Wallace, began slipping away from his Commie cronies. California's Congressman Richard Nixon, scenting opportunity, decided to call him before the House Un-American Activities Committee and ask him a few questions. (Once before, when Whittaker Chambers named Pressman as a member of the same elite apparatus as Alger Hiss, Pressman had taken refuge in the Fifth Amendment, refused to answer Congressmen's questions.)
Last week, Pressman decided to reverse his field...
This week ... he reluctantly consented to name three men who had been fellow Communists in the '30s—John Abt, Nathan Witt and Charles Kramer...

=== Lee Harvey Oswald (1963) ===
Abt was requested for legal assistance by Kennedy assassin Lee Harvey Oswald upon Oswald's arrests. An FBI document dated Nov 23, 1963, states that police captain Will Fritz confirmed that Oswald was sent a telegram from a Chicago attorney, but Fritz did not deliver it to Oswald as Oswald had expressly asked for Abt to defend him.

=== Angela Davis (1970) ===
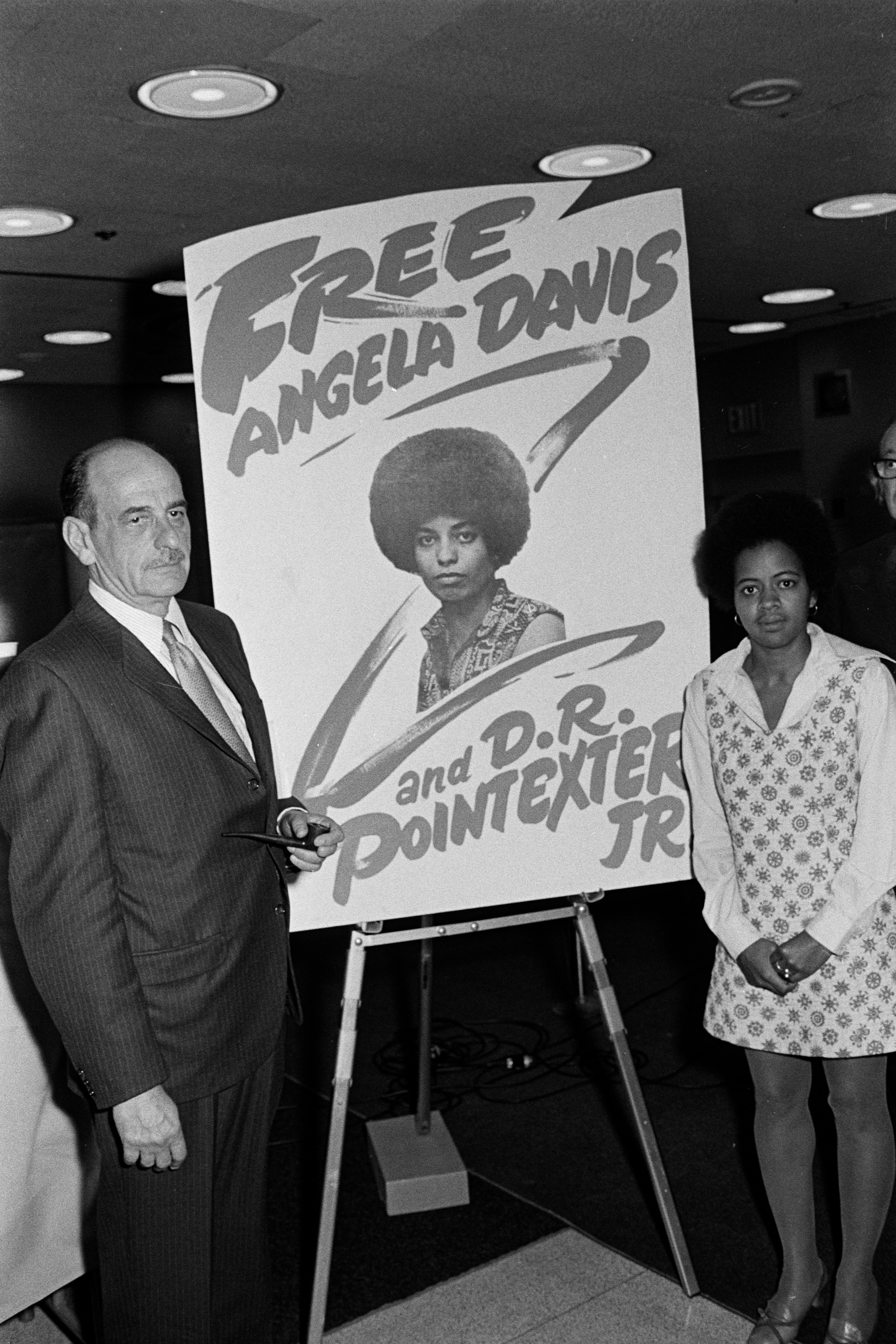
Abt and NAACP lawyer Margaret Burnham pose in front of a "Free Angela Davis" sign, October 16, 1970

In 1970, NAACP lawyer Margaret Burnham worked with Abt to defend Angela Davis, her friend since childhood, and later wrote the foreword to Abt's memoir.

=== Confession ===
In his memoir posthumously published in 1993, Abt revealed that the Ware Group was a Communist Party unit and that he had been a member.

== Personal life and death ==
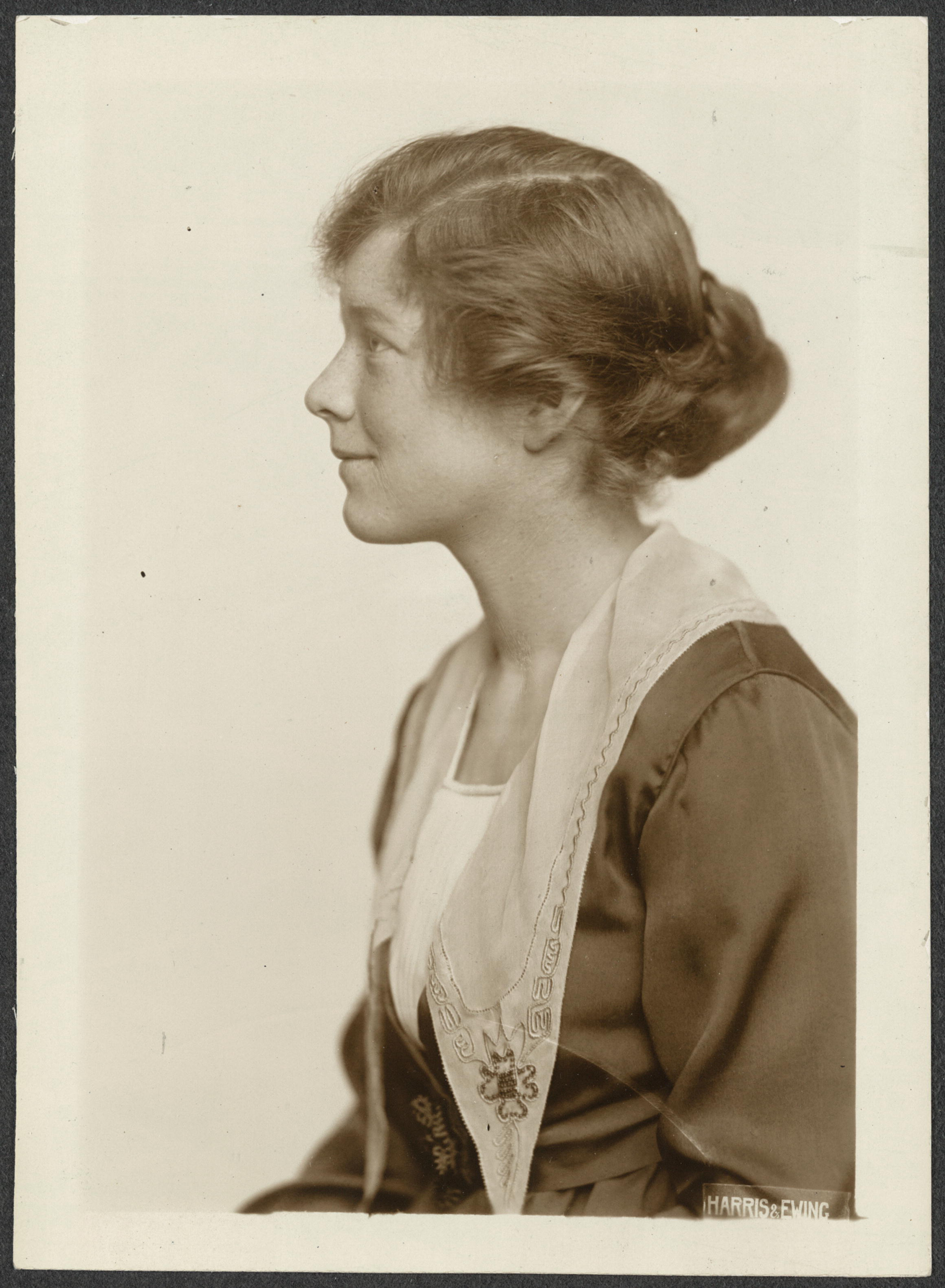
Abt's wife Jessica Smith c. 1913–1918

On March 14, 1937, Abt married editor and activist Jessica Smith Ware, widow of Harold Ware; she died in 1983.

Later, he married Vita Barsky.

In 1984, on his 80th birthday, Abt admitted to being a long-time member of the CPUSA.

On August 10, 1991, Abt died at the Columbia-Greene Medical Center in Hudson, New York from a stroke. He was 87.

== Works ==
Abt's memoir appeared in print in 1993, some two years after his death in 1991. In its review, the peer-reviewed Labor Studies Journal expressed doubt in many of Abt's major claims (e.g., "To hear John Abt tell about it, the chief counsel to the American Communist party knew virtually nothing about the inner workings of the party") and in fact "shed a dark light on Communist morality and class position."

- Advocate and Activist: Memoirs of an American Communist Lawyer (University of Illinois Press 1993).

== See also ==
- List of American spies
- Noel Field
- Harold Glasser
- John Herrmann
- Donald Hiss
- Ward Pigman
- Vincent Reno
- Julian Wadleigh
- Nathaniel Weyl
- Harry Dexter White
- Michael Myerson

== External sources ==
- Abt, John; Myerson, Michael (1993). Advocate and Activist: Memoirs of an American Communist Lawyer. Urbana, Illinois: University of Illinois Press. ISBN 9780252020308.
- Chambers, Whittaker (1952). Witness. New York: Random House. p. 799. LCCN 52005149.
- John Earl Haynes and Harvey Klehr, Venona: Decoding Soviet Espionage in America, Yale University Press, 1999. ISBN 0-300-08462-5.
- Allen Weinstein and Alexander Vassiliev, The Haunted Wood: Soviet Espionage in America – The Stalin Era (New York: Random House, 1999).
- New York FBI report, 9 April 1944, John Jacob Abt FBI file 100-236194, serial 6.
- The Warren Commission Report, Volume X – Testimony of John J. Abt
