= Charles Kramer (economist) =

American economist

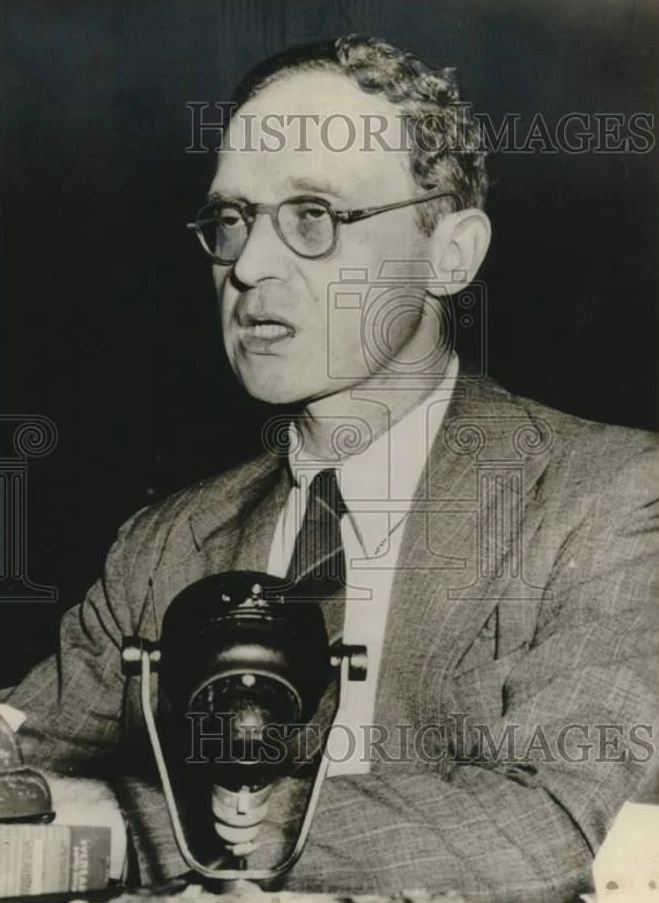
Kramer testifies before the House Un-American Activities Committee, August 13, 1948

Charles Kramer, originally Charles Krevisky (December 14, 1907 – September 27, 1992) was a 20th-Century American economist who worked for U.S. President Franklin D. Roosevelt as part of his brain trust. Among other contributions, he wrote the original idea for the Point Four Program. He also worked for several congressional committees and hired Lyndon B. Johnson for his first Federal job. Kramer was alleged a Soviet spy as member of the Ware Group, but no charges were brought against him.

== Biography ==
Kramer's family lost everything in the Depression as a result of his youngest brother's illness, and Kramer was forced to quit medical school and go to work. He was forced to take menial jobs such as farm labourer, sailor and stenographer.

Evidence of Kramer's membership in the Communist Party USA (CPUSA) and his contacts with known Soviet agents comes from several sources: the direct testimony of Whittaker Chambers, Elizabeth Bentley, Lee Pressman, and Nathaniel Weyl; the Venona decrypts; and the Moscow archives of the Soviet Foreign Intelligence Service (KGB).

Hope Hale Davis and her husband, Karl Hermann Brunck, were both members of the Communist Party of the United States (CPUSA). They were invited to the home of Charles Kramer, for their first meeting. Also in attendance were Victor Perlo and Marion Bachrach. Kramer explained that the CPUSA was organized in units. "Charles... explained that... we would try to limit our knowledge of other members, in case of interrogation, possible torture. Such an idea, he admitted, might seem rather remote in the radical Washington climate, but climates could change fast. In most places members of units knew each other only by their Party pseudonyms, so as not to be able to give real names if questioned."

Other alleged members of the CPUSA underground allegedly assisted Kramer in obtaining some of his positions in the American government. John Abt hired him for the Senate Civil Liberties Subcommittee (the La Follette Committee). Nathan Witt helped him get a job within the Department of Labor National Labor Relations Board (NLRB) before World War II. Victor Perlo signed Kramer's job performance rating at the Office of Price Administration (OPA) during the war and was listed as a job reference.

Allen Weinstein has alleged out that Kramer was the head of a Soviet spy network (codename Mole later changed to Lot). His wife, Mildred Kramer, was a NKVD courier.

According to the Soviet archives Charles Kramer was instructed to try and recruit Robert Oppenheimer as a spy. Kramer's report sent to Anatoly Gorsky on 19 October 1945, shows that Oppenheimer refused to pass on information from the Manhattan Project. Kramer described Oppenheimer as a "liberal" and not a "covert Communist".

Kramer took time off in 1944 to work for the Democratic National Committee and in 1946 to assist the reelection campaign of California Democratic representative Ellis Patterson, and he also worked for the United States Senate Subcommittee on War Mobilization (the Kilgore Committee ) and the Senate Subcommittee on Wartime Health and Education during the war; and the Senate Labor and Public Welfare Committee after the war.

Kramer is supposed to have provided information to the Soviets from his position as staff member of the Senate Subcommittee on War Mobilization on a dispute among American policy makers concerning the French National Committee of Charles de Gaulle and an internal U.S. government investigation of German corporate links to American companies. Kramer also allegedly passed information from the Democratic National Committee about President Harry S. Truman's likely appointments in the State Department and views of Truman by various Senators.

The Venona decrypts from 1945 suggest that Kramer was an unwilling source. His contacts with Anatoli Gorsky, the legal Rezident, provided little information beyond what could be obtained from a newspaper article or overheard at a Washington D.C. restaurant.

== Venona ==
Kramer is referred to in Soviet intelligence intercepts and the Venona files as "Plumb", "Lot" and "Mole".

== Bibliography ==
- Chambers, Whittaker (1952). Witness. Random House. pp. 344–346, 552–554 and others. ISBN 0-89526-571-0.
- Haynes, John Earl, and Harvey Klehr, Venona: Decoding Soviet Espionage in America, Yale University Press
- Klehr, Harvey, The Heyday of American Communism: The Depression Decade (New York: Basic Books, 1984), 271–272, 403
- Kramer, Charles, testimony of 6 May 1953, “Interlocking Subversion in Government Departments,” Subcommittee to Investigate the Administration of the Internal Security Act and Other Internal Security Laws, U.S. Senate Committee on the Judiciary, 83d Cong., 1st sess., part 6, 327–381
- Weinstein, Allen, and Alexander Vassiliev, The Haunted Wood: Soviet Espionage in America—The Stalin Era, New York: Random House, (1999)

== See also ==
- Venona
- Ware Group
- Whittaker Chambers
- Alger Hiss
- Lee Pressman
- John Abt
- Elizabeth Bentley
- Alice Barrows
- Hope Hale Davis
