= Nathan Witt =

American lawyer (1903–1982)

Nathan R. Witt
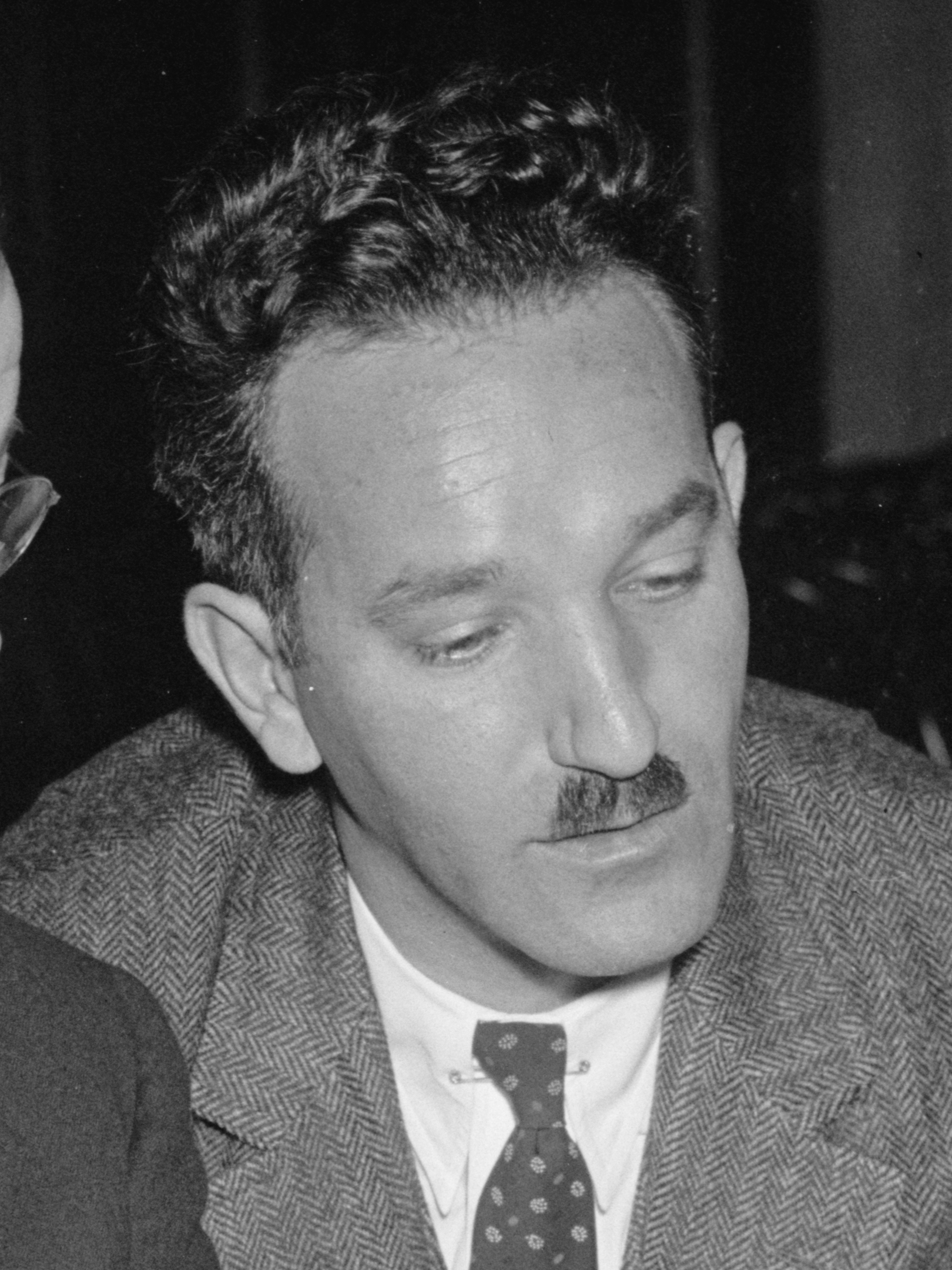
- Witt in 1937
- Born: Nathan Wittowsky; February 11, 1903; New York City, U.S.
- Died: February 16, 1982 (aged 79); New York City, U.S.
- Education: New York University (1927)
- Alma mater: Harvard Law School (1933)
- Occupation: Lawyer
- Years active: 1933-1975
- Employer(s): AAA, NLRB, Witt & Cammer, Pressman Witt & Cammer, Mine-Mill, USWA
- Known for: membership in Ware Group, IJA, NLG
- Notable work: NLRB collective bargaining
- Political party: Communist Party of the United States of America, Progressive Party
- Spouse: Anna Laura Phillips
- Children: 2

Nathan Witt (February 11, 1903 – February 16, 1982), born Nathan Wittowsky, was an American lawyer who is best known as being the Secretary of the National Labor Relations Board (NLRB) from 1937 to 1940. He resigned from the NLRB after his communist political beliefs were exposed, and he was accused of manipulating the Board's policies to favor his own political leanings. He was also investigated several times in the late 1940s and 1950s for being a spy for the Soviet Union in the 1930s. No evidence of espionage was ever found.

== Background ==
Nathan R. Witt was born February 11, 1903, into a Jewish family on the Lower East Side of New York City. His father changed the family name to Witt shortly after his birth. His college education was interrupted several times by the need to earn a living: he drove a taxi cab. In 1927, he graduated from New York University (NYU). It was at NYU's Washington Square College that he met Lee Pressman.

Angered by what he perceived as the judicial mistreatment and illegal execution of the anarchists Sacco and Vanzetti in 1927, he drove a taxi cab for two years to earn money for law school. He graduated from Harvard Law School in 1932, or 1933, specializing in labor law. He attended Harvard shortly after Alger Hiss had left the school, and he was a friend of Donald Hiss, a Harvard Law classmate and Alger Hiss's younger brother.

== Career ==
=== Agricultural Adjustment Administration (AAA) ===
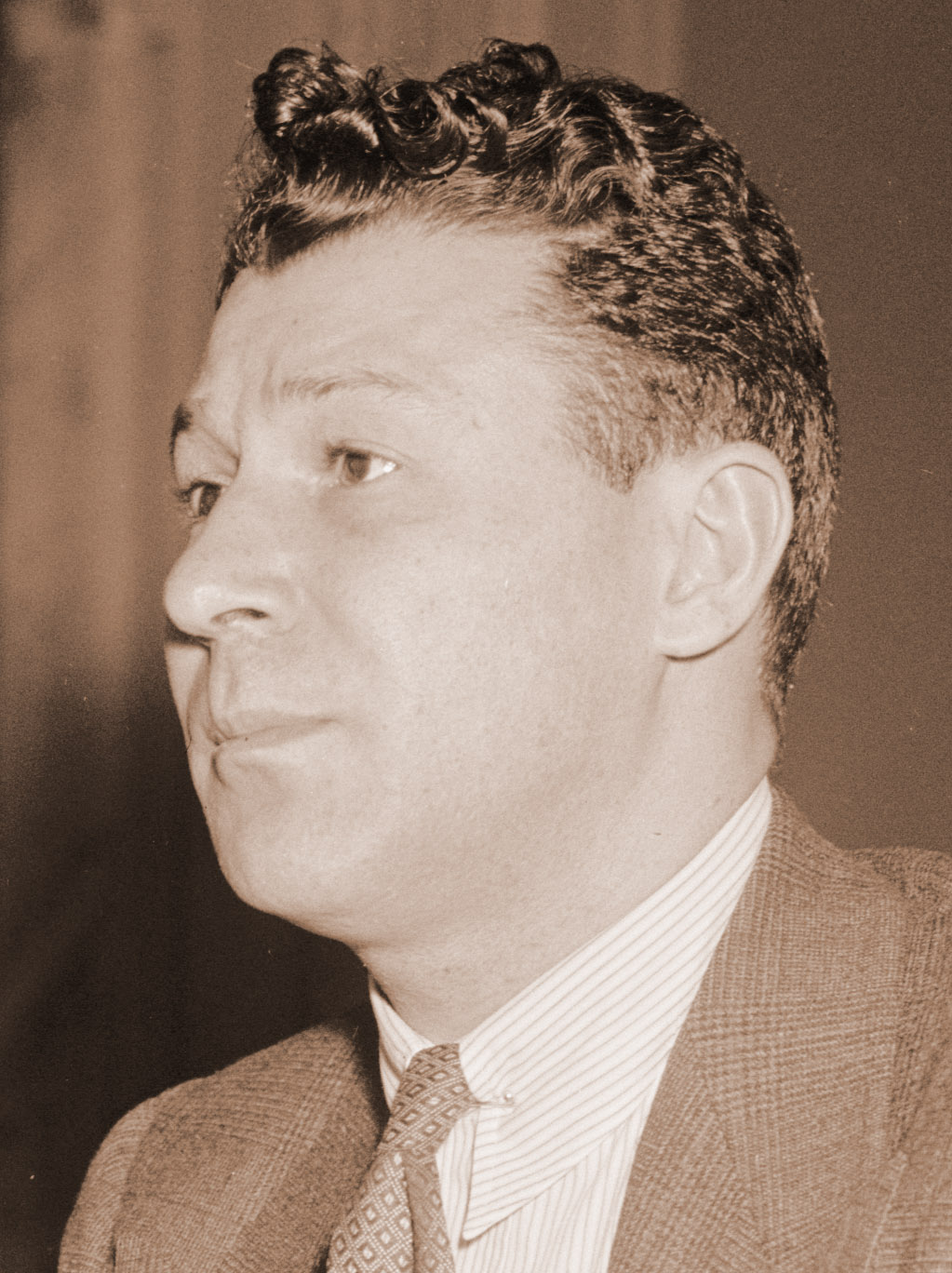
Lee Pressman (here during testimony before a Senate subcommittee on March 24, 1938) worked with Witt at the AAA (when they were both allegedly Ware Group members) and then was his law partner in 1950

Witt joined the Agricultural Adjustment Administration (AAA) in July 1933. His friend, Lee Pressman, recommended him for the job. According to accusers Whittaker Chambers, Lee Pressman, and Elizabeth Bentley, Witt—along with John Abt, Charles Kramer, Alger Hiss, and Nathaniel Weyl, among others—were part of the so-called "Ware group," a clandestine Communist Party USA group formed by AAA economist Harold Ware. Chambers also alleged that Witt became leader of the group after Ware died in an automobile accident in August 1935. Pressman said the men merely met to study and discuss left-wing political theory, but Chambers described it as a Soviet-controlled cell dedicated to committing espionage. Historian David M. Kennedy, assessing a half-century's evidence about the case, concurred with Pressman's assessment in 2001.

There is widespread disagreement as to whether Witt was actually a Communist Party member or not. Historian Arthur M. Schlesinger, Jr. observed that Chambers never provided evidence of Witt's party membership, just uncorroborated accusation. Labor historian Leon Fink agrees. Labor historian Nelson Lichtenstein, however, concluded that Witt "probably" was both a member of the Communist Party and held communist ideals, but historian Ronald Schatz has asserted that Witt's communist sympathies did "not necessarily" mean Party membership.

Witt never hid his communism and made it well known to others from his earliest days in the government. Chambers told Adolf A. Berle, then Assistant Secretary of State, about Witt's involvement in the "Ware group" in 1939. Berle later said that "to be blunt about it, Mr. Witt's statements and sympathies were so well known that what Mr. Chambers had said added nothing to anything that wasn't public knowledge at the time." William S. Leiserson, an NLRB Board member, knew Witt held communist beliefs almost from the first days after Leiserson joined the Board. There is general agreement among professional historians that Witt's communist views did not affect his work and did not change the outcome of any policy choices made by government agencies.

=== National Labor Relations Board (NLRB) ===
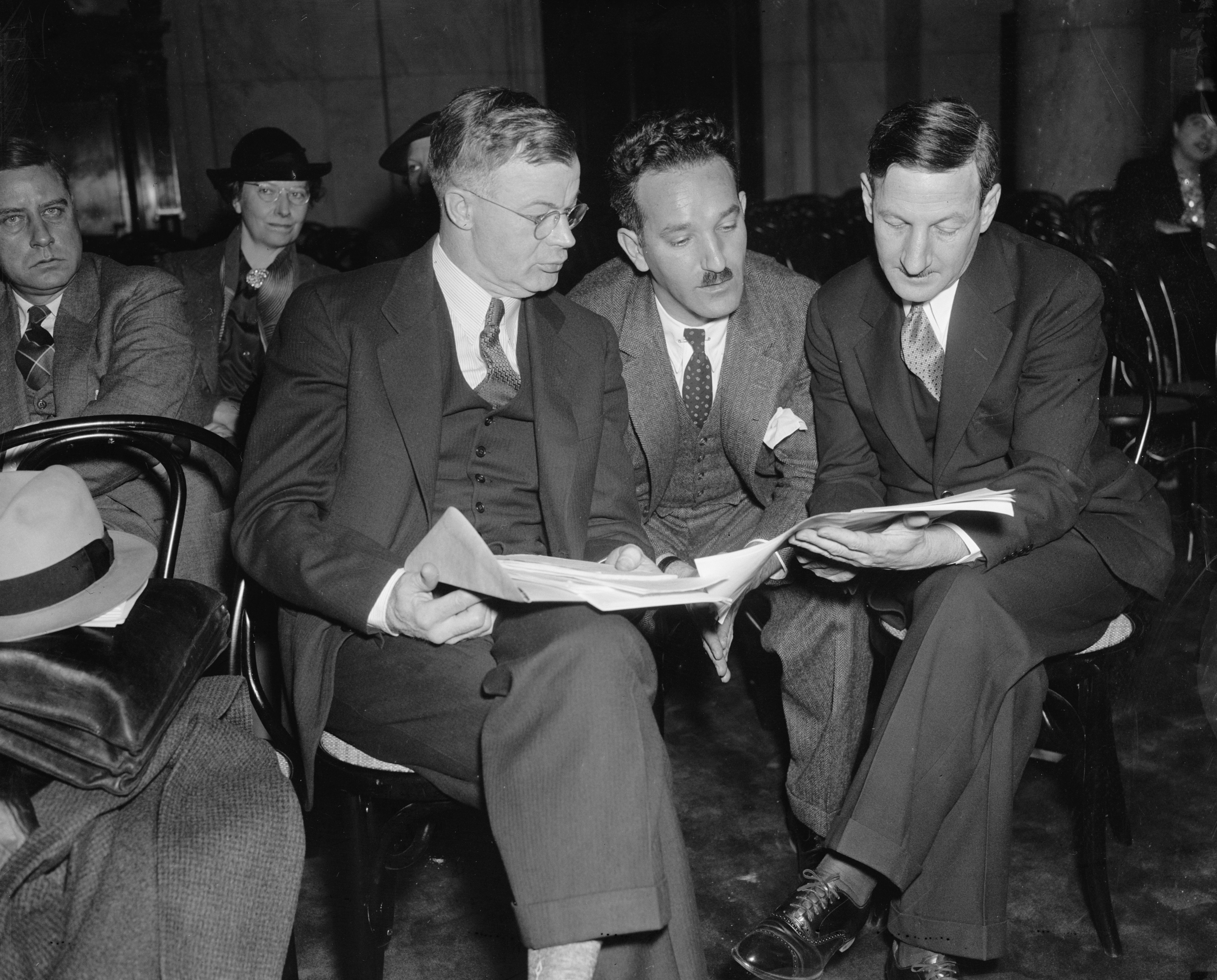
Witt (center) with NLRB Chair J. Warren Madden (left) and NLRB Chief Counsel Charles Fahy December 13, 1937

Witt joined the legal staff of the "first" National Labor Relations Board in February 1934. The National Labor Relations Act became law in June 1935, creating the "second" (permanent) NLRB. Witt was named the NLRB's assistant chief counsel ("assistant general counsel") in December 1935. He exerted a great deal of influence in the Review Section, the division of the NLRB which reviewed transcripts of NLRB hearings in labor disputes, revised transcripts to emphasize points of law, reviewed draft decisions of examiners for adherence to NLRB policy and law, and made oral reports to the three members of the Board. He chose (with the approval of the Board) the attorneys who staffed the Review Section, assigned cases to attorneys, and checked the drafts of Board decisions for technical accuracy. Witt recommended Pressman for a job as a trial examiner at the NLRB in 1936.

Witt was named Secretary (the highest non-appointed bureaucratic office—or "the top administrative officer") of the Board in October (or November) 1937. The enormous workload and tremendous expansion in the number of personnel at the NLRB made Witt the agency's most powerful individual. He attended Board meetings, took Board minutes, prepared and served Board decisions ordering union organizing elections, granted and denied requests for oral testimony from employers, oversaw each Board member's appointments and administered the office and oversaw the staff of 250. He was the Board's chief liaison to Congress and oversaw preparation and submission of the Board's budget. He was the sole supervisor of the Board's 22 regional offices, overseeing the roughly 225 personnel in the field. He alone exercised the authority to authorize a hearing in the case of unfair labor practice (ULP) or election cases, and he alone reported on these cases (in oral, not written) fashion to the Board. Almost all correspondence, telephone contact, and telegraph contact between the regional offices and the Board passed through his office first, and his office collected nearly all the information coming in from the field regarding elections, ULPs, settlements, strikes, enforcement issues, informational inquiries, and the development of new policies.

Witt's communism was the cause of much dispute within the NLRB and eventually led to his resignation as Board Secretary. The NLRB was under intense legal, media, congressional, and public criticism in 1938 and 1939 for what many people saw as overreaching.

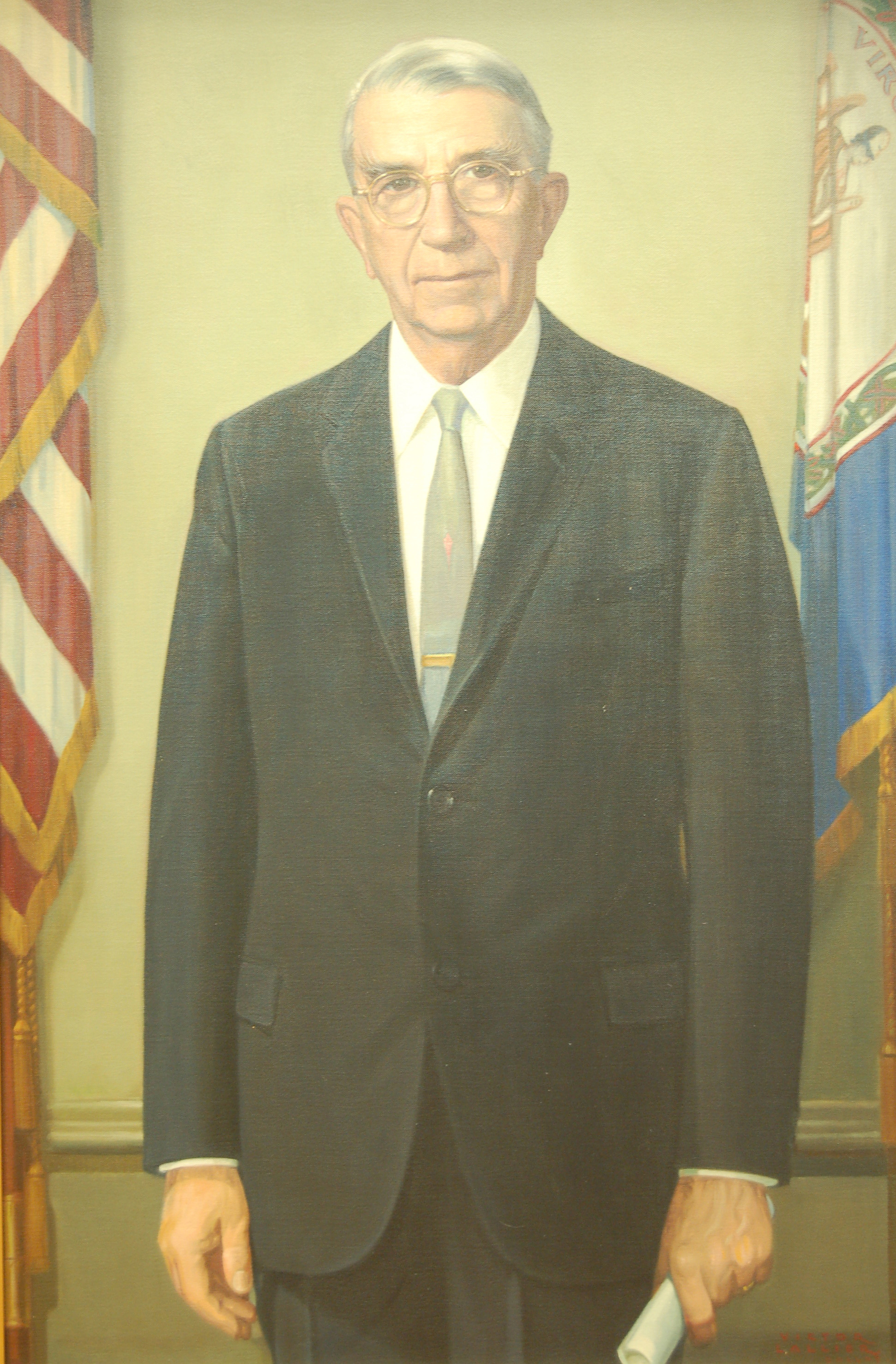
US Representative Howard Worth Smith led investigations into Witt's activities at NLRB

In July 1939, the House of Representatives created the Special Committee to Investigate the National Labor Relations Board (popularly known as the "Smith Committee" after its chairman, conservative Democratic Rep. Howard W. Smith—a "powerful, arch-segregationist and anti-Communist".) to investigate the NLRB. The Smith Committee received testimony from hundreds of witnesses, conducted a nationwide survey regarding the impact of the NLRB, and questioned NLRB officials at length about the agency's alleged anti-business and anti-American Federation of Labor/pro-Congress of Industrial Organizations biases.

From December 1939 to February 1940, the committee "probed Witt's handling of labor cases, strikes, and controversies." The committee weakened Witt in its accusation that he "hewed" to the Communist Party line. In response, Witt wrote to the committee that "I am not now, nor have I ever been, a member of the Communist Party, a 'Communist sympathizer,' or one who 'hews to the Communist Party line'."

In December 1939, board member Leiserson testified that he believed Witt held too much power at the NLRB, that Witt had influenced the NLRB's decisions in favor of the Congress of Industrial Organizations (CIO), and that Witt's far-left views were unacceptable. Leiserson testified that he had repeatedly voiced his concerns to board chairman J. Warren Madden, but that Madden and board member Edwin S. Smith had allied to prevent any attempt to rein in or fire Witt. Later testimony revealed that an internal NLRB study had backed Leiseron and that Madden and Smith had suppressed it, and that Witt had assisted Madden in secretly building public and expert support for the NLRB (expending federal funds in lobbying against Congress). Madden attempted to defend Witt.

By September 1940, the Smith Committee was accusing other NLRB employees, such as chief economist David J. Saposs, of harboring communist ideas. It was clear that neither Madden nor Witt could continue at the NLRB much longer. President Franklin D. Roosevelt named University of Chicago economics professor Harry A. Millis to be the new chairman of the NLRB in November 1940, after Madden's term on the Board expired in August.

Witt resigned from the NLRB on November 18, 1940, although his resignation was not accepted until after Millis was sworn in on November 27. He ended his work at the Board on December 10. Later that month, Witt joined Board member Edwin S. Smith, former Board associate general counsel Thomas I. Emerson, and four other NLRB attorneys in denying Smith Committee testimony that they were members of the Communist Party or had followed the CPUSA line in their work.

=== Witt & Cammer ===
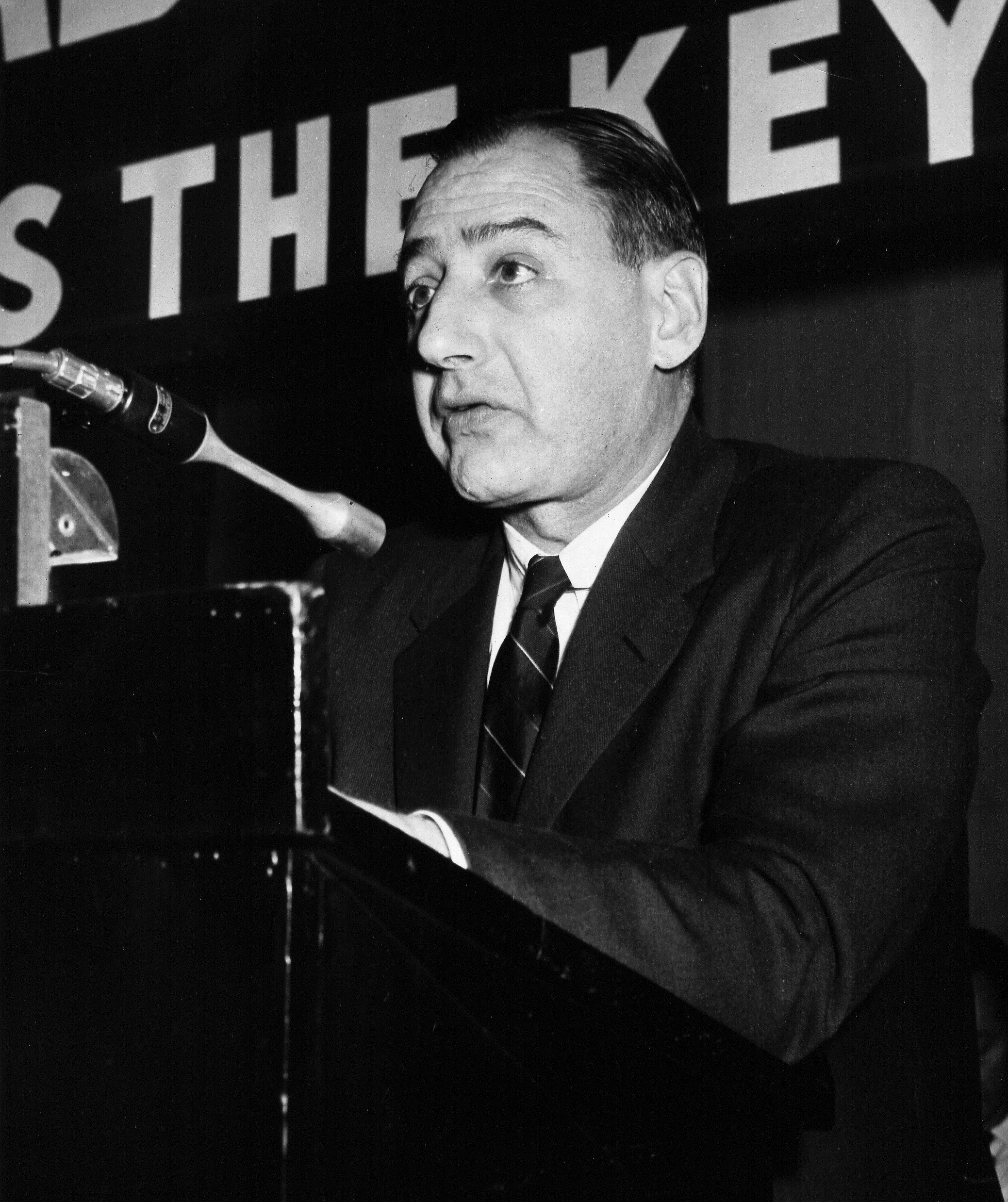
Harold I. Cammer was Witt's law partner as of 1941 and also legal counsel during hearings that started the Hiss Case in August 1948

In 1941, after leaving the NLRB, Witt joined with Harold I. Cammer (founder of the National Lawyers Guild) to form a law partnership of Witt & Cammer in New York City. (On November 24, 1947, the address for "Witt & Cammer, Esqs." was 9 East 40th Street, New York, NY.) New clients for Witt & Cammer included the CIO (in New York), other labor organizations, and left-wing unions like the International Union of Mine, Mill and Smelter Workers (known as "Mine-Mill"). In 1941, Witt represented the Steel Workers Organizing Committee (or SWOC, later, the United Steel Workers of America).

Witt was involved in numerous labor union disputes and labor-related free speech cases in the 1940s and 1950s. He represented members of the College Teachers Union (a predecessor to the modern Professional Staff Congress union at the City College of New York) when they were accused in 1941 of being communists by the Rapp-Coudert Committee. He briefly served as legal counsel to the International Fur & Leather Workers Union in 1944 in a major due process case. He was the lead attorney for the Seamen's Joint Action Committee, a CIO-backed insurgent group which allied with three CIO longshoremen's unions to challenge International Longshoremen's Association president Joseph Ryan.

=== Pressman, Witt & Cammer ===
Meantime, Pressman, remained as chief legal counsel of the CIO itself as well as the SWOC, both of which he had joined in the late 1930s, as Witt was joining and rising in the NLRB. In February 1948, Pressman left the CIO to create the private law practice of Pressman, Witt & Cammer. The firm became one of the most prominent left-wing labor law firms in the country. (Bella Abzug started her career at Pressman, Witt & Cammer.)

In early 1948, Witt's clients included the Greater New York CIO Council. As their counsel, he spoke to the press over allegations that FBI investigators were intimidating local CIO offices. "There could not possibly be any technical violation in 1948 except for the Isacson election and the FBI agents made clear they were not investigating that."

Also in early 1948, Witt was working with fellow National Lawyers Guild member Joseph Forer of Washington, DC. On January 26–28 and February 2, 1948, a hearing of the House Education and Labor Subcommittee, chaired by U.S. Representative Clare E. Hoffman, occurred on the topic of a strike by United Cafeteria and Restaurant Workers (Local 471) and its parent, the United Public Workers of America (UPWA), CIO, against Government Services, Inc. (GSI), which had already lasted nearly a month. UPWA was a client of Forer & Rein. Hoffman refused to let UPWA head Abram Flaxer read a statement and asked questions including whether Flaxer was a communist. Witt, one of his UAW attorneys, objected to "abuse of congressional power." On January 26, 1948, UPWA negotiations director Alfred Bernstein (father of Carl Bernstein), charged that House committee agents had raided the union's offices. During January, William S. Tyson, solicitor for the Labor Department, and Robert N. Denham, general counsel for the National Labor Relations Board, both agreed that nothing in the Taft-Hartley Act prohibited GSI from bargaining with a non-complying union. However, Denham added, the Act intended to "eliminate Communist influence from unions by denying to such unions the services of NLRB."

In 1950, Witt and partner Cammer defended the New York City Teachers Union (their client) against accusations from William Jansen, superintendent of New York City schools.

In 1950, Witt defended actor-singer Paul Robeson during a trial about Robeson's passport

In 1950, the U.S. State Department revoked singer and civil rights activist Paul Robeson's passport as a means of preventing him from traveling overseas and continuing his left-wing political work. Witt and Abt were among Robeson's first attorneys and initiated Robeson's eight-year battle to regain his passport.

He also represented several members of the Teachers Union accused of being communists in 1950 and 1952. (At the time, the Teachers Union was a local union representing New York City public schools teachers. It had been ejected by the American Federation of Teachers for being communist-controlled, and in the 1950s, it was part of the United Public Workers of America. It would later rejoin the American Federation of Teachers in the early 1960s and merge with another local to become the United Federation of Teachers.)

=== Later years ===
In 1955, he left Witt & Cammer and became full-time counsel to the International Union of Mine, Mill and Smelter Workers. He had a close connection to Albert Pezzati, who had been eastern regional director, national board member and secretary-treasurer of the International Union of Mine, Mill and Smelter Workers. (Like Witt, Pezzati had come under suspicion by HUAC of Communism.)

In 1961, Witt and Joseph Forer represented the International Union of Mine, Mill and Smelter Workers in Robert F. Kennedy, Attorney General of the United States, Petitioner, v. International Union of Mine, Mill and Smelter Workers, Respondent before the Subversive Activities Control Board.

When the International Union of Mine, Mill and Smelter Workers merged with and became a division of the United Steel Workers in the 1960s, Witt was retained as associate counsel for the new division. In 1975, Witt retired as associate counsel for the miners' division of the United Steel Workers.

== Allegations of communism ==
On August 3, 1948, in testimony to the House Un-American Activities Committee (HUAC), Whittaker Chambers named Witt as a member (and even leader) of the "Ware Group." When called before a one-man subcommittee of HUAC (whose sole member was Representative Richard Nixon) on August 20, Witt denied knowing "J. Peters" (ostensibly the head of the Soviet Union's political operations in the United States), Chambers, or Alger Hiss. Along with Abt and Pressman (with Cammer as legal counsel for all three), Witt invoked First, Fifth, and Sixth Amendment rights when refusing to answer HUAC questions. Lee Pressman, also testifying that day, forced the subcommittee to admit that it was not accusing the men of espionage but rather being communists seeking to infiltrate the government (which was not a crime). A few weeks later, former Daily Worker editor turned anti-communist Louis F. Budenz testified that the CPUSA considered Witt a member. Federal law enforcement officials debated prosecuting Witt in late 1948—not for being a communist, a spy, or for committing espionage, but under a contempt of Congress charge for asserting his Fifth Amendment rights before the committee and refusing to answer its questions. No prosecution was ever made. Having refused to answer questions before Congress, "Witt understood that the public saw that as tantamount to admitting guilt" to Communist activities.

Witt later testified in February 1949 before a federal grand jury investigating illegal CPUSA activities in the United States.

Testifying again before HUAC in 1950, Lee Pressman named Witt as a member of the CPUSA and the "Ware group." Speaking before a HUAC subcommittee on September 1, Witt once more denied that he had engaged in espionage, again invoked his Fifth Amendment privileges when asked about his CPUSA and "Ware group" membership, and refused to say whether he knew Chambers, Bentley, or scores of others.

In February 1952, writer Nathaniel Weyl named Witt as a "Ware group" member before the United States Senate Subcommittee on Internal Security.

Clinton Jencks (here in a clip from the 1954 movie Salt of the Earth) appeared before Congress with Witt several times in the 1950s

In 1952 and 1953, the McCarran Committee called Witt back to Congress. Harvey Matusow, former CPUSA member, had previously testified before Congress against his former comrades. However, in 1954, Matusow published a book, False Witness, in which he recanted his anti-communist testimony. In April 1955, the Subcommittee on Internal Security learned that Witt had obtained a cash donation from the Mine, Mill and Smelter Workers Union to help Matusow get his book published. Witt was called before the Subcommittee on Internal Security on April 18 to testify about his involvement in the Matusow affair. Witt freely admitted his legal role in obtaining the publication fee. Witt last appeared before Congress in 1955, eventually totaling six times, several times with Clinton Jencks from his client, the Mine-Mill union.

Senator James O. Eastland, subcommittee chair, then implied there was something suspicious about Witt's real name being Wittowsky. Witt engaged in a shouting match with Eastland, accusing the senator of antisemitism. Witt denied he had anything to hide. Eastland demanded to know about his membership in the CPUSA and the "Ware group," and Witt invoked his Fifth Amendment rights again. When a subcommittee member asked Witt if he had sent white lilies to Chambers (implying that this constituted a death threat), Witt categorically denied doing so.

== Personal life and death ==
On June 19, 1930, Nathan Witt married Anna Laura Phillips. They had two children, Hal Phillips Witt (1936–2021) and Leda Witt. Hal Witt worked with Joseph Forer in the 1960s on the Giles-Johnson case in defending the Giles brothers and in the Supreme Court Giles v. Maryland. Leda Witt was the biological mother of Paula Bernstein and Elyse Schein, the separated twins who were adopted by different families who didn't know they were twins. They reunited in 2004 and co-wrote Identical Strangers in 2007.

Nathan R. Witt died age 79 on February 16, 1982, at Rockefeller University Hospital in New York City.

== Legacy ==
In 1949, Edward R. Murrow had CBS News colleague Don Hollenbeck contribute to the innovative media-review program, CBS Views the Press over the radio network's flagship station WCBS. Hollenbeck discussed Edward U. Condon, Alger Hiss, and Paul Robeson. Regarding Hiss (during which case, as Loren Ghiglione has noted "Hollenbeck and his coverage of the reporting of the Hiss-Chambers case did not take sides on Hiss's guilt or innocence"), Hollenbeck criticized press coverage. For instance, he noted how a New York Journal-American story led a story stating "The government ended its cross-examination of Alger Hiss at 3:01 p.m. today after forcing him to admit he was an associate of Mrs. Carol King, prominent legal defender of Communists, and a friend of Nathan Witt, ex-New Deal lawyer who was fired because of his Communist activities." Hollenbeck noted that the transcript differed greatly, in that Hiss had said: he had met King "once or twice," while his description of when and where he met Witt even less clear. He also noted the guilt by association tactics of fellow journalists, for example, Westbrook Pegler, who sought to discredit Eleanor Roosevelt through link to Hiss via Felix Frankfurter.

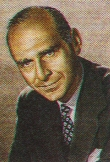
David A. Morse recalled accusations against Witt during a 1977 interview

In 1977 during an interview, David A. Morse (1907–1990), recounted that in 1949, shortly after he had finished work as NLRB general counsel and become a US delegate to the International Labor Conference of the International Labour Organization (ILO):

At about that time, I think there were all these questions being raised about certain people in the Labor Board; not so much about their qualifications as their political orientation and what Paul Herzog wrote there may have been as a result of that. I remember there was this chap, Nat Witt, who had been head of the unit at the NLRB, that was responsible for the examiners. I recall that he had been accused from time to time by outside groups for being much tied in with Lee Pressman and the two of them were very much tied in with the Communist Party.

== See also ==
- List of American spies
- John Abt
- Whittaker Chambers
- Noel Field
- Harold Glasser
- John Herrmann
- Alger Hiss
- Donald Hiss
- Victor Perlo
- J. Peters
- Ward Pigman
- Lee Pressman
- Vincent Reno
- Julian Wadleigh
- Harold Ware
- Nathaniel Weyl
- Harry Dexter White

== Bibliography ==
- Auerbach, Jerold S. Unequal Justice: Lawyers and Social Change in Modern America. New York: Oxford University Press, 1976.
- Baker, Russell. "Aid for Matusow on Book Depicted." New York Times. April 19, 1955.
- Barkley, Frederick R. "Madden Declares NLRB Record Best and Defends Witt." New York Times. February 2, 1940.
- "Board in a Tumult Over School Cases." New York Times. May 10, 1950.
- Burnham, James. The Web of Subversion: Underground Networks in the U.S. Government. New York: J. Day Co., 1954.
- Caballero, Raymond. McCarthyism vs. Clinton Jencks. Norman OK: University of Oklahoma Press, 2019.
- Chambers, Whittaker. Witness. New York: Random House, 1952.
- "College Teachers to Fight Inquiry." New York Times. February 20, 1941.
- "Deadlock on Pier Contract Seen." New York Times. October 24, 1945.
- "Defense Profit Aim Laid to Bethlehem." New York Times. March 25, 1941.
- "Demand for 3-Man Arbitration Panel Snarls Efforts to Settle Longshoremen's Dispute." New York Times. November 3, 1945.
- "Dock Workers Win 20% Pay Increase." New York Times. January 1, 1946.
- Dubofsky, Melvyn. The State and Labor in Modern America. Chapel Hill, N.C.: University of North Carolina Press, 1994.
- "8 Teachers Deny Board's Charges." New York Times. February 21, 1952.
- Fink, Leon. In Search of the Working Class: Essays in American Labor History and Political Culture. Urbana, Ill.: University of Illinois Press, 1994.
- "Fur Trade Argues 'Right to Fire' Case." New York Times. October 29, 1944.
- Gall, Gilbert J. Pursuing Justice: Lee Pressman, the New Deal, and the CIO. Albany, N.Y.: State University of New York Press, 1999.
- "Green Says Inquiry Shows NLRB Biased." New York Times. December 21, 1939.
- Gross, James A. The Making of the National Labor Relations Board: A Study in Economics, Politics, and the Law. Albany, N.Y.: State University of New York Press, 1974.
- Gross, James A. The Reshaping of the National Labor Relations Board: National Labor Policy in Transition, 1937-1947. Albany, N.Y.: State University of New York Press, 1981.
- Haynes, John Earl and Klehr, Harvey. Venona: Decoding Soviet Espionage in America. New Haven, Conn.: Yale University Press, 2000.
- Heard, Alex. The Eyes of Willie McGee: A Tragedy of Race, Sex, and Secrets in the Jim Crow South. New York: Harper, 2010.
- Horne, George. "CIO Backs Rebels." New York Times. October 14, 1945.
- Horne, George. "Warren Is Beaten in Longshore Feud." New York Times. October 20, 1945.
- Hurd, Charles. "Roosevelt Names Dr. Millis to NLRB, Replacing Madden." New York Times. November 16, 1940.
- Illson, Murray. "Board in Tumult Over 8 Teachers." New York Times. February 8, 1952.
- Irons, Peter H. The New Deal Lawyers. Reprint ed. Princeton, N.J.: Princeton University Press, 1993.
- "Jansen Questions 6 More Teachers." New York Times. April 25, 1950.
- Jowitt, William Allen and Jowitt, Earl. The Strange Case of Alger Hiss. London: Hodder & Stoughton, 1953.
- Kennedy, David. Freedom From Fear: The American People in Depression and War, 1929-1945. New York, N.Y.: Oxford University Press, 2001.
- "Leiserson in Feud." New York Times. December 12, 1939.
- Lichtenstein, Nelson. Labor's War at Home: The CIO in World War II. Reprint ed. New York: Cambridge University Press, 1987.
- "Links Saposs, Brooks to NLRB Red Talk." New York Times. September 28, 1940.
- "Millis Is Sworn In As NLRB Chairman." New York Times. November 28, 1940.
- Morris, John D. "Communists Held Hiss to Be Member, Budenz Testifies." New York Times. August 27, 1948.
- "Named Labor Board Aides." New York Times. December 4, 1935.
- "Nathan Witt Is Heard." New York Times. February 24, 1949.
- "Nathan Witt, Labor Lawyer; Ex-Secretary of the N.L.R.B." The New York Times. February 20, 1982. p. 21.
- "NLRB Employees Deny Any Communist Ties." New York Times. December 24, 1940.
- Phillips, Cabell. "Washington Debating Value of 'Spy Trials'." New York Times. September 12, 1948.
- "Pier Insurgents Win Court Order Blocking Ryan on New Contract." New York Times. October 26, 1945.
- "Prosecution Aimed at 5 in Red Inquiry." United Press International. October 3, 1948.
- Resner, Lawrence. "Owners Are Silent." New York Times. October 15, 1945.
- "Robeson Asks Court to Lift Passport Ban." United Press International. December 20, 1950.
- Schatz, Ronald W. "From Commons to Dunlop: Rethinking the Field and Theory of Industrial Relations." In Industrial Democracy in America: The Ambiguous Promise. Nelson Lichtenstein and Howell John Harris, eds. Washington, D.C.: Woodrow Wilson Center Press, 1993.
- Schlesinger, Arthur M. The Politics of Hope and the Bitter Heritage: American Liberalism in the 1960s. Princeton, N.J.: Princeton University Press, 2008.
- "School Union Ends Fight on Subpoenas." New York Times. February 14, 1941.
- "Split in Two-Man Board Balks NLRB Resignations." New York Times. November 21, 1940.
- Stark, Louis. "Madden Defends NLRB on Lobbying." New York Times. February 9, 1940.
- Stark, Louis. "Methods of NLRB Indicated in Study Made By Own Men." New York Times. March 22, 1940.
- Stark, Louis. "NLRB Rounded Up List of Witnesses to Back Labor Act." New York Times. February 21, 1940.
- Strategy and Tactics of World Communism: Hearing before the Subcommittee to Investigate the Administration of the Internal Security Act and Other Internal Security Laws of the Committee on the Judiciary. Committee on the Judiciary. United States Senate. 84th Cong., 1st sess. Washington, D.C.: U.S. Government Printing Office, 1955.
- "Subpoenas Served in Teacher Inquiry." New York Times. February 15, 1941.
- Trussell, C.P. "Abt, Witt, Kramer Defy House Group." New York Times. September 2, 1950.
- Trussell, C.P. "Pressman, Abt, Witt Refuse to Answer Spy Ring Questions." New York Times. August 21, 1948.
- Trussell, C.P. "Pressman Names Three in New Deal As Reds With Him." New York Times. August 29, 1950.
- "Two Hiss Brothers Deny Red Charges." New York Times. August 4, 1948.
- "Witt Ends Work With NLRB." New York Times. December 12, 1940.
- "Writer Calls Hiss Red Cell Member." New York Times. February 20, 1952.
