= Dean Fansler =

American professor at Columbia University and Filipino folklorist

Dean Fansler, also Dean S. Fansler, was an American professor. He was a teacher of English at Columbia University in the early 20th century and brother of Priscilla Hiss (wife of Alger Hiss), who, as a "noted folklorist" helped preserve Filipino folklore culture in the early 20th century, after centuries of Spanish and American domination.

== Background ==
Dean Spruill Fansler was born in 1885. His father was Thomas Lafayette Fansler, mother Willa Roland Spruill, and younger sister Priscilla Hiss, born Priscilla Harriet Fansler. In 1906, he received a BA from Northwestern University and MA (1907) and doctorate (1913) from Columbia.

== Career ==
In 1908, Fansler started working at the University of the Philippines. From then through 1914, he collected Filipino folklore tales.

By 1914, Fansler appears in the Columbia College catalog as an assistant professor of English. In the early 1920s, Fansler was a professor at Columbia College and receives mention as an acquaintance (probably teacher) in the first autobiography of Mortimer J. Adler.

Franz Boas recommended that Fansler earn his doctorate and inspired him to prepare Philippine material for publication.

== Works ==
In 1956, the "most widely known collection of Philippine folktales" was Dean Fansler's Filipino Popular Tales.

- Chaucer and the 'Roman a la Rose' (1914)
- Filipino Popular Tales (1921)

== See also ==
- Mortimer J. Adler
- Alger Hiss
- Priscilla Hiss
