= Alger Hiss =

American diplomat and accused Soviet spy (1904–1996)

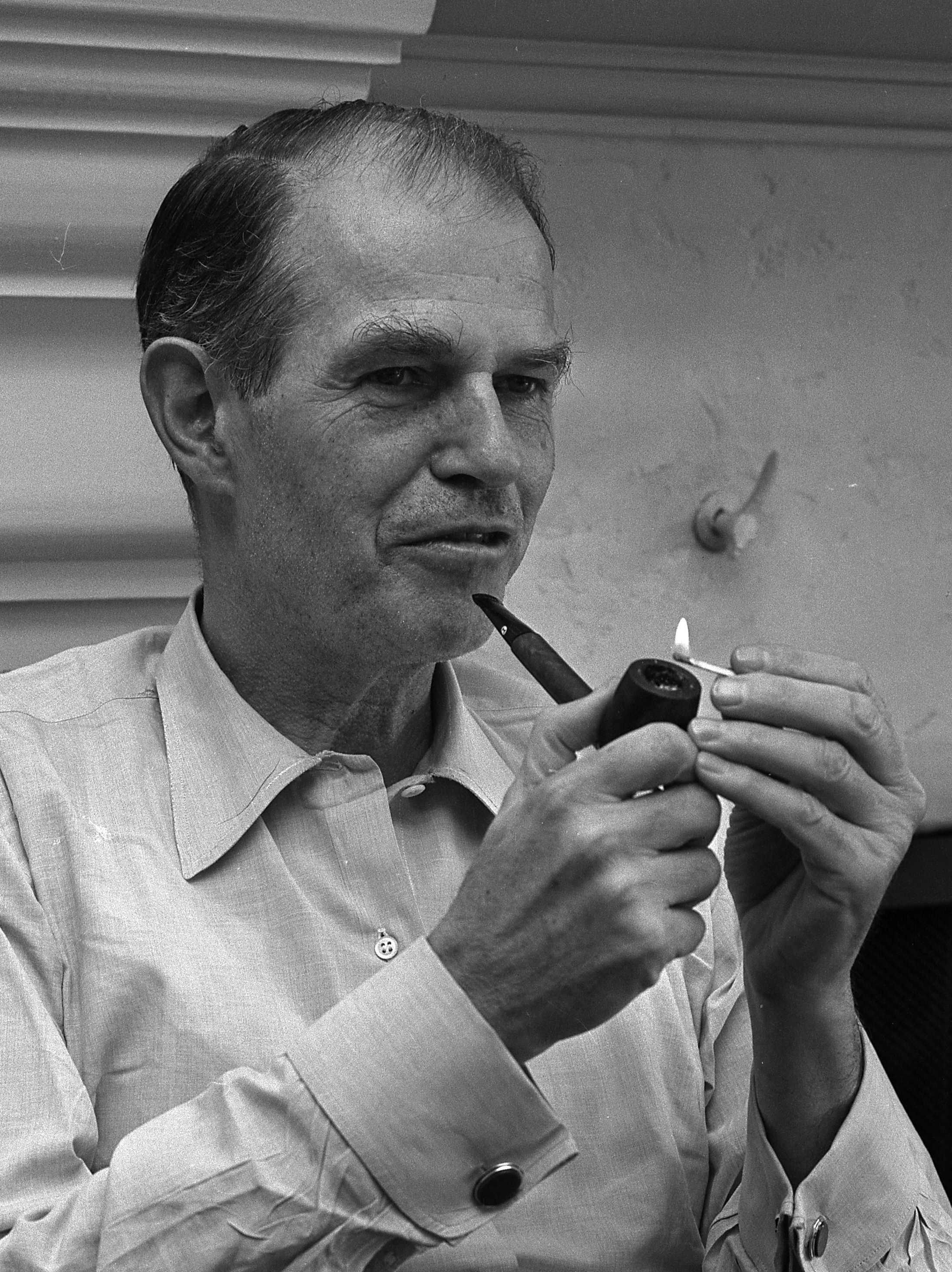
- Hiss in 1965
- Born: November 11, 1904; Baltimore, Maryland, U.S.
- Died: November 15, 1996 (aged 92); New York City, U.S.
- Education: Johns Hopkins University (BA); Harvard University (LLB)
- Known for: Being accused of espionage
- Criminal charge: 2 counts of perjury
- Criminal penalty: 2 concurrent terms of 5 years in prison
- Criminal status: Released after 3 years and 8 months
- Spouses: Priscilla Fansler Hobson (m. 1929; died 1984) Isabel Johnson (m. 1985)
- Relatives: Anna Hiss (sister); Donald Hiss (brother)

Alger Hiss (November 11, 1904 – November 15, 1996) was an American government official who, in 1948, was accused of spying for the Soviet Union in the 1930s. The statute of limitations had expired for espionage, but he was convicted of perjury in connection with this charge in 1950. Before the trial, Hiss was involved in the establishment of the United Nations, both as a U.S. State Department official and as a UN official. In later life, he worked as an author, lecturer and salesman.

On August 3, 1948, Whittaker Chambers, a former Communist Party USA member, testified under subpoena before the House Un-American Activities Committee (HUAC) that Hiss had secretly been a communist while in federal service. Hiss categorically denied the charge and subsequently sued Chambers for libel. During the pretrial discovery process of the libel case, Chambers produced new evidence allegedly indicating that he and Hiss had been involved in espionage. A federal grand jury indicted Hiss on two counts of perjury. After a mistrial due to a hung jury, Hiss was tried a second time, and in January 1950 he was found guilty and received two concurrent five-year sentences, of which he eventually served three and a half years.

Arguments about the case and the validity of the verdict took center stage in broader debates about the Cold War, McCarthyism, and the extent of Soviet espionage in the United States. Since Hiss's conviction, statements by involved parties and newly exposed evidence have added to the dispute. In the 1990s, two former senior Soviet military officers responsible for the Soviet Union's military intelligence archives stated, following a search of those archives, that the "Russian intelligence service has no documents proving that Alger Hiss cooperated with our service somewhere or anywhere", and that Hiss "never had any relationship with Soviet intelligence." The 1995 Venona papers provided "persuasive but not conclusive" evidence for the theory that Hiss was a Soviet spy. Author Anthony Summers argued in 2000 that since many relevant files continue to be unavailable, the Hiss controversy will continue to be debated, with political divisions marking belief in Hiss's innocence or guilt. Hiss himself maintained his innocence until his death in 1996.

== Early life and education ==
Born in Baltimore, Maryland, on November 11, 1904, Alger Hiss was one of five children of Mary "Minnie" Lavinia (née Hughes) and Charles Alger Hiss. Both parents came from substantial Baltimore families who could trace their roots to the middle of the 18th century. Hiss's paternal great-great-grandfather had emigrated from Germany in 1729, and changed his surname from "Hesse" to "Hiss."

Minnie Hughes attended teacher's college and was active in Baltimore society. Shortly after his marriage at age 24, Charles Hiss entered the business world and joined the dry goods importing firm Daniel Miller and Co., where he became an executive and shareholder.

When Charles' brother John died suddenly at the age of 33, Charles assumed financial and emotional responsibility for his brother's widow and six children in addition to his own expanding family. Charles also helped his wife's favorite brother, Albert Hughes, find work at Daniel Miller. Hughes at first distinguished himself and was promoted to treasurer of the firm, but then he became involved in a complicated business deal and was unable to meet the financial obligation that was part of a joint agreement.

In 1907, the year of great financial panic, Charles Hiss felt compelled to sell all his stocks to make good his brother-in-law's debts and to resign from the firm. After unsuccessful attempts by relatives to find him a job, Charles fell into a serious depression and committed suicide, cutting his throat with a razor. Minnie, who had made the most of her former prosperity and social position, was then forced to rely on her inheritance and financial assistance from family members.

Alger Hiss was two years old when his father died. As was customary in those days, he was not told of the circumstances of Charles Hiss's death. When Alger learned of it inadvertently years later from neighbors, he angrily confronted his older brother Bosley, who then told him the truth. Shocked, Hiss resolved to devote the rest of his life to restoring the family's "good name."

Although shadowed by melancholy, Hiss's early childhood, spent in rough-and-tumble games with his siblings and cousins who lived close by, was not unhappy. Their Baltimore neighborhood was described by columnist Murray Kempton as one of "shabby gentility." Hiss portrayed the economic circumstances of his childhood as "modest," but "not particularly shabby." Two further tragedies occurred when Hiss was in his twenties: his elder brother Bosley died of Bright's disease and his sister Mary Ann committed suicide.

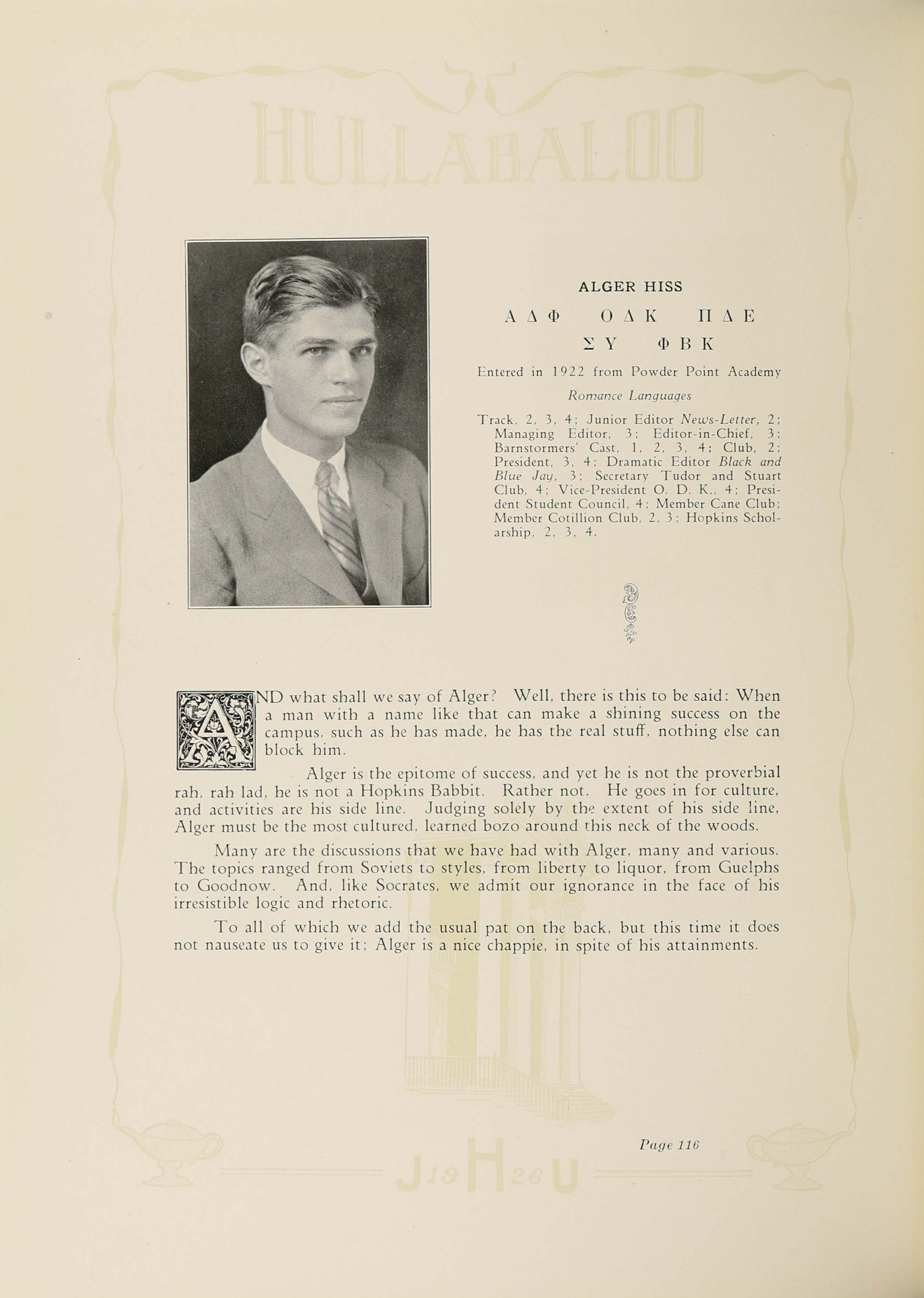
Hiss in the Johns Hopkins University yearbook, 1926

At school, young Alger Hiss was popular and high performing. He attended high school at Baltimore City College and college at Johns Hopkins University, where he was voted "most popular student" by his classmates, and graduated Phi Beta Kappa. In 1929, he received his law degree from Harvard Law School, where he was a protégé of Felix Frankfurter, the future US Supreme Court justice. During his time at Harvard, the famous murder trial of anarchists Nicola Sacco and Bartolomeo Vanzetti took place, ending in their conviction and execution. Like Frankfurter, who wrote a book about the case, and like many prominent liberals of the day, Hiss maintained that Sacco and Vanzetti were convicted unjustly.

Hiss served for a year as clerk to Supreme Court Justice Oliver Wendell Holmes Jr., before joining Choate, Hall & Stewart, a Boston law firm, and later the New York City law firm then known as Cotton, Franklin, Wright & Gordon.

== Career ==
During the era of President Franklin D. Roosevelt's New Deal, Hiss became a government attorney. In 1933, he served briefly at the Justice Department and then became a temporary assistant on the Senate's Nye Committee, investigating cost overruns and alleged profiteering by military contractors during World War I. During this period, Hiss was also a member of the liberal legal team headed by Jerome Frank that defended the Agricultural Adjustment Administration (AAA) against challenges to its legitimacy, though his primary role was writing contracts. Because of intense opposition from agribusiness in Arkansas, Frank and his left-wing assistants, who included future labor lawyer Lee Pressman, were fired in 1935 in what came to be known as "the purge of liberals." Hiss was not fired, but allegations that during this period he was connected with radicals on the Agriculture Department's legal team were to be the source of future controversy.

In the meantime, Hiss also served initially as investigator and then legal assistant (counsel) to the Nye Committee from July 1934 to August 1935. In early 1935, the committee investigated the financial records of the DuPont company. Counsel Alger Hiss and Senator Nye aggressively questioned Bernard Baruch and other DuPont executives about their international cartel agreements, lobbying efforts, and the morality of wartime arms manufacturing, revealing they had generated enormous wealth. In 1947, Baruch and Hiss both attended the burial of Nicholas Murray Butler. In 1988, he called Baruch a "vain and overrated Polonius much given to trite pronouncements about the nation."

In May 1936, Alger Hiss and his younger brother Donald Hiss began working under Cordell Hull in the State Department. Alger was an assistant to Assistant Secretary of State Francis B. Sayre (son-in-law of Woodrow Wilson) and then special assistant to the director of the Office of Far Eastern Affairs. From 1939 to 1944, Hiss was an assistant to Stanley Hornbeck, a special adviser to Cordell Hull on Far Eastern affairs.

In 1944, Hiss was named Director of the Office of Special Political Affairs, a policy-making entity devoted to planning for post-war international organizations. Hiss served as executive secretary of the Dumbarton Oaks Conference, which drew up plans for the future United Nations. In November 1944, Hull, who had led the United Nations project, retired as Secretary of State due to poor health and was succeeded by Undersecretary of State Edward Stettinius.

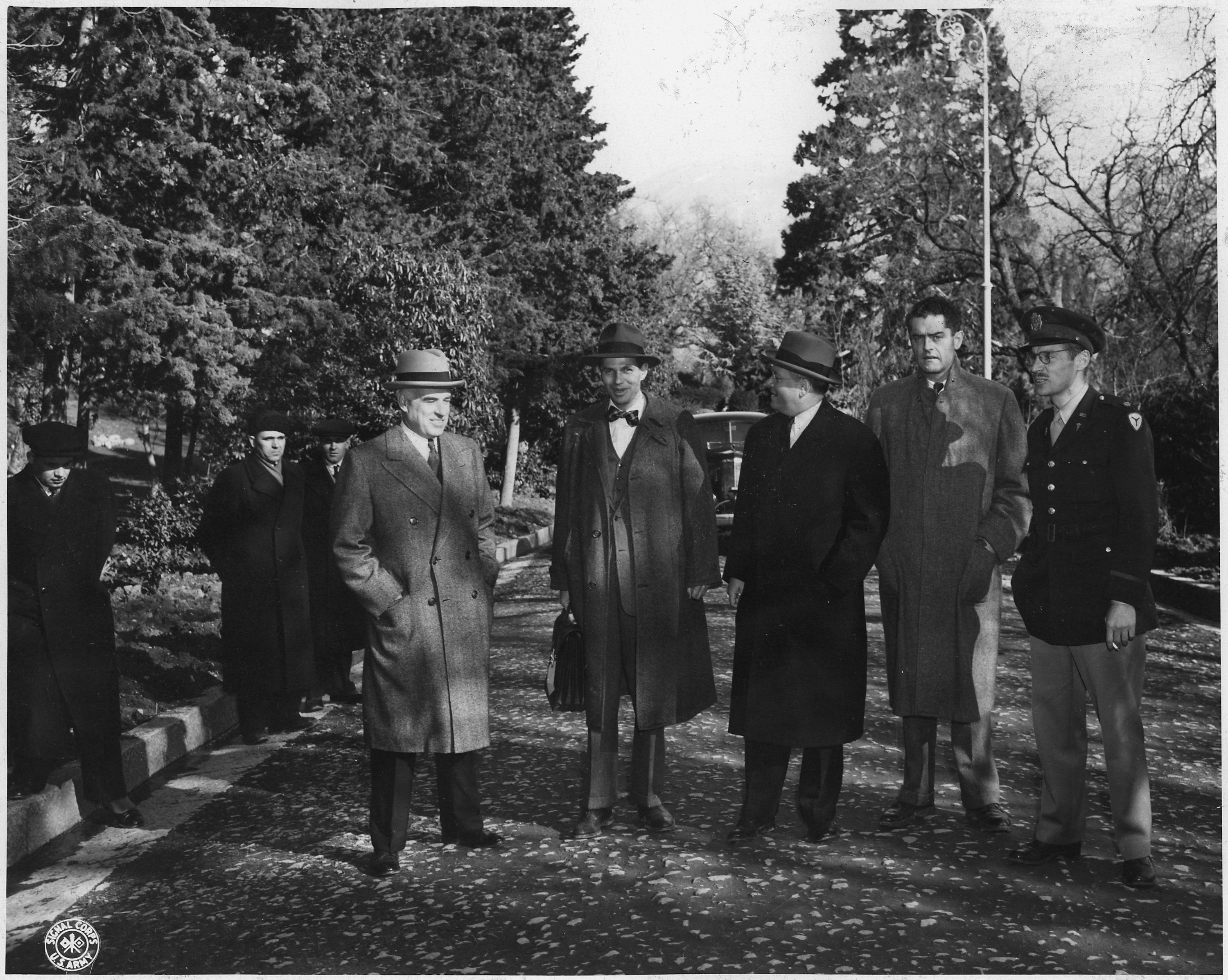
Hiss (front row, second from left) with Edward Stettinius (front row, far left) in Yalta c. January 1945

In February 1945, as a member of the US delegation headed by Stettinius, Hiss attended the Yalta Conference, where the Big Three, Franklin D. Roosevelt, Joseph Stalin, and Winston Churchill, met to consolidate their alliance to forestall any possibility, now that the Soviets had entered German territory, that any of them might make a separate peace with the Nazi regime. Negotiations addressed the postwar division of Europe and configuration of its borders; reparations and de-Nazification; and the still unfinished plans, carried over from Dumbarton Oaks, for the United Nations. Before the conference took place, Hiss participated in the meetings where the American draft of the "Declaration of Liberated Europe" was created. The Declaration concerned the political future of Eastern Europe and critics on the right later charged that it made damaging concessions to the Soviets.

Hiss stated that he was responsible for assembling background papers and documentation for the conference "and any general matters that might come up relating to the Far East or the Near East."

Hiss drafted a memorandum arguing against Stalin's proposal (made at Dumbarton Oaks) to give one vote to each of the sixteen Soviet republics in the United Nations General Assembly. Fearing isolation, Stalin hoped thus to counterbalance the votes of the many countries of the British Empire, who he anticipated would vote with Britain, and those of Latin America, who could be expected to vote in lockstep with the United States. In the final compromise offered by Roosevelt and Stettinius and accepted by Stalin, the Soviets obtained three votes: one each for the Soviet Union itself, the Ukrainian SSR, and the Byelorussian SSR.

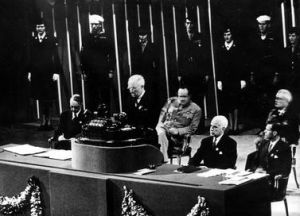
President Harry S. Truman addresses the first UN Conference in San Francisco (from left: unknown person, Truman, Harry Vaughan, Edward Stettinius, Hiss) on June 26, 1945.

Hiss was Secretary-General of the United Nations Conference on International Organization (the convention that created the UN Charter), which was held in San Francisco from April 25, 1945, to June 26, 1945. Allen Weinstein wrote that Andrei Gromyko, the Soviet delegate to the conference, praised Hiss to his superior Stettinius for his "impartiality and fairness." Hiss later became full Director of the State Department's Office of Special Political Affairs. In late 1946, Hiss left government service to become president of the Carnegie Endowment for International Peace, where he served until May 5, 1949, the end of the presidential term to which he had been elected, when he was forced to step down.

== Accusation of espionage ==
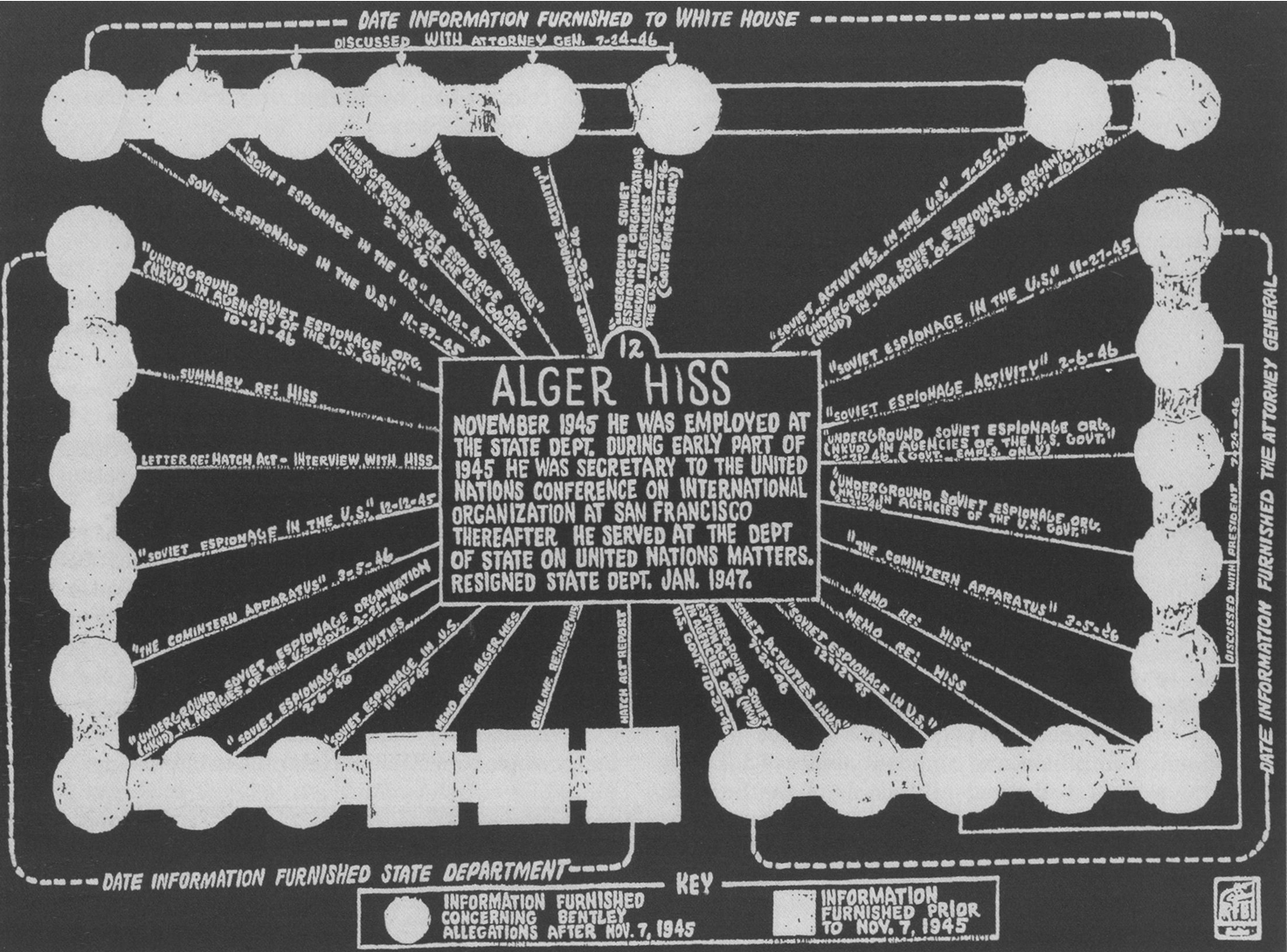
The FBI's "Hiss chart," illustrating information on Hiss's activities, 1948

On August 3, 1948, Whittaker Chambers, a former Communist Party member, appeared before the House Un-American Activities Committee (HUAC) to denounce Alger Hiss. A senior editor at Time magazine, Chambers had written a scathingly satirical editorial critical of the Yalta agreements. The group, which Chambers called the "Ware Group," had been organized by agriculturalist Harold Ware, an American communist intent on organizing black and white tenant farmers in the American South against exploitation and debt peonage by the cotton industry (Ware had died in 1935). According to Chambers, "the purpose of this group at that time was not primarily espionage. Its original purpose was the communist infiltration of the American government. But espionage was certainly one of its eventual objectives." As journalist and author Tim Weiner points out, "This was a crucial point. Infiltration and invisible political influence were immoral, but arguably not illegal. Espionage was treason, traditionally punishable by death. The distinction was not lost on the cleverest member of HUAC, Congressman Richard Nixon.... He had been studying the FBI's files for five months, courtesy of J. Edgar Hoover. Nixon launched his political career in hot pursuit of Hiss and the alleged secret Communists of the New Deal."

Rumors had circulated about Hiss since 1939, when Chambers, at the urging of anti-Stalinist Isaac Don Levine, went to Assistant Secretary of State Adolf A. Berle Jr. and accused Hiss of belonging to an underground communist cell at the Department of Agriculture. In 1942, Chambers repeated this allegation to the FBI. In 1945, two other sources emerged to implicate Hiss. In September 1945, Igor Gouzenko, a 26-year-old Russian whose three-year tour as a cipher clerk stationed at the Soviet Embassy in Ottawa was coming to an end, defected from the Soviet Union and remained in Canada. In exchange for asylum, Gouzenko offered to Canadian authorities evidence about a Soviet espionage network actively working to acquire information about nuclear weapons, along with information that an unnamed assistant (or more precisely an "assistant to an assistant") to US Secretary of State Stettinius was a Soviet agent. When informed of this, Hoover assumed Gouzenko was referring to Alger Hiss. Three months later (in December 1945), Elizabeth Bentley, an American spy for the Soviet Union, who served also as a courier between communist groups, told the FBI, as documented in the FBI Silvermaster File that "At this time Kramer told me that the person who had originally taken Glasser away from Perlo's group was named Hiss and that he was in the U.S. State Department." Bentley also said that the man in question, whom she called "Eugene Hiss" worked in the State Department and was an adviser to Dean Acheson. In both cases (Gouzenko and Bentley), the FBI decided that Alger Hiss was the likely match. Hoover put a wiretap on Hiss's home phone and had him and his wife investigated and tailed for the next two years.

In response to Chambers's accusations, Hiss protested his innocence and insisted on appearing before HUAC to clear himself. Testifying on August 5, 1948, he denied having ever been a communist or having personally met Chambers. Under fire from President Truman and the press, the committee was reluctant to proceed with its investigation against so eminent a man. Congressman Richard Nixon, who later described Hiss's demeanor that day as, "insolent," "condescending," and "insulting in the extreme," wanted to press on. Nixon had received secret information about the FBI's suspicions from John Francis Cronin, a Roman Catholic priest who had infiltrated labor unions in Baltimore during World War II to report on communist activities and had been given access to FBI files. Writing in a paper titled "The Problem of American Communism In 1945," Cronin wrote, "In the State Department, the most influential Communist has been Alger Hiss."

With some reluctance, the Committee voted to make Nixon chair of a subcommittee that would seek to determine who was lying, Hiss or Chambers, at least on the question of whether they knew one another.

Shown a photograph of Chambers, Hiss conceded that the face "might look familiar" and asked to see Chambers in person. Confronted with him in person in a New York hotel where HUAC was holding session, Hiss admitted that he had indeed known Chambers, but under the name "George Crosley," a man who represented himself as a freelance writer. Hiss said that in the mid-1930s he had sublet his apartment to this "Crosley" and had given him an old car. Chambers, for his part, denied on the stand ever having used the alias Crosley, though he admitted to Hiss's lawyers in private testimony that it could have been one of his pen names. When Hiss and Chambers both appeared before a HUAC subcommittee on August 17, 1948, they had the following exchange:

HISS. Did you ever go under the name of George Crosley?
CHAMBERS. Not to my knowledge.
HISS. Did you ever sublet an apartment on Twenty-ninth Street from me?
CHAMBERS. No; I did not.
HISS. You did not?
CHAMBERS. No.
HISS. Did you ever spend any time with your wife and child in an apartment on Twenty-ninth Street in Washington when I was not there because I and my family were living on P Street?
CHAMBERS. I most certainly did.
HISS. You did or did not?
CHAMBERS. I did.
HISS. Would you tell me how you reconcile your negative answers with this affirmative answer?
CHAMBERS. Very easily, Alger. I was a Communist and you were a Communist.

Chambers's statements, because they were made in a Congressional hearing, were privileged against defamation suits; Hiss challenged Chambers to repeat them without benefit of such protection. When, on the national radio program Meet the Press, Chambers publicly called Hiss a communist, Hiss had attorney William L. Marbury Jr. file a libel lawsuit against him.

Chambers retaliated by claiming Hiss was not merely a communist, but also a spy, a charge he had not made earlier; and, on November 17, 1948, to support his explosive allegations he produced physical evidence consisting of sixty-five pages of re-typed State Department documents, the last of which was dated April 1, 1938, plus four notes in Hiss's handwriting summarizing the contents of State Department cables. These became known as the "Baltimore documents." Chambers claimed Hiss had given them to him in 1938 and that Priscilla had retyped them (Hiss could not type) on the Hisses' Woodstock typewriter for Chambers to pass along to the Soviets. One of the handwritten notes copied the contents of a telegram (received January 28, 1938) related to the November and December 1937 arrest and disappearance in Moscow of a Latvian-born man and his wife, an American citizen. Under questioning, neither Hiss nor his superior, Francis Sayre, recollected the incident. Hiss initially denied writing the note, but experts confirmed it was his handwriting. Interrogated in 1949, Sayre stated that the telegram was unrelated to Hiss's duties, which concerned trade matters and told his questioners, "He could not understand why he was on the distribution list for this cable nor why the note would be made on it or especially why an exact copy should be made."

In their previous testimony, both Chambers and Hiss had denied having committed espionage. By introducing the Baltimore documents, Chambers admitted he had previously lied, opening both Hiss and himself to perjury charges. Chambers also gave a new date for his own break with the Communist Party, an important point in his accusations against Hiss. For over nine years, beginning September 1, 1939, he had claimed to have quit the Party in 1937. Chambers now began to claim the actual date was sometime in early March 1938, the year of the "Baltimore documents," before finally settling during the trial, on April 15, 1938.

On December 2, Chambers led HUAC investigators to a pumpkin patch on his Maryland farm; from a hollowed-out pumpkin in which he had hidden them the previous day, he produced five rolls of 35 mm film that he said came from Hiss in 1938, as well. While some of the film was undeveloped and some contained images of trivial content such as publicly available Navy documents concerning the painting of fire extinguishers, there were also images of State Department documents that were classified at the time. As a consequence of the revelation's dramatic staging, both the film and the Baltimore documents soon became known collectively as the "Pumpkin Papers."

== Perjury trials and conviction ==
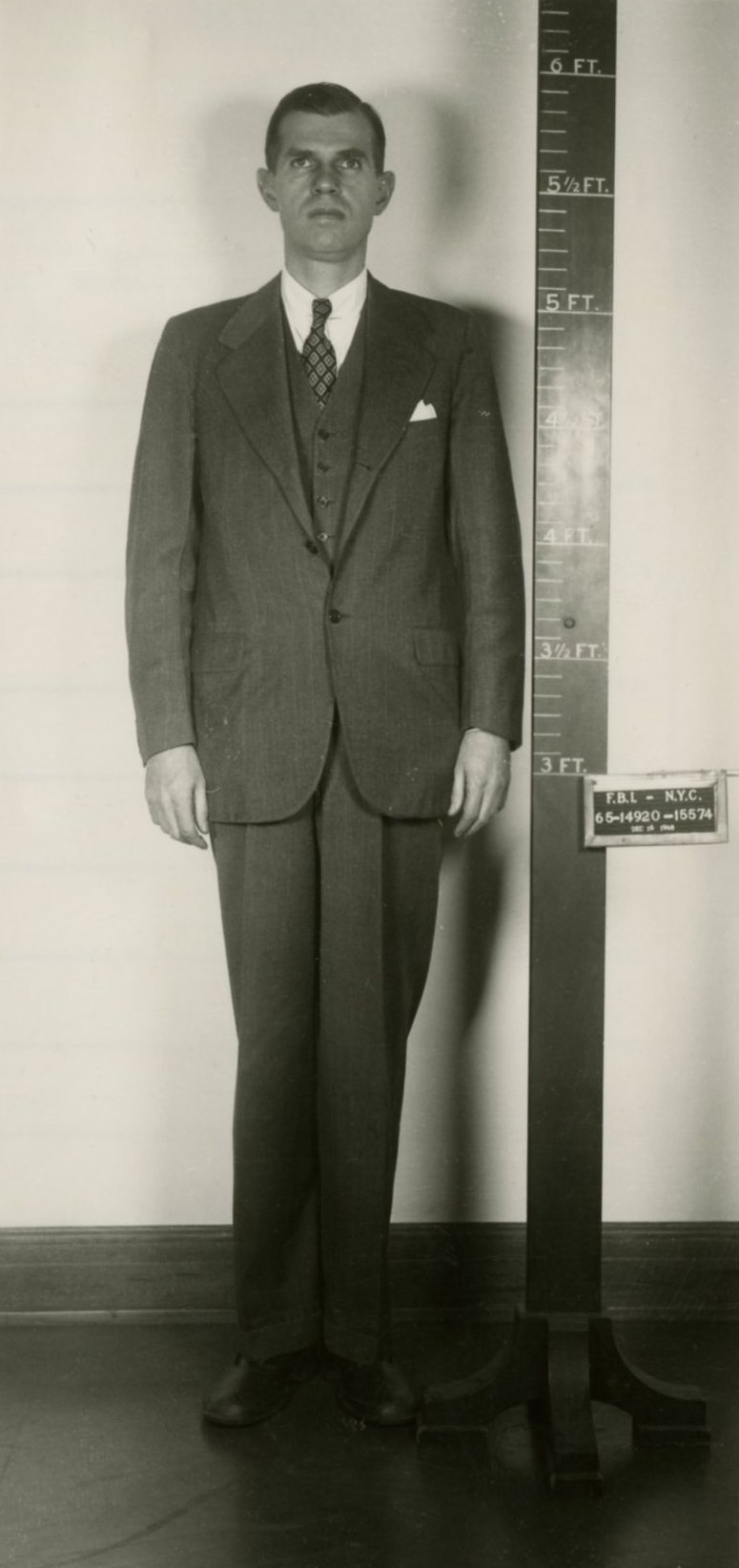
Hiss's FBI mugshot

The grand jury charged Hiss with two counts of perjury. He was not indicted for espionage since the period of limitations had run out. Chambers was never charged with a crime. Hiss went to trial twice. The first trial, presided over by Judge Samuel Kaufman, started on May 31, 1949, and ended in a hung jury on July 7. Chambers admitted on the witness stand that he had previously committed perjury several times while he was under oath, including deliberately falsifying key dates in his story. Hiss's character witnesses at his first trial included such notables as future Democratic presidential candidate Adlai Stevenson, Supreme Court Justices Felix Frankfurter and Stanley Reed, and former Democratic presidential candidate John W. Davis. President Truman famously called the investigation "a red herring." The second trial, presided over by Judge Henry W. Goddard, lasted from November 17, 1949, to January 21, 1950.

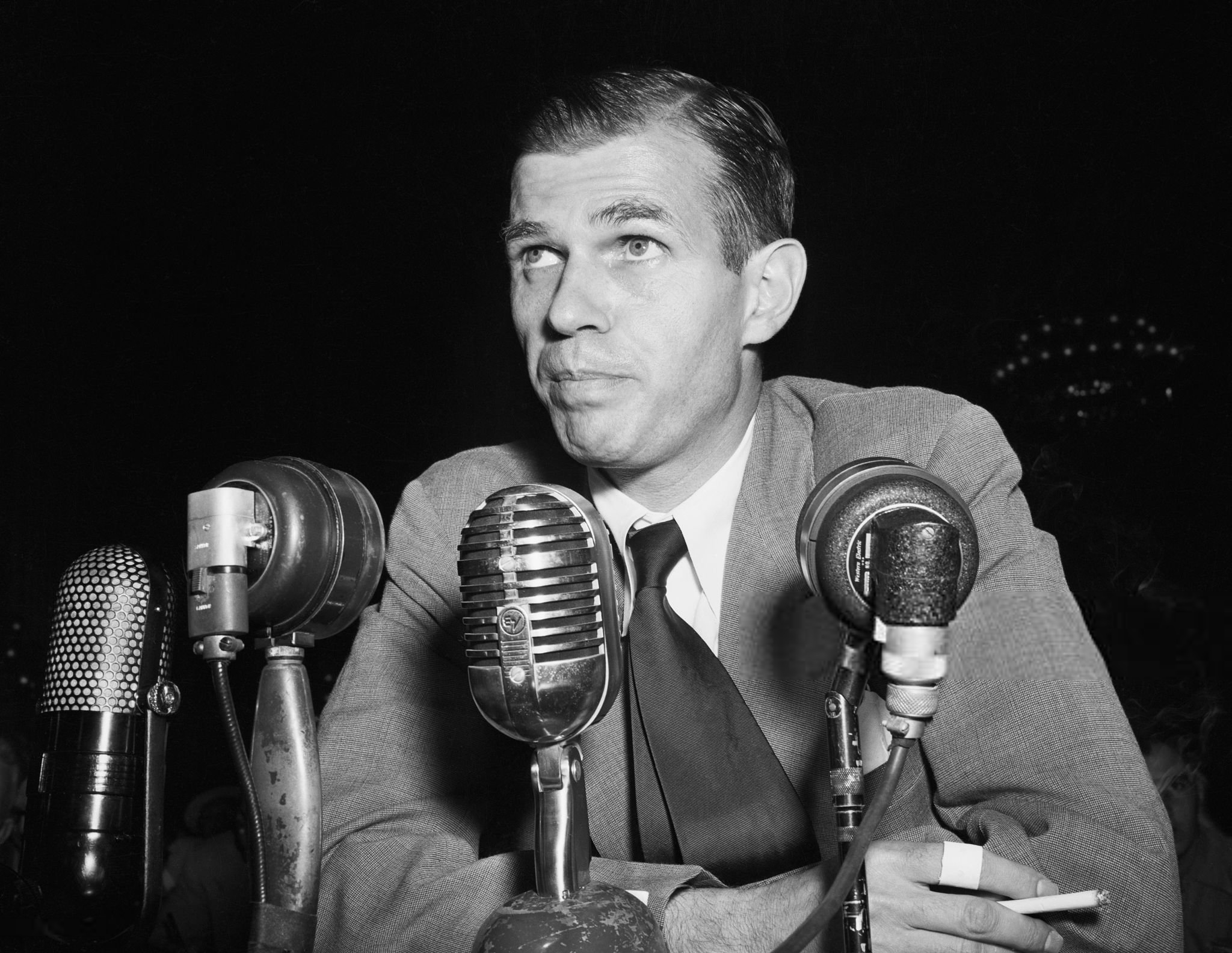
Hiss testifies before a federal grand jury, December 15, 1948

At both trials, a key to the prosecution's case was testimony from expert witnesses, stating that identifying characteristics of the typed Baltimore documents matched samples typed on a typewriter owned by the Hisses at the time of his alleged espionage work with Chambers. The prosecution also presented as evidence the typewriter itself. Given away years earlier, it had been located by defense investigators. This trial resulted in an eight-to-four deadlocked jury. "That, according to one of Hiss's friends and lawyers, Helen Buttenweiser, was the only time that she had ever seen Alger shocked—stunned by the fact that eight of his fellow citizens did not believe him."

In the second trial, Hede Massing, an Austria-born confessed Soviet spy who was being threatened with deportation, and whom the first judge had not permitted to testify, provided some slight corroboration of Chambers's story. She recounted meeting Hiss at a party in 1935. Massing also described how Hiss had tried to recruit Noel Field, another Soviet spy at State, to switch from Massing's ring to his own.

This time the jury found Hiss guilty. According to Anthony Summers, "Hiss spoke only two sentences in court after he had been found guilty. The first was to thank the judge. The second was to assert that one day in the future it would be disclosed how forgery by typewriter had been committed."

On January 25, 1950, Judge Goddard sentenced Hiss to five years' imprisonment on each of the two counts, to run concurrently.

At a subsequent press conference, Secretary of State Dean Acheson reacted emotionally, affirming, "I do not intend to turn my back on Alger Hiss." Acheson quoted Jesus in the Bible: "I was a Stranger and ye took me in; Naked, and ye clothed me; I was sick and ye visited me; I was in prison and ye came unto me." Acheson's remarks enraged Nixon, who called Acheson's words sacrilege. The verdict was upheld by the United States Court of Appeals for the Second Circuit, and the Supreme Court of the United States denied a writ of certiorari.

The case heightened public concern about Soviet espionage penetration of the US government in the 1930s and 1940s. As a well-educated and highly connected government official from an old American family, Alger Hiss did not fit the profile of a typical spy.

Publicity surrounding the case thrust Nixon into the public spotlight, helping him move from the U.S. House of Representatives to the U.S. Senate in 1950, to the vice-presidency of the United States in 1952, and finally to the presidency in 1968.

Senator Joseph McCarthy made his famous speech at Wheeling, West Virginia, two weeks after the Hiss verdict, launching his career as the nation's most visible anti-communist.

== Incarceration ==
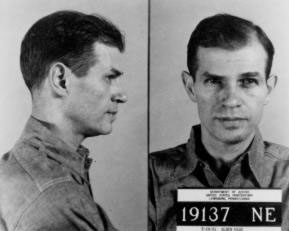
Hiss in United States Penitentiary, Lewisburg in Kelly Township, Pennsylvania

On March 22, 1951, Alger Hiss was sent to a maximum security federal facility. Although he had been sentenced to five years' imprisonment, Hiss served only three years and eight months in Lewisburg Federal Prison. He was released from prison on November 27, 1954.

While in prison, Hiss acted as a volunteer attorney, adviser, and tutor for many of his fellow inmates.

== Post-incarceration ==
After his release in 1954 at age 50, Hiss, who had been disbarred, worked as a salesman for a stationery company in New York City. From 1958 to 1960 he worked as an administrative assistant to R. Andrew Smith, a comb manufacturer, earning $20,000/year. In 1957, he published In the Court of Public Opinion, a book challenging in detail the prosecution's case against him, and maintaining the typewritten documents traced to his typewriter had been forged. Hiss separated from his first wife, Priscilla, in 1959, though they remained married until her death in 1984. In 1985 he married Isabel Johnson, who had been living with him since soon after they met in 1960.

On November 11, 1962, following Richard Nixon's failed 1962 bid for governor of California, Hiss appeared in a segment titled "The Political Obituary of Richard M. Nixon" on the Howard K. Smith: News and Comment show on ABC television. (The Chicago Tribune reported targets of Hiss's "invective" and whom he "denounced as conspirators in a monstrous plot to convict him on concocted evidence" included: the presiding judge at his second trial, the three appellate court judges who rejected his appeal, J. Edgar Hoover and the FBI, assistant attorney general Alexander M. Campbell, federal prosecutor Thomas F. Murphy, members of the New York grand jury who indicted him, jury members in his two trials who convicted him, and HUAC members and particularly Richard Nixon and Karl Mundt.") His appearance led sponsors to withdraw from Smith's program when viewers bombarded ABC with complaints about letting a convicted perjurer appear on the air. Smith's show was cancelled in June 1963.

The five rolls of 35 mm film known as the "pumpkin papers" had been characterized as highly classified and too sensitive to reveal and were thought until late 1974 to be locked in HUAC files. In 1975, independent researcher Stephen W. Salant, an economist at the University of Michigan, sued the US Justice Department when it denied his request for access to them under the Freedom of Information Act. On July 31, 1975, as a result of this lawsuit and follow-on suits filed by Peter Irons and by Alger Hiss and William A. Reuben, the Justice Department released copies of the "pumpkin papers" that had been used to implicate Hiss. One roll of film turned out to be totally blank due to overexposure, two others are faintly legible copies of non-classified Navy Department documents relating to such subjects as life rafts and fire extinguishers, and the remaining two are photographs of the State Department documents that had been introduced at the two Hiss trials. A few days after the release of the Pumpkin Papers, on August 5, 1975, Hiss was readmitted to the Massachusetts bar. The state's Supreme Judicial Court overruled its Committee of Bar Overseers and stated in a unanimous decision that, despite his conviction, Hiss had demonstrated the "moral and intellectual fitness" required to be an attorney. Hiss was the first lawyer ever readmitted to the Massachusetts bar after a major criminal conviction.

In 1988, Hiss wrote an autobiography, Recollections of a Life, in which he maintained his innocence. He fought his perjury conviction until his death from emphysema on November 15, 1996, at Lenox Hill Hospital in New York City, four days after his 92nd birthday.

== Personal life ==
In 1929, Hiss married Priscilla Fansler Hobson, a Bryn Mawr graduate and grade school teacher. Priscilla, previously married to Thayer Hobson, had a three-year-old son, Timothy Hobson (September 19, 1926 – January 8, 2018). Hiss and Priscilla had a son, Tony Hiss. The couple separated in 1959 after 30 years of marriage, five years after his incarceration.

In the 1960s, Hiss was introduced to Isabel (Dowden) Johnson, a model, freelance writer, and editor. Though Hiss asked Priscilla for a divorce so they could marry, she did not grant him one. Johnson had a previous relationship with Communist writer Howard Fast, recipient of the Stalin Peace Prize, and had briefly married Communist screenwriter Lester Cole, of the Hollywood Ten.

After Priscilla's death in 1984, Hiss and Johnson married in 1986. Hiss was an Episcopalian.

Hiss was conferred an honorary Doctor of Laws degree from Johns Hopkins University in 1947.

== Later evidence, for and against ==
=== Testimony by Bullitt and Weyl ===
In 1952, former U.S. Ambassador to France William C. Bullitt testified before the McCarran Committee (the Senate Internal Security Subcommittee) that in 1939, Premier Édouard Daladier had advised him of French intelligence reports that two State Department officials named Hiss were Soviet agents. When asked about it the next day, Daladier, then 68 years old, told reporters that he did not recall this conversation from 13 years previously. Also called to testify before the McCarran committee was economist Nathaniel Weyl, a former Communist Party member "at large" who had worked for the Department of Agriculture during the early days of the New Deal and had become disillusioned with what he considered the underhanded methods of the Communist Party. In 1950 Weyl had been interviewed by the FBI and had told them that in 1933 he had belonged to a secret Communist Party unit along with Harold Ware and Lee Pressman and confirmed that Alger Hiss had been present at some meetings held at Ware's sister's violin studio. In 1950, Weyl published an anti-communist book, Treason: The Story of Disloyalty and Betrayal in American History, that made no mention of the so-called "Ware Group" and expressed doubt that Hiss was guilty of espionage.

=== Forgery by typewriter hypothesis ===
At both trials, FBI typewriter experts testified that the Baltimore documents in Chambers's possession matched samples of typing done in the 1930s by Priscilla Hiss on the Hisses' home typewriter, a Woodstock brand. At both trials, the testimony was directed to comparing two sets of typed documents and not to the typewriter eventually submitted into evidence. As early as December 1948 the chief investigator for the Hiss defense, Horace W. Schmahl, set off a race to find Hiss's typewriter. The FBI, with superior resources, was also searching for the typewriter, which the Hiss family had discarded some years earlier. The Hiss legal team acquired a Woodstock typewriter, Woodstock serial no. 230099 which they believed at the time to be the Woodstock machine Hiss had owned in the 1930s and the Hiss defense introduced it with the intention of showing that its typeface would not be a match for that on the FBI's documents. After obtaining samples of typing done on the Hisses’ typewriter in the 1930s, the FBI’s chief document examiner, Ramos Feehan, testified before the grand jury that the same machine that typed the samples (later called the Hiss standards) also typed the Baltimore documents.

After Hiss had gone to prison, his lawyer, Chester T. Lane, acting on a tip he had received from someone who had worked with Schmahl that Hiss might have been framed, filed a motion in January 1952 for a new trial. Lane sought to show that forgery by typewriter was feasible, and that such forgery had occurred in the Hiss case and was responsible for the incriminating documents. Unaware that the feasibility of such forgeries had already been established throughout the war by the military intelligence services that engaged in such practices, the Hiss defense team sought to establish feasibility directly by hiring a civilian typewriter expert, Martin Tytell, to create a typewriter that would be indistinguishable from the one the Hisses owned. Tytell spent two years creating a facsimile Woodstock typewriter whose print characteristics would match the peculiarities of the Hiss typewriter.

To demonstrate that forgery by typewriter was not merely a theoretical possibility but had actually occurred in the Hiss case, the defense sought to show that Exhibit #UUU was not Hiss's old machine but a newer one altered to type like it. According to former Woodstock executives, the production date of a machine could be inferred from the machine's serial number. The serial number on the Exhibit #UUU typewriter indicated that it would have been manufactured after the man who sold the Hiss machine had retired from the company, and the salesman insisted that he did not sell any typewriters after his retirement. Decades later, when FBI files were disclosed under the Freedom of Information Act, it turned out that the FBI had also doubted that the trial exhibit was Hiss's machine and for exactly the same reasons; although the FBI expressed these concerns internally as the first trial was about to begin, the public did not learn about the FBI's doubts until the mid-1970s.

To explain why typing from Exhibit #UUU seemed indistinguishable from the typing on Hiss's old machine, Lane assembled experts prepared to testify that Exhibit #UUU had been tampered with in a way inconsistent with professional repair work to make it type like Hiss's old typewriter. In addition, experts were prepared to testify that Priscilla Hiss was not the typist of the Baltimore documents. In summarizing the conclusions of the forensic experts he had assembled in his motion for a new trial, Lane told the court, "I no longer just question the authenticity of Woodstock N230099. I now say to the Court that Woodstock N230099—the typewriter in evidence at the trials—is a fake machine. I present in affidavit form, and will be able to produce at the hearing, expert testimony that this machine is a deliberately fabricated job, a new type face on an old body. This being so, it can only have been planted on the defense by or on behalf of Whittaker Chambers as part of his plot for the false incrimination of Alger Hiss."

In July 1952 Judge Goddard denied Hiss's motion for a new trial, expressing great skepticism that Chambers had the resources, knew how to commit forgery by typewriter, and would have known where to plant such a fake machine so it would be found. In his decision, Goddard did not address the possibility, raised by Hiss's defenders, that someone other than Chambers, namely Horace Schmahl and/or his associates on the prosecution side, might have been involved in faking the typewriter.

In 1976, Hiss called ex-FBI official William C. Sullivan, who recounted in his 1979 memoir:

In 1976, five years after I left the FBI, I got a telephone call at my home in New Hampshire from Alger Hiss. Still working on his case, he wanted me to tell him whether the typewriter that helped convict him of a perjury charge was a fake which had been put together at the FBI Laboratory.
Although I never worked on the Hiss case myself, I knew that we were giving Richard Nixon, who was in charge of the investigation, every possible assistance. Had Nixon asked the FBI to manufacture evidence to provide his case against Hiss, Hoover would have been only too glad to oblige. I told Hiss that the typewriter was not made in the FBI Lab. What I didn't tell him was that even if we had wanted to, we simply wouldn't have been capable of it.

Based on Justice Department documents released in 1976, the Hiss defense filed a petition in federal court in July 1978 for a writ of coram nobis, asking that the guilty verdict be overturned due to prosecutorial misconduct. In 1982, the Federal Court denied the petition, and in 1983 the US Supreme Court declined to hear the appeal. In the writ, Hiss's attorneys argued the following:

- The FBI illegally withheld important evidence from the Hiss defense team, specifically that typewritten documents could be forged. Unbeknownst to the defense, military intelligence operatives in World War II, a decade before the trials, "could reproduce faultlessly the imprint of any typewriter on earth."
- With regard to the Woodstock No. 230099 typewriter introduced as Exhibit #UUU by the defense at the trial, the FBI knew there was an inconsistency between its serial number and the manufacture date of Hiss's machine but illegally withheld this information from Hiss.
- That the FBI had an informer on the Hiss defense team, a private detective named Horace W. Schmahl. Hired by the Hiss defense team, Schmahl reported on the Hiss defense strategy to the government.
- That the FBI had conducted illegal surveillance of Hiss before and during the trials, including phone taps and mail openings. Also that the prosecution had withheld from Hiss and his lawyers the records of this surveillance, none of which provided any evidence that Hiss was a spy or a communist.

Federal Judge Owen, in denying Hiss's coram nobis petition, quoted verbatim two points made by Judge Goddard in denying Hiss's appeal for a new trial 30 years earlier, namely, that "there is not a trace of any evidence that Chambers had the mechanical skills, tools, equipment or material for such a difficult task [as typewriter forgery]," and that "If Chambers had constructed a duplicate machine, how would he have known where to plant it so that it would be found by Hiss?"

Stephen Salant, whose FOIA requests had revealed to the public the contents of the "pumpkin papers," has documented that Schmahl was a trained Army "spy-catcher" (as they called themselves), a special agent in the Counter Intelligence Corps (CIC). While on the payroll of the Hiss defense and searching for Hiss's typewriter, Schmahl confided to the FBI that his "present employment" in December 1948 was with Military Intelligence; his claim has not yet been independently verified. At the Military Intelligence Training Center, CIC agents learned the rudiments of forgery and how to detect it through matching of typed samples with the typewriter that produced them. During the 1940s the CIC's domestic surveillance of civilians was extensive but so covert that it usually escaped notice. When detected, undercover CIC agents were often mistaken for FBI agents, since only the Bureau was authorized to investigate civilians. During the 1930s Army counterintelligence monitored another suspected communist connected to Chambers, Franklin Vincent Reno, a civilian employed at the Aberdeen Proving Ground, who shortly afterwards passed information about US Army weapons to Chambers. It is not known if US Army counterintelligence monitored Chambers' other associates, but when Hiss presided over the UN Charter Conference, more than a hundred undercover CIC agents were in attendance.

In his 1976 memoir, former White House counsel John Dean states that President Nixon's chief counsel Charles Colson told him that Nixon had admitted in a conversation that HUAC had fabricated a typewriter, saying, "We built one on the Hiss case." According to Anthony Summers: "When Dean's book was published, Colson protested that he had 'no recollection of Nixon's having said the typewriter was 'phonied.'" Nixon called the claim "totally false." Dean insisted that his contemporaneous notes confirmed that Colson had quoted the President as he indicated and seemed serious when he did so.

Cold War historian John V. Fleming disagrees, arguing that on the White House tapes Nixon never says anything that would have corroborated Colson's statement to John Dean about forging a typewriter in the Hiss case. Fleming and others maintain that the indistinct phrase during a conversation with John Dean that sounded to certain transcribers like "we made a typewriter" is actually a reference to Hiss's legal team. Throughout the tapes Nixon stresses how he had tried Hiss in the press, not the law courts, because that's how these things were done:

We won the Hiss case in the papers. We did. I had to leak stuff all over the place. Because the Justice Department would not prosecute it. Hoover didn't even cooperate.... It was won in the papers. I leaked out the papers.... I leaked out the testimony. I had Hiss convicted before he ever got to the grand jury.... Go back and read the chapter on the Hiss case in Six Crises and you'll see how it was done. It wasn't done waiting for the goddamn courts or the attorney general or the FBI.

According to Anthony Summers:

The one substantive piece of information indicating typewriter forgery features the OSS and its chief, William Donovan. In late 1948, when the Hiss defense and the FBI began hunting for the Woodstock typewriter, a man named Horace Schmahl joined the defense team as an investigator. Schmahl had worked for either the OSS or army intelligence during the war, then joined the Central Intelligence Group, which operated between the closedown of the OSS and the inception of the CIA. After his stint for the Hiss side, Schmahl defected to the prosecution team.

Against the forged typewriter theory Allen Weinstein writes:

[I]f there existed any persons with the means, motive, and opportunity to "substitute" a different Woodstock for the Hiss machine in the months after Hiss's indictment, the evidence ... indicates the possible conspirators, Mike Catlett and Donald Hiss, who for two months withheld knowledge from Alger's lawyers that the typewriter had been traced to Ira Lockey.

In 2025, Jeff Kisseloff suggested a possible conspiracy involving a "planted" typewriter involving Horace Schmahl, who had by that time been fired by the Hiss defense team and who had been secretly working for the FBI, Ben Mandel, a stridently anti-communist state department employee, and Don Levine, a Russian émigré known for his fierce anti-Stalinism. Mandel and Levine had been working together on various anti-communist projects since they first met in 1936, and from that time, according to Kisseloff, "They began their own campaign to push Hiss out of the government. By 1948, either working on their own or together, they had been attempting to destroy Hiss’s government career for more than a decade." Hiss had given the typewriter in the 1930s to the Catlett family, who subsequently gave it to Ira Lockey. When Mike Catlett and Donald Hiss first went to see Lockey, he claimed to have junked the typewriter. Six weeks later however Lockey contacted Hiss' lawyers to say that he did have the typewriter and gave it to them. Kisseloff suggests that Mandel, Levine and Schmahl may have given a "forged" typewriter to Lockey to give to the Hiss team which they knew would tend to incriminate Hiss.

=== Noel Field ===
In 1992, records were found in Hungarian Interior Ministry archives in which self-confessed Soviet spy Noel Field named Alger Hiss as a fellow agent. An American citizen from a Quaker family who had grown up in Switzerland, Field attended Harvard and worked in the US Foreign Service from 1929 until 1936, when he left the State Department for a job at the League of Nations in Geneva, helping refugees from the Spanish Civil War. During World War II, Field, who never concealed he was a communist, headed a Unitarian Universalist Service Committee organization to aid displaced persons in Marseilles, before fleeing to Geneva, where he collaborated with Allen Dulles of the OSS (who was based in Bern). In 1948, when the Hiss trials started, Field and his German wife were still living in Switzerland. By 1949 Field was broke, having been fired from the US-based Unitarian Service Committee for his communist associations. Wishing to avoid returning to the United States and possibly having to testify before Congress, Field traveled to Prague, hoping to be hired as a lecturer at the Charles University. Instead, he was seized by Stalinist security services from Poland and Czechoslovakia and secretly imprisoned in Hungary. Field was accused of having organized an anti-communist resistance network in Eastern Europe for the OSS during the war and later for the new CIA and was held for five years in solitary confinement. Repeatedly interrogated under rigorous torture, Field broke down and confessed to being "head of the U.S. Secret Service," under his controller, Allen Dulles, "the famous pro-Nazi OSS spymaster."

While being "rehabilitated" after the torture had ceased, Field referred four times to Hiss as a Soviet agent, for example: "Around the summer of 1935 Alger Hiss tried to induce me to do service for the Soviets. I was indiscreet enough to tell him he had come too late." This agreed with Hede Massing's assertion to US authorities in 1947 that when she attempted to recruit Noel Field for one Soviet spy network (the OGPU), Field had replied that he already worked for another (the GRU). (Massing repeated this story at Hiss's second trial when she testified that at a party at Noel Field's house in 1935 she had obliquely joked with Hiss about recruiting Noel Field.) In 1954, the Hungarian secret police released Field, exonerating him. He then formally wrote to the Communist Party's Central Committee in Moscow stating for the record that the tortures he had undergone in captivity had made him "confess more and more lies as truth." Hiss's defenders argue that Field's implications of Hiss may well have been among those lies. Field remained in communist Hungary until his death in 1970. In public, Field continued to maintain Hiss was innocent and, in 1957, wrote Hiss a letter calling Hede Massing's dinner party story "the false testimony of a perjured witness" and an "outrageous lie."

=== Venona and "ALES" ===
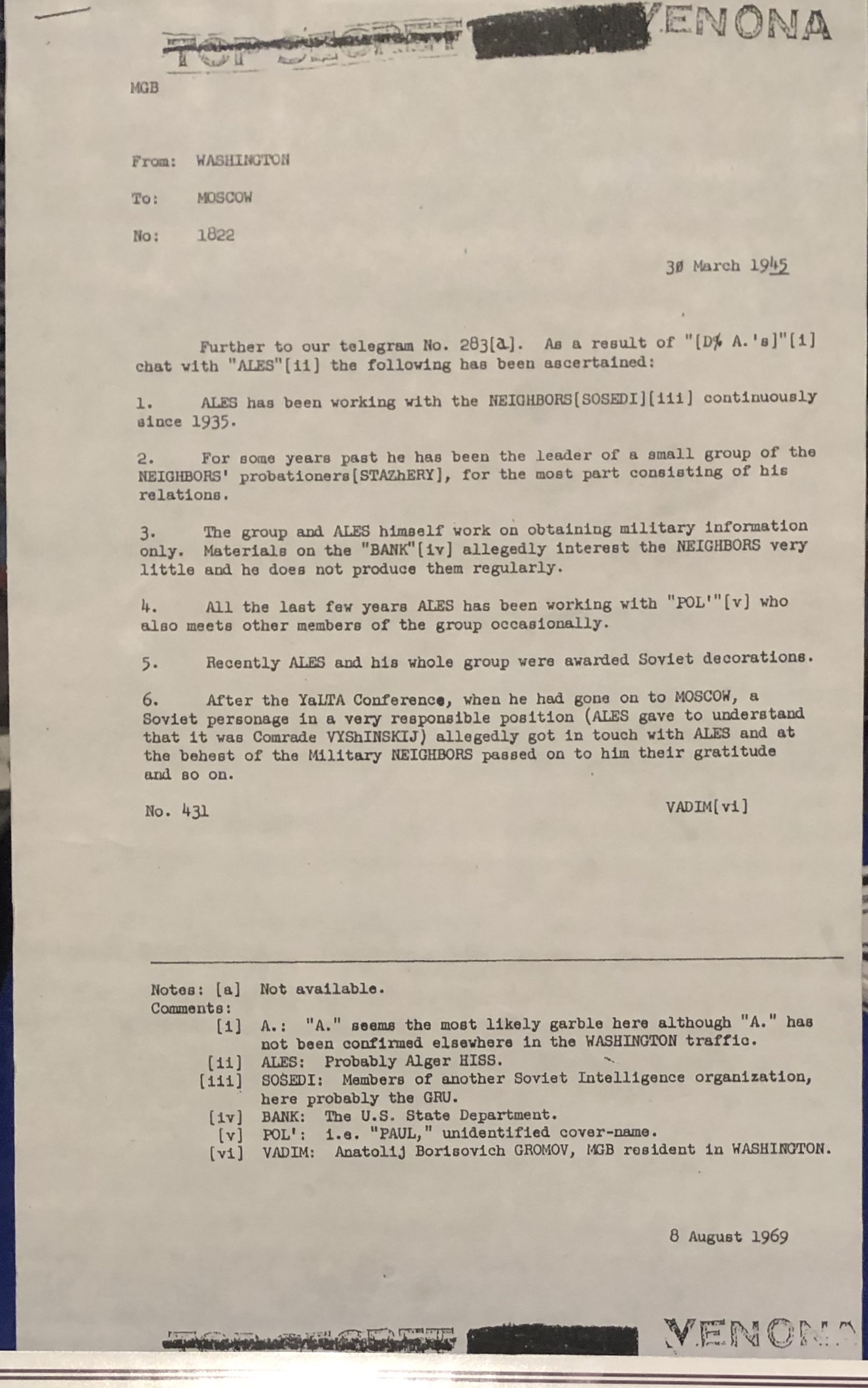
The VENONA decrypt allegedly concerning Hiss, 1945

In 1995, the CIA and the NSA for the first time confirmed the existence of the World War II Venona project, which, beginning in 1943, had decrypted or partially decrypted thousands of telegrams sent from 1940 to 1948 to the primary Soviet foreign intelligence agency—for most of that period, the NKVD—by its operatives in the US and elsewhere. Although known to the FBI, Venona had been kept secret even from President Truman. One cable, Venona #1822, mentioned a Soviet spy codenamed "ALES" who worked with a group of "Neighbors" — members of other Soviet intelligence organizations, such as the military's GRU. FBI Special Agent Robert J. Lamphere, who supervised the FBI's spy chasing squad, concluded that the codename "ALES" was "probably Alger Hiss."

In 1997, Allen Weinstein, in the second edition of his 1978 book Perjury: The Hiss-Chambers Case, calls the Venona evidence "persuasive but not conclusive." The bipartisan Moynihan Commission on Government Secrecy, chaired by Democratic Senator Daniel Patrick Moynihan, stated in its findings that year: "The complicity of Alger Hiss of the State Department seems settled. As does that of Harry Dexter White of the Treasury Department." In his 1998 book Secrecy: The American Experience, Moynihan wrote, "Belief in the guilt or innocence of Alger Hiss became a defining issue in American intellectual life. Parts of the American government had conclusive evidence of his guilt, but they never told." In their numerous books, Harvey Klehr, professor of political science at Emory University, and John Earl Haynes, historian of twentieth-century politics at the Library of Congress, have mounted an energetic defense of Lamphere's conclusion that ALES indeed referred to Alger Hiss. National Security Agency analysts have also gone on record asserting that ALES could only have been Alger Hiss. The Venona transcript # 1822, sent March 30, 1945, from the Soviets' Washington station chief to Moscow, appears to indicate that ALES attended the February 4–11, 1945, Yalta conference and then went to Moscow. Hiss did attend Yalta and then traveled to Moscow with Secretary of State Stettinius.

While some historians and researchers have concluded that Venona #1822 constitutes definitive proof that ALES was Hiss, others have disagreed. Hiss's lawyer, John Lowenthal argued:

- ALES was said to be the leader of a small group of espionage agents but, apart from using his wife as a typist and Chambers as courier, Hiss was alleged by the prosecution to have acted alone. The CIA concluded the "small group" comprised Alger, his wife Priscilla, and brother Donald.
- ALES was a GRU (military intelligence) agent who obtained military intelligence and only rarely provided State Department material. In contrast, during his trial, Hiss, an employee of the State Department, was accused of having obtained only non-military information, and the papers he was accused of having passed to the Soviets on a regular basis were non-military, State Department documents.
- Even had Hiss been a spy as alleged, after 1938 he would have been unlikely to have continued espionage activities as ALES did, since in 1938 Whittaker Chambers had broken with the Communist Party and gone into hiding, threatening to denounce his Communist Party colleagues unless they followed suit. Had Hiss been ALES, his cover would thus have been in extreme jeopardy, and it would have been too risky for any Soviet agency to continue using him.
- Lowenthal suggests that ALES was not at the Yalta conference at all and that the cable instead was directed to Soviet deputy foreign minister Andrey Vyshinsky. According to Lowenthal, in paragraph six of Venona #1822, the GRU asks Vyshinsky to get in touch with ALES to convey thanks from the GRU for a job well done—which would have been unnecessary if ALES had actually gone to Moscow, because the GRU could have thanked him there in person.

Eduard Mark of the Center for Air Force History hotly disputed this analysis. In 2005, the NSA released the original Russian of the Venona texts. At a symposium held at the Center for Cryptologic History that year, intelligence historian John R. Schindler concluded that the Russian text of Venona #1822 made clear that ALES was indeed at Yalta: "the identification of ALES as Alger Hiss, made by the U.S. Government more than a half-century ago, seems exceptionally solid, based on the evidence now available; message 1822 is only one piece of that evidence, yet a compelling one."

Rebutting Lowenthal's other points, John Earl Haynes and Harvey Klehr argued that:

- None of the evidence presented at the Hiss trial precludes the possibility that Hiss could have been an espionage agent after 1938 or that he had only passed State Department documents after 1938.
- Chambers's charges were not seriously investigated until 1945 when Elizabeth Bentley defected, so the Soviets could in theory have considered it an acceptable risk for him to continue his espionage work even after Chambers's 1938 defection.
- Vyshinsky was not in the US between Yalta and the time of the Venona message, and the message is from the Washington KGB station reporting on a talk with ALES in the US, rendering Lowenthal's analysis impossible.

An earlier Venona document, #1579, had actually mentioned "HISS" by name. This partially decrypted cable consists of fragments of a 1943 message from the GRU chief in New York to headquarters in Moscow and reads: "from the State Department by name of HISS" (with "HISS" "spelled out in the Latin alphabet," according to a footnote by the cryptanalysts). "HISS" could refer either to Alger or Donald Hiss, both State Department officials at that time. Lowenthal argued that had Alger Hiss really been a spy, the GRU would not have mentioned his real name in a coded transmission, since this was contrary to their usual practice.

At an April 2007 symposium, authors Kai Bird and Svetlana Chervonnaya postulated that, based on the movements of officials present at Yalta, Wilder Foote, a US diplomat, not Hiss, was the best match for ALES. They note Foote was in Mexico City when a Soviet cable placed ALES there, whereas Hiss had left several days earlier for Washington (see above). In response, Haynes and Klehr point out that Foote doesn't fit other aspects of the description of ALES (Foote was publishing newspapers in Vermont at the time when ALES was said to have been working for Soviet military intelligence) and suggest that the cable came from someone who managed KGB assets (rather than GRU assets like ALES) and may have been mistaken when he stated that ALES was still in Mexico City. Mark also disputes that Foote was ALES, arguing that Foote was never shown to be associated with the communists or any foreign intelligence services; Hiss was the "one possible candidate" who could have been ALES, Mark contends.

=== Oleg Gordievsky ===
In 1985, a high-ranking KGB agent, Oleg Gordievsky (b. 1938), who was recruited in 1974 as a British double agent, defected and wrote a series of memoirs, in one of which, The KGB (1990), he recalled attending a lecture given before a KGB audience by Iskhak Abdulovich Akhmerov, who identified Hiss as a World War II Soviet agent. Gordievsky went further and claimed that Hiss had the codename identity of "ALES." Appearing before the Venona cables were made public, this at first appeared to be independent corroboration of the codename, but it was later revealed that Gordievsky's source for the ALES identity was an article by journalist Thomas Powell, who had seen National Security Agency documents on Venona years before their release. Gordievsky's status as a reliable source was challenged in sections of the British media.

=== Soviet archives ===
After the dissolution of the Soviet Union in 1991, Alger Hiss petitioned General Dmitry Antonovich Volkogonov, who had become Russian president Boris Yeltsin's military advisor and the overseer of all the Soviet intelligence archives, to request the release of any Soviet files relevant to his case. Both former President Nixon and the director of his presidential library, John H. Taylor, wrote similar letters, though their full contents are not yet publicly available.

Russian archivists responded by reviewing their files, and in late 1992 reported back that they had found no evidence Hiss ever engaged in espionage for the Soviet Union nor that he was a member of the Communist Party. Volkogonov subsequently stated he spent only two days on the search and had mainly relied on the word of KGB archivists. "What I saw gave me no basis to claim a full clarification," he said. Referring to Hiss's lawyer, he added, "John Lowenthal pushed me to say things of which I was not fully convinced." General-Lieutenant Vitaly Pavlov, who ran Soviet intelligence work in North America in the late 1930s and early 1940s for the NKVD said that Hiss never worked for the USSR as one of his agents.

In 2003, retired Russian intelligence official General Julius Kobyakov disclosed that it was he who had actually searched the files for Volkogonov. Kobyakov stated that Hiss did not have a relationship with SVR predecessor organizations, although Hiss was accused of being with the GRU, a military intelligence organization separate from SVR predecessors. In 2007, Svetlana Chervonnaya, a Russian researcher who had been studying Soviet archives since the early 1990s, argued that based on documents she reviewed, Hiss was not implicated in spying. In May 2009, at a conference hosted by the Wilson Center, Mark Kramer, director of Cold War Studies at Harvard University at the John F. Kennedy School of Government, stated that he did not "trust a word [Kobyakov] says," At the same conference, historian Ronald Radosh reported that while researching the papers of Marshal Voroshilov in Moscow, he and Mary Habeck had encountered two GRU (Soviet military intelligence) files referring to Alger Hiss as "our agent."

In 2009, Haynes, Klehr, and Alexander Vassiliev published Spies: The Rise and Fall of the KGB in America, based on KGB documents reportedly hand-copied by Vassiliev, a former KGB agent, during the 1990s. The authors attempted to show definitively that Alger Hiss had indeed been a Soviet spy and argue that KGB documents prove not only that Hiss was the elusive ALES, but that he also went by the codenames "Jurist" and "Leonard" while working for the GRU. Some documentation brought back by Vassiliev also refers to Hiss by his actual name, leaving no room, in the authors' opinion, for doubt about his guilt. Calling this the "massive weight of accumulated evidence," Haynes and Klehr conclude, "to serious students of history continued claims for Hiss's innocence are akin to a terminal case of ideological blindness." In a review published in the Journal of Cold War Studies, military historian Eduard Mark heartily concurred, stating that the documents "conclusively show that Hiss was, as Whittaker Chambers charged more than six decades ago, an agent of Soviet military intelligence (GRU) in the 1930s." Newsweek magazine reported that Civil Rights Movement historian David Garrow also concluded that, in his opinion, Spies "provides irrefutable confirmation of [Hiss's] guilt."

Other historians, such as D. D. Guttenplan, Jeff Kisseloff, and Amy Knight, assert that Spies' conclusions were not borne out by the evidence and accused its authors of engaging in "shoddy" research. Haynes responded to Knight on his website. Guttenplan stresses that Haynes and Klehr never saw and cannot even prove the existence of the documents that supposedly convict Hiss and others of espionage, but rather relied exclusively on handwritten notebooks authored by Vassiliev during the time he was given access to the Soviet archives in the 1990s while he collaborated with Weinstein. According to Guttenplan, Vassiliev could never explain how he managed, despite being required to leave his files and notebooks in a safe at the KGB press office at the end of each day, to smuggle out the notebooks with his extensive transcriptions of documents. Haynes and Klehr responded that the material was examined by historians, archivists, and intelligence professionals who unanimously agreed that the material was genuine.

Guttenplan also suggested, moreover, that Vassiliev might have omitted relevant facts and selectively replaced cover names with his own notion of the real names of various persons. According to Guttenplan, Boris Labusov, a press officer of the SVR, the successor to the KGB, has stated that Vassiliev could not in the course of his research have possibly "met the name of Alger Hiss in the context of some cooperation with some special services of the Soviet Union." Guttenplan also points out that Vasiliev admitted under oath in 2003 that he'd never seen a single document linking Hiss with the cover name "Ales." Haynes and Klehr also cite a 1950 memo indicating that a GRU agent, described as a senior State Department official, had recently been convicted in an American court. "The only senior American diplomat convicted of an espionage-related crime in 1950 was Alger Hiss."

Historian Jeff Kisseloff questions Haynes and Klehr's conclusion that Vassiliev's notes support Hede Massing's story about talking to Hiss at a party in 1935 about recruiting their mutual friend and host Noel Field into the communist underground. According to Kisseloff, "all that the files Vassiliev saw really indicate is that she was telling yet another version of her story in the 1930s. Haynes and Klehr never consider that, as an agent in Washington, DC, who was having little success in the tasks assigned to her, she may have felt pressure back then to make up a few triumphs to reassure her superiors." Kisseloff also disputes Haynes and Klehr's linking of Hiss with former Treasury Department official Harold Glasser, who they allege was a Soviet agent. Finally, Kisseloff states that some of the evidence compiled by Haynes and Klehr actually tends to exonerate rather than convict Hiss. For example, their book cites a KGB report from 1938 in which Iskhak Akhmerov, New York station chief, writes, "I don't know for sure who Hiss is connected with." Haynes and Klehr also claim that Hiss was the agent who used the cover name "Doctor." According to some Soviet sources, "Doctor" was a middle-aged Bessarabian Jew who was educated in Vienna.

Other historians felt that Haynes and Klehr's information was suspect because their publisher, Crown (a division of Random House), obtained temporary and limited access to KGB files through a payment of money (amount unspecified) to a pension fund for retired KGB agents, of whom Vassiliev was one, as was KGB archivist Volkogonov. Other historians had not been permitted to verify Vassiliev's data. In 2002, Vassiliev sued John Lowenthal for libel in a British court of law for publishing a journal article questioning his conclusions. Vassiliev lost the case before a jury and was further reprimanded by The Times for trying to exert a "chilling effect" on scholarship by resorting to the law courts. Vassiliev has since also unsuccessfully sued Amazon for publishing a customer review critical of his work.

In 1978, Victor Navasky interviewed six people Weinstein had quoted in his book Perjury, who all claimed to have been misquoted by Weinstein. One, Sam Krieger, won a cash payment from Weinstein, who issued an apology and promised to correct future editions of his book and to release his interview transcripts, which he subsequently failed to do.

== See also ==
- List of law clerks for the second seat of the Supreme Court of the United States
- Priscilla Hiss
- Donald Hiss
- John Abt
- Elizabeth Bentley
- Whittaker Chambers
- Noel Field
- Harold Glasser
- John Herrmann
- Victor Perlo
- J. Peters
- Ward Pigman
- Lee Pressman
- Vincent Reno
- Julian Wadleigh
- Harold Ware
- Nathaniel Weyl
- Harry Dexter White
- Nathan Witt
