= Perjury (disambiguation) =

Perjury is the intentional act of swearing a false oath or falsifying an affirmation to tell the truth.

Perjury may also refer to:

- Perjury (1921 film) starring William Farnum
- Perjury (film), 1929 German film
- Perjury: The Hiss–Chambers Case, 1978 book by Allen Weinstein
