= Priscilla Hiss =

American wife of Alger Hiss (1903–1984)

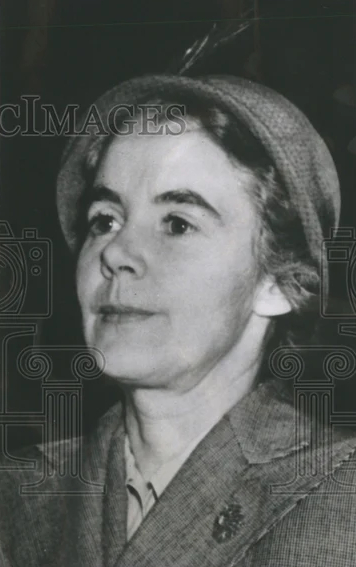
- Hiss in 1954
- Born: Priscilla Harriet Fansler; October 13, 1903; Evanston, Illinois, U.S.
- Died: October 14, 1984 (aged 81); New York City, U.S.
- Education: Bryn Mawr College (BA); Yale University (MA)
- Occupations: Art teacher; Book editor
- Political party: Socialist, alleged Communist, later Village Independent Democrats
- Spouses: Thayer Hobson (m. 1925; div. 1927) Alger Hiss (m. 1929)
- Children: Timothy Hobson, Tony Hiss
- Parent(s): Thomas Lafayette Fansler, Willa Roland Spruill

Priscilla Hiss (October 13, 1903 – October 14, 1984), born Priscilla Fansler and first married as Priscilla Hobson, was a 20th-century American teacher and book editor, best known as the wife of Alger Hiss, an alleged Communist and former State Department official whose innocence she supported with testimony throughout his two, highly publicized criminal trials in 1949.

== Background ==
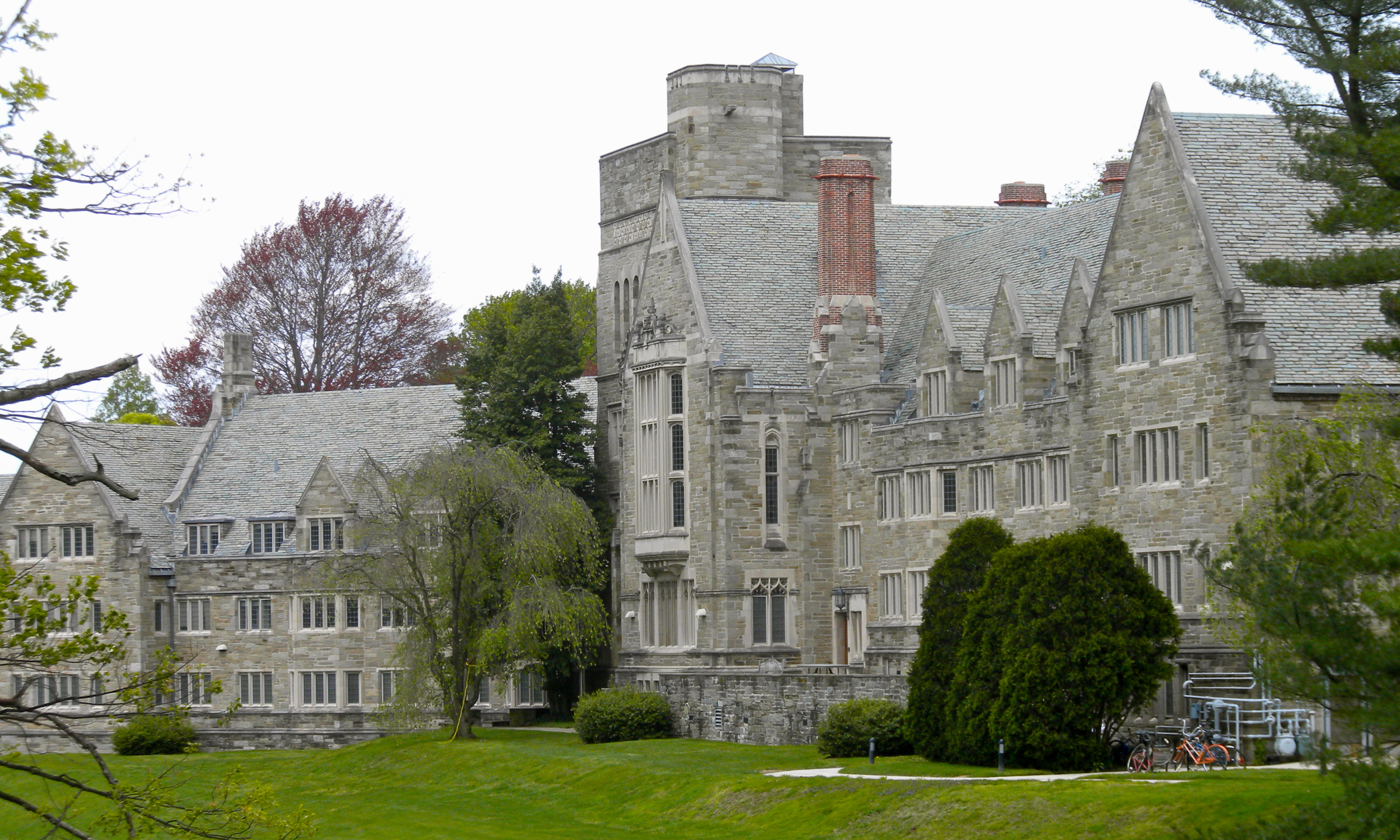
Hiss attended Bryn Mawr College' (here, Rhoads Hall)

Priscilla Harriet Fansler was born on October 13, 1903, in Evanston, Illinois. Her father was Thomas Lafayette Fansler and mother Willia Roland Spruill. She had two older brothers Dean Fansler (a teacher of English at Columbia University and acquaintance of Mortimer J. Adler, a classmate of Whittaker Chambers) and Henry Fansler (who as the Hiss Case began had moved recently to Preston, Maryland, and whom the FBI reported was a "something of a drunkard"). In 1924, she graduated cum laude from Bryn Mawr College. Her roommate Roberta Murray (of Murray Hill, Manhattan) became for a time her sister-in-law as Roberta Fansler. Later, she obtained an MA in English literature from Yale University.

== Career ==
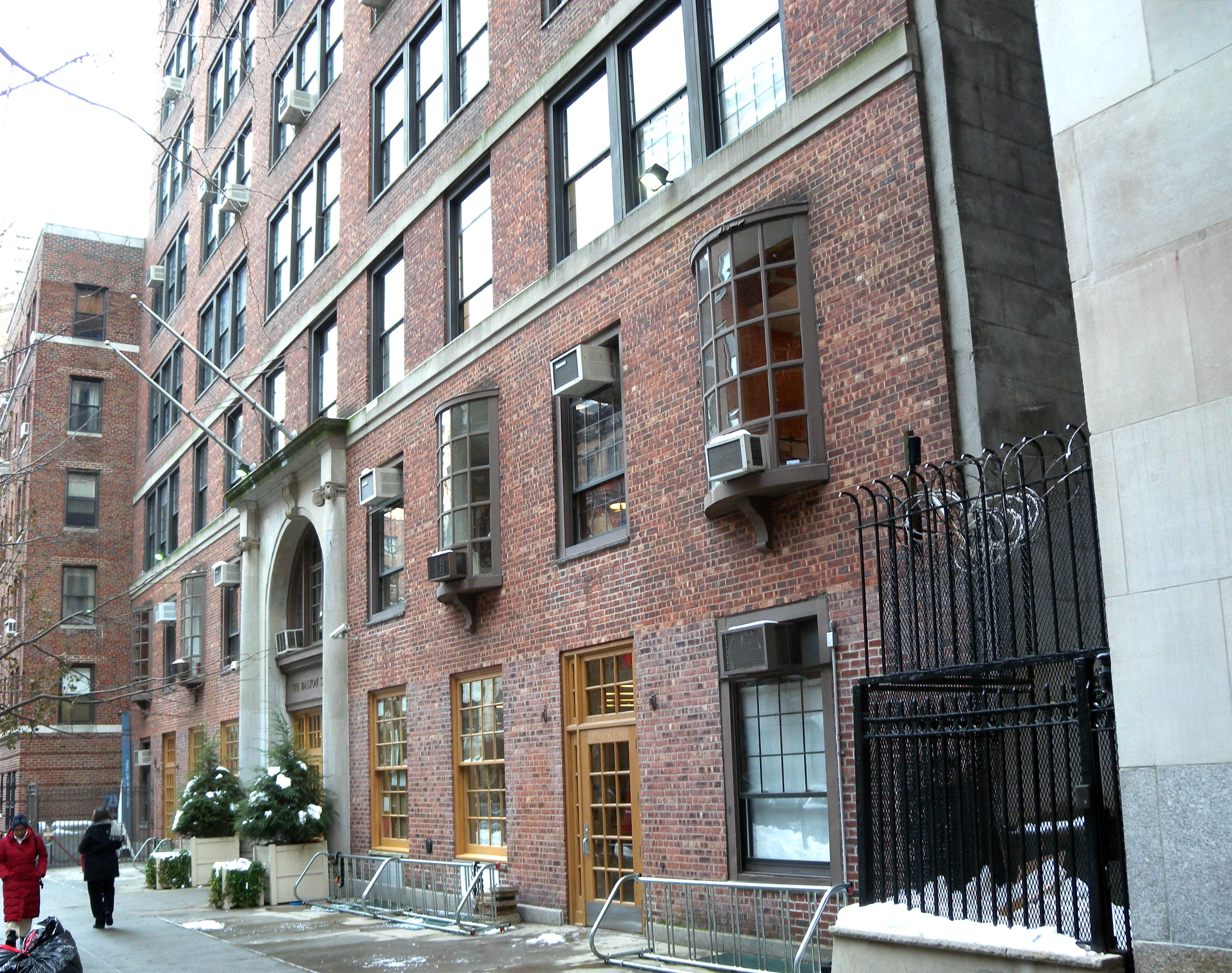
Hiss taught at the Dalton School (here, main building for grades 4-12, nicknamed "Big Dalton")

In the mid-1920s, Priscilla Hiss was working as an "office manager" at TIME magazine. When the Hiss family moved to Washington, DC (where her husband, Alger Hiss, would join the New Deal government), she taught English at the Potomac School.

For 1933–1934 and 1934–1935, her Bryn Mawr alumni records show that she engaged in "Research": for 1935–1936, her occupation is blank.

When they moved back to Manhattan in 1947, she worked the Dalton School, as the alumni record confirms.

After her husband, Alger, was convicted and imprisoned in the early 1950s, she worked in a bookstore and then as a book editor for publishing houses. In 1966, her alumni details show her working as copy editor for Harcourt, Brace & World. In 1972, she was a senior editor for the Golden Press children's imprint of the Western Publishing Company.

Later in life, she worked with Manhattan Community Board 2 in Greenwich Village, Village Independent Democrats, and the Democratic County Committee of New York County.

== Hiss Case ==
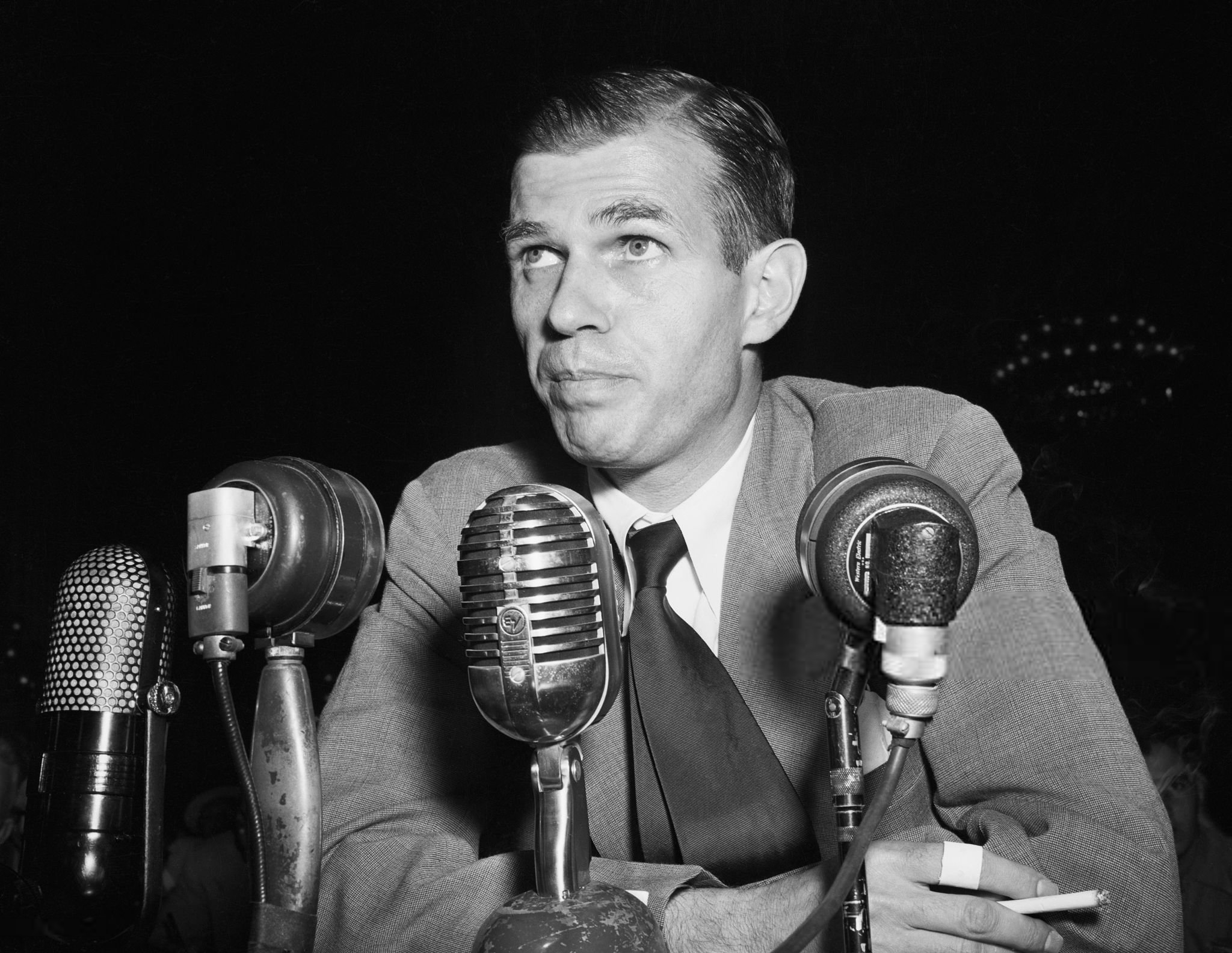
Hiss's second husband was Alger Hiss (here, 1948)

During two criminal trials against Alger Hiss, Priscilla Hiss defended her husband with her own testimony. There were two principal areas of interest in her testimony. First, had she typed documents found in the "Baltimore Documents" (scores of typewritten documents plus several documents handwritten by Hiss and Harry Dexter White)? Second, had she, like her husband, met with Whittaker Chambers (the Federal prosecutor's principal witness) after January 1, 1937? She denied both allegations.

Before any trials proceedings began, Alger Hiss's lifelong friend and attorney William L. Marbury Jr. interviewed the two:

I warned both Alger and Priscilla that if there were any skeletons in the closet of either one of them, they would certainly be discovered if suit were filed, and they both assured me there was no cause for worry on that count. However, I found my interview with Priscilla somewhat mystifying. I had asked to see her alone after Alger had left for the office, and we talked for nearly an hour. I got the impression that she felt that in some way she was responsible for the troubles which had come to Alger. However, she stoutly supported Alger's story of his association with "George Crosley" and flatly denied that either she or Alger had ever been connected with a Communist Party apparatus.

At both trials, FBI typewriter experts testified that the Baltimore Documents from Chambers's matched samples typed in the 1930s by Priscilla Hiss on a Woodstock model number N23009 typewriter that the Hiss family had owned. On March 17, 1978, The New York Times published a letter from her:

Miscarriage of Justice
To the Editor:
For more than a quarter of a century, I have kept silence amid the clamor concerning the conviction of Alger Hiss. Recently, statements have appeared in print to the effect that I have made remarks indicating that Alger Hiss was guilty. I fear that if I do not now speak out, my silence will be Interpreted as confirming these statements.
At all times. and with my every fiber, I have believed in the innocence of Alger Hiss. I have never spoken a word to the contrary. To me the conviction of Alger Hiss represents a cruel miscarriage of justice.
I do not intend to make any further statements concerning this painful subject.
PRISCILLA HISS
New York, March 10, 1978

(The letter preceded by just a few days the publication of Allen Weinstein's definitive book Perjury: The Hiss-Chambers Case.)

== Personal life and death ==
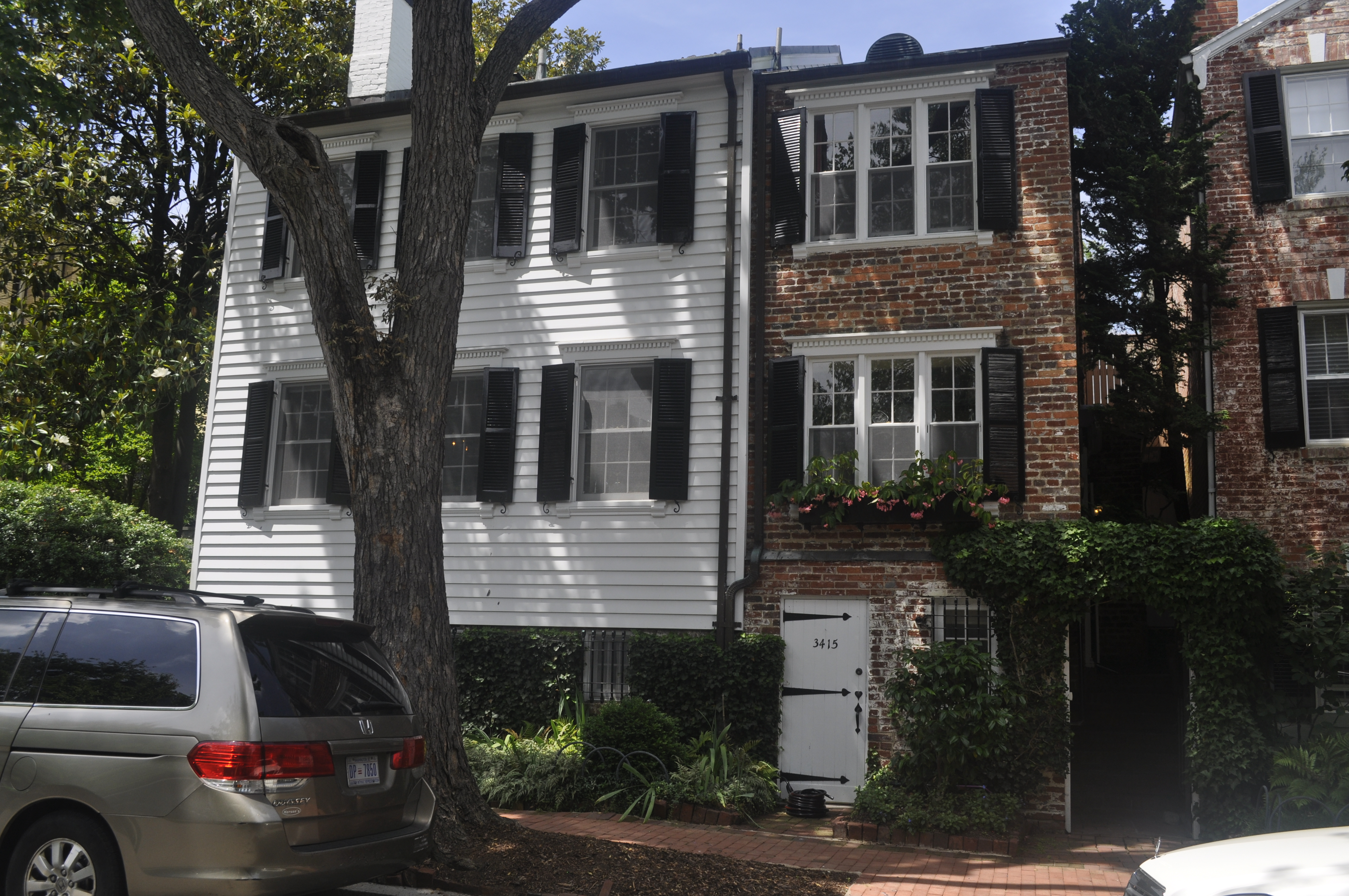
Hiss residence 3415 Volta Place in Georgetown, Washington, D.C. (2019)

In 1925, Priscilla Fansler married Thayer Hobson, a New York book publisher (who bought William Morrow and Company when Morrow himself died). In 1926, they had one son, Timothy Hobson. In 1927, they divorced; her alumni records show her "divorced" in 1928.

In 1929, she had an affair with William Brown Meloney V, became pregnant with his child, and underwent an abortion. Priscilla, who had met Alger Hiss first when he was 19 and she 20, married Hiss that same year.

On December 13, 1929, Priscilla Fansler Hobson married Alger Hiss in Washington, DC. On August 5, 1941, they had one son, Tony Hiss. In 1959, they separated but did not divorce. (Alger Hiss remarried after her death and outlived her by 12 years.) They had met earlier, in 1924, on an ocean-liner to England. Their nicknames for each other were "Hill" (or "Hilly") and "Prossy" (important because during proceedings Whittaker Chambers and Esther Shemitz remembered "Hilly" and "Dilly").

In 1932, she registered as a Socialist to vote in the U.S. Presidential election (when Norman Thomas was the Socialist candidate). After the Hiss Case, she was a Village Independent Democrats supporter. As one anecdote tells, during the Great Depression, "when a friend of Alger's remarked how pleasant the day seemed... Priscilla snap[ped] back that it might be nice day for people with homes."

Her Bryn Mawr alumni details include addresses over the years, including:

Fansler, Priscilla Harriet A.B. 1924
Mrs. Alger Hiss, (formerly Mrs. Francis Thayer Hobson.)

- 12/31: 180 Claremont St., Cambridge, Mass.
- 11/33w: 3411 "O" St., N.W., Washington, D.C. or 378 Central Park West, N.Y.C.
- 2/35: 2831 - 28th St., Washington, D.C. – Perm: 1427 Linden Ave., Baltimore, Md.
- 1/39: 3415 Volta Place, N.W., Washington, D.C.
- Full: 12/43: 3210 P. St., " " 7 "
- 12/47: 22 E. 8th St., NYC. 3.

The alumni details also state she had received an MA in English literature from Columbia University in 1929. William L. Marbury Jr. wrote of Priscilla Hiss:

I carried away an impression of a rather self-assertive woman, who had no intention of letting Alger "steal the show"...
I got the impression that he felt it wiser that his mother and Priscilla should not be too near one another. Mrs. Charles Hiss was a rather masterful character in her own right, and Priscilla was not exactly the type of a submissive daughter-in-law.

After the Hiss Case, Priscilla Hiss used to leave son Tony to stay at the home of Alger Hiss's personal attorney Helen Lehman Buttenweiser and psychiatrist Dr. Viola W. Bernard. (Buttenweiser's uncle, New York Governor Herbert H. Lehman, served on the same "Committee for the Marshall Plan" as Alger Hiss during 1948. Bernard's family, the Wertheims, included Henry Morgenthau Jr., boss of Harry Dexter White, and Maurice Wertheim and his daughter Barbara W. Tuchman, whose daughter Jessica Matthews later headed the Carnegie Endowment for International Peace half a century after Alger Hiss had.)

One of her cousin's was Sarah ("Sally") Flanders, wife of Dr. Donald ("Moll") Flanders, who "took messages from Sally to her cousin Priscilla, who was under surveillance because her husband was Alger Hiss."

Hiss died age 81 on October 14, 1984, at St. Vincent's Hospital in Manhattan.

== Works ==
- Research in the Fine Arts in the Colleges and Universities of the United States with Roberta Fansler (New York: Carnegie Corporation, 1934)

== See also ==
- Alger Hiss
- Thayer Hobson
- Dean Fansler
