= Thayer Hobson =

American business executive (1897-1967)

- Born: Francis Thayer Hobson; September 4, 1897; Denver, Colorado
- Died: October 19, 1967 (aged 70); Nix Memorial Hospital; San Antonio, Texas
- Employer: William Morrow and Company
- Spouse(s): Janet Camp (m. 1920–1925) Priscilla Fansler (m. 1925; div. 1927) Laura Zametkin (m. 1930–1935) Isabelle Lavis Garrabrants (m. 1935–1960) Elizabeth Tonkin Davis (m. 1960)
- Relatives: Henry Hobson (brother)

Francis Thayer Hobson (September 4, 1897 – October 19, 1967) was an American business executive, president and chairman of the board of William Morrow and Company.

== Background ==
Hobson was born on September 4, 1897, and had a brother, Henry Hobson, who became a Bishop in the Episcopal Church. He had a sister, Eleanor Whiteside Hobson (1893–1986). He attended Yale University but left before graduation to join the French army during World War I.

== Career ==
In 1917, he served as a machine gunner for the American Expeditionary Force but was wounded and was sent home in 1918. He returned to Yale University and worked as the business manager for the Yale Daily News. Hobson graduated Yale in 1920 and then worked as an English teacher at Westminster School and at Yale College. From 1922 to 1924, he did postgraduate work at Yale.

When William Morrow died in 1931, Hobson bought control of William Morrow and Company and made himself president. While at Morrow, Hobson was the publisher of Erle Stanley Gardner, who wrote the Perry Mason series. In 1958 he became Chairman of the Board.

== Personal life and death ==
In 1925, he divorced his first wife. In 1925, he went to Paris to study at the Sorbonne. His second wife was Priscilla Harriet Fansler, who after their divorce married Alger Hiss and became Priscilla Hiss. His third wife, from 1930 to 1935, was Laura Kean Zametkin who, as Laura Z. Hobson, wrote the acclaimed novel about antisemitism Gentleman's Agreement and other novels. He was later married to Isabelle Lavis Garrabrants and Elizabeth Tonkin Davis.

Hobson died on October 19, 1967, in San Antonio, Texas.
