= William Morrow and Company =

American publishing company

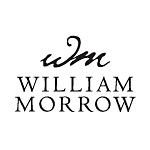
- Parent company: HarperCollins
- Founded: 1926; 100 years ago
- Founder: William Morrow
- Country of origin: United States
- Headquarters location: New York City
- Publication types: Books
- Imprints: Custom House, Witness Impulse, Arbor House
- Official website: harpercollins.com

William Morrow and Company is an American publishing company founded by William Morrow in 1926. The company was acquired by Scott Foresman in 1967, sold to Hearst Corporation in 1981, and sold to News Corporation (now News Corp) in 1999. The company is now an imprint of HarperCollins.

William Morrow has published many fiction and non-fiction authors, including Ray Bradbury, Michael Chabon, Beverly Cleary, Neil Gaiman, Erle Stanley Gardner, B. H. Liddell Hart, Elmore Leonard, Steven Levitt, Steven Pinker, Judith Rossner, and Neal Stephenson.

Francis Thayer Hobson was president and later chairman of the board of William Morrow and Company.

== Morrow authors ==
- Christopher Andersen
- Katherine Burdekin
- Harriet Brown
- Tabitha Brown
- Karin Slaughter
- Harry Browne
- Stephen Brusatte
- Meg Cabot
- Beverly Cleary
- Charles Dickinson
- Warren Ellis
- Bruce Feiler
- Neil Gaiman
- David J. Garrow
- Nikki Giovanni
- John Grogan
- Andrew Gross
- Jean Guerrero
- Joe Hill
- Ismail Kadare
- Steven Levitt
- Marjorie Herrera Lewis
- Walter Lord
- Elizabeth Lowell
- Gregory Maguire
- Nicolai Malko
- Aubrey Mayhew
- Margaret Mead
- Christopher Moore
- Gerard K. O'Neill
- Wayne Pacelle
- Laurence J. Peter
- Robert Pirsig
- Nathan W. Pyle
- Cokie Roberts
- James Rollins
- Judith Rossner
- Thomas Savage
- Nick Schuyler
- Sidney Sheldon
- Margot Lee Shetterly
- Nevil Shute
- Dean Silvers
- Neal Stephenson
- Mary Stewart
- Jacqueline Susann
- Stephanie S. Tolan
- Paul G. Tremblay
- Irving Wallace
- David Wallechinsky
- Morris West
- Gary Zukav

== Morrow's former book series ==
- American Men of Letters
- Americans Abroad Series
- Americans-Discover-America Series
- Apollo Editions
- Asterix
- Beginning of Things (series)
- Britain at War
- The Film Encyclopedia
- Forms and Colors Series
- Freedom's Battle
- The Gardener's Catalogue Series
- Gods and Heroes of the New World
- Lathrop Craft Books
- Luis Mendoza Mystery (series)
- Morrow Junior Books
- Morrow Mystery
- Motor Boating & Sailing Guide Series
- National Poetry Series
- Pocket Books
- Quill Mysterious Classic (series)
- Rabbi Small Mystery (series)
- Reynal's World History of Great Sculpture
- Science Club Series
- Weekly Reader Children's Book Club Series
