= Harvard Project on Cold War Studies =

The stated function of the Harvard Project on Cold War Studies (HPWCS) is to further the progress of, and actively encourage the ongoing primary research of archival, Cold War documents in the former Eastern-bloc nations. These documents have only become available since the collapse of the Soviet Union in 1991, and rapidly increase in numbers year by year. This function, or focus, is then combined with the intent to build on and apply the knowledge gained from this process. The project also encourages scholars and students to apply insights gained from research to current discourses pertaining to areas of international and domestic politics.

== Overview ==
Another component of this focus is helping to sort through these documents with the Cold War International History Project (CWIHP), and the National Security Archive, which have the lead sorting through these documents. Therefore, the Harvard project adds the resources of its large and distinguished university to this substantial task.

Furthermore, this process allows the project to derive knowledge and lessons that are relevant to current policy, from the Cold War archives. The overarching theme of these lessons is realizing that direct military confrontation was avoided, despite the occurrence of critical situations and dilemmas. The results are recommendations for managing or avoiding post–Cold War conflicts, and for dealing with the proliferation of post war nuclear weapons. Deriving such lessons then becomes applicable to enhancing what is known about Cold War events and themes.

Scholars and student researchers are able to communicate their applicable insights through scholarly publications which this project sponsors. These publications include the Harvard Cold War Studies Book Series and the peer-reviewed Journal of Cold War Studies.

== Disseminating knowledge ==
Conduits for disseminating knowledge derived from these efforts are accessible declassified documents via the internet, the Ethnic Conflict and Nationalist Unrest project, the nuclear weapons history exhibit (also available online), highlighting cold war subject areas (also available online), and the aforementioned Journal of Cold War Studies. Another conduit is the aforementioned Harvard Cold War Studies Book Series consisting of eight volumes as of 2006, while several more are being edited or are in production (2006).

=== Book Series ===
The book series is in keeping with the goals of this project by disseminating knowledge gained from studying primary documents, including first hand accounts, and reviewing cold war events and themes from different perspectives, including hindsight. With the book series archival evidence is brought forward to the post-cold-war perspective. The evidence is applied to determine the validity of theoretical concepts composed during the cold war as a result of events during that time period. Rowman & Littlefield publishes the books of this series.

A two-stage review process resulted in contents consisting of original monographs, and edited selected collections. An editing board consisting of 32 scholars, who are considered to be distinguished, were consulted when selecting books for this series. Board membership is international in scope with members from colleges and universities in Budapest, Moscow, Prague, Rome, Fontainebleau (France), Warsaw, and various universities throughout the United States.
