= Perjury: The Hiss–Chambers Case =

1978 book by Allen Weinstein

- Author: Allen Weinstein
- Language: English
- Genre: Legal
- Publisher: Knopf
- Publication date: 1978
- Publication place: United States
- Media type: Hardcover
- ISBN: 9780091333805

Perjury: The Hiss–Chambers Case is a 1978 book by Allen Weinstein on the Alger Hiss perjury case. The book, in which Weinstein argues that Alger Hiss was guilty, has been cited by many historians as the "most important" and the "most thorough and convincing" book on the Hiss–Chambers case. Weinstein drew upon 30,000 pages of FBI documents released through the Freedom of Information Act, the files of the Hiss defense attorneys, over 80 interviews with involved parties and six interviews with Hiss himself. In 1997, Weinstein published an updated and revised edition of Perjury, which incorporated recent evidence from Venona project decrypted cables, released documents from Soviet intelligence archives and information from former Soviet intelligence operatives.

== Background ==
On August 3, 1948, Whittaker Chambers, Time magazine editor and former Communist Party USA member, testified under subpoena before the House Committee on Un-American Activities (HUAC) that former State Department and United Nations official Alger Hiss had secretly been a member of the Communist Party while in federal service. Chambers had previously testified under oath that Hiss had never been a Communist. Called before HUAC, Hiss categorically denied the charge. He urged Chambers to repeat his claims outside of the congressional hearing, where they would not be protected from a defamation suit. Chambers reiterated the charge on Meet the Press, and Hiss instituted a libel lawsuit against him.

During the pretrial discovery process, Chambers produced new evidence indicating that he and Hiss had been involved in espionage for the Soviet Union, which each had previously denied under oath to HUAC. The statute of limitations for espionage had expired, but a federal grand jury indicted Hiss on two counts of perjury; Chambers admitted to the same offense, but as a cooperating government witness he was not charged. After a mistrial due to a hung jury, Hiss was tried a second time. In January 1950, he was found guilty on both counts of perjury and received two concurrent five-year sentences, of which he eventually served 44 months. Arguments about the case and the validity of the verdict took center stage in broader debates about the Cold War, McCarthyism, and the extent of Soviet espionage in the United States. Although a variety of evidence has been added to the debate since his conviction, the question of Hiss's guilt or innocence proved controversial. Weinstein's book argued for Hiss' guilt.

== Content ==
=== Approach ===
In arguing for Hiss's guilt, the book presented no major new revelations about the case; the new materials tend to enhance Chambers' credibility and undermine Hiss's. Weinstein noted a great many points at which Chambers's story, or an assumption of Hiss's guilt, seemed to be a better fit to documented facts than did Hiss's accounts of events. In his review of Perjury, George Will wrote "the myth of Hiss's innocence suffers the death of a thousand cuts."

As historian Ellen Schrecker reports, other information came out later when the VENONA transcripts were released in 1995 and the archives of the defunct Soviet Union were opened in the 1990s. By 2010, according to Schrecker, "everyone but [Alger's son] Tony Hiss and a tiny handful of hold-outs...accepts the guilt of Alger Hiss."

=== Questions about Hiss's defense ===
Among the points where Weinstein found Hiss's defense questionable were the following:

- Hiss's disclosure of the history of the Woodstock typewriter appeared to be "secretive and improvise," and that he at times seemed to mislead investigators deliberately about the probable current whereabouts of the typewriter.
- Hiss stated that he had given an old car to Chambers, but Chambers said that Hiss had donated it to the Communist Party. Documents show that Hiss transferred title for the car to a dealer, who immediately resold the car to a known Communist Party member.
- Chambers testified that in 1937 he had given Oriental rugs to four of his espionage sources, including Hiss, in appreciation for their work. Hiss responded that he had received the rug from Chambers in 1935 as payment for a debt. Evidence indicates that Chambers had in fact given rugs to three other known Communist agents and that he had bought them in late 1936.
- Chambers claimed that the Hisses lent him $400 in 1937 or 1938. Records show that Priscilla Hiss withdrew $400 from the couple's joint savings account in November 1937. The Hisses testified that they withdrew the money to buy furniture for a new apartment, but they had not signed a lease for a new apartment at the time of the withdrawal.
- The evidence seems to favor Chambers's description of a close working relationship between himself and Hiss during the 1930s more than Hiss's account of a casual acquaintanceship. That included Hiss subletting his apartment to Chambers without a formal lease, Hiss giving Chambers use of his car without transferring the title, and evidence that Chambers was in the Hiss home in 1937, a year after Hiss said he broke off contact with Chambers.

Weinstein also devotes an appendix to examining and dismissing various "conspiracies" that Hiss defenders have proposed to explain the evidence against Hiss.

=== Conclusion ===
In his conclusion, Weinstein writes "the body of available evidence proves that Hiss perjured himself when describing his secret dealings with Chambers, so that the jury in his second trial made no mistake in finding Alger Hiss guilty as charged."

== Criticism ==
Some authors have been critical of Perjury. Victor Navasky reported that he wrote to seven of Weinstein's "key sources" and six of the seven "responded that they had been misquoted, quoted out of context, misrepresented, misconstrued, or misunderstood." Weinstein countered that the sources were only recanting their previous statements. One of Weinstein's sources, Samuel Krieger, sued Weinstein for libel in 1979. Weinstein settled out of court by paying Krieger an undisclosed sum, promising to correct future editions of his book, and to release his interview transcripts, which he subsequently failed to do.

Although he said several times that he would make his files and interview tapes available to other investigators, Weinstein never did.

In the late 1990s, Weinstein conducted research into Soviet intelligence files with former KGB operative Alexander Vassiliev. This research was primarily for the 1999 book The Haunted Wood, but the material Vassiliev and Weinstein found that related to the Hiss case was added to the 1997 edition of Perjury. It was later revealed that some scholarly friction existed between the two coauthors. Vassiliev stated, "I never saw a document where Hiss would be called ALES or ALES may be called Hiss. I made a point of that to Allen." Weinstein was "sloppy almost every time he quoted documents relating to Alger Hiss." However, in a 2002 episode of PBS's NOVA, Vassiliev said, "The Rosenbergs, Theodore Hall and Alger Hiss did spy for the Soviets, and I saw their real names in the documents, their code names, a lot of documents about that. How you judge them is up to you. To me, they're heroes."

== See also ==
- Whittaker Chambers
- Alger Hiss
- Communist Party USA
- House Committee on Un-American Activities
- Cold War
