= Journal of Cold War Studies =

- Discipline: History of the Cold War
- Language: English
- Edited by: Mark Kramer

Publication details
- History: 1999–present
- Publisher: MIT Press on behalf of the Harvard Project on Cold War Studies (United States)
- Frequency: Quarterly

Standard abbreviations
- ISO 4: J. Cold War Stud.

Indexing
- ISSN: 1520-3972 (print); 1531-3298 (web)
- LCCN: 2002238819
- OCLC no.: 39447794

Links
- Journal homepage; Online access

The Journal of Cold War Studies is a quarterly peer-reviewed academic journal on the history of the Cold War. It was established in 1999 and is published by MIT Press for the Harvard Project on Cold War Studies. The journal is issued also under the auspices of the Davis Center for Russian Studies (summer 2005). The editor in chief is Mark Kramer (Harvard University).

== Scope ==
The journal covers the Cold War from a historical perspective by publishing research results from East and West archives during this period, as well as new memoirs. Topical coverage encompasses theories of decision making, deterrence, bureaucratic politics, institutional formation, bargaining, diplomacy, foreign policy conduct, and international relations. There is also a significant section for book reviews pertaining to the Cold War and international politics.

== Publishing frequency ==
The Journal of Cold War Studies initially published three issues per year. Since 2002 it has been a quarterly publication.

== Abstracting and indexing ==
The Journal of Cold War Studies in abstracted and indexed in the following databases: CSA Worldwide Political Science Abstracts, GeoRef, International Bibliography of Periodical Literature, ProQuest, and Scopus.
