= List of Americans in the Venona papers =

List of names deciphered from codenamed contained in the Venona papers

The following list of Americans in the Venona papers is a list of names deciphered from codenames contained in the Venona project, an American government effort from 1943–1980 to decrypt coded messages by intelligence forces of the Soviet Union. To what extent some of the individuals named in the Venona papers were actually involved with Soviet intelligence is a topic of dispute.

The following list of individuals is extracted in large part from the work of historians John Earl Haynes and Harvey Klehr and reflects their previous points of view. However, Haynes' positions on the meaning and correct identification of names on the list continues to evolve.

Non-Americans may also be mentioned in passing.

== Notes and disclaimers on the list ==
Names marked with a double asterisk (**) do not appear in the Venona documents. Inclusion has been inferred to correlate with codenames or similarly spelled names found in the documents.

Similarly, identities that have been inferred by researchers (i.e., the name appears in the Venona documents, but positive identification of the individual bearing that name does not), are also marked with a double asterisk (**).

== List ==
- John Abt, attorney and politician**
- Solomon Adler, economist**
- Rudy Baker, politician**
- Joel Barr, engineer
- Alice Barrows, educator
- Theodore Bayer, President, Russky Golos Publishing
- Cedric Belfrage, journalist
- Elizabeth Bentley, teacher and politician
- Joseph Milton Bernstein
- Earl Browder, American communist and General Secretary of the Communist Party USA from 1934 to 1945.
- Paul Burns**
- Sylvia Callen**
- Virginius Frank Coe
- Lona Cohen**
- Morris Cohen**, Communist Party USA & Portland spy ring member who was courier for Manhattan Project physicist Theodore Hall.
- Judith Coplon, Department of Justice employee
- Lauchlin Currie, White House economic adviser to President Franklin Roosevelt and director of World Bank mission to Colombia.
- Byron T. Darling**
- William Dawson, United States Ambassador to Uruguay
- Eugene Dennis, politician and labor organizer
- Samuel Dickstein, politician and judge**
- Martha Dodd**, daughter of William Dodd, who served as the United States ambassador to Germany between 1933 and 1937.
- William E. Dodd, Jr., educator; son of William Dodd and brother of Martha Dodd
- Laurence Duggan, head of the South American desk at the United States Department of State during World War II.
- Eufrosina Dvoichenko-Markov
- Nathan Einhorn
- Jack Bradley Fahy
- Linn Markley Farish, senior liaison officer with Josip Broz Tito's Yugoslav Partisan forces
- Edward J. Fitzgerald
- Charles Flato
- Isaac Folkoff
- Jane Foster
- Zalmond David Franklin
- Isabel Gallardo
- Boleslaw K. Gerbert
- Rebecca Getzoff
- Harold Glasser, U.S. Treasury Dept. economist, United Nations Relief and Rehabilitation Administration (UNRRA) spokesman.
- Bela Gold
- Harry Gold, sentenced to 30 years for his role in the Rosenbergs' ring
- Sonia Steinman Gold
- Jacob Golos, "main pillar" of NKVD spy network, particularly the Sound/Myrna group, he died in the arms of Elizabeth Bentley
- George Gorchoff
- Gerald Graze**
- David Greenglass, machinist at Los Alamos sentenced to 15 years for his role in Rosenberg ring; he was the brother of executed Ethel Rosenberg
- Ruth Greenglass, wife of David Greenglass
- Theodore Alvin Hall, Manhattan Project physicist who gave plutonium purification secrets to Soviet intelligence.
- Maurice Halperin, American writer, professor, diplomat, and Soviet spy (NKVD code name "Hare").
- Kitty Harris
- Clarence Hiskey**
- Cary Hiles
- Alger Hiss, lawyer involved in the establishment of the United Nations, both as a U.S. State Department and UN official.
- Donald Hiss**
- Harry Hopkins, one of FDR's closest advisers & New Deal architect, esp. Works Progress Administration (WPA); as a diplomat in charge of relations between FDR and Stalin his name naturally appears on the list.
- Louis Horwitz
- Bella Joseph**
- Emma Harriet Joseph
- Gertrude Kahn
- Joseph Katz
- Helen Grace Scott Keenan
- Mary Jane Keeney, librarian
- Philip Keeney
- Alexander Koral**
- Helen Koral
- Samuel Krafsur
- Charles Kramer, economist
- Christina Krotkova
- Sergej Nikolaevich Kurnakov
- Fiorello La Guardia, mayor of New York City
- Stephen Laird
- Oscar Lange, economist and diplomat
- Richard Lauterbach, employee at Time magazine
- Duncan C. Lee
- Michael S. Leshing
- Helen Lowry
- William Mackey
- Harry Samuel Magdoff
- William Malisoff, owner and manager of United Laboratories
- Hede Massing**
- Robert Owen Menaker
- Floyd Cleveland Miller
- James Walter Miller
- Robert Miller**
- Robert G. Minor, Office of Strategic Services, Belgrade
- Leonard Emil Mins
- Nichola Napoli
- Franz Neumann**
- David K. Niles
- Eugénie Olkhine
- George Oppen**
- Mary Oppen**
- Frank Oppenheimer**
- Julius Robert Oppenheimer, scientific director of the Manhattan Project and chief advisor to the U.S. Atomic Energy Commission.
- Nicholas V. Orloff
- Edna Margaret Patterson
- William Perl
- Victor Perlo
- Vladimir Aleksandrovich Posner, United States War Department
- Lee Pressman
- Mary Wolfe Price
- Bernard Redmont**
- Peter Rhodes
- Stephan Sandi Rich
- Kenneth Richardson, World Wide Electronics
- Samuel Jacob Rodman, United Nations Relief and Rehabilitation Administration
- Franklin Delano Roosevelt, President of the United States 1933-45, his name appears on the list under the code name "capitan". (Winston Churchill's codename was "boar."
- Allen Rosenberg
- Julius Rosenberg, United States Army Signal Corps Laboratories, executed for role in the Rosenberg ring
- Ethel Rosenberg, executed for role in Rosenberg ring based on testimony of her brother, David Greenglass
- Amadeo Sabatini
- Alfred Epaminodas Sarant
- Marian Miloslavovich Schultz
- Milton Schwartz
- John Scott, journalist
- Ricardo Setaro
- Charles Bradford Sheppard, Hazeltine Electronics
- Abraham George Silverman
- Nathan Gregory Silvermaster, U.S. War Production Board (WPB) economist and head of a major ring of spies in the U.S. government.
- Helen Silvermaster, Leader of the American League for Peace & Democracy and the National Federation for Constitutional Liberties.
- Morton Sobell
- Jack Soble
- Robert Soble
- Johannes Steele
- I. F. Stone, Investigative journalist whose newsletter, I. F. Stone's Weekly, was ranked 16th out of 100 by his fellow journalists.
- Augustina Stridsberg
- Anna Louise Strong
- Helen Tenney**
- Mikhail Tkach, editor of the Ukrainian Daily News
- William Ludwig Ullmann
- Irving Charles Velson
- Margietta Voge
- Henry A. Wallace, Vice President of the United States 1941-45
- William Weisband**
- Donald Wheeler
- Maria Wicher
- Harry Dexter White, senior U.S. Treasury department official, primary designer of the International Monetary Fund and the World Bank.
- Ruth Beverly Wilson
- Ignacy Witczak**
- Ilya Elliott Wolston
- Flora Don Wovschin
- Jones Orin York
- Daniel Abraham Zaret, Spanish Civil War veteran
- Mark Zborovski, anthropologist

== See also ==
- Active measures
- History of Soviet and Russian espionage in the United States
- List of Soviet agents in the United States
