= Voge =

Voge is a surname. Notable people with the surname include:

- Ingo Voge (born 1958), East German bobsledder
- Margietta Voge, American spy
- Petra Voge, East German cross-country skier
- Richard George Voge (1904–1948), United States Navy officer

== See also ==
- USS Voge (FF-1047), United States Navy frigate
