= Korotkov =

Korotkov (masculine, Russian: Коротков) or Korotkova (feminine, Russian: Коротковa) is a Russian surname. Notable people with the surname include:

- Andrey Korotkov (1954–2012), first Deputy Communications and Information Minister in Russia
- Aleksandr Korotkov (1909–1961), Soviet spy
- Egor Korotkov (born 1986), Russian freestyle skier
- Ilya Korotkov (born 1983), Russian javelin thrower
- Konstantin Korotkov, Russian scientist who developed technology for a form of Kirlian photography known as Gas Discharge Visualization (GDV)
- Leonid Korotkov (born 1965), governor of Amur Oblast in Siberia, Russia
- Maria Zemskova-Korotkova, Russian rowing coxswain
- Nikolai Korotkov (1874–1920), Russian surgeon
- Nikolai Korotkov (footballer) (1893–1954), Russian football player
- Taisia Korotkova, Russian artist
- Vladimir Korotkov (footballer, born 1941), Soviet Russian football player and coach
- Vladimir Korotkov (tennis) (1948–2025), Soviet tennis player
- Kira Muratova (née Korotkova) (1934–2018), Soviet and Ukrainian film director

== See also ==
- Krotkov
