= Mikhail Tkach =

Mikhail Tkach, also Michal Tkacz, Michael J. Tkach, and M. Nastivsky, (October 18, 1891 – ??) born in Mastisiw, Poland, of Ukrainian parents, and arrived in the United States at New York City on November 25, 1909, under the name Michal Tkacz. Tkach's wife, Yeroslava, was born in Slatchev, Poland, and entered the U.S. in 1913. The Tkachs lived in New York City from 1922 onwards. Tkach became a naturalized U. S. citizen in New York City on December 8, 1936.

Tkach had long been active in the Communist Party of the United States (CPUSA) and was editor of the Ukrainian Daily News, the leading Ukrainian Communist newspaper in the U.S. As early as 1923, under the name M. Nastivsky, Tkach was an organization member of the Society for Technical Aid to Soviet Russia. Elizabeth Bentley told the FBI that in 1941 and 1942 Tkach had provided Jacob Golos with considerable information concerning the Ukrainian nationalism movement in the United States which Golos considered of great importance. Golos told Bentley much of the information was secured by Tkach from one W. J. Stepankowski, who for a time worked as an investigator for Golos. In July 1944 Tkach was elected president of the Ukrainian Section of the International Workers Order, a communist-affiliated insurance and fraternal order. The Ukraniain Daily News was by that time published by the Ukrainian Section of the IWO.

Tkach supervised a small network of American communists working as agents of the Soviet Union. Tkach's daughter, Ann Sidorovich, and her husband, Michael Sidorovich, were part of Julius Rosenberg's espionage network. Tkach's agent handler was SELIM KHAN, or KHAN, thought to be Avram Landy who also had contact with Albert Kahn, Eufrosina Dvoichenko-Markov, Walter Bernstein, and Bolesław Gebert. Tkach was investigated under the Internal Security Act by the FBI New York Field Division, which considered him to be a key figure in Communist subversion .

== Venona ==
Tkach's cover name as assigned by Soviet intelligence and deciphered in Venona project transcripts is PERCH. Tkach is referenced in the following Venona decrypts:

Venona 1056 KGB New York to Moscow, 3 July 1943; 823 KGB New York to Moscow, 7 June 1944; 881 KGB New York to Moscow, 20 June 1944; 1076 KGB New York to Moscow, 29 July 1944; 202 KGB New York to Moscow, 10 February 1945; 116 KGB Moscow to New York, 9 February 1945; 143 KGB Moscow to New York, 15 February 1945.
