= Jenny Levy Miller =

Jenny Miller, née Jenny Levy (born 1906, date of death unknown), was an American journalist. With her husband, Robert Talbott Miller, III, she is alleged to have participated in covert espionage activities for the Soviet Union during the Stalin period.

== Biography ==
The Millers were married in the American Embassy in Moscow in December 1935. Jenny, the daughter of an employee of the Academy of Sciences in Moscow, was employed by the English language Moscow News, while Bob was on assignment for the Chattanooga News. After the Spanish Civil War, the Millers returned to the United States and began operation of the Hemispheric News Service in New York City with Jack Fahy, a veteran of the International Brigades. The publication centered on Latin American affairs, and Jenny was the operations Secretary. In 1941 the Millers moved to Washington, D.C., and Joseph Gregg was hired as manager.

The Millers had an active social life with many friends. Pelageya (or Polia) Habicht, a Russian native and very close friend of Jenny was exchanged in 1941 to the United States for Gaik Ovakimian, Soviet rezident and head of Soviet foreign espionage activities in the United States from 1934 to 1941 at the time of his arrest as an unregistered foreign agent. Margaret (Peggy) Greenfield, a communist and economic writer and assistant chief of the Progress Reporting Branch, Division of Research, of the OPA was a frequent contact of Jenny. Elizabeth Bentley, part of the Soviet Golos spy ring, identified Jenny as one of her covert Soviet contacts.
