= Robert Talbott Miller =

American journalist

Robert Talbott Miller III (April 5, 1910 – January 1999) was an American citizen who worked in the United States Office of the Coordinator of Inter-American Affairs during World War II. He was alleged to be part of the Soviet espionage group known as the "Golos ring" in the 1940s.

== Biography ==
Miller was born April 5, 1910, in Pittsburgh, Pennsylvania, and lived in Baltimore, Maryland. In August 1934, he moved to Moscow and worked as a correspondent for the Chattanooga News until 1937. In Moscow, Miller met and married his wife, Jenny Levy, an American. In 1937, Miller became press agent for the Spanish Republican government. In 1939, the Millers moved to New York City, and Miller became President of the Hemisphere News Service and editor of its weekly publication, Hemisphere. Jack Fahy, another suspected spy for the Soviet Union, was Vice President and Treasurer. Miller was known to be meeting with Jacob Golos as early as February 1941 in New York. Sometime that same year, the Millers relocated to Washington D.C. so that he could take employment as an analyst for the Office of the Coordinator of Inter-American Affairs (OCIAA) in the Department of Commerce at a good salary. He later became Director of the Division of Reports of the OCIAA. About this time, Miller allegedly began supplying information to Elizabeth Bentley for the Golos network. Miller had access to information from the Office of Naval Intelligence (ONI), Army G-2 (Intelligence), the Office of Strategic Services (OSS), and the FBI concerning Latin American affairs. The material Miller allegedly provided Bentley for transmission to Soviet intelligence always concerned Communist or Russian activities in Latin America.

In September 1941, the Hemisphere News Service moved to Washington D.C. and became the Export Information Bureau, managed by Joseph Gregg, and received a contract to do exclusive research work for the Coordinator of Inter-American Affairs. At the same time, Robert Miller became a research analyst with the OCIAA. The Export Information Bureau was subsequently absorbed into the CIAA.

In December 1941, Miller was interviewed by D.M. Ladd of the FBI about a request to investigate several individuals and organizations for OCIAA, including an organization called the "Society for Pan-American Confraternity". In February 1942, at the request of Undersecretary James Forrestal, FBI Special Agent Jerry Doyle had lunch with John Nitze, a former employee of Forrestal. Nitze was accompanied by Miller, who was described as being in charge of intelligence for the OCIAA. Nitze explained that Miller provided intelligence reports for both the Board of Economic Warfare (BEW) and the OCIAA which were prepared from information supplied by the FBI, Office of Naval Intelligence and Army G-2.

In July 1944, Miller transferred to the Near Eastern Division of the United States Department of State and handled confidential matters between the United States and the Union of Soviet Socialist Republics. By August 1944, it was established Miller had a connection with Greg Silvermaster, head of the Silvermaster group. Miller was also a close associate of Maurice Halperin, who worked for the OSS, State Department, and Soviet intelligence. Charles Flato of the Office of Economic warfare and the Foreign Economic Administration was also one of Miller's contacts.

Miller resigned from the State Department in December 1946. According to Anatoly Gorsky's memo, "Failures in the U.S.A. (1938–1948)," December 1948: in Alexander Vassiliev's Notes from the KGB Archive. Miller's codename was "Mirage." "Mirage," is one of the codenames in The Venona Papers that was not identified by other sources.

== Sources ==
- Elizabeth Bentley, Out of Bondage: The Story of Elizabeth Bentley, Devin-Adair Company, 1951
- FBI Silvermaster file, 2c pgs. 258-270
- FBI Silvermaster file, 4b pgs. 166-173
- Vassiliev, Alexander (2003), Alexander Vassiliev's Notes on Anatoly Gorsky's December 1948 Memo on Compromised American Sources and Networks
