= Samuel Rodman =

Samuel Rodman may refer to:

- Samuel Rodman (spy) (c. 1898–?), American double agent during World War II
- Samuel Rodman (bishop), American Episcopal bishop
