= Kurnakov =

Kurnakov (masculine, Russian: Курнаков) or Kurnakova (feminine, Russian: Курнаковa) is a Russian surname. Notable people with the surname include:

- Nikolai Semenovich Kurnakov (1860–1941), Russian chemist
- Sergey Nikolaevich Kurnakov
