= Krotkov =

Krotkov (Russian: Кротков), feminine: Krotkova is a Russian surname associated with the Russian noble Krotkov family. Notable people with the surname include:

- Christina Krotkova
- Gleb Krotkov
- Iakov Krotkov (1811–1885), Russian Orthodox Church bishop
- Jasmine Krotkov
- Nikodim Krotkov (1868–1938), Russian Orthodox Church archbishop
- Yuri Krotkov

== See also ==
- Korotkov
- Krotov
