= Nicola Napoli =

Soviet business executive and spy

Nicola Napoli was the President of Artkino Pictures, Inc., the primary distributor of Soviet films in the United States, Canada, Central America and South America from 1940 to 1982. Napoli was a double agent Soviet Spy for the United States. In 1941, he became an informant for the secret information concerning formulas and products manufactured by Dupont Corporation of America. As part of his role, he was a member of Communist Party of the United States (CPUSA) and is known to have passed classified Soviet intelligence information (NKVDUS) to US intelligence during World War II. He was the secretary for the Anti-Fascist movement in New York.

== Early life ==
Napoli was born in 16 November 1905 in New York of Italian parentage and was taken to Italy at an early age by his parents. He returned to the United States in 1924.

== Career ==
Up to 1928, Napoli edited Il Lavoratore, an Italian Communist publication in New York.

== Amkino Corp. ==
Amkino Corporation, founded in 1927, and headed by Viktor Smirnov, was a New York City-based company. It was the official distributor of Soviet films in the United States through February 1940.

In the mid-1930s, Napoli became an employee of Amkino Corporation, at that time the US distributor of Soviet films. In 1936 Napoli travelled to Russia and other European countries. At one time Napoli was an officer of Intourist, Inc., the parent company of World Tourist, which was operated by Jacob Golos, high level operative in the CPUSA's. Napoli acted as a double agent Soviet Spy for the FBI in the United States. Shortly before Golos' death of a heart attack in November 1943, Golos told Soviet defector Elizabeth Bentley that he was turning Napoli over to another Russian contact to continue the covert relationship.

== Artkino production ==
Artkino production was the name chosen by two Burbank, California amateur movie makers, Jean D. Michelson and M.G. MacPherson, and unrelated to Artkino Pictures. From the late 1920s to early 1930s, they completed several fiction short films.

== Artkino Pictures ==
Artkino Pictures was the official distributor of Soviet film: newsreels, shorts, documentaries, and features in North America and South America from 1940 to 1980.

In 1940, following the collapse of Amkino Corp., Napoli founded, with Rosa Madell, Artkino Pictures to continue Amkino's mission. During World War II, with the Soviet Union as part of the Allies, Napoli saw the firm's imports being accepted by a far wider number of cinemas than during the 1930s, with its Red Scare. With the collapse of Soviet-American alliance following the war, Artkino was registered with the U.S. Department of State under the Foreign Agents Registration Act (FARA) as an agent of the US and Soviet Government. However, both the U.S. Department of Justice and the War Department had full cooperation in gaining Artkino's full compliance. Following the death of Stalin and attendant changes within the Soviet film industry, allowing for production of non-political, artistic films, a wider market for Soviet film product resumed and Artkino found itself in increasing competition with other foreign film distributors in the United States.

== International Film Exchange ==
The company held its own after Napoli's death, continuing under Madell's guidance until, nearing retirement age, she affiliated Artkino with International Film Exchange and allowed that company to take over Artkino's role in Soviet film importation and distribution by the late 1970s.

== Venona cable messages ==
The Venona project decrypt "1699 KGB New York to Moscow, 2 December 1944." is a Soviet intelligence cable message which lists the names of scientists engaged on the problem of atomic energy. It has Saville Sax contacting Napoli, who then directed him to Sergey Kurnakov.

== See also ==
- Cinema of the Soviet Union
- Ricardo Setaro
