= Midrasz =

Polish language monthly journal

- Editor: Piotr Paziński
- Categories: Jewish culture, literary
- Frequency: Monthly magazine
- Format: Berliner
- Publisher: Stowarzyszenie "Midrasz"
- Founder: Konstanty Gebert
- First issue: 1 April 1997
- Final issue: December 2019
- Country: Poland
- Based in: Warsaw
- Language: Polish
- Website: midrasz.pl
- ISSN: 1428-121X

Midrasz (Polish pronunciation: [ˈmi.draʂ]; Hebrew: מדרש) was a Polish-language monthly journal covering Jewish culture, literature and other topics published in Warsaw, Poland. It existed between April 1997 and December 2019.

== History and profile ==
Midrasz was founded in 1997 by Konstanty Gebert, a renowned Polish journalist, war correspondent and Polish-Jewish activist. The first issue appeared in April 1997. The journal was devoted to Polish, Jewish and Polish-Jewish culture, art, literature, history and religion, as well as contemporary matters. Midrasz also published book reviews and longer essays on a regular basis.

Regular contributors included Zygmunt Bauman, Wilhelm Dichter, Henryk Grynberg, Eva Hoffman, Hanna Krall, Maria Janion, Krystyna Kersten, Jerzy Tomaszewski and Jan Woleński.

Approximately 80% of the readers of Midrasz were educated people between the age of 20 and 40; roughly 40% of the readers were Catholics, 25% were atheists and 15% were Jews.

The journal was closed down due to financial problems. The last issue of Midrasz was published in December 2019.
