= Rebecca Getzoff =

American spy for the Soviet Union

Rebecca Getzoff was an American who worked for the KGB during World War II. Getzoff was engaged in anti-Trotskyist efforts in the United States on behalf of the Soviet Union. Getzoff's cover name in Soviet intelligence and as deciphered in the Venona cables was "Adam".

== Venona ==
Rebecca Getzoff is referenced in the following decrypted Venona cables:

- 826 KGB New York to Moscow, 7 June 1944;
- 851 KGB New York to Moscow, 15 June 1944;
- 907 KGB New York to Moscow, 26 June 1944;
- 942 KGB New York to Moscow, 4 July 1944;
- 292 KGB Moscow to New York, 29 March 1945.
