= Konstanty Gebert =

Polish journalist and activist

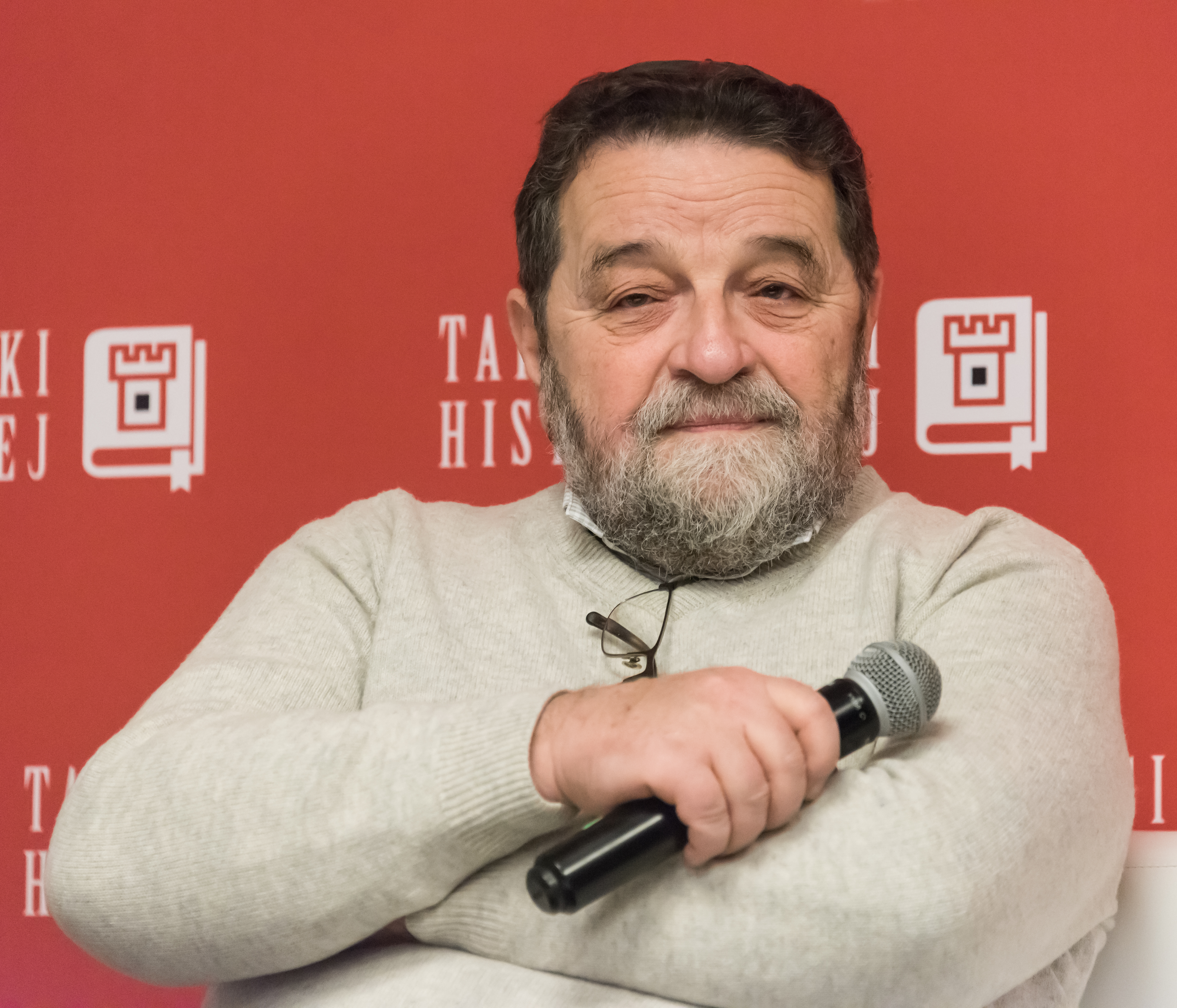
- Konstanty Gebert, Warsaw (11 October 2005)
- Born: 22 August 1953 (age 73)
- Citizenship: Polish
- Education: University of Warsaw
- Occupations: journalist, author
- Relatives: Boleslaw Gebert
- Writing career
- Pen name: Dawid Warszawski
- Language: Polish
- Movement: Solidarity (Polish trade union)

Konstanty Julian Gebert (pseudonym Dawid Warszawski; born 22 August 1953) is a Polish journalist and a Jewish activist, as well as one of the most notable war correspondents of various Polish daily newspapers.

== Background ==
Kostanty Gebert was born on 22 August 1953 in Warsaw, son of top Polish United Workers' Party official and former Polish Ambassador to Turkey Bolesław Gebert. He studied at the University of Warsaw. During the 1968 Polish political crisis he participated in students' demonstrations at age 15 with the expectation that his father, a former Communist Party of America organizer, would be proud of him. He commented "I was expecting he'd crack open a bottle of vodka and we'd have a great time. They locked me up at home for three days. Exactly what I would do if it happened to my kid. Fifteen years is not the right age for fighting on the streets. But what heartbreak. I thought I'd become one of the boys. Just like Dad."

== Career ==
=== Anti-Communism ===
In 1978, Gebert was one of the main organizers of the so-called Flying University, a secret institution of higher education educating people on various topics forbidden by the Eastern Bloc government of Poland. In 1980, he joined the Solidarity movement and became one of the members of the "Solidarity of Education and Technics Workers" union.

In 1989, Gebert was one of the accredited journalists present at the Polish Round Table talks. Since 1990, he has worked as a member of the Polish Council of Christians and Jews.

=== Post Communism ===
Since 1992, Gerbert has worked at the Polish daily newspaper Gazeta Wyborcza. He served as a war correspondent during the war in Yugoslavia.

In 1992 and 1993, he served as an advisor to Tadeusz Mazowiecki, then Special Rapporteur of the Human Rights Commission of the United Nations and its representative in former Yugoslavia.

In 1995, he co-founded the Media Development Investment Fund and acted as its vice-chair until 2000.

Since 1997, he has served as head of the Midrasz Polish-Jewish monthly.

Since 2011, he has been an Associate Fellow of the European Council on Foreign Relations since 2011. He serves as "special advisor on international affairs" with nonprofit organisation Humanity in Action.

In a lecture on 9 January 2014 before the Israel Council on Foreign Relations, Gebert said:

People often ask about the importance of democratic traditions in Central Europe in ensuring the ultimate success of the revolution that swept away Communism. I do not think it is all that important, and for a straightforward reason. In Central Europe, with the one exception of Czechoslovakia, democratic traditions, such as they were, never played a significant role ... I don't think democratic traditions are like fruit preserves that you can take out of the larder and eat sixty-five years later.

He is a member of the European Press Prize preparatory committee.

Since November 2021 Gebert is part of the international advisory board of the Austrian Service Abroad.

== Awards ==
- Beata Pawlak Award 2022 for Ostateczne rozwiązania. Ludobójcy i ich dzieło

== Works ==
Books catalogued in the Library of Congress are:

- Mebel (1990)
- Magia słów: polityka francuska wobec Polski po 13 grudnia 1981 roku (1991)
- 54 komentarze do Tory (2003)
- Dziesięć dni Europy : archeologia pamięci (2004)
- Wojna czterdziestoletnia (2004)
- Nesim all around me : the life of David Mitzner as told to Konstanty Gebert (2004)
- Living in the land of ashes (2008)
- Miejsce pod słońcem: wojny Izraela (2008)
- Polski alef-bet: Żydzi w Polsce i ich odrodzony świat with Anna Olej-Kobus, Krzysztof Kobus (2009)
- Juifs en Pologne: quand la Pologne a cessé d'être une terre d'accueil by Alexandra Subrémon, afterword by Konstanty Gebert (2020)
- Ostateczne rozwiązania. Ludobójcy i ich dzieło (2022)
