= Ignacy Witczak =

Soviet spy in the United States

Ignacy Witczak was a GRU illegal officer in the United States during World War II. Witczak was a pseudonym; his real name was Zalman Volfovich Litvin.

Shortly after the 5 September 1945 defection of Igor Gouzenko, a GRU code clerk at the Soviet embassy in Ottawa, Ignacy Samuel Witczak, an instructor at the University of Southern California, disappeared from a beach in Southern California. Later his wife disappeared as well.

The FBI learned Witczak had entered the United States from Canada on a false passport and suspected Witczak was not his true name. The FBI initiated a search for Witczak, as described in the memoirs of FBI special agent Robert Lamphere. Later the FBI was able to trace some of Witczak's former agents, but never learned what happened to him.

The existence of an illegal intelligence officer using the name Ignacy Samuel Witczak was first made public in 1946 in the Canadian government’s Report of the Royal Commission, which presented the results of investigations based Gouzenko's revelations.

Witczak was mentioned again in 1952 in a U.S. congressional report titled The Shameful Years: Thirty Years of Soviet Espionage in the United States, which provides additional detail about the FBI’s investigation. The name Zalman Litvin was not known at that time.

Witczak was also briefly referenced in Venona decrypts, which consist of communications between Moscow and Soviet intelligence stations around the world from 1943 to 1946 that were intercepted and decrypted by the U.S. government, and made publicly available in 1995. Witczak's code name in the communications was "R".

Recent document releases in Britain and Russia, one showing Kim Philby reported on him, identify Witczak as “Litvin” and explain what happened to him after returning to the Soviet Union. Litvin's GRU career ended during a purge of Jews, but he survived, later becoming a translator of American books on intelligence.

Litvin’s real name was first made public in 1990 by Petr Ivanovich Ivashutin, the long-serving former Director of the Main Intelligence Directorate of the General Staff (GRU), in his article titled “Докладывала точно” (“Reported Precisely”) Военно–Исторический Журнал (https://history.milportal.ru/) (Journal of Military History), 1990, No. 5, pp. 55–61.

In 1992, Litvin was interviewed in Russia not long before his death. (Part 1, and Part 2). (English translation of the interview). He describes his experiences as a GRU illegal in China from 1935 to 1937 and the United States from 1938 to 1945, his impressions of the Great Purge on Soviet military intelligence, and his escape from the FBI in 1945.

== Evidence of espionage ==
Ignacy Witczak is referenced in the following Venona decrypts and FBI reports:

- 3, 4, 5 KGB San Francisco to Moscow, 2 January 1946;
- 25 KGB San Francisco to Moscow, 26 January 1946; detailing a Soviet espionage operation in the United States
- FBI report, "Soviet Espionage Activities, 19 October 1945," attached to Hoover to Vaughan, 19 October 1945, President's Secretary's Files, Harry S. Truman Library, Independence, Mo.;
- FBI report, "Soviet Activities in the United States," 25 July 1946, Clark M. Clifford papers, Truman Library.

The NKVD operation to extract Witczak's wife is mentioned in the following Venona decrypts:

- San Francisco to Moscow number 137, 21 April 1944
- San Francisco to Moscow number 426, 8 August 1945
- San Francisco to Moscow number 25, 26 January 1946
