= Clarence Janecek =

American football player (1911–1990)

- Janecek with the Pittsburgh Pirates

No. 35, 39, 16
- Position: Guard

Personal information
- Born: April 1, 1911; Chicago, Illinois, U.S.
- Died: January 16, 1990 (aged 78); Hinsdale, Illinois, U.S.
- Listed height: 6 ft 0 in (1.83 m)
- Listed weight: 200 lb (91 kg)

Career information
- High school: Harrison Tech (Chicago)
- College: Purdue (1929–1932)

Career history
- Pittsburgh Pirates (1933); St. Louis/Kansas City Blues (1934); Dallas Rams (1934); Pittsburgh Pirates (1935)*
- * Offseason or practice squad member only

Career statistics
- Games played: 11
- Stats at Pro Football Reference

Clarence Robert Janecek (April 1, 1911 – January 16, 1990) was an American professional football guard who played one season in the National Football League (NFL) with the Pittsburgh Pirates. He played college football at Purdue University.

== Early life and college ==
Clarence Robert Janecek was born on April 1, 1911, in Chicago, Illinois. He attended Harrison Technical High School in Chicago.

He was a member of the Purdue Boilermakers from 1929 to 1932.

== Professional career ==
Janecek signed with the Pittsburgh Pirates of the National Football League (NFL) in 1933. He started all 11 games for the Pirates during their inaugural 1933 season. The Pirates finished in fifth place in the Eastern Division with a 3–6–2 record in league games. Janecek became a free agent after the season.

He played in two games for the St. Louis/Kansas City Blues of the American Football League (AFL) in 1934. He also appeared in five games, all starts, for the AFL's Dallas Rams that season as well.

Janecek signed with the Pirates again in 1935 but was later released on August 28, 1935.

== Personal life ==
Janecek died on January 16, 1990, in Hinsdale, Illinois.
