= Krotov =

Krotov (Russian: Кротов), feminine: Krotova is a Russian surname. Notable people with the surname include:

- Aleksandr Krotov (footballer, born 1895), Russian association football player
- Aleksandr Krotov (footballer, born 1997), Russian association football player
- Alyaksandr Krotaw (born 1995), Belarusian football player
- Mikhail Krotov (born 1963), Russian lawyer and businessman
- Mykola Krotov (1898–1978), Ukrainian association football player
- Pavel Krotov (1992–2023), Russian freestyle skier
- Vyacheslav Krotov (born 1993), Russian association football player
- Yakov Krotov (born 1957), Russian essayist, historian, radio host and priest
- Zinaida Krotova (1923–2008), Russian speed skater

== See also ==
- Krotkov
- Krotov culture
