= Harrison Technical High School =

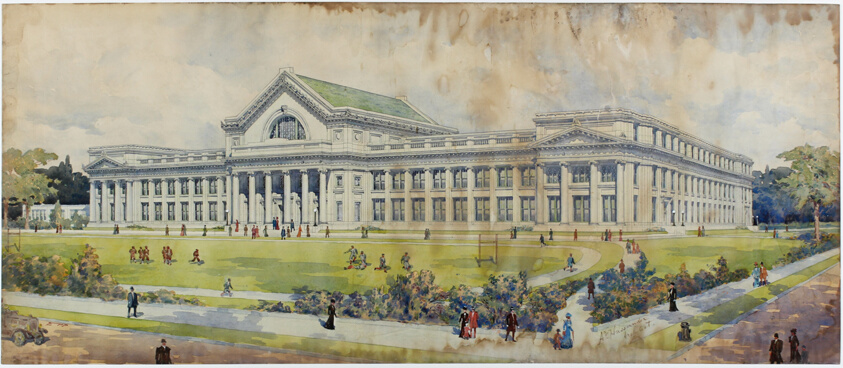
- 1912 illustration of the school's building

Location
- 2850 W. 24th St. Boulevard; Chicago, Illinois 60623; United States; 41°50′55.1″N 87°41′50.0″W

Information
- School type: Public; Secondary
- Established: 1910
- Closed: June 1983
- School district: Chicago Public Schools
- Grades: 9–12
- Gender: Coed
- Campus type: Urban
- Colors: Blue; Gray
- Nickname: Hornets
- Yearbook: Harrisonian

Carter Henry Harrison Technical High School was a public 4–year high school located in the South Lawndale neighborhood of Chicago, Illinois. Opened and operated by the Chicago Public Schools (CPS) district, Harrison was founded in 1910 as a branch of Farragut Career Academy. Harrison operated from 1912 until June 1983. Since its closing, The building has housed several schools; presently the Maria Saucedo Scholastic Academy.

== History ==
The school was opened in 1912 and was named after Chicago mayor Carter H. Harrison, who served as mayor from 1879 to 1887. The school's building was completed in 1914. Starting from 1962 until the opening of Benito Juarez, Harrison had a branch school, Froebel, which served only ninth grade and drew students from the boundaries of Cooper Upper Grade Center and Pickard. Students from Froebel moved onto the main campus for grades 10 to 12. They had briefly experimented with a sophomore year before the school was closed.

By the mid–1960s, street gangs in the area began to adopt a racial identity, and the Mexican student population at the main campus, while still small relative to the overall population, was increasing; at the time racial tension between black and Mexican students increased. By the early 1970s, Most of the students at Froebel were of Mexican origin and 75% of the students were Spanish-speaking.

During the 1980–1981 school year, the Chicago Public Schools voted to phase out Harrison. After graduating its last class of seniors, The school closed in June 1983.

=== Activism ===
A Black and Latino student-led school reform movement started in 1968. The students planned massive walkouts to fight for an end to discrimination in Chicago Public Schools, along with other demands like more teachers of color, bilingual classes, and ethnic studies classes. On October 13, 1968, 35,000 CPS students walked out. Activism at the school continued through the early 1970s. During a March 1972 protest, Mexican-American students demanding better conditions from the school board went on strike

== Athletics ==
Harrison competed in the Chicago Public League (CPL) and was a member of the Illinois High School Association (IHSA). Harrison varsity athletic teams were named the "Hornets". The boys' baseball team were public league champions in 1934. The boys' football team were public league champions once in 1933. The boys' soccer team where public league champions five times (1923–24, 1928–29, 1929–30, 1931–32 and 1972–73). The girls' track and field were state champions in 1973–74. The boys' track and field team were public league champions and class AA in 1975–76.

== Notable alumni ==
- Jack Karwales (Class of 1939) – football player.
- George Cisar (Class of 1929) – baseball player, Brooklyn Dodgers.
- Arthur Goldberg (Class of 1925) – statesmen and jurist, Supreme Court Justice.
- Benny Goodman (Class of 1927) – jazz clarinetist and bandleader.
- Clarence Janecek (Class of 1929) – football player.
- Irwin Kostal (attended) – film musical arranger and Broadway orchestrator
- Frank Kovanda (Class of 1922) – American bow maker
- Irv Kupcinet (Class of 1930) – columnist.
- Rudy Lozano (Class of 1969) – activist and community organizer.
- Walter C. McAvoy (Class of 1922) – politician.
- Richard George Voge (Class of 1921) – U.S. Navy officer.
