= Jack Karwales =

American football player and coach (1920–2004)

- Karwales in 1942

No. 72
- Position: End

Personal information
- Born: June 22, 1920; Chicago, Illinois, U.S.
- Died: December 31, 2004 (aged 84); Chicago, Illinois, U.S.
- Listed height: 6 ft 0 in (1.83 m)
- Listed weight: 220 lb (100 kg)

Career information
- High school: Chicago (IL) Harrison Tech
- College: Michigan

Career history
- Chicago Bears (1946); Chicago Cardinals (1947)

Awards and highlights
- NFL champion (1947)
- Stats at Pro Football Reference

John Joseph Karwales (June 22, 1920 – December 31, 2004) was an American football player. He played at the end and tackle positions for the University of Michigan in 1941 and 1942. Following four years of service in the United States Army Air Forces during and after World War II, he played professional football for the Chicago Bears in 1946 and for the Chicago Cardinals in 1947.

== Early life ==
Karwales was the son of Felix Karwales Sr., and Mary (née Shemky) Karwales. He was born in 1920 on the West Side of Chicago, Illinois, and attended Harrison Technical High School in Chicago.

== College career ==
In 1939, Karwales enrolled at the University of Michigan. He played football at the end position (some at the tackle position in 1942) for Fritz Crisler's Michigan Wolverines football team from 1941 to 1942. Karwales had been expected to play for the 1940 team, but a knee injury sidelined him for the season. In September 1941, Karwales' debut was again delayed due to swelling in his feet that led doctors to "relegate him to a hospital cot for treatment." He played for the 1941 Michigan team that finished 6–1–1 and ranked No. 5 in the final AP poll, and for the 1942 Michigan team that finished 7–3 and ranked No. 9 in the final AP poll.

In August 1943, Karwales played for the College All-Star team that defeated the NFL champion Washington Redskins in the College All-Star Game.

== World War II ==
In 1943, Karwales entered the United States Army Air Forces where he served for almost four years during an after World War II. He served in the Pacific theater, and also played football with the Third Air Force team in 1944.

== Professional career ==
In June 1946, Karwales was signed by George Halas to play for the Chicago Bears. He joined the Bears in August 1946 for their summer training camp in Collegeville, Indiana. According to some sources, Karwales played at the end position for the 1946 Chicago Bears team that won the NFL championship. Other sources do not list Karwales among the regular season roster of the 1946 Bears. A Chicago Daily Tribune article from September 1947 reported that Karwales had played with the Akron Bears in 1946.

Karwales participated in training camp and pre-season for the Bears in the summer of 1947. He was released by the Bears on September 22, 1947, prior to the first game of the regular season.

Karwales signed with the Chicago Cardinals on October 1, 1947. He played for the 1947 Cardinals team that compiled a 9–3–0 record and finished 1st in NFL West Division.

== Later years and family ==
Karwales was hampered as a football player by bad knees and retired as a football player in 1948. He coached football at St. Louis University football for three years. He was an assistant coach for the Saint Louis Billikens under head coach Joe Maniaci.

Karwales was married to Virginia Kailer. They had two daughters, Cathy O'Hara and Jill Fink. His brother, Felix Karwales Jr., was a rookie pitcher for the Cleveland Indians in 1940 before being inducted into the U.S. Army. Felix was injured in action in Germany in February 1945 and died in October 1949.

Karwales became a co-owner of the Kailer-Youngquist Oldsmobile dealership in Chicago. The dealership was started by his father-in-law, Louis G. Kailer, who died on January 12, 1956. He later owned an Oldsmobile dealership named Karwales Olds, inc. located in Wheaton, IL.

Karwales was a resident of Evanston, Illinois for approximately 50 years. He retired in 1983, and his wife died in January 1993.

Karwales died on December 31, 2004, at the Bethany Retirement Community in Chicago. His funeral mass was held at St. Catherine Laboure Catholic Church in Glenview, Illinois.
