= Sergey Kurnakov =

Russian journalist

Sergey Nikolaevich Kurnakov or Sergei N. Kournakoff (Russian: Сергей Курнаков; 1892 – 1949) was a former tsarist cavalry officer who had immigrated to the U.S. and later became an ardent ideological Communist and Soviet spy.

== Biography ==
Kurnakov was born at Aladino in the Russian Caucasus in 1892 into a landed noble family of Circassian descent. After serving as an imperial page under Tsar Nicholas II, he joined the Circassian cavalry regiment and served in Galicia and Romania during the First World War 1914-17, being wounded in the hand. During the Russian Civil War, he fought for the White Army. He described his experiences in Savage Squadrons (1935). He subsequently emigrated to America and became a journalist who wrote on military affairs for the Communist Party of the United States of America (CPUSA) paper, the Daily Worker, and other publications

Kurnakov served as a courier to various Soviet intelligence sources, and acted as both a talent-spotter and a vetter of potential recruits. Kurnakov was a highly active liaison agent. He was accused of communism in Time in January 1944 after teaching at a Russian course at Cornell University in the summer of 1943. He was posthumously named as a communist agent in senate hearings in 1953.

His activities as an agent were revealed when the Venona decrypts were made public in 1995. He was the contact for Flora Wovschin's father, Enos Wicher. Kurnakov also took over Mary Jane Keeney who worked for the Board of Economic Warfare and later the United Nations from Soviet Military Intelligence (GRU). Her husband Philip Keeney, who worked for what became the OSS also was taken over by Kurnakov and the KGB.

Kurnakov was the contact between Saville Sax and Theodore Hall. Kurnakov reported Hall to have "an exceptionally keen mind and a broad outlook," and to be "politically developed." At their first meeting, Hall gave Kurnakov a report he had prepared on the Los Alamos facility, the progress of the research, and the roles of the chief scientists working on the atomic bomb. Kurnakov immediately reported to KGB Officers Anatoly Yatskov and Stepan Apresyan on his meeting with Hall.

His son, Nick Kurnakov, served in Europe with the United States Army during World War II until he defected to the Red Army and was given an officer's rank. He joined Radio Moscow after the war.

== Venona ==
Sergey Kurnakov is referenced in the following Venona project decrypts:

833 KGB New York to Moscow, 10 June 1942; 929–930 KGB New York to Moscow, 17 June 1943; 936 KGB New York to Moscow, 17 June 1943; 952 KGB New York to Moscow, 21 June 1943; 985–986 KGB New York to Moscow, 23 June 1943; 1120 KGB New York to Moscow, 10 July 1943; 1251 KGB New York to Moscow, 2 September 1944; 1322 KGB New York to Moscow, 15 September 1944; 1404 KGB New York to Moscow, 5 October 1944; 1438 KGB New York to Moscow, 10 October 1944; 1449 KGB New York to Moscow, 12 October 1944; 1584 KGB New York to Moscow, 12 November 1944; 1585 KGB New York to Moscow, 12 November 1944; 1586 KGB New York to Moscow, 12 November 1944; 1699 KGB New York to Moscow, 2 December 1944; 1714 KGB New York to Moscow, 5 December 1944; 18–19 KGB New York to Moscow, 4 January 1945; 94 KGB New York to Moscow, 23 January 1945; 243 KGB New York to Moscow, 18 March 1945.
