= Lucy Burman =

American writer and communist activist (1922–2004)

- Born: September 21, 1922; Oakland, California, USA
- Died: January 7, 2004 (aged 81)
- Education: San Francisco State University
- Spouse: Charles Flato

Lucille Burman Flato (September 21, 1922 – January 7, 2004) was a writer, American Communist Party member and union activist.

Flato was born in Oakland, California, to Daisy Whitney and Frank Burman. She moved to New York City as a young woman where she became a communist party member and met her future husband Charles Flato, the writer and Soviet agent. She involved herself in party work, as well as union and community activities. In the 1950s, after marrying, she moved to San Francisco.

Besides contributions for other publications, she wrote extensively for the People's Weekly World under the name of Lucille Whitney. Flato was a member of the Glide Memorial Church, an institution reputed for its active participation in progressive social activism.

In 1995, she graduated cum laude from San Francisco State University. She died in 2004 of complications from a massive stroke.
