= Walter C. McAvoy =

American politician and businessman

- Born: September 10, 1904; Chicago, Illinois
- Died: July 5, 1990 (aged 85); Chicago, Illinois

Walter Charles "Babe" McAvoy (September 10, 1904 – July 5, 1990) was an American politician and businessman.

Born in Chicago, Illinois, McAvoy went to parochial school and to Harrison Technical High School. He was involved in the real estate business. From 1943 to 1949 and from 1951 to 1977, McAvoy served in the Illinois House of Representatives as a Republican.

In 1978, McAvoy was convicted in federal court for taking a bribe; he served one year at the federal correctional center in Lexington, Kentucky.

He died at Holy Cross Medical Center in Chicago, Illinois after suffering a stroke.

His son, Tom McAvoy was appointed to the Illinois House of Representatives to replace Republican Edmund Kucharski and served from August 1982 until January 1983.
