= USS Voge =

Warship frigate of the United States Navy

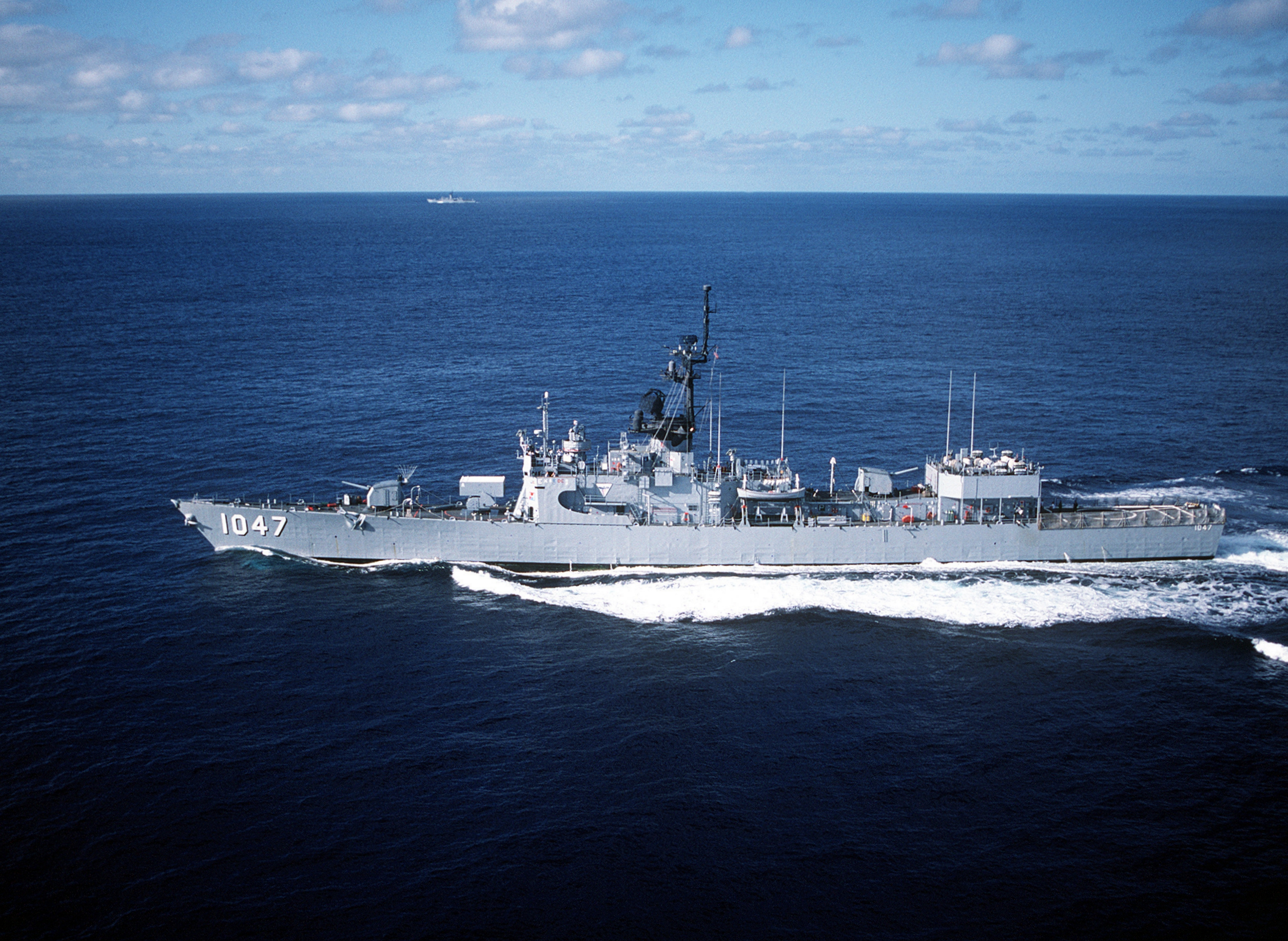
- USS Voge (FF-1047) underway on 12 August 1988

History

United States
- Name: Voge
- Namesake: Richard George Voge
- Ordered: 21 March 1963
- Builder: Defoe Shipbuilding Company, Bay City, Michigan
- Laid down: 21 November 1963
- Launched: 4 February 1965
- Acquired: 15 November 1966
- Commissioned: 25 November 1966
- Decommissioned: 1 August 1989
- Stricken: 15 December 1992
- Fate: Disposed of by scrapping, dismantling, 19 January 2001

General characteristics
- Class & type: Garcia-class frigate
- Displacement: 2,624 tons (light); 3,400 tons full
- Length: 414 ft 6 in (126.34 m)
- Beam: 44 ft 1 in (13.44 m)
- Draft: 24 ft 6 in (7.47 m)
- Propulsion: 2 Foster-Wheeler boilers, 1 steam turbine, 35,000 shp, single screw
- Speed: 27 knots (50 km/h; 31 mph)
- Range: 4,000 nautical miles (7,400 km; 4,600 mi) at 20 knots (37 km/h; 23 mph)
- Complement: 16 officers; 231 enlisted
- Sensors & processing systems: AN/SPS-40 air search radar; AN/SPS-10 surface search radar; AN/SQS-26 bow mounted sonar
- Armament: 2 × single 5 in (127 mm)/38 cal. Mk 30 guns; 1 × 8-tube ASROC Mk16 launcher (16 missiles); 2 × triple 12.75 in (324 mm) Mk 32 torpedo tubes, Mk 46 torpedoes; 2 × MK 37 torpedo tubes (fixed, stern) (removed later)
- Aircraft carried: Gyrodyne QH-50 (planned) / SH-2 LAMPS

USS Voge (FF-1047), a Garcia-class frigate of the United States Navy, was named after Rear Admiral Richard George Voge. It fulfilled a Protection of Shipping (POS) mission as anti-submarine warfare (ASW) combatants for amphibious expeditionary forces, underway replenishment groups and merchant convoys. It made notable contributions to submarine 'hold-down' tactics with sister ship Koelsch. In 1976, Soviet Echo II-class submarine K-22 collided with the Voge.

== History ==
Voge was laid down on 21 November 1963 at the Defoe Shipbuilding Company in Bay City, Michigan. She was launched on 4 February 1965, sponsored by Mrs. Alice Voge Oetting, widow of Rear Admiral Voge; and commissioned at the Boston Naval Shipyard on 25 November 1966. She remained at the Boston Naval Shipyard until 11 April 1967, completing her outfitting. On that day, she stood out of Boston, bound for her home port, Newport, Rhode Island, whence she operated until mid-May. On 15 May, she departed Newport for her shakedown cruise, which lasted until 24 June, and during which she operated out of Guantánamo Bay, Cuba. The ocean escort returned to Newport on 24 June and conducted local operations from there through the end of July. On 1 August, she re-entered the Boston Naval Shipyard for her post-shakedown availability. That yard period occupied her for the remainder of 1967 and during the first two months of 1968.

In March 1968, she rejoined Escort Squadron (CortRon) 6 at Newport, and began duty supporting the development and testing of sophisticated anti-submarine warfare tactics and related equipment. Her operations out of Newport continued through the end of 1968.

In February 1969, she began preparations for a brief cruise to northern Europe to participate in a NATO exercise. She departed Newport on 1 April, and made her first port call at Lisbon, Portugal, later that month, after conducting hunter/killer ASW exercises with ships of the Spanish and Portuguese navies. From Portugal, she moved to Spithead, England, for a Royal Review of the NATO Fleet in celebration of the 20th anniversary of the treaty organization. In late May and early June, she made port visits to Cherbourg, France; Edinburgh, Scotland; and Bremen, Germany; conducting further hunter/killer exercises when at sea between ports.

From Bremen, Voge headed back to Newport, and, en route home, encountered a submarine contact later confirmed as a Soviet Yankee-class submarine. Voge successfully applied hold-down tactics on the Soviet submarine, and later received the Meritorious Unit Commendation for her efforts. Upon completing the usual post-cruise leave and repair period, the ocean escort resumed her duties out of Newport, practicing and testing ASW tactics and testing newly developed ASW equipment. Such a routine occupied her until August 1970 when she entered the Boston Naval Shipyard for her first regular overhaul.

Voge completed her yard period late in January and spent February completing post-overhaul sea trials. After gunnery exercises in the Virginia Capes operating area early in March, she got underway on 12 March 1971 for her refresher training cruise to the Guantanamo Bay operating area. Voge returned to Newport on 10 May, and after a tender availability, resumed operations in the Narragansett Bay area. She continued that routine until the following spring when she crossed the Atlantic for bilateral United States-Spanish ASW exercises and another with ships of the Portuguese Navy. Voge returned home through very heavy weather and reentered Newport on 24 April 1972.

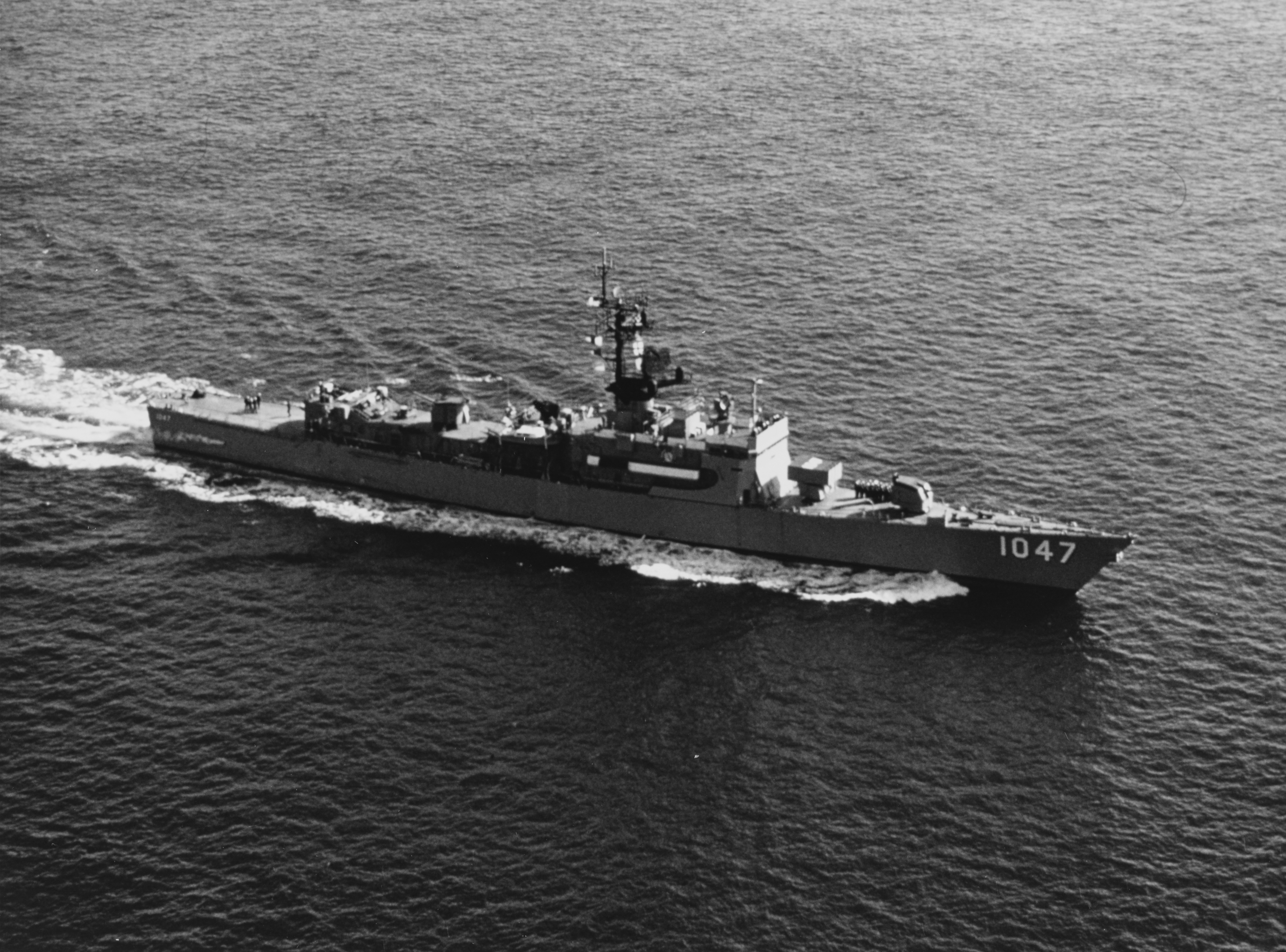
Voge in 1971, before addition of the helicopter hangar.

The ocean escort immediately began preparations for her first deployment with the 6th Fleet in the Mediterranean Sea. On 13 June, the warship began her voyage to Rota, Spain, where she arrived on the 22nd. During the ensuing six months, Voge joined other ships of the 6th Fleet in a series of unilateral and bilateral exercises and made port visits throughout the Mediterranean. Of special interest were her visit to the Turkish Naval War College on Heybeliada Island in the Sea of Marmara in early August, and her participation in the multinational NATO Exercise "Deep Furrow" late in September. In early November, she was assigned special duty shadowing Soviet submarines reporting to and leaving the Mediterranean.

On one occasion, she followed a departing Soviet submarine some 300 miles into the Atlantic before breaking contact and returning to the Mediterranean. On 10 December, she completed turnover to her relief USS Du Pont, and set course for Newport where she arrived on 18 December.

After completing the usual month of post-deployment leave and repairs, Voge resumed normal East Coast operations in January 1973. That routine occupied her through most of 1973, and included two major exercises in March, a brief tour as destroyer school ship in April, participation in bilateral exercises with ships of the French Navy in June, and a midshipman training cruise in July. She received orders changing her home port to Naval Station Mayport, Florida, on 16 August; and four days later, she got underway for the south. She arrived in Mayport on the 22nd, and began local operations which kept her busy until near the end of the year.

Late in December, Voge began preparations to return to the Mediterranean. On 4 January 1974, Voge stood out of Mayport on her way to join the 6th Fleet. She arrived in Rota on 14 January, and relieved Claude V. Ricketts before joining Task Group (TG) 60.1 near Golfe Juan, France, on 19 January. Again, the warship joined units of the 6th Fleet and of allied navies in a series of unilateral and bilateral exercises as well as in at least one multi-lateral exercise. She again made port visits all along the Mediterranean littoral before she departed Rota on 24 June, for home.

After reentering Mayport on 3 July, the ship devoted July to post-deployment leave and upkeep; and a tender availability in Mayport, preparatory to regular overhaul, took care of August. On 4 September, she departed Mayport, and the following day, arrived in Charleston, South Carolina. She entered the Charleston Naval Shipyard late on the 6th, and commenced a 10-month overhaul. While at Charleston, she was reclassified a frigate and redesignated FF-1047 on 1 July 1975.

A fortnight later, her overhaul was completed, and Voge returned to Mayport. Refresher training and naval gunfire support exercises engaged her until October, at which time she returned to Charleston for a three-month restricted availability to correct problems in her main propulsion plant. Late in December, the warship returned to Mayport. Voge remained at her home port until mid-February 1976, when she put to sea to participate in exercises conducted in the Caribbean with units of the Netherlands and British navies.

== Collision with Soviet submarine K-22 ==
Upon her return to port, the frigate began preparations for her third deployment to the Mediterranean. After a brief visit to Charleston, South Carolina, she departed that port on 14 April, and headed for Rota where she arrived on 26 April. During much of that deployment, port visits all along the Mediterranean punctuated a series of training exercises conducted with units of the 6th Fleet and from foreign navies. She also resumed surveillance duties on Soviet naval forces operating in the Mediterranean. On 28 August 1976, while operating in company with USS Moinester in the Ionian Sea at 36°2'N and 20°36'E near Greece, Voge saw the periscope of the Soviet Echo II-class submarine K-22 shadowing Moinester, and apparently unaware of Voge's presence. For about two hours Voge's crew kept K-22 under surveillance, even to the point of getting a number of photos of the periscope. K-22's skipper apparently lost track of Moinester a number of times. Soon the sub skipper noticed Voge for the first time and realized he was about to collide with her. Too late he ordered an emergency dive, and seconds later K-22's bow and sail rammed Voge's port quarter. K-22 had damage to missile container No. 1, extension devices and the fin structure. Voge sustained serious structural damage to the stern that necessitated drydocking at Toulon, France.

== Post-damage deployment ==
On 7 November, Voge successfully completed post-drydock sea trials, and then headed for Rota for turnover. On 20 November, she stood out of Rota bound for Mayport. The frigate reentered her home port on 2 December. Voge spent almost all of the ensuing seven months in port at Mayport, putting to sea only to test the main propulsion plant. On 11 July 1977, she headed back toward Rota in company with the aircraft carrier Saratoga, and the frigate Koelsch for duty with the 6th Fleet. However, she soon was ordered back to Mayport because of contaminated potable water tanks, and reached home on 13 July. On 27 July, the frigate got underway and, after an independent transit of the Atlantic, finally arrived in Rota on 3 August. Again port visits and exercises – unilateral, bilateral, and multilateral – kept her busy during that tour of duty in the "middle sea." On 12 December, she changed operational control back to the 2nd Fleet at Gibraltar, and headed back toward Mayport. The frigate arrived home two days before Christmas and began post-deployment standdown.

Voge spent the first five months of 1978 engaged in training exercises out of Mayport. Early in June, she departed for the Bahamas where she provided services to submarines. The frigate then proceeded to Charleston to load ammunition and continued on to Boston. On 12 July, Voge commenced a scheduled overhaul at Braswell Shipyard in South Boston which continued on into 1979.

== ASW Ships Command & Control System ==
ASW Ships Command & Control System (ASWSC&CS) was a Naval Tactical Data System (NTDS) system for antisubmarine warfare. It was implemented only on Voge, Koelsch and the ASW aircraft carrier Wasp in 1967. The ASWSC&CS allowed the development of improvements in antisubmarine warfare using digital computers, which were implemented in other ASW ship classes. The three ships operated together as a submarine hunter/killer group and gained the reputation as the best in the fleet. In 1969 Voge detected a submerged Soviet submarine and used hold-down tactics on the sub to the point that she forced the sub to surface. For this action Voge was awarded the Meritorious Unit Commendation. The two ASWSC&CS equipped destroyer escorts made a science of tracking Soviet subs and started a whole new concept of the 'hold-down' exercise which restricts the submarine's maneuver and mission options. They had the capability to keep on tracking a Soviet sub until either she surfaced or the tracking ship ran out of power.

UNIVAC was contracted to define the hardware and develop the software to incorporate ASW functions.

== Fate ==
After de-commissioning on 1 August 1989, Voge was put into mothballs at the Philadelphia Naval Shipyard. Voge was sold for scrapping on 25 July 1995, but was repossessed by the Navy from the scrapper. A contract to scrap the ship was finally issued on 26 May 2000 to the Metro Machine Corp. of Philadelphia, Pa for $2,600,000 with the contract being completed on 16 January 2001.

== Awards, citations and campaign ribbons ==
Navy Meritorious Unit Commendation (with one bronze service star)
Coast Guard Meritorious Unit Commendation (with one gold award star)
Navy "E" Ribbon (3)
Navy Expeditionary Medal
National Defense Service Medal
Humanitarian Service Ribbon
Sea Service Deployment Ribbon (10 total)
Coast Guard Special Operations Service Ribbon (with three bronze service stars) – Coast Guard LEO (Law Enforcement Operations) 1987–1988
