= Taisia Korotkova =

Russian artist (born 1980)

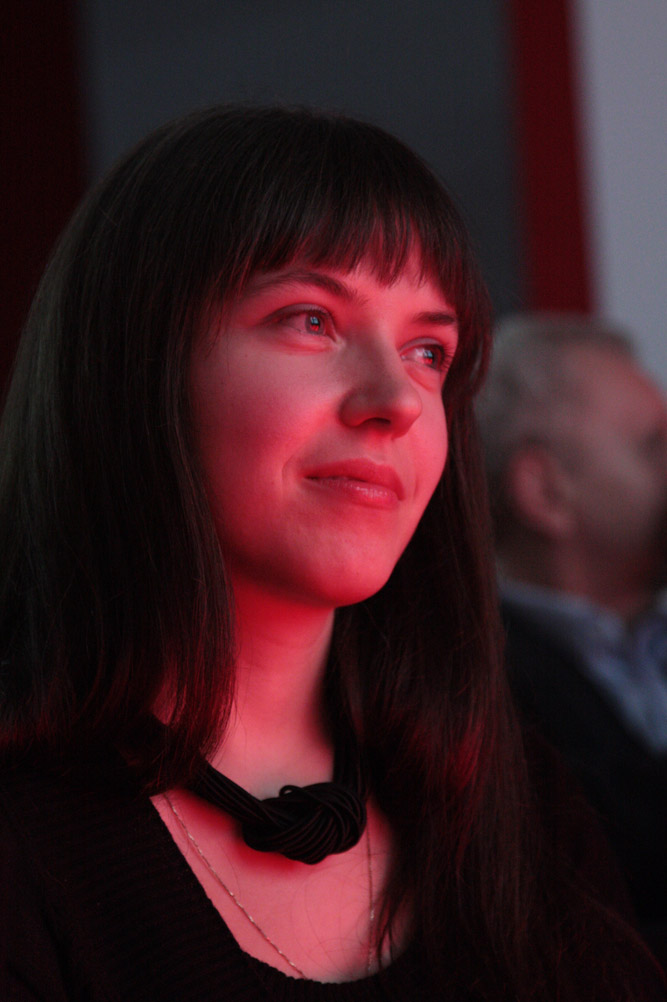
- Korotkova in 2009
- Born: June 19, 1980 (age 45); Moscow, USSR
- Education: Moscow Academic Art Lyceum, Moscow State Academic Art Institute named after Surikov, Institute of Contemporary Art
- Occupation: Contemporary Art

Taisia Nikolaevna Korotkova (born June 19, 1980, in Moscow) is a Russian artist. She studied in the Moscow Academic Art Lyceum from 1991 until 1998 and graduated from the Moscow State Academic Art institute named after V.I Surikov in 2004. Korotkova graduated from the Institute of Contemporary Art in Moscow in 2003. In 2010, she won the Young Artist of the Year award, a Kandinsky Prize. Korotkova takes part in Russian and International exhibitions. Her works are in the collections of the Moscow Museum of Modern Art, Benetton Foundation, Republic of Austria, the Smirnov & Sorokin Foundation and the Institute of Russian Realist Art.

== Work ==
The main questions she works on are about the relationships between human society and contemporary science, industry and technologies. The main technique of her works is tempera on gesso, on wooden panel.

== List of exhibitions ==
=== Personal shows ===
- 2007 “Technology”, Teatergalleriet, Uppsala, Sweden
- 2008 “Technology”, Moscow Museum of Modern Art, Russia
- 2011 “Reproduction”, Tulsky necropolis museum, Tula, Russia

“Beauty of Science” Gabarron foundation museum, Valladolid, Spain.

- 2011 “Reproduction” Salon Vert London, England. Colourblind gallery Koeln, Germany. Art and Space Gallery Munich, Germany.
- 2012 “Reproduction” Triumph gallery, Moscow, Russia
- 2013 “Light Echo” NK Gallery, Antwerpen, Belgium
- 2015 “CLOSED RUSSIA” Triumph gallery, Moscow, Russia

=== Group shows ===
- 2003 “Lifshitz”, ArtKLJAZMA, Festival of the Open-Air Art, Moscow region, Russia
- 2004 Rap-opera - Discussion about “Phenomenology of the soup can”, STELLA ART gallery, Moscow, Russia
- 2006 “Moscow News”, Critic's gallery, Prague, Czech Republic
- 2010 “Swedish Family” Uppsala Konstmuseum, Sweden
- 2011 “REWRITING WORLDS” The 4-th Moscow Biennale of Contemporary Art, Russia
- 2013 “Dreams for those who are awake”, Moscow Museum of Modern Art, Moscow, Russia
- 2013 “Department of labor and employment”, State Tretyakov's Gallery, Moscow, Russia
- 2013 “Lenin the Icebreaker”, Icebreaker Lenin, Murmansk, Russia
- 2014 “Lenin the Icebreaker”, Lentos kunstmuseum, Linz, Austria
- 2015 “New Storytellers in Russian Art of XX-XXI centuries” Russian museum St. Petersburg, Russia
- 2015 "Cinema of repeat film" Special project of 6th Moscow Biennale of Contemporary art, Russia
- 2016 «Metamorphoses» Schloss Pornbach, Germany
- 2017 «Future conversation» ABTART Gallery, Stuttgart, Germany
- 2017 «Attendance Time» NK Gallery Antwerp, Belgium
- 2017 «New Literacy» the 4th Ural Industrial Biennial, Ekaterinburg, Russia
