= Richard George Voge =

Richard George Voge Jr., (4 May 1904 – 17 November 1948), was an officer in the Submarine Service of the United States Navy. Most civilians "did not realize that he was one of the foremost world authorities on underseas warfare, that he had figured in some of the most thrilling episodes of the vast conflict in the Pacific, or that he had been decorated, with citations drawn in the most laudatory terms, by Admiral Chester Nimitz and the President of the United States."

== Early life ==
Voge was born in Chicago, Illinois, the son of Harriet Fish and Richard George Voge, Sr. He completed the course at Harrison Technical High School in Chicago in 1921, and entered the Naval Academy later that year, graduating on June 4, 1925 with high honors and receiving his ensign's commission.

== Early naval career ==
He attended the New London Submarine School, graduating first in his class. His first assignment was three years in the armored cruiser Pittsburgh (CA-4). In early 1929, Voge returned to the United States from the Far East to attend the Naval Submarine School at Naval Submarine Base New London, Connecticut. After completing that course and qualifying for submarine duty, he spent the bulk of his remaining time at sea in submarines, including the following pre-World War II assignments:

- January 1931 through June 1932: S-29
- July 1932 to September 1933: war plans and intelligence training at the Great Lakes Naval Training Station.
- September 1933 through June 1935: Instructor in Marine Engineering at the Naval Academy.
- June 1935 until May 1937: Command of S-18
- May 1937 through August 1937: Command of S-33
- August 1937 through September 1939: Naval Ordnance Plant at Baldwin on Long Island
- September 1939 to late January 1940: A four-month tour of duty as commissioning executive officer of the destroyer Rowan (DD-405)

In mid-February 1940, Commander Voge returned to the Asiatic Fleet and assumed command of the submarine Sealion (SS-195), based at Cavite in the Philippines, and commanded that submarine until the opening day of American participation in World War II.

== World War II ==
At the outbreak of hostilities on 8 December 1941 (West Longitude Time), Voge suffered the double ignominy of having his command caught in overhaul and, three days later, of losing her to enemy bombs while still at Cavite Navy Yard. Voge, however, quickly recovered from that blow, assumed command of Sailfish (SS-192) (formerly named Squalus) on 17 December, and led her on five successful war patrols during the first eight months of 1942. Until the Battles of Coral Sea and of Midway in May and June, respectively, only Pacific Fleet submarines like Sailfish were able to fight to impede the Japanese onslaught; and their war patrols provided the one bright spot for the Allied cause in the Pacific.

In August 1942, upon the completion of his fifth war patrol in Sailfish, Voge received orders to join the staff of Commander, Submarine Force, U.S. Pacific Fleet, as operations and combat intelligence officer. He retained that position, in which he was promoted to captain to date from 20 July 1943, until late in the war, when he was ordered to Washington, D.C., to serve in the Office of the Chief of Naval Operations.

During World War II, at the behest of President Franklin Delano Roosevelt the United States military documented its own administrative and operational events for use in producing detailed, definitive histories to be completed after the war. As the United States Navy’s contribution, teams of officers produced a 300-volume series titled United States Naval Administrative Histories of World War II, so detailed it was declared “Top Secret” and not published. As part of the series, Captain Voge was assigned to supervise the definitive history of U.S. submarine activities in the war. He researched and wrote the history's sections dealing with Pacific Fleet submarines, while Lieutenant Commander Donald S. Graham, USN, wrote about the Atlantic Fleet and Commander William H. Hazzard, USN, wrote about the Southwest Pacific. Voge's two-volume, 672-page history, Submarine Commands, was finished in 1946.

== Military honors ==
Voge was awarded a Bronze Star in 1942 for a disabling attack on a heavily-escorted Japanese aircraft carrier. That same year he earned the Navy Cross for, as master of the U.S.S. Sailfish, sinking a large Japanese cruiser, and scoring two torpedo hits on another Japanese aircraft carrier, knocking it out of commission.

In April 1946, U. S. President Harry S. Truman awarded Voge the Distinguished Service Cross, saying "A forceful and inspiring leader, tireless and zealous in his devotion to duty, Captain Voge rendered distinguished and invaluable service toward the ultimate blockade of the enemy's empire and, in consequence, the neutralization of his ability to maintain a war machine." Voge's award also stated: "Captain Voge placed into operation the highly effective method by which our submarines have sought out and destroyed the enemy. In his intelligent analysis of Japanese ship movements and strategy, he was able to coordinate the operations of all submarines in the Pacific fleet with other forces, with the result that millions of tons of enemy merchant and combat shipping were sunk or damaged. He also contributed immeasurably to the inauguration and success of air-sea rescue operations in support of air strikes against the Japanese home islands."

== Retirement and death ==
On 1 November 1946, Captain Voge voluntarily retired from the Navy at the age of 42 and was promoted to the rank of rear admiral. He lived in Rye, New York, and then Port Chester, with his wife Alice Atkinson Voge and their daughter, Gretchen. He became president of the Port Chester Fuel Company (which he renamed Sound Shore Fuel Corporation) and the Monolith Company, a concrete construction firm.

A little more than two years after he left the Navy, Voge suffered a coronary thrombosis in his home and died at the United Hospital at Port Chester, New York.

== See also ==
- USS Voge (DE-1047)
