= Philip Keeney =

Philip Olin Keeney (1891–1962), and his wife, Mary Jane Keeney, were librarians who became part of the Soviet Silvermaster spy ring in the 1940s.

Keeney met Mary Jane when both were working as librarians at the University of Michigan in 1929. In 1931, he became head librarian and professor of library economy at Montana State University (now known as the University of Montana) at Missoula, where he made several improvements. By the mid-1930s, both Keeney and his wife were involved with left-wing political movements. In 1937, Keeney, although tenured, was summarily terminated after questioning book censorship by a local politician and supporting a proposal to revive a local chapter of the American Federation of Teachers. Supported by the American Civil Liberties Union and the American Association of University Professors, among others, Keeney brought a wrongful dismissal suit and, in 1939, the Montana Supreme Court ruled in his favor and mandated reinstatement. But, made ill by the stress, he soon resigned.

== Progressive Librarians Council ==
The Keeneys moved to Berkeley, California, where they became members of the Marin County CPUSA Club, according to Mary Jane's diaries. In 1939, the Keeneys founded the Progressive Librarians' Council (PLC). That year, the PLC endorsed for Librarian of Congress Archibald MacLeish, chairman in 1937 of the first open meeting of the Second Congress of the League of American Writers, which was "founded under Communist auspices in 1935," according to a 1942 report by President Roosevelt's Attorney General Francis Biddle. As he was not a librarian, the American Library Association (ALA) opposed MacLeish's candidacy, but when FDR made his appointment, the PLC candidate got the nod.

The PLC also smuggled money to Emilio Andrés, commissar of an army corps of the Soviet-backed Spanish Republican Army, in exile in France after the Spanish Civil War. During the Hitler-Stalin pact, the PLC sent a letter to FDR urging him not to aid Poland, France or the United Kingdom, all fighting for their lives under the Nazi onslaught. (The letter had been phrased in such a way that it appeared to be from the ALA, but that group sent the President its own missive clarifying that the PLC did not speak for the ALA.) Once the pact broke down, and Germany invaded the Soviet Union, the PLC altered its position, advocating American participation in the war.

== Allegations: Communist fronts and Soviet espionage ==
The Keeneys had a long list of political affiliations with alleged "Communist fronts" such as the Washington Book Shop, identified in 1944 by Biddle and in 1948 by Truman administration Attorney General Tom Clark as a subversive organization. In 1940, "Keeney and his wife were signed on apparently by the Neighbors,"—code name for Soviet military intelligence (GRU)—according to a 1944 report by NKVD agent Sergey Kurnikov.

== Government work ==
Despite Keeney's radical political views, activities in several "popular front" groups and socialization with numerous people involved in Soviet espionage activities, both he and his wife were able to obtain a variety of federal jobs between 1940 and 1947. Within months of the PLC's endorsement of MacLeish for Librarian of Congress, Keeney was working at the Library of Congress in Washington D.C., where he handled classified material. NKVD agent Jacob Golos allegedly met with him there.

After the United States became involved in World War II, Keeney transferred to the Office of the Coordinator of Information, which was later transferred to the Office of Strategic Services (OSS), precursor of the CIA. In a 1942 Venona cable discussing infiltration of OSS, "Maksim" (Rezident Vasily Zarubin, under cover as "Vasily Zubilin") in New York wrote to "Victor" (General Pavel Fitin, head of NKVD foreign intelligence) in Moscow, "KINI is being entrusted to our agentura," meaning that recruitment was being undertaken. A note from U.S. cryptographers states "KINI: If correct, probably Philip Olin KEENEY."

From 1943 to 1945, Keeney was Chief of the Document Security Section in the Foreign Economic Administration. His wife, meanwhile, worked in the Bureau of Economic Warfare. In 1945, Keeney was allegedly transferred from the GRU to the NKVD.

In late 1945 he was hired as a social science researcher in the Supreme Command for the Allied Powers (SCAP) in Tokyo in occupied Japan. Later, designated "Libraries Officer" in the SCAP Civil Information and Education Section, he played an important role in promoting the revival and reform of library services in Japan. He negotiated the return of library buildings requisitioned by the Military Government and fostered the renewal of the Japan Library Association. His memorandum "Unified Library Services for Japan" of 8 April 1946 (aka The Keeney Plan) was a set of recommendations based on the California County Library System and stimulated discussion of new library legislation, but was very incompletely reflected in the eventual Library Law of 1950.

His wife worked in France for the Allied Staff on Reparations. Both Keeneys had numerous contacts with Soviet agents and sought to provide them with information, exerting "considerable effort" seeking to "contribute something of value to the Soviet cause in which they believed..."

== Investigations ==
In 1942 J. Edgar Hoover, Director of the Federal Bureau of Investigation, demanded that Keeney be fired from the Library of Congress as a subversive. After investigating the Librarian, Archibald MacLeish, concluded that there was no evidence to support the charge; when challenged, Hoover did not provide any, and Keeney was retained.

In 1946, the State Department prepared a Top Secret chart identifying 124 loyalty or security cases on the department payroll. Later that year, State Department official Samuel Klaus prepared a 106-page confidential memo summarizing security data on each of the cases listed on the chart. One of these was Mary Jane Keeney.

A 1946 congressional report named Keeney's wife, and in 1947 both lost their federal jobs and were denied passports. Within three months, Keeney attempted to leave the country without a valid passport, on the same Polish ship on which Comintern agent Gerhardt Eisler had escaped to the East bloc; the lawyer who encouraged him in this unsuccessful attempt to leave the country was Eisler's attorney.

During the Judith Coplon spy trial that year, FBI surveillance records were published that implicated Keeney's wife as a courier for the Communist Party, observed upon her return from France in 1946 delivering a manila envelope to Bernstein, which he in turn delivered to Alexander Trachtenberg. Mary Jane herself admitted associating with Nathan Gregory Silvermaster and William Ludwig Ullmann. In 1949, Keeney was a sponsor of the National Conference on American Policy in China and the Far East and the Scientific and Cultural Conference for World Peace, both arranged by the National Council of the Arts, Sciences, and Professions, cited as subversive by the California Committee on Un-American Activities. Despite all this, by the following year, Mary Jane was working in the Document Control Section of the United Nations secretariat.

After Sen. Joseph McCarthy publicized this in his 1950 speech in Wheeling, West Virginia, she was dismissed. The Keeneys refused to answer questions regarding membership in the Communist Party. In 1952, they were convicted of contempt of Congress for refusing to answer questions before a Senate committee; their convictions were reversed on appeal.

== Later life ==
In their later years, the Keeneys are variously reported to have founded and run a cinema club in Washington, D.C. between 1952 and 1958, showing art films, and reportedly opened a beatnik theatre in Greenwich Village called Club Cinema to show mostly foreign-language films with subtitles, with occasional folksingers or poetry readings. Keeney died in 1962 at the age of 71. He was survived by his wife.

== Venona ==
After the National Security Agency declassified the Venona project in 1995, John Earl Haynes, Cold War historian in the Manuscript Division of the Library of Congress, identified Philip Keeney with the code name "Bredan."

== Sources ==
- John Earl Haynes and Harvey Klehr, Venona: Decoding Soviet Espionage in America, Yale University Press (1999).
- Philip Olin Keeney Papers. University of California, Berkeley. Bancroft Library MSS 71/157.
- Rosalee McReynolds, The Progressive Librarians Council and Its Founders https://web.archive.org/web/20060821215531/http://libr.org/pl/2_McReynolds.html
