= Mary Jane Keeney =

American librarian (1898–1969)

Mary Jane Keeney (1898–1969) and her husband Philip Olin Keeney were librarians and charter members of the liberal The Progressive Librarians Council. She worked at the Board of Economic Warfare in Washington D.C. during World War II. In November 1945, Keeney travelled to Europe to work with the Allied Staff on Reparations.

She was alleged to be passing information to the Soviet Union through Joseph Milton Bernstein. After the war Keeney worked at the United Nations. Deciphered Venona cables and her own diaries confirm that Keeney and her husband, Philip Keeney, both worked for the Soviet GRU. Keeney's diary details that Sergey Kurnakov became their new KGB handler.

In February 1950, Senator Joseph McCarthy accused Keeney of being a member of the Communist Party, rather than an agent serving a foreign government. By the end of 1950, Keeney lost her position with the United Nations. In November 1952, she was ordered to stand trial by U.S. district judge Edward M. Curran for contempt of Congress. She had previously believed an oath taken by United Nations employees prevented her from testifying about her activities with the agency. On March 20, 1953, she was convicted by a jury, with a $250 fine and received a suspended one-year sentence for contempt of Congress. However, in April 1955, this was overturned on appeal.

The Keeneys then opened a theatre in Greenwich Village called Club Cinema, mostly to show foreign-language films, with occasional live performances. Mary Jane died in 1969 at the age of seventy-one. She was preceded by her husband.

== Sources ==
- Haynes, John Earl; Klehr, Harvey (2000). Venona: Decoding Soviet Espionage in America. New Haven, Connecticut: Yale University Press. ISBN 0-300-08462-5.
- McReynolds, Rosalee (January 31, 1991). "The Progressive Librarians Council and Its Founders". Progressive Librarian (2): 23. Archived from the original on August 21, 2006.
- McReynolds, Rosalee; Robbins, Louise S. (2009). The Librarian Spies: Philip and Mary Jane Keeney and Cold War Espionage. Praeger. ISBN 978-0-275-99448-8.
