= Enos Regnet Wicher =

Enos Regnet Wicher was an American professor of physics at Columbia University. He had been married to Rae Kidd, future star of the 1938 nudist movie "The Unashamed," while both were students at the University of Wisconsin 1935-37. During World War II he worked in the Wave Propagation Group at Columbia's Division of War Research and was alleged to have spied for Soviet intelligence with code name "Keen" (also "Kin").

He was married to Maria Wicher and the stepfather of Flora Wovschin, the most active Soviet spy revealed in the Venona project.

Unofficially extradited to Mexico, Enos Wicher taught at Mexico City College.

He joined the faculty of Harvey Mudd College in 1961 and taught there until 1975.
