= Society for Technical Aid to Soviet Russia =

The Society for Technical Aid to Soviet Russia was organised in May 1919 by Russian émigrés in New York City, United States. Similar societies were set up elsewhere in the US and Canada. The aim of the Society was to promote the rehabilitation of the Russian SFSR economy by sending skilled workers and technicians.

In 1920 in New York the organization attempted to incorporate under the name: "Institute for Industrial and Technical Aid to Soviet Russia," but was denied by the New York Supreme Court. "The application for incorporation gave as the object of the society 'the mental, cultural and technical development of the members of the Russian colony in the United States.' ... Justice Tierney said: 'We have no colonies in the United States and a sentiment to the contrary is not to be encouraged.' "

The first congress of the societies for technical aid to the Russian SFSR was held in New York from July 2–4, 1921; it united local societies in several American and Canadian cities into a single Society for Technical Aid to Soviet Russia. From the end of 1921 to October 1922, the Society sent to the Russian SFSR seven agricultural, two construction and one mining communes and a number of groups which brought with them equipment, seeds and foodstuffs worth nearly $500,000. The Society was extending its activity, and by 1923 it had more than 75 branches with over 20,000 members. Its second congress in June 1923 adopted a decision to intensify its work of organising and sending in communes and preparatory groups of skilled workers to Russia. The Society continued its active economic aid until 1925.
