= Zalmond Franklin =

Second world war Soviet agent

Zalmond David Franklin or Salmond Franklin was a Communist Party of the United States member and KGB asset during World War II. Zalmond was married at one time to KGB operative Sylvia Callen. According to the testimony of Louis Budenz, Zalmond did "secret work" in Spain during the Spanish Civil War, and he also worked part of the time as a bacteriologist at a Spanish Loyalist hospital. Upon returning in the late 1930s, Zalmond is alleged to have been recruited for anti-Trotsky work and was sent on several missions to Canada on behalf of Soviet intelligence. He worked as a security guard at the Soviet Pavilion in the 1939 New York World's Fair, sharing this work with two of his former comrades from the International Brigade, Morris Cohen and Milton Wolff. He is reported to have worked in Alberta, Canada, in 1943. Michael Straight named Franklin in his FBI interview as one of his Soviet intelligence contacts.

In March 1942, Franklin met with Clarence Hiskey, Professor of Chemistry at Columbia University and a member of the CPUSA, in New York City. As they walked to the subway, Hiskey described the progress of the research that was then being undertaken at Columbia on the atomic bomb. "Imagine," he told Franklin, "a bomb dropped in the center of this city which would destroy the entire city." Hiskey would supply Franklin with classified material until he moved to the Metallurgical Laboratory at Chicago in October 1943. Then Hiskey, codenamed RAMSEY, would be handled by the GRU illegal Arthur Adams.

Franklin is referenced in the 26 May 1944 Venona project decrypt. It is a report from Bernard Schuster describing a complaint from Nathan Einhorn about Franklin. Franklin had married Rose Richter after divorcing Sylvia Callen a year earlier. Einhorn's wife, Frieda and Rose Richter were sisters. Einhorn was complaining to Schuster that Zalmond was bragged too much about his contact with Soviet intelligence. Einhorn believed this affected operational security. According to the cable Schuster was keeping an eye on Franklin in case of more insecure talk. Shortly afterward, Franklin was removed from active work.

== Venona ==
Zalmond Franklin codenamed CHEN, possibly in error, is referenced in the following Venona project decrypt:

- 749 KGB New York to Moscow, 26 May 1944.

Anatoly Gorsky's December 1948 "Memo on Compromised American Sources and Networks" gives CHAP as Franklin's codename. CHAP appears in the following decrypts:

- 1003 KGB New York to Moscow, 18 July 1944.
- 1328 KGB New York to Moscow, 15 September 1944.
- 1430 KGB New York to Moscow, 10 October 1944.
- 1523 KGB New York to Moscow. 27 October 1944.
