= Ricardo Setaro =

Ricardo Manlio Leonidas Setaro (1903–1975) was an Argentinian who served as deputy chief of the Latin American department of CBS Radio during World War II and maintained a covert relationship with Soviet intelligence, including Iosif Grigulevich. Setaro entered the United States in 1942 to study journalism. He had previously operated a news agency in Buenos Aires which distributed TASS News Agency dispatches. A 1943 deciphered Venona message identifies Setaro as a courier for KGB funds which list as expenditures "maintenance of the Apparat" and "operational work".

A 1944 New York KGB message to Moscow stated,

Setaro is working as deputy chief of the Latin American department of the Columbia Broadcasting System. He was used by us earlier for the most part on liaison with Arthur, as a meeting point for couriers. At the same time we used him on the processing of Latin American (seventeen groups unrecoverable) as a CPUSA member. We are using him here on the processing of the CBS and of the diplomatic representation of the United States in the Latin America.

"Processing", in KGB parlance, means obtaining background information. Setaro is associated with the Council for Pan American Democracy, a group listed in the March 1948 Federal Register vol. 13 list of subversive organizations, commonly known as the Attorney General's List.

After leaving CBS Setaro was employed for a short period with Nicola Napoli by Artkino Pictures, Inc., the sole distributing agent in the Western Hemisphere for Soviet films. In 1947 he returned to Argentina and edited a Communist newspaper.

== Venona ==
Setaro's cover names assigned by Soviet intelligence and deciphered by NSA cryptographers are GONETS (translated means EXPRESS MESSENGER or COURIER), JEAN, and ZHAN. Setaro is referenced in the following Venona project decryptions:

764, 765 KGB New York to Moscow, 24 May 1943; 886 KGB New York to Moscow, 9 June 1943; 967–968 KGB New York to Moscow, 22 June 1943; 1234 KGB New York to Moscow, 29 August 1944; 1403 KGB New York to Moscow, 5 October 1944.

Ricardo Manlio Leonidas Setaro (1903–1975) [alias "Leonidas Labanca"] Ricardo Setaro, born on January 1, 1903, in the Argentine province of Mendoza, was attracted in his youth by the modern city of Buenos Aires. There he enjoyed its cosmopolitan activities. He had actively participated at an early stage in both journalism and literature.

Later he was active in the movie industry, but it were those early activities in which he excelled.

When he moved to Buenos Aires, he joined the Martin Fierro Literary Group. He worked for several newspapers of the capital and his home province, and he finally joined the team at the newspaper Critica, where he excelled and had many friends. Representing Critica he was correspondent to the war fronts of Paraguay [Chaco War] and Spain [Civil War].

Upon returning to his country he was appointed Director of the newspaper La Nueva España, local spokesman that supported the Spanish Republic. Additionally, he was Editor Director of the newspaper La Hora. He was also press correspondent for the newspapers La Novela Semanal, Los Andes (de Mendoza), Reconquista, Nueva Revista, El País (Córdoba), El Atlántico (B. Blanca), El Popular, La Opinión Cultural, El Líder, Daily Worker, Harpers Magazine, Inter-Continent News (US) and "Die Welt (El Mundo) y La Voz de Madrid (Spain). He also wrote a large number of articles for various newspapers and magazines of his country and abroad about many topics.

As a result of his professional experience at the Paraguay-Bolivia war he publishes in 1935 "Imágenes secretas de la guerra del Chaco" [secret images of the Chaco war], 1935 y "Secretos de Estado Mayor" [Secrets of the Joint Chiefs of Staff], 1936. Later he wrote "La vida privada del periodismo" [private life of journalism].

During the Second World War he informed the regional Spanish speaking audience about its events from the "Cadena de las Américas", short wave radio of the Columbia Broadcasting System, in New York, USA. Later he was deputy chief of the Latin American department of CBS Radio during World War II. He also attended the International House in New York City in 1942. At the University of Columbia, in NY, he studied Journalism. He also wrote two articles for Harpers magazine on the situation in Argentina as a result of the 1943 Revolution conducted by the nationalist GOU Group and Gral. JD Peron.

In literary fiction, a type which he developed successfully, he wrote "El alma que se apresuró", of which the Newspaper La Nacion of Buenos Aires said in 1928 that it showed a flexible talent, somehow mocking and deep, but not ordinary. He also published "El degollador de fantasmas".

In cinema, he produced the movies "Hombres a precio", about journalism in Argentina, Patrulla Norte, filmed in the Argentine province of Formosa about the activities of the border patrol (Gendarmería Nacional), "Mis cinco hijos" about the life of the five Alonso brothers and Violencia en la ciudad about crime in city, that was never released.

Setaro excelled in all his activities and he is remembered as belonging to a generation focused on addressing the key problems of the era. He died in 1975.
