= Sylvia Callen =

This article is part of the
Venona
series.
CPUSA
Socialist Workers Party
Mocase

Sylvia Callen Franklin, also known as Sylvia Lorraine Callen, and Sylvia Caldwell, (October 5, 1914 - January 22, 2012) was a young Chicago communist, recruited by Louis Budenz into the Communist Party USA's secret apparatus c. 1937.

Callen was assigned by Dr. Gregory Rabinowitz to go to New York City and infiltrate the Trotskyist Socialist Workers Party (SWP) using the pseudonym "Sylvia Caldwell". She became the secretary of James Cannon, who headed the SWP. Callen later testified to a federal grand jury about her infiltration of the SWP and about how she provided information from the SWP offices to Rabinowitz. Rabinowitz was later replaced by Jack Soble. She had been married for a time to Zalmond Franklin, who also served Soviet intelligence. For a time, she was also known as Sylvia Lorraine Doxsee.

Callen is identified in Venona traffic under the cover name SATYR. Venona messages reveal Callen giving copies to the KGB of SWP correspondence, intimate information on Leon Trotsky's widow, Natalia Sedova, and financial reports of Trotskyist groups.

When Budenz later defected, he named Callen as a Stalinist infiltrator but her SWP comrades refused to believe him. In 1954, Callen, then known as Sylvia Doxsee and living in Chicago, was called before a grand jury. Invoking the Fifth Amendment, she refused to answer questions about her membership in the SWP, her relationship with the KGB, Louis Budenz, or anything else. She was called back to another grand jury in 1958. This time, she was more cooperative, confessing that she met regularly with Rabinowitz and Soble to pass on confidential Trotskyist material at an apartment rented by a woman named Lucy Booker. Callen was named as an unindicted co-conspirator when Robert Soblen was charged with espionage in 1960, but she never publicly testified.

Callen's grand jury testimony was first publicly released and her status as a GPU agent confirmed as part of the International Committee of the Fourth International's Security and the Fourth International investigation.

== Venona ==
The Venona project was a United States counterintelligence program initiated during World War II by the United States Army's Signal Intelligence Service (later absorbed by the National Security Agency), which ran from February 1, 1943, until October 1, 1980. It was intended to decrypt messages transmitted by the intelligence agencies of the Soviet Union (e.g. the NKVD, the KGB, and the GRU). Syvia Callen is referenced in the following Venona project decryptions, indicating that she worked for Soviet NKVD:

- 899 KGB New York to Moscow, 11 June 1943, p. 1
- 899 KGB New York to Moscow, 11 June 1943, p. 2
- 926 New York to Moscow, 16 June 1943
- 670 KGB New York to Moscow, 11 May 1944, p. 1
- 670 KGB New York to Moscow, 11 May 1944, p. 2
- 670 KGB New York to Moscow, 11 May 1944, p. 3
- 751–752 KGB New York to Moscow, 26 May 1944
- 851 KGB New York to Moscow, 15 June 1944, p. 1
- 851 KGB New York to Moscow, 15 June 1944, p. 2
