= Marion Schultz =

American spy for the soviet union

Marion Miloslavovich Schultz, also Marian Schultz was an asset of the New York KGB working within the immigrant community during World War II. Schultz was a Russian-born American citizen who worked as a mechanic in the Philadelphia Naval Shipyard and was the Chair of the United Russian Committee for Aid to the Native Country (Russian War Relief) and Slavic organizations. Schultz's cover name assigned by Soviet intelligence was 'LAVA'.

== Venona ==
Schultz is referenced in the following Venona project decrypt:

- 579 KGB New York to Moscow, 28 April 1944
- 1661–1662 KGB New York to Moscow, 28 November 1944
