= Maria Wicher =

Maria Wicher was married to Professor Enos Wicher and was the mother of Flora Wovschin. The family were all spies for the Soviet Union during the 1940s. Maria had previously been married to Dr. William A. Wovschin, Flora's father. Her code name in Soviet intelligence and in the Venona project is "Dasha".

== Sources ==
- Haynes, John Earl & Klehr, Harvey (2000). Venona: Decoding Soviet Espionage in America. Yale University Press. ISBN 0-300-08462-5.
