= Bolesław Gebert =

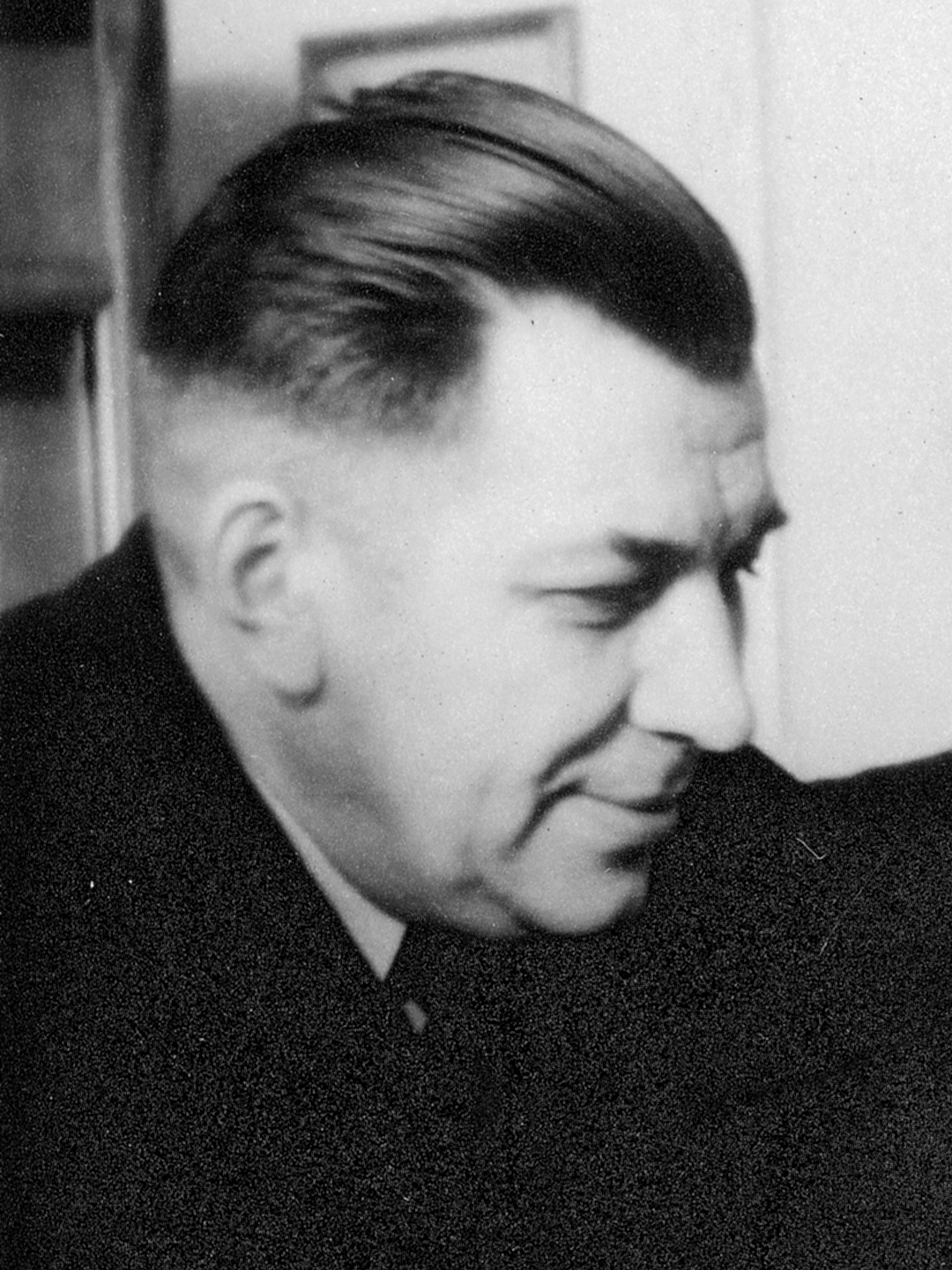
- Gebert in 1948

Polish Ambassador to Turkey
- In office 20 June 1960 – 12 September 1967
- Preceded by: Kazimierz Dorosz
- Succeeded by: Stanisław Piotrowski

Personal details
- Born: 22 July 1895 Tatary, Congress Poland, Russian Empire
- Died: 13 February 1986 (aged 90) Warsaw, Poland
- Resting place: Powązki Military Cemetery, Warsaw
- Party: Socialist Party of America (before 1919); Communist Party USA (1919–1945); Polish United Workers' Party (after 1945)
- Spouse(s): Elvira Koenig, Krystyna Poznańska-Gebert
- Children: 2, including Konstanty Gebert
- Education: Main School of Planning and Statistics

Bolesław Konstanty "Bill" Gebert (22 July 1895 – 13 February 1986) was a leading official in the Communist Party of America, remembered as one of the organization's top Polish-language leaders. He was a Soviet agent during World War II and later an official of the Polish People's Republic after the war.

== Background ==
Bolesław Konstanty Gebert was born July 22, 1895, in Tatary, near Tykocin, in the Białystok region, near the current border of Poland and Belarus. His family were farmers who lost their noble status and landed estates after Gebert's grandfather, Adolf Gebert, took part in the January Uprising in 1863–1864.

Gebert's father, Konstanty Gebert (1856–1941), was a soldier in the Polish Legions in World War I and later fought in the Polish–Soviet War, taking part in the defence of Warsaw. A farmer by trade, he was an active member of the peasant Polish People's Party "Wyzwolenie", for which he was imprisoned in 1923. He continued his military service during the Invasion of Poland in 1939 and was a prisoner of war in the Kozielsk Soviet camp. After his release, Konstanty Gebert was a member of the Home Army resistance movement during World War II, along with three of his four brothers, Mieczysław, Henryk, and Aleksander. The latter brother and Bill Gebert's uncle, Aleksander Gebert, was later persecuted for his resistance service by the Communists in post-War Poland.

== Career ==
Gebert immigrated from Poland to the United States prior to the Russian Revolution and found work as a miner.

=== Political career ===
By 1915, Gebert was an active member of the Socialist Party of America working in the SPA's Polish Federation. He took part in the creation of the Kosciuszko League. In 1919, he was active in the Left Wing Section of the Socialist Party and became a founding member of the Communist Party of the USA (CPUSA), for which he edited a Polish socialist newspaper. In the Palmer Raids at year-end 1919, he was arrested but not deported.

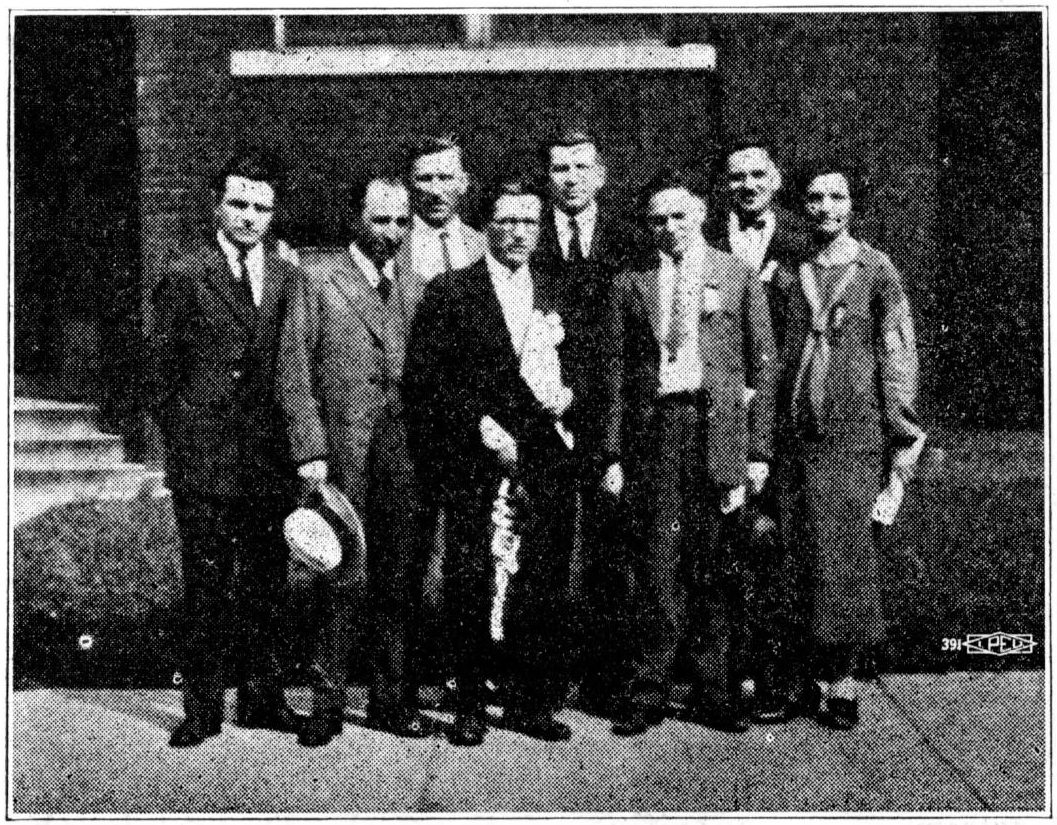
Gebert (fourth from right) among International Labor Defense language section workers, September 5–6, 1926

In 1920, Gebert was named to the governing Central Executive Committee of the CPA as an ostensible representative of the Polish Communist Federation in the wake of the deportation of Polish leader Daniel Elbaum. By that time, he was in Detroit, Michigan and editor of the three primary Polish-language publications: Głos Robotniczy (Workers' Voice), Trybuna Robotnicza (The Workers' Tribune), and Głos Ludowy (People's Voice). In 1929, he served as Secretary of the Polish Bureau of the Workers (Communist) Party and was a fraternal delegate to the party's 6th National Convention, held in New York City in March 1929.

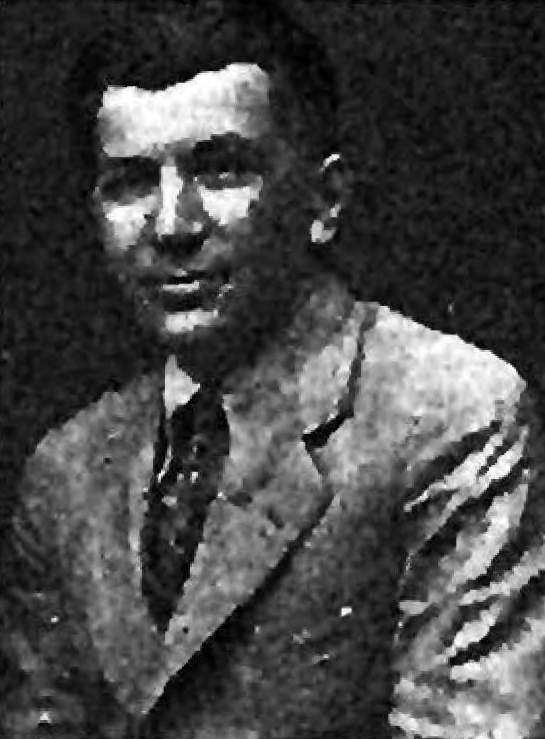
Gebert c. 1928

In 1932, Gebert co-founded the Polonia Society from an existing Polish-language section of the International Workers Order (IWO). He also became a national officer of the IWO. Up to the mid-1930s, he also served as organizer of the CPUSA's Chicago and Pittsburgh districts. (Later, Louis F. Budenz described of a conflict between Gebert and Morris Childs, District Organizer for Illinois, over Gebert's intrusion into Chicago and, in particular, over a "Czech comrade who was doing vital underground work for Gebert.")

In 1936 Gebert helped found the Steel Workers Organizing Committee (SWOC) of the Congress of Industrial Organizations (CIO), for which he organized fraternal organizations of foreign-born Americans. Toward year-end, he organized a conference of fraternal organizations in Pittsburgh — a gathering attended by 447 representatives of various national origins, addressed by Philip Murray and greeted by John L. Lewis.

During the 1930s, Gebert was a frequent contributor to the theoretical monthly of the CPUSA, The Communist.

Gebert appears in nine intercepted NKGB messages between May and October 1944. Gebert was the contact of fellow Soviet agent, Oskar Lange, a Polish economist who was a personal emissary from President Franklin D. Roosevelt to Joseph Stalin on the "Polish question". Another Venona message reports Gebert's demand for a $500 balance the KGB still owed him on a one thousand dollar contract to publish a Polish-language book.

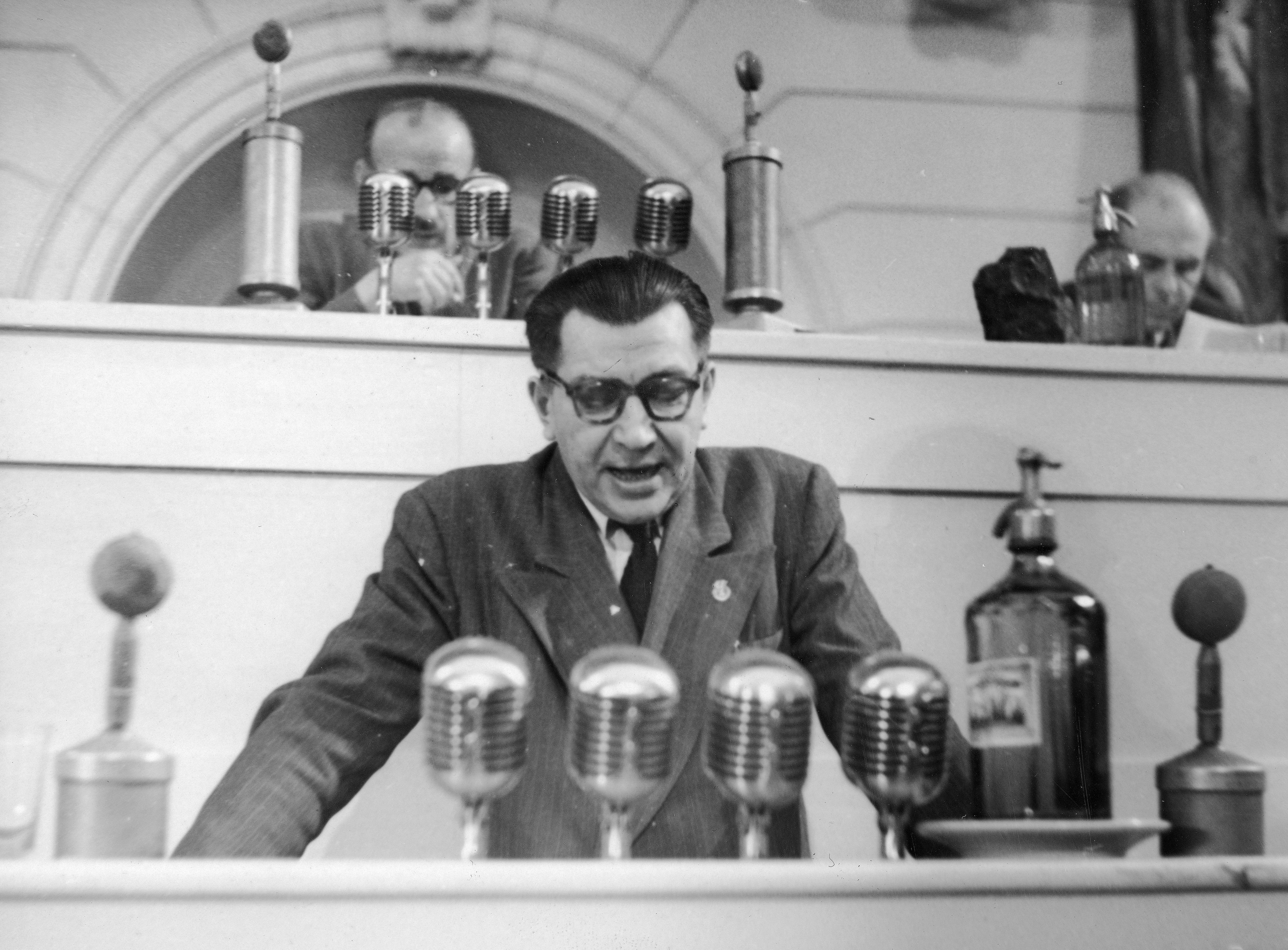
Gebert addresses the Unification Congress of the PPR and PPS, December 1948

After World War II, Gebert returned to the now Communist-dominated Poland, where he assumed a leading position in the state-controlled labor unions. From 1949 to 1950, Gebert was Secretary of the World Peace Council and from 1950 to 1957, the editor of Glosu Pracy.

He returned to the United States in 1950 as United Nations representative of the World Federation of Trade Unions.

From 1960 to 1967 Gebert served as the Polish People's Republic's Ambassador to Turkey.

=== Personal life and death ===
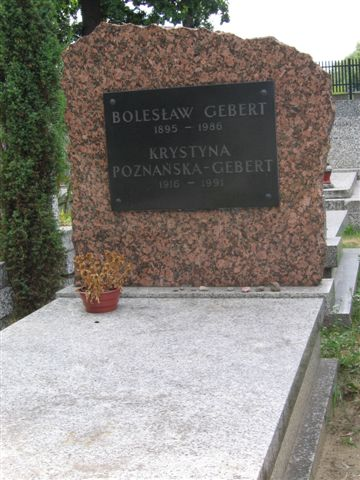
Bolesław Gebert grave

Gebert married two times. In 1920 in the US, he married Romanian-born Elvira Koenig (1898–1974); they had one son, Armand Gebert (1922–2009), a journalist who lived and died in Detroit. Later in Poland, he married Krystyna Poznańska-Gebert (1916–1991), of Jewish origin; they had two children: a daughter and son, Konstanty Gebert (born 1953), a Polish journalist and Jewish activist.

Gebert died age 90 on February 13, 1986, in Warsaw.

== Works ==
Books, Pamphlets

- Factionalism – the enemy of the auto workers (with William Weinstone) Detroit, Communist Party of Michigan 1938
- New Poland. Introduction by Arthur Upham Pope (New York: Polonia Society of the International Workers Order, 1945)
- For the Unity and Action of American Polonia (New York: Polonia Society of the International Workers Order, 1947)
- In defense of peace and unity of the world trade union movement (Warsaw: Central Council of Trade Unions in Poland, 1949)
- The First Poles in the United States (Warsaw: Society for Communication with Emigration "Polonia", 1958)
- Five Hundred and Fifty Years of Diplomatic Relations Between Turkey and Poland (1965)
- Polacy w amerykańskich związkach zawodowych : notatki i wspomnienia (Poles in American Trade Unions. Notes and Recollections) (Kraków: n.p., 1976)
- Progressive traditions of Polish Americans (Warsaw: 1976)
- Z Tykocina Za Ocean (From Tykocin Beyond the Ocean autobiography) (Warszawa: Czytelnik, 1982)

Articles

- "The St. Louis Strike and the Chicago Needle Trades Strikes," The Communist 12:8 (1933), pp 800–809
- "Trotskyism, Vanguard of the Counter-revolutionary Bourgeoisie," The Communist, vol. 13, no. 1 (January 1934), pp. 62–71.
- "Check-Up on Control Tasks in the Chicago District," The Communist, vol. 13, no. 7 (July 1934), pp. 711–717.
- "The General Strike in Terre Haute," The Communist, vol. 14, no. 9 (September 1935), pp. 800–810.
- "Our Tasks in Developing Activity Within the Company Unions," The Communist, vol. 15, no. 1 (January 1936), pp. 47–57.
- "The United Mine Workers' Union Convention," The Communist, vol. 15, no. 3 (March 1936), pp. 211–219.
- "The Steel Workers Give Their Mandate for Organization," The Communist, vol. 15, no. 6 (June 1936), pp. 498–507.
- "Smashing Through Barriers to the Organization of the Steel Workers," The Communist, vol. 15, no. 8 (August 1936), pp. 759–768.
