= Nikolai Korotkov (footballer) =

Russian footballer

Personal information
- Full name: Nikolai Nikolayevich Korotkov
- Date of birth: 1893
- Date of death: 1954 (aged 60–61)
- Position: Defender

Senior career*
Years	Team	Apps	(Gls)
1911–1913	Novogireyevo Moscow		
1914	Union Moscow		
1915–1918	Novogireyevo Moscow		
1919–1920	Mamontovka Moscow		

International career
1914	Russia	1	(0)
- * Club domestic league appearances and goals

Nikolai Nikolayevich Korotkov (Russian: Николай Николаевич Коротков) (1893–1954) was an association football player.

== International career ==
Korotkov played his only game for Russia on 5 July 1914 in a friendly against Sweden.
