= Tatary, Podlaskie Voivodeship =

Tatary
- Village
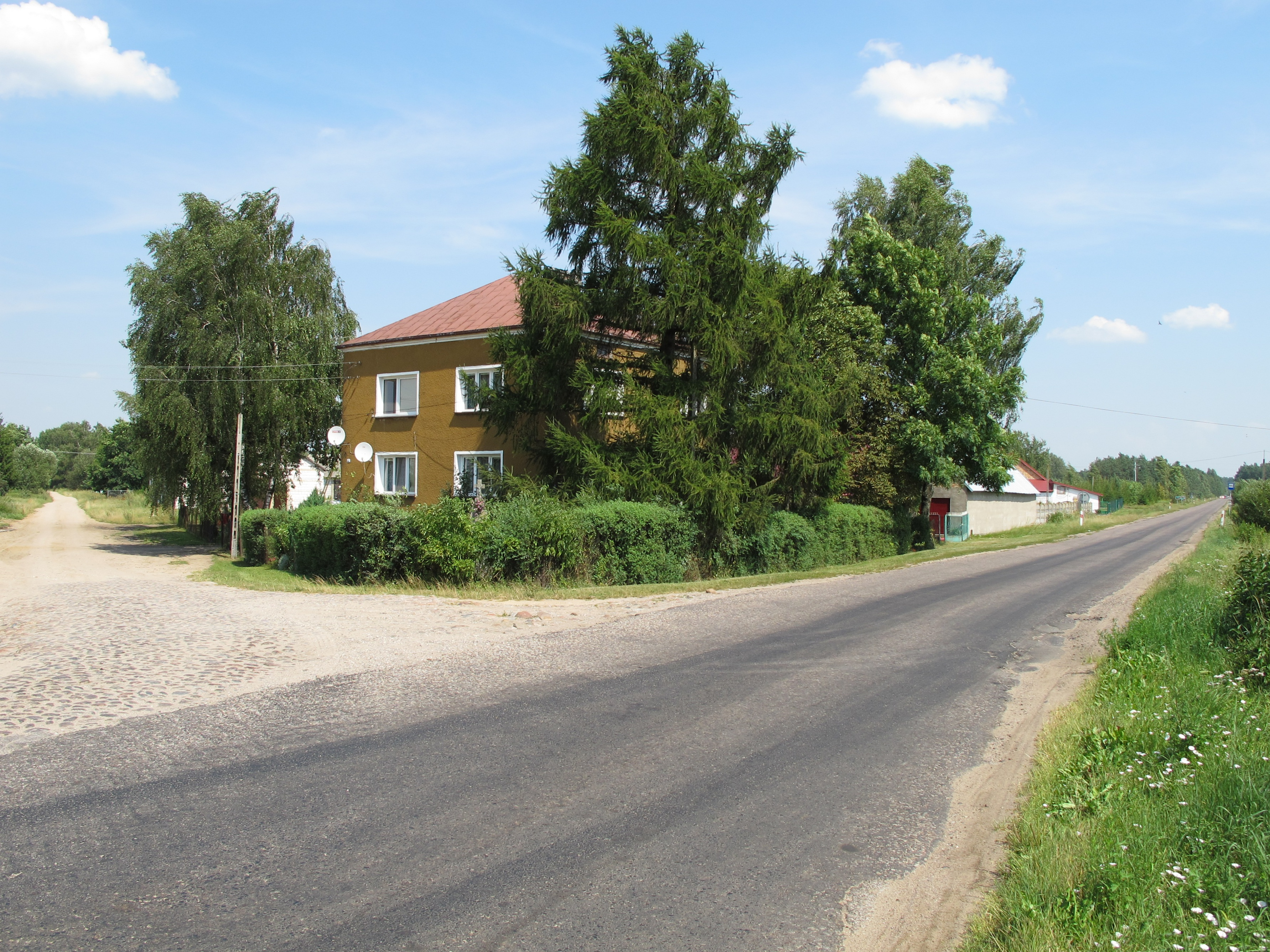

- Location within Poland
- Coordinates: 53°14′N 22°47′E
- Country: Poland
- Voivodeship: Podlaskie
- County: Białystok
- Gmina: Tykocin

Tatary [taˈtarɨ] is a village in the administrative district of Gmina Tykocin, within Białystok County, Podlaskie Voivodeship, in north-eastern Poland.
