= Augustina Stridsberg =

American writer and Soviet spy

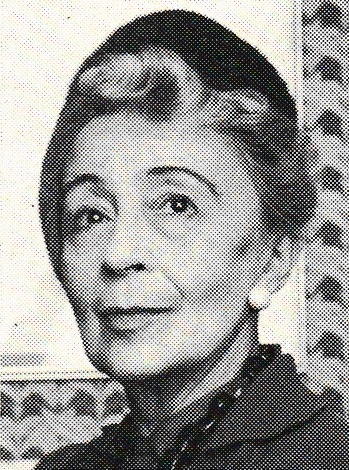
- Born: 1892
- Died: 1978 (aged 85–86)
- Occupations: Writer, interpreter, translator
- Children: Margietta Voge
- Espionage activity
- Allegiance: Soviet
- Codename: Klara

Augustina Stridsberg, formerly Augustina Jirku (1892–1978), was an American citizen, and the mother of Margietta Voge (née Jirku). Both mother and daughter worked for Soviet intelligence between 1943 and 1944. Stridsberg worked for the KGB San Francisco office. Her code name with Soviet intelligence, as deciphered by the Venona project, was "Klara".

Stridsberg was also a writer and an interpreter as well as a literary translator.
