= Joseph Milton Bernstein =

Joseph Milton Bernstein (September 30, 1908 – July 1975) was an American accused of spying for the Soviet Union and later confirmed as a Soviet agent by the US intelligence program Venona.

== Background ==
Joseph Milton Bernstein was born on September 30, 1908, in Connecticut. He attended Yale University, where he joined the John Reed Club.

== Career ==
Bernstein allegedly recruited T.A. Bisson, who had stopped working at the Board of Economic Warfare (BEW) and began working in the Institute of Pacific Relations (IPR) and in the editorial offices of Bernstein’s periodical Amerasia. Bisson passed to Bernstein copies of four documents: (a) his own report for BEW with his views on working out a plan for shipment of American troops to China; (b) a report by the Chinese embassy in Washington to its government in China; (c) a brief BEW report of April 1943 on a general evaluation of the forces of the sides on the Soviet-German front; and (d) a report by the American consul in Vladivostok.

Bernstein is supposed to have functioned as the contact between Soviet Military Intelligence (GRU) and Philip Keeney of the Office of Strategic Services (OSS) and his wife, Mary Jane Keeney of the Board of Economic Warfare and later the United Nations.

In 1945 the Office of Strategic Services Security Division and the FBI searched the offices of the magazine Amerasia, which was suspected of holding classified government documents. The staff of the publication included accused Communist spies and agents, including Joseph Bernstein. In subsequent years, the case resulted in several convictions and a number of congressional hearings were held on the case.

Bernstein's code with the GRU and in the Venona project is "MARQUIS".

== Works ==
Books:

- Spotlight on the Far East, a handbook (1945)

Translations:

- Eugene Delacroix, his life and work by Charles Baudelaire (1947) translation
- Baudelaire, Rimbaud, Verlaine; selected verse and prose poems (1947) edited with an introduction by Bernstein
- Literature of the graveyard: Jean-Paul Sartre, François Mauriac, André Malraux, Arthur Koestler (1948) translation
- Passionate journey: a novel in 165 woodcuts by Frans Masereel with introduction by Thomas Mann (1948) translation

== External sources ==
- John Earl Haynes and Harvey Klehr, Venona: Decoding Soviet Espionage in America, Yale University Press
