= Michael Leshing =

Michael S. Leshing was an American citizen and the Superintendent of Twentieth Century Fox film laboratories in the 1940s. In 1945 he was one of five honored with an Academy Award for Technical Achievement for his laboratory work in color film processing.

During World War II, Leshing was linked to a covert relationship with Soviet intelligence. In 1943, a Venona project decryption reported that he provided the KGB's Technical Line intelligence documents and a formula for color motion pictures and other film-processing technology.

Leshing is referenced in the following Venona project decryption:

- 512 KGB San Francisco to Moscow, 7 December 1943.
