= Milton Schwartz (spy) =

Milton Schwartz was an American who worked for Soviet Military Intelligence GRU during World War II. A 1943 message, later decrypted by the Army Signals Intelligence Corp, revealed Schwartz's activity on behalf of the GRU to be of such value that a request was put in for $1200 to assist Schwartz in personal financial matters.

Schwartz's code name with the GRU, and deciphered by the Venona project is "Matvey".
