= Jack Fahy =

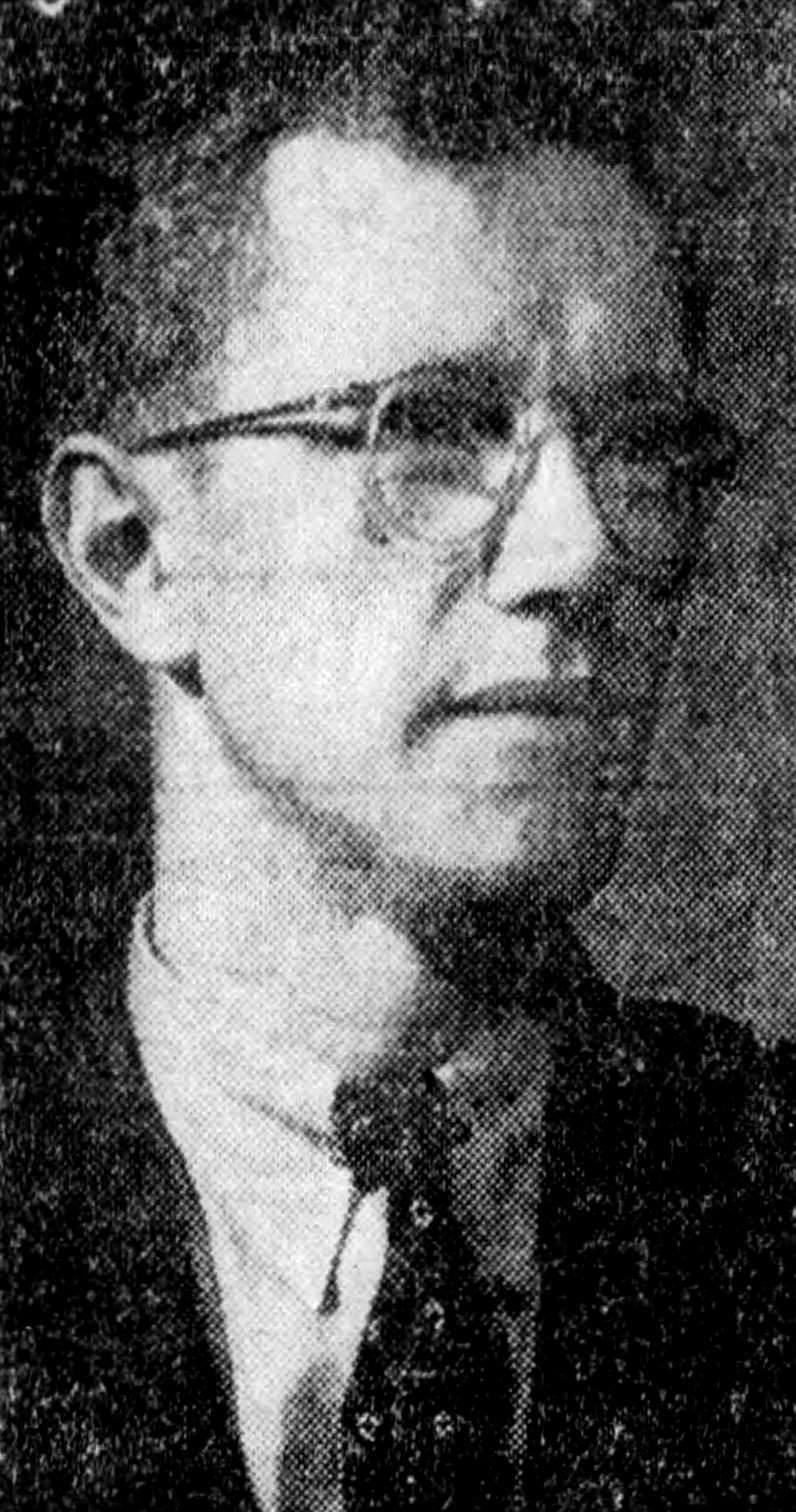
Fahy c. 1940

Jack Bradley Fahy (November 5, 1908 – July 1, 1947) was an American government official. He allegedly spied for the Soviet Naval GRU during World War II. Soviet naval intelligence was much smaller than the Red Army's GRU, and only a fraction of the size of the NKVD.

== Biography ==
Fahy was born in Washington D.C. in 1908 and grew up in New York City. His father was a senior partner at Walter J. Fahy and Co, a stock exchange firm. Fahy worked for Senator George H. Moses in the late 1920s. After the Stock Market Crash of 1929, Fahy became a Socialist.

Fahy studied at New York University, the Graduate Institute of International Studies in Geneva, San Marcus University in Peru, Black Mountain College in North Carolina, and Montana State University where he took courses in animal husbandry. Fahy established several small businesses during this time.

Fahy served in the International Brigades in the Spanish Civil War on behalf of the Socialist Party.

When Fahy returned to the U.S. after being wounded in the war in 1938, he publicly argued with Socialist Party leader Norman Thomas on policy differences over the Spanish Civil War, and resigned from the Party in an open letter published in the Communist Daily Worker. Afterward Fahy became Vice President of the Hemisphere News Service under Robert Miller, and they later hired Joseph Gregg to manage it. Gregg and Fahy had served together in Spain. The news service was absorbed into the Office of the Coordinator of Inter-American Affairs (CIAA) in 1941, an agency that coordinated diplomacy, propaganda and economic warfare in Latin America.

Fahy left the CIAA and joined the Board of Economic Warfare and held the position of Principal Intelligence Officer. In 1943 Fahy was about to become chairman of the Territorial Affairs Bureau in the Department of the Interior, Rep. Martin Dies, Jr. placed Fahy on a list of government employees suspected as being Communists. The Kerr Commission upon hearing Fahy's testimony agreed his involvement with the Socialist party was a "youthful misadventure" and concluded Fahy had been "loyal" and "has not been guilty of any subversive activity".

Fahy's alleged code name with the Soviet Naval GRU, "MAXWELL," was deciphered in the Venona project, although the value of these decryptions in identifying Soviet agents remains controversial. Venona transcripts allege that Fahy was transmitting information to the Soviet Naval GRU for money. The information Fahy transmitted was regarded in Moscow as very valuable. Moscow sent a message to the Washington Naval GRU to "communicate each item of information from Fahy on political questions to the Master [Soviet ambassador] and telegraph it to me with the post-script 'report to the Master'."

== Sources ==
- John Earl Haynes and Harvey Klehr, Venona: Decoding Soviet Espionage in America (New Haven: Yale University Press, 1999)
