= Eufrosina Dvoichenko-Markov =

Eufrosina Dvoichenko-Markov (1901–1980) was a Russian-American history and literary scholar identified by National Security Agency as agent Masha who worked for the New York NKGB Rezidentura from 1943 to 1945. Her son, Sgt. Demetrius Dvoichenko-Markov of the United States Army, is also identified by the Venona papers as a Soviet agent, but spent the rest of his life as an academician in the United States. Masha provided Soviet intelligence with information on Romanians, Carpatho-Russians, and other exile groups in the United States. Masha also provided information on United States Department of State personnel with whom she had contact.

She died in Moscow in 1980.

== Works ==
- Eufrosina Dvoichenko-Markov, Jefferson and the Russian Decembrists, American Slavic and East European Review, Vol. 9, No. 3. (Oct., 1950), pp. 162–168. JSTOR link
- Eufrosina Dvoichenko-Markov, The Pulkovo Observatory and Some American Astronomers of the Mid-19th Century, Isis, Vol. 43, No. 3. (Sep., 1952), pp. 243–246. JSTOR link
- Двойченко-Маркова Е. Русско-американская дружба во время Крымской войны//Морские записки. Том XII. No. 2. Нью-Йорк. 1954 г. С.3-18.
