= Marietta Voge =

American parasitologist and Soviet spy (1918–1984)

Marietta Voge, née Mariette Jirku (1918–July 1984) was a noted parasitologist, author and educator at the University of California, Berkeley.

Born in an area that became Yugoslavia soon after her birth, Voge received her Ph.D. in 1950 from UC Berkeley. She co-authored a textbook with Edward Markell on the subject of medical parasitology, now in its ninth edition as Markell and Voge's Medical Parasitology (ISBN 978-0721647937). At the time of its first publication in 1958, Voge was an assistant professor at the University of California, Los Angeles School of Medicine. Voge served in 1976 as president of the American Society of Parasitologists.

Voge was married to Noel Voge and was the daughter of Augustina Stridsberg, who worked for Soviet intelligence during World War II. Voge worked for the KGB's San Francisco office according to the Venona project reports.
