= Christina Krotkova =

American spy for the USSR

Christina Krotkova worked in the Office of War Information (OWI) during World War II. The OWI handled war news for domestic use and overseas propaganda. Krotkova's chief target was Soviet defector Victor Kravchenko. Haynes and Klehr have identified Krotkova as allegedly using several code names with Soviet intelligence whom she transmitted information to. At least seven Venona project transcripts refer to Kratkova. Haynes and Klehr identify Krotkova as code name "Zhanna", "Jeanne", "Ola", and "Ols". A difference of opinion arises on the latter two code names with Nigel West, who identifies "Ola" and "Ols" as being Sara Veksler, who also worked within OWI.

== Sources ==
- John Earl Haynes and Harvey Klehr, Venona: Decoding Soviet Espionage in America (New Haven: Yale University Press, 1999)
- Nigel West, Venona: The Greatest Secret of the Cold War (London: HarperCollins, 1999)
