= Flora Wovschin =

Soviet spy (born 1923)

- Born: Flora Don Wovschin; February 20, 1923; New York City, U.S.
- Disappeared: 20 September 1945 (aged 22)
- Status: Missing for 81 years, 1 month and 7 days
- Mother: Maria Wicher

Flora Don Wovschin (born 20 February 1923, disappeared 20 September 1945) was a suspected Soviet spy who later renounced her American citizenship. She is believed to have traveled to the Soviet Union in the late 1940s, but her fate and whereabouts are uncertain.

== Biography ==
Wovschin was born in New York City. Her mother was Maria Wicher and her stepfather was Enos Regnet Wicher. She attended Barnard College and the University of Wisconsin–Madison. At Barnard, she was active in the American Students Union. She attended Barnard College with Marion Berdecio and Judith Coplon, both of whom Wovschin later recruited into service for the NKVD.

From 9 September 1943 to 20 February 1945, she worked in the Office of War Information, then transferred to the Department of State. She resigned from the State Department on 20 September 1945. Wovschin acted as courier between Coplon and Soviet intelligence. Wovschin transmitted to the Soviet Union information that the Americans had somehow become aware of NKVD internal codenames for various American institutions, including CLUB, HOUSE, BANK and CABARET, as used in the NKVD's most secret communications.

After the war, she renounced her American citizenship and travelled to the Soviet Union in 1946 or 1947 where she married an engineer. An FBI counterintelligence report on Wovschin has a hand-written note in the margin stating she may have died serving as a nurse in North Korea. The Venona project dedicated to US counterintelligence states her code name in Soviet intelligence was "Zora".

== See also ==
- List of people who disappeared mysteriously: 1910–1990
