= Charles Flato =

American writer, American Communist Party member and a Soviet agent

Charles S. Flato (also Charles Floto) (May 27, 1908 – January 1, 1984) was an American writer, American Communist Party member and a Soviet agent.

Flato was employed by the United States government and spied for the Soviet intelligence during World War II. Flato suffered from polio as a child which left him with a hunchback and caused him to walk with a cane. He married Lucy Burman, also a Communist Party member.

From 1937 to 1941, Flato worked as an investigator and report writer for the Civil Liberties Subcommittee of the Senate Committee on Education and Labor chaired by Senator Robert M. La Follette, Jr., and the Foreign Economic Administration. He also served under Nelson Rockefeller in the Blockade and Supply Branch of the Latin American division of the Board of Economic Warfare during World War II.

He resigned from the government and moved to San Francisco about mid-July 1945. He is mentioned in Venona project transcript #588 of April 29, 1944. Flato's complicity in espionage was corroborated by information exhumed from the NKVD archives in the 1990s. He was also a member of the "Sound" and "Myrna" groups. His codename in the Gorsky memo is "Bob". In another Venona transcript, he is believed to be codename "Char".

Sometime in the 1950s, he and his wife divorced. By 1957, Flato had a cottage designed and built by the architect Serge Chermayeff. He lived alone in this cottage near a beach on Cape Cod and worked as a freelance writer throughout the 1960s and 1970s. In 1957, he was the editor of the Complete Home Improvement Handbook. He is known to have used at least one ghost writer in the form of a friend for an article printed in The Saturday Evening Post in the early 1960s. The Golden Book of the Civil War was a children's book written by Flato and published in 1961.

After the People's Republic of China resumed diplomatic relations with the United States, Flato wrote a six-part report on health care in China. The Chinese Medical Association invited him to travel through the country as their guest.

Flato was one of the co-founders of the Medical Pharmaceutical Information Bureau, and wrote and edited for the publication Hospital Practice. He was known to have also written scripts for medical documentaries.

Suze Rotolo kept close ties with Flato visiting him at his home on Cape Cod. He gave Suze his car before he died of kidney failure in Hyannis, Massachusetts, on January 1, 1984.

Only after the fall of the Soviet Union when the files of the KGB became open to researchers was it discovered that he was spying for the Soviets in the 1940s.

== Sources ==
- Venona: Decoding Soviet Espionage in America, John Earl Haynes and Harvey Klehr, Yale University Press (1999)
- Vladimir Pozniakov, NKVD/NKGB Report to Stalin: A Glimpse into Soviet Intelligence in the United States in the 1940s
- The Haunted Wood: Soviet Espionage in America – the Stalin Era, Allen Weinstein and Alexander Vassiliev, Random House, New York, 1999.
- Alexander Vassiliev's original Russian hand-written notes titled "A.Gorsky's Report to S.R. Savchenko, 23 December 1949".
- Washington Post, January 2, 1984.
- Chicago Tribune, January 4, 1984.
- United States Social Security Death Index.
- Contemporary Authors Online, Gale, 2006. Reproduced in Biography Resource Center. Farmington Hills, Mich.: Thomson Gale. 2006. http://galenet.galegroup.com/servlet/BioRC
