= Samuel Rodman (spy) =

Samuel Jacob Rodman (born c. 1898, date of death unknown), was an American double agent during World War II. Rodman was employed by the United Nations Relief and Rehabilitation Administration (UNRRA) and spied for the Soviet Union at the same time. Rodman was a member of the Communist Party of the United States (CPUSA), and his previous occupations were teaching and journalism.

Bernard Schuster was Rodman's contact with Soviet intelligence. Rodman was engaged in espionage on behalf of the Soviet Union while working in Yugoslavia for UNRRA.

== Venona ==
Rodman is referenced in the following Venona project decrypt:

- 1553 KGB New York City to Moscow, 4 November 1944; Gif file.
