= Jacob Golos =

Ukrainian-born American Bolshevik revolutionary

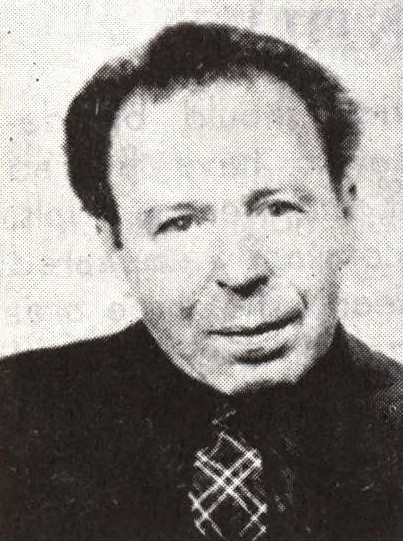
Golos in an undated photograph widely circulated following his death

Jacob Golos (born Yakov Naumovich Reizen, Russian: Яков Наумович Рейзен; April 24, 1889 – November 27, 1943) was a Ukrainian-born American Bolshevik revolutionary who became an intelligence operative in the United States on behalf of the USSR. A founding member of the Communist Party of the United States of America (CPUSA), circa 1930 Golos became involved in the covert work of Soviet intelligence agencies. He participated in procuring American passports by means of fraudulent documentation, and the recruitment and coordination of activities of a broad network of agents.

== Early years ==
Yakov Naumovich Reizen was born April 24, 1889, in Ekaterinoslav, Russian Empire, since 2016 known as Dnipro in Ukraine, to a Jewish family. Yakov's father worked as a shop assistant. In addition to Yakov, the Reizen family included two more sons and three daughters. Yakov was registered as Jacob Naumovich Golosenko (the entry in the register, Holy Trinity Church in the city of Ekaterinoslav).

A revolutionary from a young age, Reizen joined the Russian Social Democratic Labor Party (RSDLP) in 1904, becoming active in the group's Bolshevik wing headed by V.I. Lenin. He participated in the 1905 Revolution, serving as a member of the first soviet of Ekaterinoslav, the city known today as Dnipro.

In 1906 Reizen organized an illegal revolutionary printing press, for which he was arrested in the last days of that year. He was subsequently convicted and sentenced to eight years of hard labor, a term ultimately commuted by the government of Tsar Nikolai II to lifetime exile to Yakutia in northern Siberia.

== Emigration to America ==
Reizen escaped by fleeing to the east, traveling to the United States by way of China and via a ship from Japan. In the United States at some point, he adopted the surname "Golos," by which he would subsequently be known. In 1909 Golos reached San Francisco, California, where he obtained work in a print shop as a pressman.

By 1912, Golos had found his way to New York City, where he helped to raise funds for political prisoners in Russia. Golos was active in the Russian Socialist Federation, and in May 1915 gained membership in the Socialist Party of America when the Russian Federation joined that party.

Golos returned to California in 1917, where he supported himself by working for fruit picking and packing firms. He also worked as an organizer for the Socialist Party of California. He remained in California until 1919.

Toward the end of August 1919, Golos was elected to the Central Executive Committee of the Russian Federation by the organization's 5th Convention, held in Detroit, Michigan. Immediately after the close of the Detroit gathering, Golos and a number of his comrades in the Russian Federation, including Alexander Stoklitsky and Nicholas Hourwich, traveled to Chicago to attend another convention. This one established the Communist Party of America, forerunner of the Communist Party, USA.

In his personal history and personnel forms written in Moscow in 1926, Golos dated his work as a member of the Central Committee of the Russian Section (New York) as from 1919 to 1925. In December 1922, Golos was elected to the nine-member Bureau of the Russian Federation of the Workers Party of America, the "legal" public face of the then-underground Communist Party of America.

In 1921–1922, Golos worked as an organizer at the Communist Party HQ in Chicago. In 1922-1923 he was an organizer for the organization in its Detroit district. In 1923 Golos became head of the Society for Technical Aid to Soviet Russia, one of the party's technological aid initiatives; he worked in that capacity until 1926.

In 1926 Golos traveled to the Soviet Union as a participant in the American "Kuzbas" (Kuzbass Autonomous Industrial Colony), located near the Russian city of Kemerovo. His membership was transferred to the All-Union Communist Party (bolsheviks), the VKP(b), in this interval. When the Kuzbas project was essentially terminated in 1927, Golos was transferred to Moscow. There he was offered a job in a book publishing house.

In 1927 a Communist Party-sponsored travel agency, called World Tourists, Inc.s, was established. Golos would later become closely connected to it in the United States. Originally started as an economic venture intended to help subsidize the Communist Party's press, the firm ultimately served not only as the coordinator of propaganda tours to the Soviet Union but also as a means to facilitate the travel of party officials and Soviet agents between the USSR and the US, sometimes under the cover of falsified documentation.

In September 1928, American Communist Party leader Jay Lovestone, noting Golos' "significant influence among the Russian working masses in the United States," sent an appeal to the Central Committee of the VKP(b) to have Golos be returned to the United States for work. He made a second appeal along these lines in December 1928, and Golos returned to the United States around January 1929.

== Espionage activity ==
Golos settled again in New York City, this time in the borough of the Bronx. He worked as the business manager of Novyi Mir (New World), the Communist Party's Russian-language newspaper, based in New York. Included in Golos' activities was coordination of the CPUSA's operation to produce false passports for party members wanting to travel abroad. Golos remained in charge of the passport operation until turning the job over to Hungarian party functionary J. Peters, who also served as a link with the Soviet intelligence in 1930s. According to Peters' biographer the transfer took place in 1932.

In the spring of 1930, Golos became involved in the Communist Party's "machinery of investigations," charged with keeping tabs with the activities of a number of labor unions and party-affiliated mass organizations. He appears to have begun working for the secret intelligence apparatus of the Soviet Union by this time, as it was in 1930 that he is first referred to in archival documents as a "reliable man."

According to archival notes taken in the early 1990s by Alexander Vassiliev, a former KGB foreign intelligence officer and journalist, Golos' initial contact seems to have been with the GPU's New York station chief, Chivin ("Smith"). Another interpretation of the documents, favored by historian Svetlana Chervonnaya, argues that first contact was made by Abram Einhorn ("Taras"), a Soviet intelligence agent who worked in the United States from 1930 to 1934. It is clear that by the early 1930s, Golos was in the employ of Soviet intelligence.

By the start of 1933, Golos was heading the Communist Party's World Tourists venture, an operation that generated revenue and provided funds for various CPUSA activities. Golos was active in the acquisition and supply of American naturalization papers and birth certificates, which were used to obtain American passports to "legalize" Soviet intelligence agents around the world — initially in Europe and Asia, but later in the Americas as well. In order to convert these fraudulent application papers into authentic passports, Golos worked closely with a clerk in the Brooklyn passport office. That person had been recruited because of his vulnerability of a gambling addiction.

During this period Golos was identified by his Soviet intelligence handlers with the code name "Sound" — a pun on his adopted surname of Golos, the Russian word for "voice."

Throughout the 1930s Golos was a member of the CPUSA's Central Control Commission, a body in charge of party discipline, background investigations, and audits. He could assist in the recruitment and verification of potential agents on behalf of Soviet intelligence.

As head of World Tourists, Golos visited the Soviet Union every year from 1932 onward to attend the celebrations of the Bolshevik revolution of 1917. This coincidentally gave him an opportunity to bring his Russian-born wife and American-born son there in 1936, so that his son could receive "a Soviet education." In 1937, the pair gained Soviet citizenship.

The last of these visits took place in 1937, during the height of the Great Purge — the mass campaign of Soviet terror in which great numbers of Soviet citizens suspected of political disloyalty, espionage, or wrecking (sabotage) were arrested, of which thousands executed and much more were sent to the labor camps of the Gulag. Upon his return to the United States in January 1938, Golos confirmed at a session of the governing Political Committee of the American Communist Party that there was indeed a mass secret police operation in effect in the USSR. Golos' faith in the communist cause seems to have remained unshaken in the aftermath.

Vassiliev's notes revealed that in late 1940, Golos recruited author Ernest Hemingway, assigning him the code name: "Argo"; the author had offered to work covertly for the Soviets.

From 1940 onward Golos was subject to the Foreign Agent Registration Act. While he did not curtail his NKVD activities, he had to assume he was under FBI surveillance. Moscow became nervous at the risk of him being arrested and made attempts to convince him to return to Russia. Fully aware of Stalin's purges and terrified that returning to the Soviet Union would mean being sent to the Gulag or shot, Golos not only refused to share his sources with other NKVD officers, but he also told them that he had hidden a sealed envelope containing the details of the USSR's espionage operations in America.

In 1941, Golos had set up a commercial forwarding enterprise, called the U.S. Shipping and Service Corporation. He assigned Elizabeth Bentley, his assistant, courier and lover, as one of its officers. The pair occupied a suite in the Commodore Hotel, in New York City, across the street from Amtorg.

In 1942, Golos transferred a Communist cell of engineers recruited by Julius Rosenberg into direct contact with Soviet intelligence operatives in New York. The cell provided information on newest developments in electrical and radio engineering to the XY Line of the NKGB foreign intelligence. The XY Line accordingly began efforts to infiltrate the Manhattan Project, in an operation code-named ENORMOUS (ENORMOZ).

Sometime in November 1943, Golos met in New York with key figures of one of the so-called "information groups" of the CPUSA, which would come to be known as the Perlo group. Its members worked in several government departments and agencies in Washington, D.C. and provided classified information to the USSR through Earl Browder, the General Secretary of the Communist Party USA.

== Death and legacy ==
Golos suffered a series of heart attacks during the first years of the 1940s. On November 27, 1943, a fatal heart attack ended his life while he was sleeping with Elizabeth Bentley. Immediately Bentley began a search for a secret file that Golos had kept to protect himself from being recalled to Russia; she destroyed it. Following his death, Bentley took over Golos's espionage operations.

The code name Zvuk (Sound) appears in the Venona decryptions as a Soviet source; this has been identified as Jacob Golos. In these decrypts, Golos is identified as an "illegal colleague," generally meaning a Soviet officer or professional agent who operated without the protection of diplomatic or official status with a Soviet embassy or consulate. Soviet officers with the latter status were said to be "legal."

== See also ==
- History of Soviet espionage in the United States
- Silvermaster group
- List of Americans in the Venona papers
