= List of Eastern Bloc agents in the United States =

This is a list of people who have been accused of, or confirmed as working for intelligence organizations of the Soviet Union and Soviet-aligned countries against the United States. In some cases accusations are considered well-supported or were otherwise confirmed or admitted, but other cases are controversial or contested.

For more information, see:

== Czechoslovakia (StB) ==
- Karl Koecher, mole who penetrated the CIA

== Hungary ==
- Clyde Lee Conrad, U.S. Army NCO, betrayed NATO secrets.

== Poland ==
- Marian Zacharski, Polish Intelligence officer arrested 1981. Among other things, he won access to material on the then-new Patriot and Phoenix missiles, the enhanced version of Hawk air-to-air missile, radar instrumentation for F-15 fighter, "stealth radar" for B-1 and Stealth bombers, an experimental radar system being tested by U.S. Navy, and submarine sonar.

== Soviet Union ==
=== NKVD and KGB ===
==== NKVD ====
- Marion Davis Berdecio, friend of Judith Coplon and Flora Wovschin (stepdaughter of Enos Wicher) who all became involved in Soviet espionage at Columbia University
- Engelbert Broda, Austrian physicist, a main Soviet source of information on UK and U.S. nuclear research; ex-wife married Alan Nunn May
- Guy Burgess, recruited by Soviets at Cambridge; BBC producer; colleague of Kim Philby at UK embassy in D.C. before fleeing with Donald Maclean to USSR; led to major breach in "Special Relationship"; died in Moscow
- Boris Bukov, head of apparatus connected to Whittaker Chambers and Alger Hiss.
- Samuel Dickstein (congressman), paid informant for Soviet NKVD
- Frederick Vanderbilt Field, scion of wealthy family, president of The Harvard Crimson, defended the Great Purge stating "... because Comrade Stalin says so, we have to believe the trials are just. He has never let us down."
- Isaac Folkoff, senior founding member of the California Communist Party and West Coast liaison between Soviet intelligence and the Communist Party USA (CPUSA)
- Grigory Kheifets, San Francisco NKVD station chief or Rezident
- George Koval, Iowa-born agent received the Hero of Russia award from President Putin for Manhattan Project infiltration that "drastically reduced the amount of time it took for Russia to develop nuclear weapons"; died in Moscow
- Samuel Krafsur, TASS reporter who was mentioned prominently in the Venona files
- Walter Krivitsky, close friend of Ignace Reiss; defected to U.S. to escape Great Purge, associate of Chambers, shot dead in D.C.
- Rudy Lambert, head of California Communist Party, figured prominently in AEC revocation of Oppenheimer's security clearance
- Maxim Lieber, prominent NYC agent named by Chambers; pled the Fifth, fled to Mexico, Poland
- Ludwig Lore, socialist journalist for New Yorker Volkszeitung and the New York Post; recruited agents and gave info to Soviets
- Donald Maclean, joined Soviet NKVD at Cambridge, diplomat for UK in D.C., main source of info about U.S. energy policy that helped USSR evaluate nuclear arsenal, died in Moscow
- Alan Nunn May, UK physicist, contemporary of Maclean at Cambridge; confessed to giving Manhattan Project secrets to USSR which led to McMahon Act restricting sharing with UK; served 6½ of 10-year hard-labor sentence
- Isaiah Oggins, friend of Whittaker Chambers at Columbia; NKVD agent then accused of "treason" by Soviets and summarily executed by Stalin
- Alexander Orlov, NKVD rezident in Republican government during Spanish Civil War, defected to U.S. to escape Stalin's Great Purge
- Kim Philby, OBE, recruited by USSR at Cambridge, UK intelligence rep in D.C. where he covered for Guy Burgess at UK embassy; won Order of Lenin, died in Moscow
- Juliet Poyntz, taught at Columbia, co-founded Communist Party USA, visited Moscow during Stalin's Great Purge, returned disillusioned, disappeared in NYC
- Vladimir Pravdin, a.k.a. Roland Lyudvigovich Abbiate, UK-born senior NKVD assassin during Great Purge, killed defector Ignace Reiss; stationed in U.S. as head of TASS news agency; contacts included Judith Coplon and Joseph Katz
- Fred Rose (politician), Canadian Member of Parliament, led Soviet spies targeting Manhattan Project exposed by Igor Gouzenko's defection; died in Poland
- David A. Salmon, operative in State Dept. and War Dept.
- Marion Schultz, asset of the New York NKVD working within immigrant community during World War II
- Pavel Sudoplatov, top Soviet spy who accused Oppenheimer
- William Weisband, U.S. Army signals intelligence staffer and NKVD agent handler

==== KGB ====
- Aldrich Ames, CIA officer, started spying for USSR as walk-in to old Soviet embassy in D.C., sentenced to life
- Felix Bloch, U.S. State Dept. economic officer; Soviets were warned about U.S. investigation into his activities by Robert Hanssen
- David Sheldon Boone, signals Intelligence analyst at NSA, sentenced to 24 years for selling info to USSR
- Christopher John Boyce, one of 2 walk-in spies for USSR known as the Falcon and the Snowman, sentenced to 40 years before escape, then 28 more
- James Hall III, served 22 of 40-year sentence for espionage committed at NSA station in Germany
- Robert P. Hanssen, FBI agent given 15 consecutive life sentences; betrayed existence of tunnel under Soviet embassy in D.C.; may have done most damage since Kim Philby of Cambridge Five
- Reino Häyhänen, Finn who spied in U.S. handled by Rudolf Abel, used the VIC cipher, defected to U.S.
- Clarence Hiskey, CPUSA member whose association with J. Robert Oppenheimer contributed to loss of security clearance
- Edward Lee Howard, ex-CIA officer who sold info, subtitled book The Only CIA Operative To Seek Asylum In Russia
- Daulton Lee, one of 2 walk-in spies for USSR known as the Falcon and the Snowman, sentenced to life
- Clayton J. Lonetree, U.S. Marine, Moscow embassy guard suborned by female KGB agent; sentenced to life
- James Walter Miller, one of Isaac Folkoff's most valuable assets at San Francisco KGB as government censor
- Harold James Nicholson, former CIA officer twice convicted of espionage, sentenced to total of 33½ years in Florence supermax prison
- Ronald Pelton, NSA analyst, walk-in to old Soviet embassy in D.C., sentenced to 3 concurrent life terms
- Earl Edwin Pitts, former FBI special agent arrested at FBI Academy in Quantico, Va., sentenced to 27 years
- Norman J. Rees, oil engineer, Soviet agent, then double agent for FBI; committed suicide after exposure by newspaper
- George Trofimoff, most senior U.S. military officer ever charged with espionage, sentenced to life
- Arthur Walker, brother of John Walker, sentenced to 3 life terms + 40 years
- John Anthony Walker, U.S. Navy senior enlisted man, spied for USSR for decades, recruited family and friends, sentenced to 3 life terms
- Michael Walker, son of John Walker, sentenced to life
- Joseph Weinberg, KGB contact for Byron Darling; student of J. Robert Oppenheimer at Berkeley
- Jerry Whitworth, sentenced to 365 years for role in Walker spy ring, said to be "most damaging espionage ring uncovered in the U.S. in 3 decades."

==== Buben group ====
- Louis F. Budenz, Central Committee of Communist Party USA, editor of Daily Worker, professor at Fordham, then renounced communism
- Robert Menaker, operative whose father was imprisoned as a Russian revolutionary and whose niece married Victor Perlo
- Salmond Franklin, a communications "signaler" (sviazist), married Sylvia Callen, worked with Morris Cohen and Milton Wolff
- Sylvia Caldwell, technical secretary for a Trotskyist group in NYC
- Lona Cohen, served 8 of 20-year sentence; died in Moscow; subject of Hugh Whitemore's drama for stage and TV Pack of Lies
- Morris Cohen, served 8 of 25-year sentence; died in Moscow; subject of Hugh Whitemore's drama for stage and TV Pack of Lies
- Judith Coplon, NKGB counter-intelligence operative in U.S. Justice Dept.; two convictions overturned on Constitutional technicalities
- Eugene Dennis, senior member of Communist Party USA leadership, sentenced to 5 years for advocating overthrow of U.S. government
- Dieter Gerhardt, South African Navy commodore who was convicted of spying for USSR; alleged that Vela incident was a joint Israeli–South African nuclear test
- Theodore Hall, physicist who supplied high-level info from Los Alamos during Manhattan Project, a NYC walk-in, never prosecuted, fled to Cambridge, UK where he admitted guilt in media interviews
- Clarence Hiskey, CPUSA member whose association with J. Robert Oppenheimer led to loss of security clearance

==== Mocase ====
- Boris Morros, Hollywood producer
- Jack Soble, sentenced to 7 years, brother of Robert Soblen
- Myra Soble, sentenced to 5½ years
- Robert Soblen, sentenced to life for spying at Sandia Lab, etc., but escaped to Israel, then committed suicide
- Jane Foster Zlatovski, allegedly became member (with husband) of a Soviet espionage ring run by Jack Soble
- Mark Zborowski, NKVD's most valuable mole inside the Trotskyist organization in Paris and NYC; served 47-month sentence for perjury

==== Perlo group ====
- Victor Perlo, joined Communist Party USA at Columbia, then joined series of gov't agencies including U.S. Treasury Dept.; Brookings Institution
- Harold Glasser, Director, Division of Monetary Research, U.S. Treasury Dept.; United Nations Relief and Rehabilitation Administration (UNRRA); War Production Board; Adviser on North African Affairs Committee; U.S. Treasury Representative to the Allied High Commission in Italy
- Alger Hiss, Director of the Office of Special Political Affairs, U.S. State Dept., served 3½ years for perjury
- Charles Kramer, Senate Subcommittee on War Mobilization; Office of Price Administration; National Labor Relations Board; Senate Subcommittee on Wartime Health and Education; Agricultural Adjustment Administration; Senate Subcommittee on Civil Liberties; Senate Labor and Public Welfare Committee; Democratic National Committee (DNC)
- Harry Magdoff, Statistical Division of War Production Board and Office of Emergency Management; Bureau of Research and Statistics, Works Progress Administration; Tools Division, War Production Board; Bureau of Foreign and Domestic Commerce, U.S. Commerce Dept.
- Allen Rosenberg, Board of Economic Warfare; Chief of the Economic Institution Staff, Foreign Economic Administration; Senate Subcommittee on Civil Liberties; Senate Committee on Education and Labor; Railroad Retirement Board; Counsel to the Secretary of the NLRB

==== Redhead group ====
- Hedwiga Gompertz, Wacek's wife, sent to U.S. to carry out fieldwork assignments, defected in 1948
- Paul Massing, scientist at the Institute for Social Research (the "Frankfurt School") at Columbia University
- Laurence Duggan, former employee of U.S. State Dept., suicide
- Rudolf Roessler chief of Lucy spy ring of World War II

==== Rosenberg ring ====
- Joel Barr, met Julius Rosenberg at City College of New York (CCNY), later spied with him and Al Sarant at Army Signal Corps lab in New Jersey; escaped prosecution by fleeing to Soviet bloc
- Abraham Brothman, served 2 years for conspiring to obstruct justice along with Miriam Moskowitz; Brothman gave secret info to Elizabeth Bentley who turned it over to USSR
- Klaus Fuchs, physicist who supplied info on UK and U.S. atomic bomb research to USSR; served 9 of 14-year sentence in UK; died in East Germany
- Vivian Glassman, fiancée of Joel Barr
- Harry Gold, courier sentenced to 30 years
- David Greenglass, draftsman at Los Alamos in World War II, gave atomic bomb documents to his sister Ethel Rosenberg; sentenced to 15 years
- Ruth Greenglass, escaped prosecution in exchange for her husband's testimony against his sister and brother-in-law, the Rosenbergs
- Miriam Moskowitz, convicted of obstruction of justice for helping Harry Gold; served 2 years in prison, convicted on testimony of Harry Gold and Elizabeth Bentley
- William Perl, active in Young Communist League at CCNY, then met Al Sarant at Columbia; served 5 years for perjury
- Morton Sobell, involved with Barr, Perl and Julius Rosenberg at CCNY; sentenced to 30 years at Alcatraz
- Ethel Rosenberg, executed at Sing Sing prison for conspiracy to commit espionage
- Julius Rosenberg, executed at Sing Sing prison for conspiracy to commit espionage
- Al Sarant, stole radar secrets at Army Signal Corps lab in New Jersey, then he and his mistress abandoned their families for Soviet bloc
- Andrew Roth, ONI liaison officer with U.S. State Dept.
- Saville Sax, friend of Theodore Hall at Harvard, assisted with Hall's giveaway of atomic bomb secrets from Los Alamos to Soviet mission in NYC

==== Silvermaster group ====
- Nathan Gregory Silvermaster, Chief Planning Technician, Procurement Division, U.S. Treasury Dept.; Chief Economist, War Assets Administration; Director of the Labor Division, Farm Security Administration; Board of Economic Warfare; Reconstruction Finance Corporation, U.S. Commerce Dept.
- Helen Silvermaster (wife)
- Solomon Adler, U.S. Treasury Dept. official with Harry Dexter White; returned to his native UK to teach at Cambridge; joined the International Department of the Chinese Communist Party; died in China
- Norman Chandler Bursler, Justice Dept. Antitrust Division
- Frank Coe, associate of Harry Dexter White and Solomon Adler, named by Whittaker Chambers and Elizabeth Bentley as a source of information for Silvermaster and Ware Group; Coe took the Fifth many times; later joined Mao's government for the Great Leap Forward, died in red China
- Lauchlin Currie, Administrative Assistant to FDR; Deputy Administrator of Foreign Economic Administration; Special Representative to China
- Bela Gold, Assistant Head of Program Surveys, Bureau of Agricultural Economics, USDA; Senate Subcommittee on War Mobilization; Office of Economic Programs in Foreign Economic Administration
- Sonia Steinman Gold, Division of Monetary Research, U.S. Treasury Dept.; U.S. House of Representatives Select Committee on Interstate Migration; U.S. Bureau of Employment Security
- Irving Kaplan, Foreign Funds Control and Division of Monetary Research, U.S. Treasury Dept., Foreign Economic Administration; chief adviser to the Occupation Government in Germany
- George Silverman, civilian Chief Production Specialist, Material Division, U.S. Army Air Forces Air Staff, Department of War, Pentagon
- William Henry Taylor, Assistant Director of the Middle East Division of Monetary Research, U.S. Treasury Dept.
- William Ullman, delegate to United Nations Charter meeting and Bretton Woods conference; Division of Monetary Research, U.S. Treasury Dept.; Material and Services Division, Air Corps Headquarters, Pentagon
- Anatole Volkov, courier for the Silvermaster group
- Harry Dexter White, U.S. Treasury official, collaborated with Solomon Adler, Frank Coe and Harold Glasser on failed loan program for Nationalist government of China; head of IMF which he helped create along with UN and World Bank

==== Sound and Myrna groups ====
- Solomon Adler, U.S. Treasury Dept. official with Harry Dexter White; returned to his native UK to teach at Cambridge; joined the International Department of the Chinese Communist Party; died in China
- Cedric Belfrage, journalist; referenced as a Soviet agent in Venona project, although he may have been working as a double-agent for British Security Coordination
- Elizabeth Bentley courier messenger for Communist spy rings on the East Coast, testified about her activities in hearings
- Frank Coe, Assistant Director, Division of Monetary Research, U.S. Treasury Dept.; Special Assistant to the U.S. Ambassador in London; Assistant to the Executive Director, Board of Economic Warfare; Assistant Administrator, Foreign Economic Administration
- Lauchlin Currie, Administrative Assistant to President Roosevelt; Deputy Administrator of Foreign Economic Administration; Special Representative to China
- Rae Elson, courier of Communist Party USA underground, was chosen by Joseph Katz to replace Elizabeth Bentley at the Soviet front organization, U.S. Shipping & Service Corp.
- Edward Fitzgerald, War Production Board
- Charles Flato, Board of Economic Warfare; Civil Liberties Subcommittee, Senate Committee on Education and Labor
- Bela Gold, Bureau of Intelligence, Assistant Head of Program Surveys, Bureau of Agricultural Economics, USDA; Senate Subcommittee on War Mobilization; Office of Economic Programs in Foreign Economic Administration
- Sonia Steinman Gold, Division of Monetary Research, U.S. Treasury Dept.; U.S. House of Representatives Select Committee on Interstate Migration; U.S. Bureau of Employment Security
- Irving Goldman, Office of the Coordinator of Inter-American Affairs
- Jacob Golos, "main pillar" of the NKVD intelligence network in U.S., died in the arms of Elizabeth Bentley
- Gerald Graze, United States Civil Service Commission; Dept. of Defense, U.S. Navy official
- Maurice Halperin, Chief of Latin American Division, Research and Analysis section, OSS; U.S. State Dept.
- Julius Joseph, Far Eastern section (Japanese Intelligence) OSS
- Irving Kaplan, U.S. Treasury Dept. Foreign Economic Administration; UN Division of Economic Stability and Development; Chief Adviser to the Military Government of Germany
- Joseph Katz, part of NKGB mission recruiting members of Communist Party USA.
- Duncan Lee, counsel to General William Donovan, head of OSS
- Helen Lowry, Soviet citizen born and raised in U.S., niece of Earl Browder; wife of Iskhak Akhmerov
- Harry Magdoff, Chief of the Control Records Section of War Production Board and Office of Emergency Management; Bureau of Research and Statistics, Works Progress Administration; Tools Division, War Production Board; Bureau of Foreign and Domestic Commerce, U.S. Commerce Dept.; Statistics Division WPA
- Jenny Levy Miller, Chinese Government Purchasing Commission
- Robert Miller, Office of the Coordinator of Inter-American Affairs; Near Eastern Division, State Dept.
- Willard Park, Assistant Chief of the Economic Analysis Section, Office of the Coordinator of Inter-American Affairs; United Nations Relief and Rehabilitation Administration
- Victor Perlo, chief of the Aviation Section of the War Production Board; head of branch in Research Section, Office of Price Administration, Dept. of Commerce; Division of Monetary Research, U.S. Treasury Dept.; Brookings Institution, head of Perlo group
- Mary Price, stenographer for Walter Lippmann of the New York Herald
- William Remington, War Production Board; Office of Emergency Management, convicted for perjury, killed in prison
- Ruth Rivkin, United Nations Relief and Rehabilitation Administration, a source for Golos-Bentley network of spies
- Allan Rosenberg, Board of Economic Warfare; Chief of the Economic Institution Staff, Foreign Economic Administration; Civil Liberties Subcommittee, Senate Committee on Education and Labor; Railroad Retirement Board; Counsel to the Secretary of the NLRB
- Bernard Schuster
- Greg Silvermaster, Chief Planning Technician, Procurement Division, U.S. Treasury Dept.; Chief Economist, War Assets Administration; Director of the Labor Division, Farm Security Administration; Board of Economic Warfare; Reconstruction Finance Corporation, U.S. Commerce Dept.
- John Spivak, journalist, exposé in the New Masses charged McCormack-Dickstein Committee with suppressing evidence in Business Plot hearings
- William Taylor, Assistant Director of Monetary Research, U.S. Treasury Dept.
- Helen Tenney, OSS
- Lud Ullman, delegate to United Nations Charter meeting and Bretton Woods conference; Division of Monetary Research, U.S. Treasury Dept.; Material and Services Division, U.S. Army Air Corps Headquarters, Pentagon
- David Weintraub, U.S. State Dept.; head of the Office of Foreign Relief and Rehabilitation Operations; United Nations Relief and Rehabilitation Administration (UNRRA); United Nations Division of Economic Stability and Development
- Donald Wheeler, OSS Research and Analysis division
- Anatoly Gorsky, (Anatoly Veniaminovich Gorsky, A. V. Gorsky), "Vadim", former rezident of the MGB USSR in Washington
- Olga Pravdina, former employee of the Ministry of Trade, wife of "Sergei," the rezident in New York; author of Gorsky Memo (see Vladimir Pravdin)
- Vladimir Pravdin, "Sergei", TASS, former rezident of the MGB USSR in New York
- Mikhail A. Shaliapin [Shalyapin], "Stock" ["Shtok"]
- Gaik Badelovich Ovakimian, former rezident of the MGB USSR in New York
- Iskhak Abdulovich Akhmerov, "Albert" – former Illegal Rezident of the MGB USSR in New York
- Michael Straight, speechwriter for FDR

==== Ware group ====
- Whittaker Chambers, U.S. State Dept., testified against Alger Hiss
- Henry Collins, NRA; USDA
- John Herrmann, Communist Party USA operative and courier, eventually drank himself to death in Jalisco, Mexico
- Alger Hiss, U.S. State Dept., sentenced to 5 years for perjury
- Donald Hiss, U.S. State Dept., younger brother of Alger Hiss
- Victor Perlo, became spymaster of Perlo group during World War II
- George Silverman, Harvard-educated statistician who gave secret Pentagon documents to Nathan Silvermaster group during World War II
- Harry Dexter White, Assistant Secretary of the Treasury, head of the IMF which he helped establish along with the World Bank; highest placed Soviet asset in U.S. government
- Bill Weisband, U.S. Army Signals Security Agency
- Nathaniel Weyl, joined Communist Party USA with Perlo at Columbia, confessed to espionage in Senate hearings
- Enos Wicher, professor at Columbia University who also worked at Columbia's Division of War Research; stepfather of Columbia recruiter and State Department spy Flora Wovschin

==== The "Berg" – "Art" Group ====
- Alexander Koral, former engineer of municipality of NYC
- Helen Koral, Koral's wife, housewife
- Byron T. Darling, engineer for Rubber Co.
- A. A. Yatskov, General Consul of the Consulate-General of the USSR's delegation in NYC in 1940s
- George Blake, UK SIS officer who betrayed existence of Berlin Tunnel under Soviet sector and who probably betrayed Popov

==== KGB Illegals ====
- Rudolf Abel, a.k.a. William Fischer, Illegal Rezident in the 1950s
- Iskhak Akhmerov, MGB, OGPU/NKVD in NYC; recruited agents in U.S. State Dept., U.S. Treasury, and U.S. intelligence services; chief illegal rezident in U.S.; agents he ran include Laurence Duggan, Mary Price, and Michael Straight; husband of Helen Lowry
- Boris Bazarov, OGPU (Soviet secret police) official who served as the chief Illegal Rezident in NYC; group included Iskhak Akhmerov and Helen Lowry; shot after Great Purge

=== GRU (Soviet military intelligence) ===
==== Karl group ====
- Noel Field, entered State Dept. from Harvard, associate of Paul Massing, exposed by Whittaker Chambers testimony, arrested and tortured 5 years on Soviet orders, died in Hungary
- Harold Glasser, Director, Division of Monetary Research, U.S. Treasury Dept.; United Nations Relief and Rehabilitation Administration; War Production Board; Adviser on North African Affairs Committee; U.S. Treasury Representative to the Allied High Commission in Italy
- Alger Hiss, U.S. State Dept.; sentenced to 5 years for perjury
- Donald Hiss, State Dept.; Labor Dept.; Interior Dept., convicted of perjury
- Victor Perlo, chief of the Aviation Section of the War Production Board; head of branch in Research Section, Office of Price Administration, Commerce Dept.; Division of Monetary Research, U.S. Treasury Dept.; Brookings Institution, head of Perlo group
- J. Peters, a.k.a. Sándor Goldberger, leading figure of the Hungarian language section of the Communist Party USA in the 1920s and 1930s.
- William Ward Pigman, National Bureau of Standards; Labor and Public Welfare Committee
- Vincent Reno, mathematician at U.S. Army's Aberdeen Proving Ground
- George Silverman, Director of the Bureau of Research and Information Services, U.S. Railroad Retirement Board; Economic Adviser and Chief of Analysis and Plans, Assistant Chief of Air Staff, Material and Services, War Dept.
- Julian Wadleigh, U.S. State Dept., passed documents to Soviets via Whittaker Chambers in D.C.
- Harry Dexter White, Assistant Secretary of the Treasury with Solomon Adler and Frank Coe, head of IMF; considered highest USSR agent in U.S. gov't
- Viktor Vasilevish Sveshchnikov, U.S. War Dept.

==== Portland ring ====
- Morris Cohen (Soviet spy) served 8 of 25-year sentence, then exchanged; subject of Hugh Whitemore's drama for stage and TV Pack of Lies; died in Moscow
- Lona Cohen, served 8 of 20-year sentence, then exchanged; subject of Hugh Whitemore's drama for stage and TV Pack of Lies; died in Moscow
- Ethel Gee, Houghton's accomplice, served 9 of 15-year sentence
- Harry Houghton, passed British naval testing secrets from Isle of Portland, UK; served 9 of 15-year sentence
- Konon Molody (a.k.a. Gordon Lonsdale), served 3 of 25-year sentence, then exchanged for a prisoner from USSR

==== Sorge ring ====
- Chen Han-seng, spied for Moscow, mistreated in native China during Cultural Revolution
- Hotsumi Ozaki, journalist, only Japanese person hanged for treason during WW2
- Agnes Smedley, journalist, friend of Richard Sorge
- Lydia Stahl, photographer, sentenced to 4 years in France
- Joseph Benjamin Stenbuck, leading Manhattan surgeon, accused of being a dead drop
- Irving Charles Velson, Brooklyn Navy Yard; American Labor Party candidate for New York State Senate
- Flora Wovschin, NKVD operative in U.S. State Dept., stepdaughter of Enos Wicher, friend of Marion Davis Berdecio and Judith Coplon from Columbia
- Vasily Zarubin, husband of Elizabeth Zubilin
- Elizabeth Zubilin, recruiter in U.S. of whom Pavel Sudoplatov, head of NKVD Fourth Directorate said, "In developing J. Robert Oppenheimer as a source, Elizabeth Zubilin was essential."

==== Naval GRU ====
- Jack Fahy, Naval GRU, Office of the Coordinator of Inter-American Affairs; Board of Economic Warfare; U.S. Interior Dept., targeted by Dies Committee
- Edna Patterson, Naval GRU, Soviet citizen born in Australia, operated in U.S. 13 years

==== GRU Illegals ====
- Moishe Stern, gained fame under his nom de guerre as General Kléber of International Brigade during Spanish Civil War.
- Alfred Tilton, Latvian head of GRU in U.S., arrested by Soviets during Great Purge, sentenced to 15 years, died in Gulag
- Alexander Ulanovsky, a.k.a. Bill Berman, Felik, Long Man, Nathan Sherman, chief Illegal rezident for GRU in U.S., then prisoner in Soviet Gulag with his family
- Ignacy Witczak, GRU Illegal officer in U.S. during World War II

==== Others ====
- Arthur Adams, Swedish-born Hero of Russia, gave Manhattan Project information to the USSR, died in Moscow.
- Arvid Jacobson, Detroit teacher vetted by Whittaker Chambers, sentenced to 6 years in Finland, returned to the United States.
- George Koval, previously unknown Soviet agent whose infiltration of the Manhattan Project "drastically reduced the amount of time it took for Russia to develop nuclear weapons"; posthumously honored by Russian President Vladimir Putin.
- Irving Lerner, GRU agent handled by Arthur Adams, caught spying at the University of California, Berkeley.
- Alexander Orlov, a.k.a. Leiba Lazarevich Feldbin, NKVD rezident in the Republican government during the Spanish Civil War, defected to the United States.
- Milton Schwartz, American who spied for Soviet military intelligence (GRU).

== See also ==
- Active measures
- Atomic spies
- List of cryptographers
- List of Americans in the Venona papers
- List of fictional secret agents
- Nuclear espionage
- Soviet espionage in the United States
- Treason
