= Frank Coe (government official) =

United States government official and Soviet spy

Virginius Frank Coe
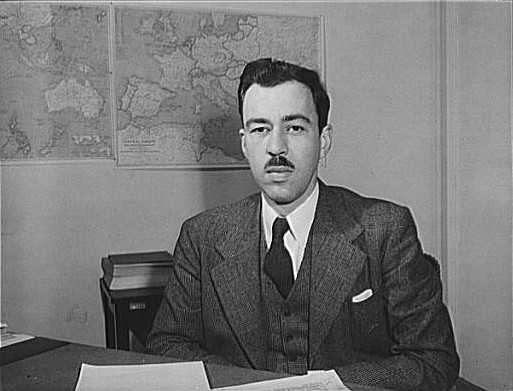
- Born: 1907; Richmond, Virginia, United States
- Died: June 2, 1980 (aged 73); Beijing, China
- Education: University of Chicago; Johns Hopkins University

Virginius Frank Coe (1907 – June 2, 1980) was a United States government official who was identified by Soviet defectors Elizabeth Bentley and Whittaker Chambers as being an underground member of the Communist Party and as belonging to the Soviet spy group known as the Silvermaster ring.

== Background ==
Born in 1907 in Richmond, Virginia, he attended public schools in Tennessee, Alabama, and Chicago. He attended the University of Chicago, earning his bachelor of philosophy in 1926 and continuing graduate work into 1928. Coe was Jewish.

== Career ==
From 1928 to 1930, he was a member of the staff of the Johns Hopkins University Institute of Law, returning to the University of Chicago as a research assistant and to write his thesis from 1930 to 1933. From 1933 to 1934, he was a member of the staff of the Brookings Institution.

=== Government service ===
In the summer of 1934, he was a consultant in the Office of the Secretary of the Treasury Department; in the summer of 1936 and spring-summer 1939, he was again a consultant at the Treasury. From the autumn of 1934 until the spring of 1939, he taught economics at the University of Toronto, remaining a member of its staff on leave for several years thereafter (in his testimony, Coe says "4, 5, or 6 years"). Beginning in 1939, he worked adviser to Paul McNutt, then head of the Federal Security Agency, and in 1940 as assistant to Leon Henderson in the Office of Price Administration (then known as the National Defense Council).

Late in 1940, he returned to the Treasury Department as an assistant director of monetary research, where he stayed for about a year, during which he was special assistant to the United States Ambassador in England. In 1942, he became Executive Secretary of the Joint War Production Committee of the United States and Canada and an assistant to the Executive Director of the Board of Economic Warfare (later renamed the Foreign Economic Administration). In late 1944/early 1945, Coe was named Director of the Division of Monetary Research in the Treasury Department, serving as technical secretary at the United Nations Monetary and Financial Conference at Bretton Woods, New Hampshire in 1944, he accepted a position as Secretary of the International Monetary Fund in 1946, his successor at Treasury being Harold Glasser.

Coe resigned from the Fund in December 1952 after public calls were made by Congress for his ouster. The IMF announced his resignation on December 3, 1952.

=== Allegations and evidence of espionage ===
The evidence against Coe stems from his being named by two defected spies and ex post examinations of his career.

In 1939, former Communist underground courier Whittaker Chambers named Coe to then-Assistant Secretary of State Adolf Berle as a communist sympathizer who was providing information to the Ware group.

In 1948, former NKVD courier Elizabeth Bentley, testifying before the House Un-American Activities Committee, mentioned Coe, whom she remembered as one of several important Treasury officials who passed on information to Silvermaster.

Called before the HUAC (chaired by Congressman Karl Mundt), Coe denied under oath having ever been a member of the Communist Party USA. Subsequently, he was questioned intensely in the IMF about his activities, but he was not sanctioned or removed from his duties. In late 1952, he was called before a Grand Jury in New York (presided over by Senator Herbert O'Conor) and then before the McCarran Committee on December 1, 1952, both of which were investigating alleged Communist affiliations of U.S. citizens working for the United Nations and other international organizations. On the latter occasion, he declined to answer the question of whether he was a member of the Communist Party on Fifth Amendment grounds, citing the example of Alger Hiss's conviction for perjury.

His final appearance before McCarthy's Permanent Subcommittee on Investigations (PSI) came on June 5 and 8, 1953, chaired by then Senator Karl Mundt.

Nominally, the investigation was into interference with negotiations to devalue the Austrian schilling in November 1949 as the Soviets had apparently been profiting from the black market. U.S. officials with the European Cooperation Administration (the Marshall Plan aid agency) reported that a command came via a tickertape telecon to break off negotiations at the last minute. The telecon, which was with an anonymous person at the State Department, cited Coe in his capacity as Secretary of the IMF as the source of the order. (In truth, the devaluation had been discussed by and was supported by the Executive Board of the IMF.)

The PSI ascertained that Coe could not have been the source of the communication as he was in the Middle East at the time, and quickly turned to investigating Coe's alleged Communist activities. Coe, who consulted constantly with his lawyer Milton S. Friedman, maintained his Fifth-Amendment plea, stating at one point that he did not want to see the blacklist extended to include those who had helped him in his search for work.

The subsequent report of the Senate Sub-Committee on Internal Security stated: "Coe refused to answer, on the grounds that the answers might incriminate him, all questions as to whether he was a Communist, whether he was engaged in subversive activities, or whether he was presently a member of a Soviet espionage ring. He refused for the same reason to answer whether he was a member of an espionage ring while Technical Secretary of the Bretton Woods Conference, whether he ever had had access to confidential Government information or security information, whether he had been associated with the Institute of Pacific Relations, or with individuals named on a long list of people associated with that organization.

=== Later career ===
Coe was Blacklisted, the US denied his passport (in late 1949) and prevented Coe from traveling to neighboring countries (June 1953) due to his ties to Soviet espionage. Coe sought work abroad. He moved to China, where he was among a group of expatriates working with the government. Like most Americans working in China in the 1950s and 1960s, Coe worked as an English language expert. Along with Solomon Adler, Sidney Rittenberg, and Israel Epstein, Coe was a translator for the fourth volume of the Selected Works of Mao Zedong.

Coe did work in the International Liaison Department of the Chinese Communist Party. Coe's value to his superiors was evidently substantial given that Kang Sheng shielded Coe from being purged during the Cultural Revolution, even allowing him to stay in his residence to protect him from the Red Guards. Coe was one of the only people, both Chinese or Foreign, who was ever protected in such a manner by Kang. In 1962, he was joined by Solomon Adler in the circle. Coe participated in Mao's Great Leap Forward, a plan for the rapid industrialization and modernization of China. Coe sought works included articles justifying the Rectification campaign.

== Personal life and death ==
Coe married Ruth Coe, who lived with him in China.

Frank Coe died age 73 on June 2, 1980, in Beijing, China. The New China News Agency listed the cause of his death as a pulmonary embolism and indicated that government officials visited him often during his illness. His brother indicated that he had undergone surgery for cancer eight months earlier.

== Legacy ==
Regarding his policy actions, it is often mentioned that Coe, together with Assistant Treasury Secretary Harry Dexter White and Treasury economist Solomon Adler, opposed President Franklin Roosevelt's gold loan program of $200 million to help the Nationalist Chinese Government stabilize its currency in 1943. However, White's documents indicate while he favored giving economic assistance, he had concerns that cash assistance might be misused or fall into enemy hands.

Arlington Hall cryptographers identified the Soviet agent designated "Peak" in the Venona project as "possibly" Coe, but there is no clear reason for the identification. (One secondary source suggests it was because there was no additional information on Peak.) The decrypt in question reports that five reels of Peak's documents concerning U.S.-British Lend-Lease negotiations were en route to Moscow.

A 1999 investigation into the KGB archives claims that files show Coe to have been a Soviet agent. However, the authors do not quote or reproduce the documents in question and at least one scholar argues that their testimony should be suspended until the primary sources become available.

== Bibliography ==
- Byron, John (1992). The Claws of the Dragon: Kang Sheng (First U.S. ed.). New York: Simon & Schuster. ISBN 0671797166.
