= William Henry Taylor =

William Henry Taylor (30 March 1906 – January 1965) was a Canadian-born U.S. Treasury economist accused by Elizabeth Bentley of having been a Soviet spy.

== Life ==
Taylor, born in British Columbia, studied at the University of British Columbia and later attended school with Nathan Gregory Silvermaster at the University of California, Berkeley, where he received a Ph.D. in 1933. He taught economics at the University of Hawaii for eight years and became a naturalized citizen of the United States in 1940. In 1934, while living in Hawaii, Taylor visited the Soviet Union and spent several months there.

Taylor secured employment within the United States Department of the Treasury through Secretary Harry Dexter White in 1941. The Treasury Department sent him to China and later Lisbon for the Foreign Economic Administration. Taylor also was a member of the Communist Party of the United States (CPUSA), in violation of federal employment statutes barring membership in an organization seeking the violent overthrow of the United States Government. As a CPUSA member and allegedly of the secret apparatus known as the Silvermaster group, Taylor is believed to have supplied information orally and in document form to Soviet intelligence.

In June 1945, Taylor worked out of the U.S. Embassy in London and later that year Paris.

From 1953 to 1955, Byron N. Scott represented him before the International Organization Employees Loyalty Board (IOELB).

Associates claim Taylor spoke about Communism constantly. He is one of two alleged Soviet agents code named "Acorn" as deciphered by the Venona project. Code names sometimes were changed by a user and another assigned.
