= Solomon Adler =

English economist and Soviet spy

Solomon Adler (August 6, 1909 – August 4, 1994) worked as U.S. Treasury representative in China during World War II.

Adler was identified by Whittaker Chambers and Elizabeth Bentley as a Soviet spy and resigned from the Treasury Department in 1950. After several years teaching at Cambridge University in England, he returned to China, where he resided from the 1960s to his death, working as a translator and economic advisor.

From the early 1960s, Adler was also affiliated with the International Department of the Chinese Communist Party whose functions include foreign intelligence.

== Early life ==
Solomon Adler was born on August 6, 1909, in Leeds, England. The Adler family was of Jewish ancestry and originally from Karelitz, Belarus, moving to Leeds in 1900. Solomon Adler was the fifth of ten children; the oldest was Saul Adler, who became a well-known Israeli parasitologist. Adler studied economics at Oxford and University College, London. He moved to the United States in 1935 to do research.

== Career ==
In 1936, he was hired at the Works Progress Administration's National Research Project but soon moved to the Treasury Department's Division of Monetary Research and Statistics, where he worked with Harry Dexter White for the next several years.

Adler became a naturalized US citizen in 1940. In 1941, he was posted to China, where he remained as Treasury representative until 1948. His reports from China to Treasury Secretary Henry Morgenthau Jr., during the war years were widely circulated and played an important role in shaping American wartime economic policy toward China.

In 1949, Adler became the subject of a Loyalty of Government Employees investigation. He resigned before the case was resolved and returned to Britain, where he taught for several years at Cambridge University. When his US passport expired, he was denaturalized and lost his citizenship.

In 1957, Adler wrote a well-received book, The Chinese Economy.

Adler moved to China in the early 1960s. His work in China was not commensurate with his policy expertise. Like most Americans working in China during the 1950s and 1960s, he worked as an English-language expert, including working in the lead group translating the Selected Works of Mao Zedong into English.

A Chinese work published in 1983 stated that from 1963 on Adler worked for China's International Liaison Department, an organ of the Chinese Communist Party whose functions include foreign intelligence. According to historian R. Bruce Craig, Adler's apartment in Beijing was provided by the Liaison Department, indicating that the department was Adler's work unit.

== Later life ==
When the United States re-established diplomatic contacts with China in 1971, Adler renewed his US citizenship. He died in Beijing on August 4, 1994, two days before his 85th birthday.

== Espionage ==
In 1939, Whittaker Chambers identified Adler to then-Assistant Secretary of State Adolf Berle as a member of an underground Communist group in Washington, DC, the Ware group. Chambers correctly identified Adler as serving in the General Counsel's Office at the Treasury Department, from which, Chambers said, Adler supplied weekly reports to the Communist Party of the United States. In 1945, Elizabeth Bentley identified Adler as a member of the Silvermaster group. A 1948 memo written by Anatoly Gorsky, a former NKVD rezident in Washington DC, identified Adler as a Soviet agent designated "Sax." That agent, transliterated "Sachs (Saks)" appears in the Venona decrypts supplying information about the Chinese Communists by both Gorsky and the head of the US Communist Party, Earl Browder.

In addition to his contacts with US espionage groups, while he was serving as Treasury attache in China in 1944, Adler shared a house with Chinese Communist secret agent Chi Ch'ao-ting and State Department officer John Stewart Service, who was arrested the next year in the Amerasia case.

Together with Harry Dexter White, Assistant Secretary of the Treasury, and V. Frank Coe, Director of the Treasury's Division of Monetary Research, Adler strongly opposed a gold loan program of $200 million to help the Chinese Nationalists control the inflation that took hold in unoccupied China during World War II. Between 1943 and 1945, prices rose more than 1,000% per year, weakening the Nationalist government. The inflation helped the Communists eventually come to power in China, and in later years White, Coe, and Adler were accused of having deliberately fostered inflation by obstructing the stabilization loan.

== Sources ==
- Solomon Adler: The Chinese Economy (London, Routledge & Paul 1957)
- Joan Robinson, Sol Adler: China: an economic perspective, foreword by Harold Wilson (London, Fabian International Bureau 1958)
- Sol Adler: A Talk to Comrades of the English Section for the Translation of Volume V of Chairman Mao's Selected Works (Guānyú "Máo xuǎn" dì-wǔ juǎn fānyì wèntí de bàogào 关于《毛选》第五卷翻译问题的报告; Beijing, Foreign Languages Press 1978).
