= Sonia Steinman Gold =

Sonia Steinman Gold (December 17, 1917 in New York City – August 31, 2009) was a United States government employee in the 1930s and 1940s who, along with her husband Bela Gold, is alleged to be part of the Silvermaster spy ring in Washington D.C., spying for the Soviet Union during World War II.

== Biography ==
Prior to World War II she worked for the United States House of Representatives Select Committee on Interstate Migration and in the United States Bureau of Employment Security. Sonia Gold received an appointment after Assistant Secretary of the Treasury Harry Dexter White was asked by the Communist Party USA underground secret apparatus to place her within his office. The appointment within the Treasury Department Division of Monetary Research was to help facilitate the transmission of stolen documents to the Soviet Union. Much of the information dealt with the Treasury Departments's views and recommendations about applications for loans made by the Chinese and French governments. There was also political information regarding Charles de Gaulle, leader of the French National Committee. Her office was one block from the White House. Gold was the wife of Bela Gold. She left the United States Department of the Treasury in late 1944 on maternity leave.

Sonia Gold's code name in Soviet intelligence according to the Venona project was "Zhenya".

== See also ==
- FBI Silvermaster File
