= Anatoly Gorsky =

KGB officer

Anatoly Veniaminovich Gorsky (Russian: Анатолий Вениаминович Горский; c. 1907 – 1980) was a Soviet spy who, undercover as First Secretary "Anatoly Borisovich Gromov" of the Soviet Embassy in Washington, was secretly rezident in the United States at the end of World War II.

== Career ==
Gorsky joined the Soviet secret police in 1928 and worked in the internal political police. In 1936 he transferred to foreign intelligence and was sent to England as cipher clerk and assistant to the London rezident. During the Great Purge of 1939 the London rezidentura was liquidated, and in March 1940 Gorsky was recalled to Moscow. Gorsky survived the purges and was appointed London rezident in November 1940, during the Hitler–Stalin Pact. In London his first cover was attaché, then second secretary of the Soviet embassy.

As London rezident Gorsky took over managing eighteen agents, including the Cambridge Five, and the initial Soviet penetration of the British atomic bomb project. The London rezidentura consisted of only three people. By the end of the war there were twelve operational workers. In the heaviest period of war, from 1941 to 1942 the London rezidentura was the basic information source of Soviet operations on Germany and countries of the anti-Hitler coalition. More than ten thousand documentary items along political, economic, military and other matter were sent from the London rezidentura to Moscow.

In September 1941 the London rezidentura obtained and sent to Moscow documentary materials on work in Great Britain and the US on the creation of nuclear weapons and supplied a constant stream of information. During January 1944 Gorsky returned to Moscow after the completion of this mission and was assigned deputy division head.

== Espionage activities in the United States ==
Following the sudden recall of Vasily Zarubin in 1944, Gorsky was appointed rezident in the United States. The Federal Bureau of Investigation identified him the following year when, at the direction of the Bureau, defecting Soviet courier Elizabeth Bentley met under FBI surveillance with Gorsky, whom she knew as "Al."

When FBI Director J. Edgar Hoover informed Sir William Stephenson, head of British intelligence in the western hemisphere, of Bentley’s defection, the head of British counter-espionage against the Soviet Union—-Soviet agent Kim Philby of the Cambridge spy ring—-promptly alerted Soviet intelligence. Moscow cabled all U.S. station chiefs to “cease immediately their connection with all persons known to Bentley in our work [and] to warn the agents about Bentley’s betrayal.” The cable specifically ordered Gorsky to cease meeting with Harold Glasser, Donald Wheeler, Alan Rosenberg, Charles Kramer, Victor Perlo, Helen Tenney, Maurice Halperin, Lauchlin Currie, and others.

Gorsky sent a long memorandum to Moscow discussing the best way to kill Bentley. He considered shooting, poisoning, faking an accident or faking her suicide, suggesting that the job might be assigned to Joseph Katz. Within two months of the meeting, Gorsky had been recalled to Moscow, along with Iskhak Akhmerov and others.

== Later career ==
In 1948, Gorsky authored the Gorsky memo, an internal Soviet secret police document in which he listed 43 Soviet sources and intelligence officers likely to be identified to American authorities by Bentley after her defection, including Alger Hiss, Harry White and Lauchlin Currie.

In 1953 Gorsky shifted to internal security work. For successful work in the United States Gorsky obtained the rank of Colonel and in 1945 was awarded the Order of the Patriotic War. He also received the Order of the Red Banner, the Order of the Red Banner of Labour, the Order of the Badge of Honour, and the Order of the Red Star.
