= Bela Gold =

American businessman

Bela Gold, also Bill Gold, (1915–2012), was a Hungarian-born American writer, researcher, and college professor.

== Biography ==
Bela Gold was born on 30 January 1915, in Kolozsvár (then in Austria-Hungary, now Cluj-Napoca, in Romania). His parents were Esther (born 1891) and Leo Gold (born 1890), a dry goods salesman. His brother was William Gold (born 1921). In 1920, the family emigrated to the United States.

In the early 1940s, Gold began work at the Senate Subcommittee on War Mobilization, while his wife Sonya worked in government as well, for a time for Harry Dexter White. The Golds were spied upon by J. Edgar Hoover's Federal Bureau of Investigation for a time in the 1940s.

The Golds came to testify at the House Unamerican Activities Committee because of the accusations of Communist Party and Soviet intelligence defector Elizabeth Bentley. The Golds denied working with the Soviets and denied they were members of the Communist Party. John Earl Haynes, Harvey Klehr, and Alexander Vassiliev wrote a book published in 2009 claiming that the Golds were recruited to give information to Soviet agents. Some of their work has been debated by other historians.

After the war, Bill Gold went to the University of Pittsburgh and became a professor. He later became a research director at Case Western Reserve University, and eventually a professor at Claremont Graduate School (now Claremont Graduate University). He also worked on the National Research Council and wrote several books.

== Personal and death ==
In 1938, Gold married Sonia Steinman Gold.

Gold died aged 96 on 14 April 2012.
