= Maurice Halperin =

Writer, professor, diplomat and accused spy

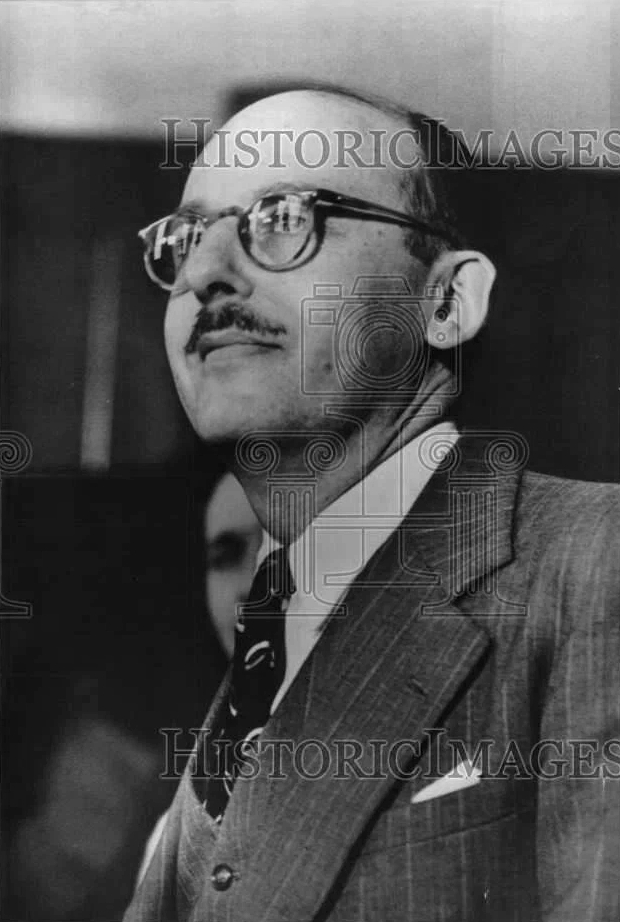
- Halperin in 1953
- Born: Maurice Hyman Halperin; March 3, 1906; Boston, Massachusetts
- Died: February 9, 1995 (aged 88); Royal Columbia Hospital, Vancouver, British Columbia, Canada
- Education: Harvard College; University of Oklahoma; Sorbonne
- Occupations: Scholar, intelligence offer, diplomat
- Employer(s): OSS, State Department, Boston University, Simon Fraser University

Maurice Hyman Halperin (1906–1995) was an American writer, professor, diplomat, and accused Soviet spy (NKVD code name "Hare").

== Early life and education ==
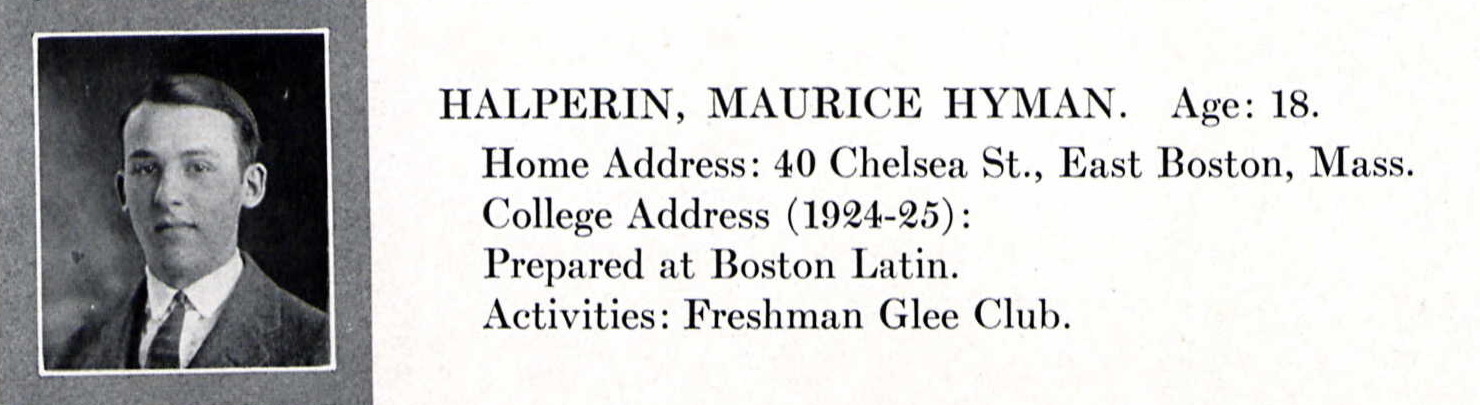
Halperin in the Harvard University yearbook, 1927

Maurice Hyman Halperin was born on March 3, 1906, in Boston, Massachusetts. In 1927, he received an A.B. from Harvard College, in 1939 an MA from the University of Oklahoma, and in 1931 a doctorate from the Sorbonne.

== Career ==
=== Academics ===
In 1930, Halperin lectured at the Sorbonne while studying there.

In 1935, he traveled to Cuba with the League of American Writers to investigate possible human rights abuses. Sometime during this period, he joined the Communist Party of the USA (CPUSA).

Halperin taught at the University of Oklahoma, with summer 1941 as visiting professor at the University of Florida.

=== Government ===
In late summer 1941, Halperin began working for the US federal government as a Latin American specialist. From 1941 to 1945, he served as division chief (Latin America) in the Office of the Coordinator of Information, soon the Research Division of the Office of Strategic Services (OSS), and served as special assistant to Duncan Chapin Lee.

During this period, he may have become an espionage agent and agreed to provide intelligence for the Joseph Stalin-era Soviet intelligence service, the NKVD. Halperin's alleged NKVD codename was "Hare." He became a member of the Golos spy network (operated by the NKVD's chief of American operations Gaik Ovakimian).

With access to the OSS cable room, Halperin could secure copies of secret U.S. reports from any part of the world. Through the Golos spy network, he provided Soviet intelligence with a large quantity of sensitive U.S. diplomatic dispatches, including reports from Ambassador John Gilbert Winant in London on the position of the Polish government-in-exile towards negotiations with Stalin, Turkey's foreign policy toward Romania, the State Department's instructions to the U.S. ambassador to Spain, the U.S. embassy in Morocco's reports on that country's government, reports on the U.S. government's relationship with Vichy and Free French factions and persons in exile, reports of peace feelers from dissident Germans passed to the Vatican, U.S. attitudes towards Josip Broz Tito's Communist Front activities in Yugoslavia, and discussions between the Greek government and the United States regarding Soviet ambitions in the Balkans. Halperin also distorted OSS reports with false information in order to reflect the views of Stalin, the Soviet Union, and the Communist Party of the United States.

After the OSS was dissolved in 1945, Halperin transferred to the State Department and worked as an adviser to United States Secretary of State Dean Acheson, again on Latin American affairs. Halperin was an advisor to the United Nations at the first conference in San Francisco (with Alger Hiss serving as acting secretary general). He helped establish a Hebrew language service for the UN, beamed to Palestine.

In 1946 (or 1949), Halperin resigned from the State Department to take the position of chair of Latin American studies at Boston University.

=== HUAC investigation (1948) ===
On July 31, 1948, ex-Soviet spy Elizabeth Bentley testified under subpoena before the House Un-American Activities Committee and related details which she first shared with the FBI in 1945. In 1945, Bentley, who had inherited the Golos network, defected from the Soviet underground and sought out the Federal Bureau of Investigation. During questioning, Bentley told FBI agents that from 1942 to 1944, Halperin at OSS had delivered "to Mary Price and later to myself mimeographed bulletins and reports prepared by OSS on a variety of topics and also supplied excerpts from State Department cables to which he evidently had access." Bentley added that "some time early in 1945 'JACK', [Soviet agent Joseph Katz] the Russian contact at that time, told me that Halperin had been accused by General William J. Donovan, the head of OSS, of being a Soviet agent..." The next day, the FBI notified Harry S. Truman's White House that "according to a "highly confidential source," among those "employed by the government of the United States" who "have been furnishing data and information to persons outside the Federal government, who are in turn transmitting this information to espionage agents of the Soviet government," was "Maurice Halperin, Office of Strategic Services." Subsequent surveillance of Halperin disclosed that he was in contact with Nathan Gregory Silvermaster, Lauchlin Currie, Philip and Mary Jane Keeney, and others.

=== SISS investigation (1953) ===
In 1953, after Soviet cables were secretly decrypted by U.S. counter-intelligence, Halperin was called before the Senate Internal Security Subcommittee to defend himself on charges of espionage, at which time he lost his teaching position at Boston University. He denied the charges, but nevertheless fled to Mexico and taught at the National University of Mexico. To avoid extradition from Mexico, Halperin moved to the Soviet Union, where he studied and taught. Among the friends he made there were British defector Donald Maclean and Cuban revolutionary leader Che Guevara.

=== Remaining years ===
Disenchanted with communism in the Soviet Union, Halperin accepted Guevara's invitation to come to Havana in 1962. There, he consulted to the Ministry of Trade in the Fidel Castro government for five years and taught at the University of Havana. Political tensions forced him to leave for Vancouver, British Columbia, Canada. In Vancouver, he became a political science professor at Simon Fraser University, and wrote several books critical of Castro's government and the socio-political situation in Cuba.

== Personal life and death ==
Halperin married and had two surviving children.

Maurice Halperin died age 88 on February 9, 1995, of a stroke at the Royal Columbia Hospital just outside Vancouver, Canada.

== Legacy ==
After Halperin's death, the release of the Venona project decryptions of coded Soviet cables, as well as information gleaned from Soviet KGB archives, revealed that he was involved in espionage activities on behalf of the Soviet Union while serving in an official capacity with the United States government.

== Works ==
Aside from an early literary study, Halperin published three books critical of Castro:

- Roman de Tristan et Iseut dans la littérature anglo-américaine au XIXe et au XXe siècles (1931)
- Rise and Decline of Fidel Castro: An Essay in Contemporary History (1972)
- The Taming of Fidel Castro (1981)
- Return to Havana (1994)

== See also ==
- NKVD
- Elizabeth Bentley
- Silvermaster Group
- Perlo Group
- Venona project
