= Julius Joseph =

Julius Joseph may refer to:

- Julius Joseph (spy), American government official
- Julius Joseph (basketball) (born 1975), British basketball player
