= Rae Elson =

This article is part of the
Venona
series.
Secret apparatus
U.S. Service and Shipping Corporation

Rae Elson (also Ray Elson) was a 20th-century American agent in the Soviet underground, who in the early 1940s replaced Elizabeth Bentley as head of the Communist front organization called the "U.S. Service and Shipping Corporation."

== Career ==
Elson was employed in the Civil Rights Committee in New York City in the 1930s and was a very active dues paying member of the Communist Party of the United States (CPUSA). Communist Party dues amounted to ten percent of a member's income.

Elson was active in the CPUSA underground secret apparatus as a courier. Elson seems to have always had direct contacts with Soviet intelligence. By May 1945, Elizabeth Bentley had several messages with Soviet contacts communicated through Elson. When Bentley sought to remove herself from her position as Vice President of the U.S. Service and Shipping Corporation, a CPUSA and Comintern front organization for Soviet espionage activities, Joseph Katz selected Elson to replace Bentley. Earl Browder, General Secretary of the CPUSA, helped Elson acquire interest in the firm by selling his stock to her.

In late November 1945, Elson met with Bentley and they discussed the difficulties both were having meeting with their Russian contacts. Bentley defected within days after this meeting.

== Sources ==
- Vassiliev, Alexander (2003), Alexander Vassiliev's Notes on Anatoly Gorsky's December 1948 Memo on Compromised American Sources and Networks
- FBI Silvermaster file
