= Richard G. Green =

American lawyer

- Born: December 13, 1913
- Died: September 3, 2001 (aged 87)
- Era: 20th-century

Richard G. Green (December 13, 1913 – September 3, 2001) was a 20th-century American lawyer who championed civil rights and free speech, including defense of William Remington in the late 1940s and Stephen Radich in the 1960s.

== Background ==
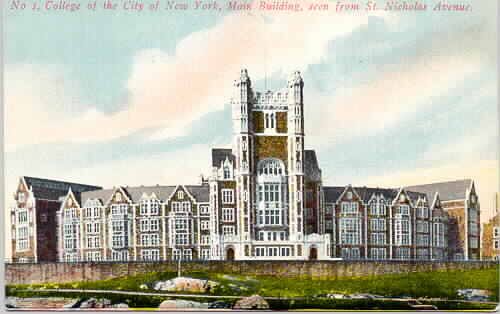
View of original entrance to Shepard Hall, main building of the City College of New York (early 1900s)

Richard G. Green was born December 13, 1913, in New York City. He studied at City College of New York and the Brooklyn Law School.

== Career ==
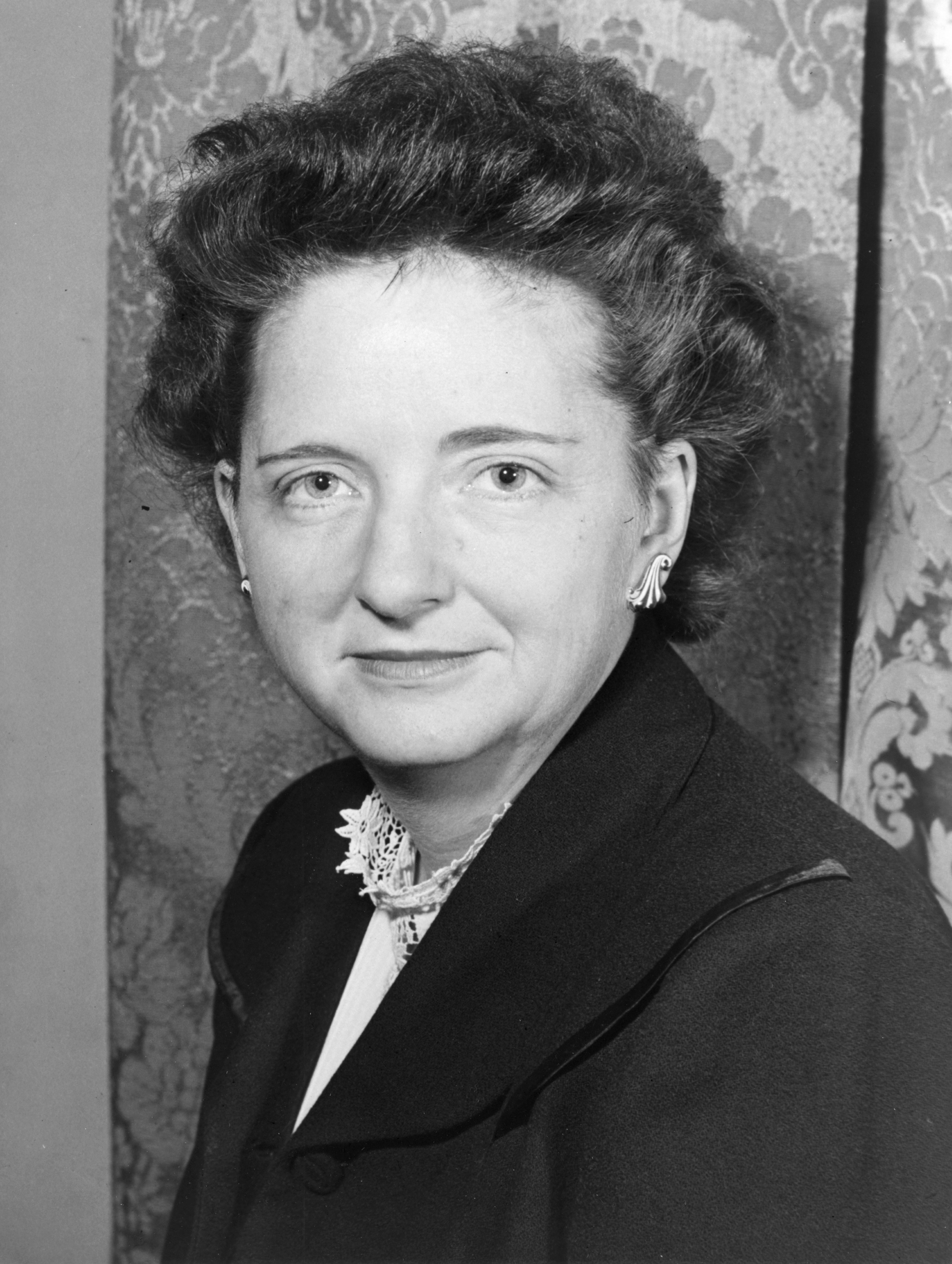
Elizabeth Bentley (1948)

On September 12, 1948 (a Sunday) at 8:30 PM, Elizabeth Bentley appeared again the first-ever television broadcast via WNBT of NBC's Meet the Press and was the first interviewed. Journalists included: Nelson Frank, Inez Robb, Cecil Brown, and Lawrence Spivak. Cecil Brown asked her three times whether she would accuse William Remington of being a communist outside of congressional protection, she finally did so. Joseph L. Rauh Jr. defended him before a Truman Loyalty Review Board. His attorney Richard Green asked on Remington's asked for her to withdraw the allegations by September 30. When she did not, Green filed for Remington a libel suit against Bentley, NBC, and its television sponsor General Foods Corporation on October 6, 1948. Bentley failed to appear in court in October. On December 29, 1948, Green said he had personally served a summons on her (while, on the same day, judges and lawyers agreed to suspend Alger Hiss's libel suit against Whittaker Chambers due to Justice indictments against Hiss on two counts of perjury two weeks before).

Green defended Stephen Radich, owner of the Radich Gallery of New York City, during his trial in 1967 for exhibiting a show in which artist Marc Morrel abused the American flag, first with the flag as hangman's noose, another with the flag draped in chains. In May 1967, Radich was convicted for violating a New York state law against defilement or mutilation of the American flag.

== Personal and death ==
Green married three times, last to Ruth Davis, and had a son and three step-daughters.

Green died age 87 on September 3, 2001, in New York City.
