= Bella Joseph =

Bella Joseph was the wife of Julius Joseph. The couple worked for the United States Government. It is alleged that they also worked for Soviet Intelligence during World War II, Bella in the Office of Strategic Services' Motion Picture Division.

Her alleged cover name in Soviet intelligence, and as deciphered in the Venona project, is "Colleague". Bella is also identified as "Colleague" in Weinstein and Vassiliev's, The Haunted Wood, a book based on Soviet archives.

== Venona ==
Bella Joseph is referenced in the following Venona project decrypts:

- 880 KGB New York to Moscow, 8 June 1943, p.1
- 880 KGB New York to Moscow, 8 June 1943, p.2
