= Irving Kaplan (government official) =

Irving Kaplan was an official of the United States government, accused of involvement in Soviet espionage.

== Career ==
Kaplan worked with David Weintraub in the Works Progress Administration's National Research Project, later moving to the Department of the Treasury, the War Production Board (WPB), and the Foreign Economic Administration.

== Accusations ==
In 1945, former NKVD courier Elizabeth Bentley told investigators of the Federal Bureau of Investigation that Kaplan was "a dues-paying Communist Party member" who had formerly been associated with the Perlo group of Soviet spies, later moving to the Silvermaster group. She said she learned from Nathan Gregory Silvermaster that Kaplan was a source of Information in the War Production Board.

The Federal Bureau of Investigation (FBI) submitted eighteen adverse reports on Kaplan. He became chief advisor to the Military Government of Germany on financial and economic matters after 1945. He was employed by Weintraub in the United Nations Division of Economic Stability and Development from February 1946 through November 1952.

Kaplan's name appears in the VENONA decrypts.

== See also ==
- Elizabeth Bentley
- Perlo group

== External sources ==
- The shameful years; thirty years of Soviet espionage in the United States 1951)
