= Helen Tenney =

Helen Barrett Tenney worked for the Comintern apparatus in the 1930s and funnelled information to the Soviet Union on behalf of the Spanish Communists where she learned espionage tradecraft.

In 1942, Tenney worked for the New York City-based Short Wave Research, a company contracted to the Office of War Information to recruit persons knowledgeable in foreign languages.

In late summer of 1943, Tenney moved from New York to Washington, D.C. at the suggestion of Jacob Golos to obtain employment with the Spanish section of the Office of Strategic Services (OSS). She moved into Mary Price's former apartment which was used as a meeting point for government employees engaged in espionage and their Soviet case handlers and couriers.

Tenny began supplying reports and memoranda from OSS. This information included a considerable quantity of data on activities of OSS personnel in virtually all sections and all countries around the world. Tenney also supplied information concerning a monitoring station on Long Island.

Beginning in 1944, Tenney was being paid a regular stipend of $50 per month — considerable for the times — which had been arranged through Joseph Katz. In December 1944, Joseph Gregg became Tenney's handler, however Tenney complained about his technique and Gregg was replaced by Inez Munoz.

Tenney resigned from the OSS in June 1946 and transferred to the United States Department of State. By then the FBI had Tenney under surveillance. The State Department eased her out of her position and revoked her passport. In January 1947, Tenney had a nervous breakdown. She was confined to a psychiatric hospital for observation after a deadly combination of alcohol and phenobarbital which was regarded as a suicide attempt. Tenney remained unconscious for five days and upon regaining consciousness, was in a delirium and regarded as in a severe hallucinatory psychotic state. Her observers overheard Tenney mumbling about being followed, having her telephone tapped, having her friends under surveillance, and being a Russian spy. She then appeared to have a violent phobia against everything Russian, even the mention of the word "Russian", and was watched closely for another suicide attempt. Doctors, citing patient confidentiality, refused to discuss the case with FBI investigators.

By February 1946, unbeknownst to Tenney, her contact with Soviet intelligence Elizabeth Bentley, had defected and was cooperating with the counterintelligence investigation. Bentley visited with Tenney and concluded that her suicide attempt was genuine; Tenney felt alone and isolated not knowing the larger Soviet espionage operation had been compromised and that the Soviet controllers had broken off contact with their American agents. Tenney was unremorseful and appeared to wish to reestablish contact with Soviet handlers, dashing the FBI's hopes to gain her cooperation.

In June 1947, the FBI interviewed Tenney and determined she was in frail mental and physical health.

In 1998, Tenney was identified in the Venona project transcripts as code name "Muse", based on her transfer from the dismantled OSS to the Department of State.

== Sources ==
- FBI Silvermaster file 5d, pgs. 281-286
