= Viktor Vasilevish Sveshchnikov =

Spy for the Soviet union

Sveshchnikov, also known as Vladimir Vladimirovich De Sveshnikov, and V.V. Sveshnikov, was a spy for the Soviet Union who worked as a ballistics expert at the War Department in the 1930s.

Whittaker Chambers identified him to the FBI. Sveshchnikov reported to Soviet Agent handler Boris Bykov. When interviewed by the FBI, De Sveshnikov said he was first approached by Soviet intelligence in the mid-1920s, and from 1931 to 1938/39, he allegedly furnished Soviet intelligence with industrial and military patents as well as military journals and received regular payments in return.

In the Gorsky Memo, V.V. Sveshchnikov is identified by the code name "Rupert".

== Sources ==
- Vassiliev, Alexander (2003), Alexander Vassiliev's Notes on Anatoly Gorsky's December 1948 Memo on Compromised American Sources and Networks
