= Ruth Rifkin =

American spy (1912–1989)

- Born: February 1, 1912
- Died: July 24, 1989 (aged 77)
- Known for: worked for agency that became the UNRRA during World War II
- Notable work: spies that worked for Soviet intelligence

Ruth Rifkin (February 1, 1912 – July 24, 1989) was an American who worked for the predecessor agency which later became the United Nations Relief and Rehabilitation Administration (UNRRA) during World War II. Rifkin also was a source for Golos-Bentley network of spies that worked for Soviet intelligence and was engaged in espionage on behalf of the Soviet Union.
