= Francia Yakovlevna Mitinen =

Australian-born Soviet spy (born 1914)

Francia Yakovlevna Mitinen, originally Frances Metianen, and also known, erroneously, as "Francia Yakilnilna Mitynen" (born 31 January 1914, date of death unknown) was an Australian-born Soviet "illegal" spy for Soviet military intelligence (GRU) in the United States during the 1940s and 1950s. The main alias used by Mitinen in the US was Edna Margaret Patterson. Her codenames, in Soviet intelligence circles included "Салли" "Sally", and "Австралийка" "Avstraliyka", which (literally translated) is the feminine form of "(The) Australian". US counterintelligence services, however, usually translated the latter name as "The Australian Woman".

Mitinen was born at 85½ Morehead Street, Redfern, an inner suburb of Sydney, on 31 January 1914, according to a 2017 article by Australian historian and journalist Michael Connor. Her full name when her birth was registered was Frances Metianen, and her émigré Russian parents' names also appear in Australian records in the anglicised forms of James and Julie Metianen. Their older children, both of whom had been born before or shortly after the family arrived in Sydney, were known in Australia as Victor and Leonore (or Lena). James Metianen reportedly worked as a fitter at the Eveleigh Railway Workshops. In 1919, he was convicted of "selling a newspaper without a government licence" and fined A£5 – the publication concerned was reportedly sold to raise funds for a "Bolshevik" organisation based in Brisbane.

During the 1920s, the family apparently lived in the Parramatta area, where Frances attended Parramatta High School and the Metianen children took part in local sports teams, including Frances' brother Victor, who was frequently mentioned in newspaper reports regarding amateur cricket matches. Victor Metianen and his English-born wife Coral (née Sutcliffe) were also involved in communist and/or pro-Soviet political activities.

The entire Mitinen (Metianen) family, including Francia (Frances), Victor and Coral, apparently moved to the Soviet Union during the 1930s. Some members of the family were imprisoned on political grounds and, according to Connor, Victor Mitinen died in a Gulag during the early 1940s; his widow, Coral, was later allowed to visit relatives in England and died at Odessa (1966).

Before or during World War II, Francia Mitinen was recruited by the naval branch of the GRU. She entered the United States at San Francisco in August 1943, under the name of Edna Margaret Patterson (and a cover story that included growing up in Seattle). US counterintelligence services, as a result of the Venona signals interception and decryption project, became aware of some of the activities of "Sally" or the "Australian Woman", if not her cover name and whereabouts. Mitinen was apparently last mentioned in Venona intercepts during 1956. It is generally believed that she left the US (or disappeared) at around that time. Nothing is known of her subsequent life.
