= Clarence Hiskey =

American spy for the Soviet Union

- Born: Clarence Szczechowski; 1912
- Died: 1998 (aged 85–86)
- Education: University of Wisconsin
- Political party: Communist Party USA

Clarence Francis Hiskey (1912–1998), born Clarence Szczechowski, was a scientist who worked on the Manhattan Project and was identified as Soviet espionage agent. He became active in the Communist Party USA (CPUSA) when he attended graduate school at the University of Wisconsin.

He became a professor of chemistry at the University of Tennessee, Columbia University and Brooklyn Polytechnic Institute. For a time, Hiskey worked at the Tennessee Valley Authority and the University of Chicago Metallurgical Laboratory, part of the Manhattan Project. He was the father of Nicholas Sand.

Hiskey was identified as a Soviet agent while working on the Manhattan Project, providing sensitive nuclear information to the Soviet Union. He was neither arrested nor indicted and later fled to the Soviet Union.

== Metallurgical Laboratory ==
Hiskey joined the Chicago Metallurgical Laboratory in September 1943. In May 1944, a message sent by New York KGB to Moscow Venona project was intercepted and decrypted. The message contained information reporting that Bernard Schuster, member of the CPUSA secret apparatus, working for Soviet intelligence, had traveled to Chicago on the KGB's instructions. Although Hiskey was suspended after being indicted for contempt of Congress, he was reinstated after being acquitted. Nevertheless, he was never promoted, resigned his position as associate professor of analytical chemistry on the faculty of Brooklyn Polytechnic Institute and joined the International Biotechnical Corporation,. He later worked for a chemical company and as director of analytical research for Endo Laboratories. He died in 1998.

On 28 April 1944, Army counter-intelligence (G-2) observed a meeting between Clarence Hiskey and Soviet Military Intelligence (GRU) officer Arthur Adams. Hiskey was removed from the Manhattan Project by drafting him into the Army, and stationing him in Canada for the duration of the conflict. While en route, Army counter-intelligence officers secretly searched Hiskey's luggage and found seven pages of classified notes taken from the Chicago Metallurgical Lab. When the officers subsequently performed a follow-up search, the notes were no longer with Hiskey.

== Investigations ==
In 1948, the House Un-American Activities Committee (HUAC) established that Hiskey was an active member of the CPUSA and had attempted to recruit other scientists to pass secret atomic data to Soviet intelligence. Congressional investigators concluded:

It became obvious that Hiskey had for some time been supplying Adams with secret information regarding atomic research. Immediately after seeing Adams, Hiskey flew to Cleveland, Ohio, where he contacted John Hitchcock Chapin. Chapin, through the urging of Clarence Hiskey, agreed to take over Hiskey's contacts with Adams.

Chapin admitted to investigators that Hiskey had told him that Adams was indeed a Soviet agent. Edward Manning was another Chicago Met Lab employee Hiskey attempted to recruit.

In testimony before HUAC and Senate Internal Security Subcommittee, Hiskey repeatedly refused to answer questions about his Communist associations and espionage, and in 1950, he was cited for contempt of Congress. The FBI was completely unsure of the amount of information that Clarence Hiskey ended up passing to Arthur during his time during the Manhattan project. Even on his deathbed he denied any association to Russia the GRU never credited him. Hiskey resigned his position as associate professor of analytical chemistry on the faculty of Brooklyn Polytechnic Institute and joined the International Bio technical Corporation, later becoming director of analytical research for Endo Laboratories. Hiskey was suspended after being indicted for contempt of Congress, he was reinstated after being acquitted. He was never promoted, and in 1952 he finally resigned to become an industrial consultant.

== McCarthy ==
In June 1953, Hiskey was subpoenaed to testify before the Senate Subcommittee on Investigations. In a closed door session, Hiskey was interrogated by Sen. Joseph McCarthy:

Sen. McCarthy: "Were you engaged in atomic energy espionage?"

Mr. Hiskey: "I refuse to answer that question."

Then after some discussion of the Fifth Amendment,

Sen. McCarthy: "That is about as definite proof as we can get here that you were an espionage agent, because if you were not, you would simply say no. That would not incriminate you. The only time it would incriminate you would be if you were an espionage agent. So when you refuse to answer on the ground it would incriminate you, that is telling us you were an agent."

Mr. Hiskey: "I don't think you understand the whole purpose of the Fifth Amendment, Senator. That amendment was put into the Constitution to protect the innocent man from just this kind of star chamber proceeding you are carrying on."

The proceeding closed with,

Ray Cohn: "There is one other question. Can you tell us any names of any Communists working on the Manhattan project?"

Mr. Hiskey: "I refuse to answer that question."

Sen. McCarthy: "On the grounds of self-incrimination."

Mr. Hiskey: "On the grounds it may tend to incriminate me."

The subcommittee did not call Hiskey to testify in public.

The recommendations on May 27, 1954 of the Personnel Security Board of the U.S. Atomic Energy Commission investigation into J. Robert Oppenheimer, director of the Manhattan Project at Los Alamos, stated Oppenheimer had been found in the company of "Joseph W. Weinberg and Clarence Hiskey, who were alleged to be members of the Communist Party and to have engaged in espionage on behalf of the Soviet Union." Oppenheimer's security clearance was revoked the following month.

With the collapse of the Soviet Union, KGB Archives were made accessible to historian Allen Weinstein and a former KGB officer Alexander Vassiliev. The identification of Hiskey as a Soviet agent cover named RAMSAY which occurs in the Venona papers, corroborated Hiskey's covert relationship with Soviet intelligence.

== Bibliography ==
- US House of Representatives, 80th Congress, Special Session, Committee on Un-American Activities, Report on Soviet Espionage Activities in Connection with the Atom Bomb, September 28, 1948 (US Gov. Printing Office).
- Testimony of James Sterling Murray and Edward Tiers Manning, August 14, and October 5, 1949, U.S. Congress, House of Representatives, Committee on Un-American Activities, 81st Cong., 1st sess., 877–899.
- The Shameful Years: Thirty Years of Soviet Espionage in the United States, U.S. Congress, House of Representatives, Committee on Un-American Activities, 30 December 1951.
- Interlocking Subversion in Government Departments, Report of the Subcommittee to Investigate the Administration of the Internal Security Act and Other Internal Security Laws to the Committee of the Judiciary, United States Senate, 83rd Congress, 1st Session, July 30, 1953.
- United States Atomic Energy Commission, In the Matter of Dr. J. Robert Oppenheimer, Washington, D.C., 27 May 1954.
- FBI file Hiskey, Clarence NY-1000014092.
- FBI file Hiskey, Clarence HQ-1210020641.
- FBI file Hiskey, Clarence HQ-1010002118.
- Atomic Spy Report Will Shock Public, Official Declares, New York Times, September 26, 1948.
- William White, Indictment of Five Is Urged in Report on Atomic Spying, New York Times, September 28, 1948.
- LeRoy A. Stone, Married Couple Spies, West Virginia University, Psychology of Espionage Reports, Volume III, March 2002.
- Allen Weinstein and Alexander Vassiliev, The Haunted Wood: Soviet Espionage in America—the Stalin Era (New York: Random House, 1999).
- Katherine A S Sibley, Red spies in America : stolen secrets and the dawn of the Cold War, University Press of Kansas, 2004. ISBN 0-7006-1351-X
- Journal of Cold War Studies, Volume 25, Number 4, Fall 2023, The MIT Press, The First U.S.-Based Soviet Nuclear Spy Harvey Klehr (bio) and John Earl Haynes
