= Julius Joseph (spy) =

Julius J. Joseph was an American government official who was alleged to be a Soviet spy in the Venona Project transcripts. During World War II, he worked in the Office for Emergency Management (1942) and the Labor War Manpower Commission (1943) and from 1943 to 1945 for the Far Eastern section (Japanese intelligence) of the U.S. Office of Strategic Services (OSS) where his wife Bella Joseph also worked.

Venona decrypt 880 of 8 June 1943 from New York KGB Rezident Vasily Zarubin to KGB foreign intelligence head General Pavel Fitin in Moscow is about the OSS and the Office of War Information (OWI). It discusses the activities of five agents, or "probationers" as they are referred to, Maurice Halperin, Duncan Chapin Lee, Bella Joseph, Franz Neumann, and Julius Joseph.

In 1945, Joseph had become Deputy Chief of the Far Eastern Division. He is referred to as a Soviet source in the OSS in the Venona traffic under the cryptonym "Cautious".
