= Joseph Katz (Soviet agent) =

Joseph Katz (Hebrew: יוסף כץ; 1912–2004) worked for Soviet intelligence from the 1930s to the late 1940s as one of its most active liaison agents. Katz was assigned management of the "First Line," that part of the NKGB mission aimed at recruiting selected members of the Communist Party USA. He was an agent/group leader (gruppovik) and co-owner of a Soviet front company that manufactured gloves.

The Venona project suggests he may have been implicated, along with Amadeo Sabatini, in the murder of Walter Krivitsky in 1941. After the death of Jacob Golos in November 1943, spotting and recruitment was taken over by Katz by mid–1944, while Elizabeth Bentley continued as manager and courier. Katz was extremely active at this time. Katz was known to Elizabeth Bentley as "Jack".

In 1944, Katz was put in charge of handling agent recruitments from the New York City TASS office headed by Vladimir Pravdin, former rezident of the NKGB in New York. And in September 1944 Katz was freed of other liaisons (operations) and was assigned to work directly under Washington, D.C. Rezident Anatoli Gromov. Gromov came to the United States to implement a new security program of isolating agents from each other by a complicated arrangement of cutouts.

Katz and Bentley's operations in New York and Washington were very extensive. Bentley would eventually name more than 80 individuals who were providing information to Soviet intelligence from a dozen government institutions.

Katz informed Bentley at their first meeting in October 1944 that Gromov had been sent to the United States to improve security of NKGB operations. One aspect of this modernization was to have Bentley turn over to NKGB control all of her agents not previously surrendered to NKGB officers.

After Bentley's defection Katz was assigned the task of killing her. Anatoly Gorsky sent a memorandum to Moscow about Elizabeth Bentley. Allen Weinstein has pointed out: "Gorsky discussed and rejected in his November 27 memo a variety of options: shooting Bentley (too noisy), arranging a car or subway accident (too risky), and faking a suicide (too chancy). In connection with the last option, Gorsky noted that he had selected agent "X" (Joseph Katz) for the task of eliminating Bentley... In the end, Gorsky decided that a slow-acting poison should be administered to Bentley, something "X" could place on a pillow or handkerchief or in her food."

Gorsky warned NKVD headquarters that Joseph Katz was not in good health and that Bentley might cause him problems as she was "a very strong, tall and healthy woman, and 'X' was not feeling well lately". Eventually Gorsky was told that: "No measures should be taken with regard to (Bentley)." Gorsky was informed that it had been decided that Lavrentiy Beria would deal with Bentley. However, on 16 August 1947, Katz met the NKVD station chief in Paris to discuss the elimination of Bentley. It was reported that Katz was willing to take the assignment but at the last minute it was decided to abandon the idea.

Katz moved to Western Europe to form a company for covering the illegal courier line between Europe and U.S. Katz lived in France from 1948 to 1951 then moved to Israel. His code names in the Venona project are "X" and "Informer".
