= Gaik Ovakimian =

Soviet spy (1898–1967)

Haik Badalovich Ovakimian (Hayk Hovakimyan), Major General, USSR (11 August 1898, in Nakhchivan – 13 March 1967, in Moscow), better known as "the puppetmaster" in intelligence circles, was a leading Soviet NKVD spy in the United States.

Of Armenian descent, he was a member of the Communist Party from 1917 and joined the NKVD in 1931 while a graduate student at Moscow's Bauman Higher Technical School and went immediately into foreign intelligence.

Ovakimian was sent to Germany on an assignment emphasizing scientific-technical espionage. In 1932 he returned to the Soviet Union for advanced technical training at the Workers' and Peasants' Red Army Military-Chemical Academy. In 1933 he was sent to the United States as deputy head of the NKVD's scientific-technical intelligence section, operating under the cover of being an engineer for Amtorg.

The FBI agent, Robert J. Lamphere, has revealed that Gaik Ovakimian had been under investigation since soon after arriving in the United States. FBI files show that "Ovakimian's recruits were scattered as far afield as Mexico and Canada... Americans whom Ovakimian recruited or controlled described him as charming, serious, sympathetic, well read in English literature, knowledgeable in science, and a man who inspired loyalty in his agents. He must also have been agile and politically aware, for he survived the great purges of the late 1930s which decimated the upper ranks of the Russian espionage services."

While in the United States, Ovakimian ran the Golos spy ring and is credited with facilitating the assassination of Leon Trotsky. He was Jacob Golos's primary contact. Ovakimian also received material from Klaus Fuchs through Harry Gold. Julius and Ethel Rosenberg were recruited by Ovakimian in 1938.

In 1939 Ovakimian became chief of scientific intelligence in the United States while at the same time began studying for a doctorate in chemistry at a New York University.

Ovakimian was arrested during a meeting on 5 May 1941 with an agent who had been turned by the FBI. After the German invasion of the Soviet Union on 22 June 1941, he was traded back to Moscow for the release of several Americans and left the United States 23 July 1941.

Ovakimian then became head of the NKVD's American desk in Moscow, responsible for espionage activities of Soviet agents within the United States and Canada. He was promoted to deputy chief of the NKVD's foreign intelligence in 1943 and attained the rank of major-general. A hitherto unknown memo from Ovakimian, head of the KGB's American desk, notes that "following our instructions," Harry Dexter White "attained the positive decision of the US Treasury Department to provide the Soviet side with the plates for engraving German occupation marks."

In 1946 Ovakimian left the NKVD to engage in full-time scientific work, as a chemical engineer. Possessing prodigious talent in mathematics as well as in chemistry, Ovakimian was responsible for the rapid development of the Soviet chemical arsenal in the 1950s as well as the application of agricultural chemistry for civilian purposes.

Ovakimian is identified in the Venona project decrypts as "Gennady".
