= Foreign Economic Administration =

In the administration of Franklin Delano Roosevelt, the Foreign Economic Administration (FEA) was formed on September 25, 1943 to relieve friction between US agencies operating abroad.

== Establishment ==
The FEA was organized and run by Leo Crowley who was described by his biographer Stuart L. Weiss as "The Nation's #1 Pinch-hitter". Weiss summed up Crowley's management style this way: "Based on his own success in Washington, he had concluded that sound administration meant clearly demarcating lines of authority between agencies and, within each, finding the right staff and giving it only the most basic guidance and coordination".

Weiss' evidence for Crowley's hand in creating the FEA is a memo he sent to James Byrnes on September 21, 1943, giving his "assessment of the conflict and confusion among the economic agencies operating abroad." His lengthy memorandum argued that "the major culprit was the State Department, which interfered with (or micromanaged) the execution of policy when it should only formulate and coordinate it. That led to problems in the field, ranging from wasteful duplication or the more critical problems of needless delays and confusion".

Weiss explains: "The British … were complaining of difficulty in dealing with 'conflicting jurisdictions' in North Africa; and the New York Times was emphasizing 'uncertainty regarding the representative spheres of OEW (Office of Economic Warfare), Lend-Lease, and OFRRO (Office of Foreign Relief and Rehabilitation Operations) … friction between OEW and the War Food Administration as regards foreign food purchases".

According to the New York Times, September 26, 1943, on the occasion of the establishment of the FEA, Roosevelt said that [Crowley is] "one of the best administrators in or out of government, [whom] I find great satisfaction in promoting … to a position which will centralize all foreign economic operations in one operating agency".

When the war was over, Harry Truman closed down the FEA. As he explained in his Memoirs, "When the FEA had been formed in 1943 as a wartime agency, the move involved a merger of all or parts of forty-three different agencies. The functions and services with which it had been charged were such that it could not be stopped suddenly. ... I issued an Executive Order on September 27 terminating the FEA ... not later than December 31, 1945".

In 2007 Martin Lorenz-Meyer published a book that investigated one of FEA's public programs. Naturally the author sketches the career of administrator Leo Crowley (p. 22,25,26) and his organization of the FEA:

Crowley quickly got to work streamlining his new realm of 4,009 employees at home and abroad. He merged fourteen agencies combined into FEA into four and created two bureaus, the Bureau of Areas and the Bureau of Supplies. In general the Bureau of Areas was in charge of determining the needs of the various regions of the world, while the supply side was then responsible for fulfilling those requirements …
… the FEA was in charge of a dazzling array of functions…
The global dimension of the FEA is demonstrated by the fact that in 1944 it had forty-three offices total, with some on every continent except Antarctica.

== Misstep ==
In 1955 Harry Truman recounted in detail in his Memoirs an early incident in the breakdown in the alliance with Russia after the war:

I had my first bad experience in the problem of delegating authority. Leo Crowley, Foreign Economic Administrator, and Joseph C. Grew, Acting Secretary of State, came into my office after the Cabinet meeting on May 8 and said they had an important order in connection with Lend-Lease which President Roosevelt had approved but not signed. It was an order authorizing the FEA and the State Department to take joint action to cut back the volume of Lend-Lease supplies when Germany surrendered. What they told me made good sense to me; with Germany out of the war, Lend-Lease should be reduced. They asked me to sign it, I reached for my pen and, without reading the document, I signed it.

The storm broke almost at once. The manner in which the order was executed was unfortunate. Crowley interpreted the order literally and placed an embargo on all shipments to Russia and to other European nations, even to the extent of having some ships turned around and brought back to American ports for unloading. The British were hardest hit, but the Russians interpreted the move as especially aimed at them. Because we were furnishing Russia with immense quantities of food, clothing, arms and ammunition, this sudden and abrupt interruption of Lend-Lease aid stirred up a hornets' nest in that country. The Russians complained about our unfriendly attitude. We had unwittingly given Stalin a point of contention which he would undoubtedly bring up every chance he had.

== See also ==
Herbert H. Lehman
United Nations Relief and Rehabilitation Administration
