= FBI Silvermaster File =

Documents about Russian moles in the US government

The Silvermaster File of the United States' Federal Bureau of Investigation is a 162-volume compendium totalling 26,000 pages of documents relating to the FBI's investigation of GRU and NKVD moles and spy rings inside the U.S. federal government both before and during the Cold War.

Beginning in 1945 with the allegations of defector and former NKVD courier Elizabeth Bentley (Venona cover names "Myrna"; Umnitsa, "Clever Girl"), the file is also known as the Bentley file or Gregory file ("Gregory" was the FBI code name for Bentley).

The file takes its name from Nathan Gregory Silvermaster (Venona cover names Pel, Pal, "Paul"; "Robert") of the War Production Board, whom Bentley named as head of an underground Communist network known as the Silvermaster Group. Among the people named in the file in connection with this group are President Franklin Roosevelt's Administrative Assistant Lauchlin Currie (Venona cover name "Page") and Assistant Secretary of the Treasury Harry Dexter White (Venona cover names "Lawyer"; "Jurist"; "Richard").

Also named in the file are Victor Perlo (Venona cover name "Raider"), chief of the Aviation Section of the War Production Board, and contacts of his Perlo group, including Alger Hiss (Venona cover name "Ales"), secretary general of the United Nations Charter Conference. (Like several others identified by Bentley, Hiss had been identified independently by another defecting Soviet courier, Whittaker Chambers, to Assistant Secretary of State Adolf Berle in 1939.) Among dozens of others named by Bentley in this file in connection with this network is Duncan Lee (Venona cover name "Koch"), confidential assistant to William Donovan, founder and director of the Office of Strategic Services (OSS), wartime predecessor of the CIA.

== Prosecutions ==
Original plans for Bentley to serve as a double agent and gather sufficient evidence to prosecute the Soviet agents identified in the Silvermaster files were ruined when her identity was inadvertently leaked and the USSR quickly shut down its operations. The Silvermaster file in combination with other secret proofs such as the Venona intercepts gave US intelligence the identity of many Soviet agents without the practical means to secure convictions. Also, the statute of limitations for an espionage prosecution was quite short. This was a significant part of the backstory of McCarthyism. Bentley's double agent career would have enabled the US to expose the spies without compromising Venona and losing that as an ongoing intelligence source.

== See also ==
- Active measures
- History of Soviet and Russian espionage in the United States
- List of Soviet agents in the United States
