= Harry Dexter White =

American economist and accused spy (1892–1948)

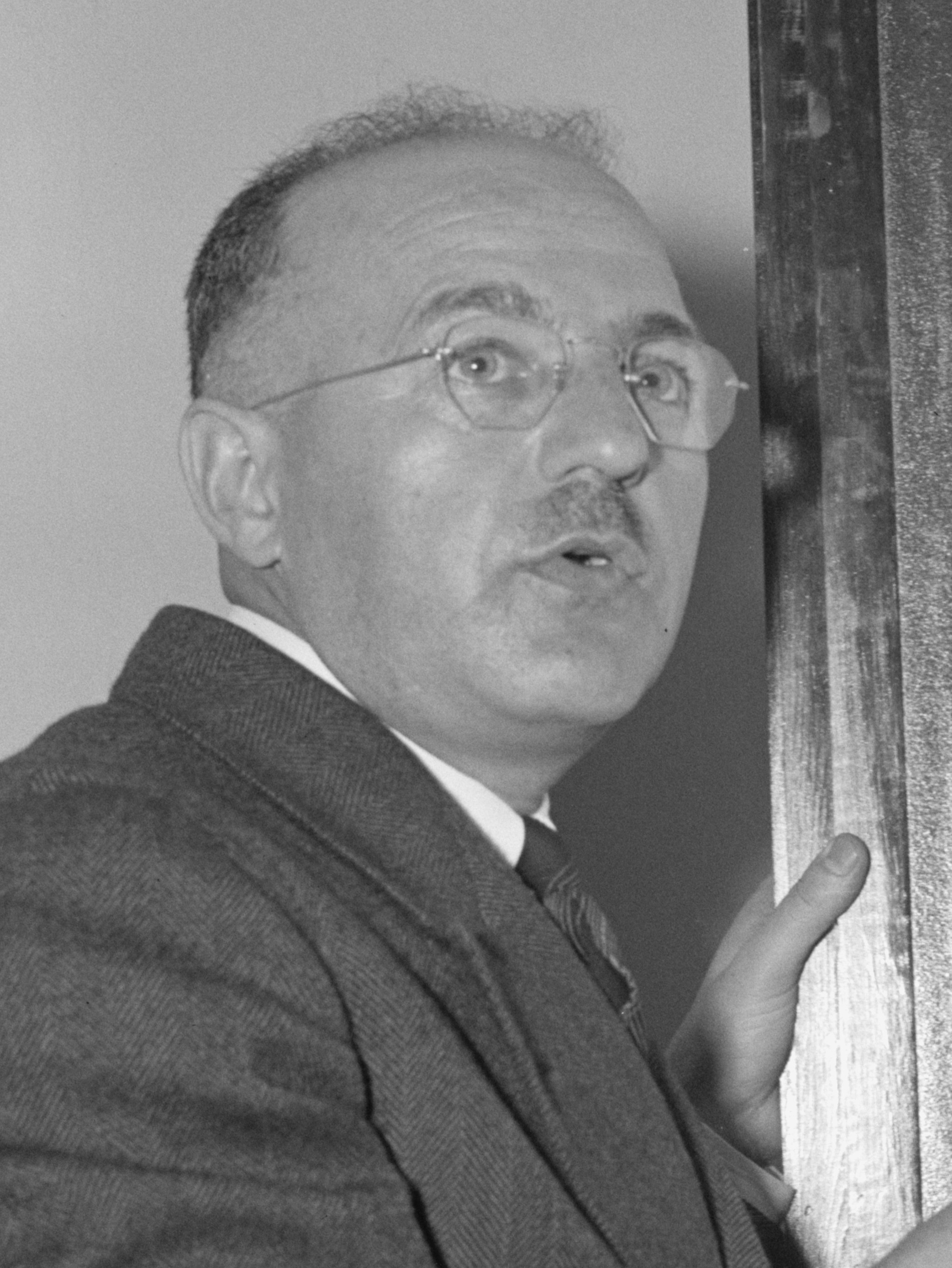
- White in 1939
- Born: October 29, 1892; Boston, Massachusetts, U.S.
- Died: August 16, 1948 (aged 55); Fitzwilliam, New Hampshire, U.S.
- Education: Columbia University; Stanford University (BA, MA); Harvard University (PhD)
- Occupation: Economist
- Employer(s): Lawrence University; U.S. Treasury department International Monetary Fund
- Known for: Bretton Woods agreement First U.S. Director of IMF (1946-47)
- Spouse: Anne Terry (m. 1918)
- Children: 2

Harry Dexter White (October 29, 1892 – August 16, 1948) was an American government official in the United States Department of the Treasury. Working closely with the secretary of the treasury Henry Morgenthau Jr., he helped set American financial policy toward the Allies of World War II. He was later found to be a soviet spy after passing information to the Soviet Union.

He was a senior American official at the 1944 Bretton Woods Conference that established the postwar economic order. He dominated the conference, and his vision of post-war financial institutions mostly prevailed over those of John Maynard Keynes, the British representative who was the other main founder. Through Bretton Woods, White was a major architect of the International Monetary Fund and World Bank.

White was accused in 1948 of spying for the Soviet Union, which he adamantly denied. He was never a Communist Party member, but he had frequent contacts with Soviet officials as part of his duties at the Treasury, passed sensitive and classified documents to people he knew were agents of the Soviet Union, and influenced policy which benefitted the Soviet Union, including maneuvering to keep tensions between Japan and the United States high. This evidence came to light prior to his death via decoded Soviet cables in the Venona Project, and later with the opening of Soviet archives in the 1990s.

== Background ==
Harry Dexter White was born on October 29, 1892, in Boston, Massachusetts, the seventh and youngest child of Jewish Lithuanian immigrants, Jacob Weissnovitz (or Weit) and Sarah Magilewski, who had settled in the US in the 1880s. In 1917, he enlisted in the U.S. Army, and was commissioned as a First Lieutenant and served in France as head of Company H of the 302nd Infantry until the end of World War I. Aside from one term at Massachusetts Agricultural College (1911–12), he did not begin his university studies until age 29, first at Columbia University where he studied government starting from 1922; then, after three terms there, at Stanford University, where he earned bachelor's and master's degrees in economics; and finally at Harvard University, where he taught for four years while studying for his PhD, which he completed in 1932 at 40 years of age. White then taught for two years at Lawrence College in Appleton, Wisconsin. His PhD dissertation won the David A. Wells Prize granted annually by the Harvard University Department of Economics. Harvard University Press published his PhD thesis in 1933, as The French International Accounts, 1880–1913.

== Treasury Department ==
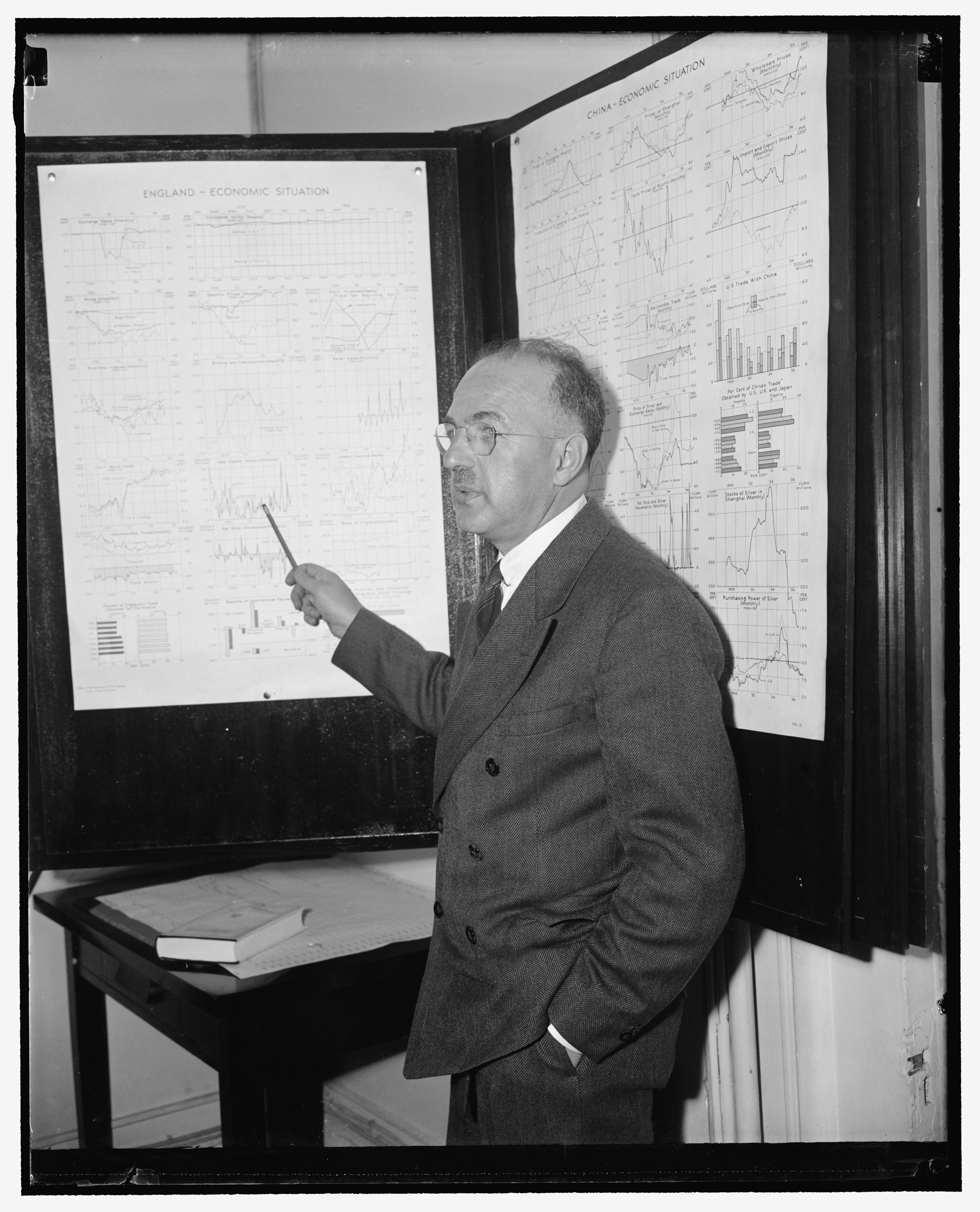
White in 1939 while working for the U.S. Treasury

In 1934, Jacob Viner, an economist working at the Treasury Department, offered White a position at the Treasury, which he accepted. Viner would receive an honorary degree from Lawrence University, where White taught before joining the Treasury, in 1941. White became increasingly important in monetary matters, and was a top advisor to Secretary of the Treasury Henry Morgenthau Jr., especially on international financial affairs dealing with China, France, Great Britain, Japan, Latin America, and the Soviet Union. In 1938, Morgenthau created a new division—the Division of Monetary Research—and promoted White to be its director. When the United States entered World War II in 1941, Morgenthau promoted White again, naming him Assistant to the Secretary. The post of Assistant Secretary, the most senior economist position in the Treasury, finally opened up in 1945, and Morgenthau promptly nominated White to fill it. White left the Treasury in 1946 to become the U.S. Executive Director at the newly established International Monetary Fund.

=== Japan policy ===
In November 1941, White sent a memorandum to Morgenthau that was widely circulated and influenced State Department planning. White called for a comprehensive peaceful solution of rapidly escalating tensions between the United States and Japan, calling for major concessions on both sides. Langer and Gleason report that White's proposals were totally rewritten by the State Department and that the American key demand had been formulated long before White. It was an insistence on Japanese withdrawal from China, which Japan totally refused to consider. The complex negotiations at the top ranks of the US government, and its key allies of Britain and China, took place in late November 1941 with no further input from White or Morgenthau. White's proposals were never presented to Japan. Some historians have argued, however, that White manipulated Morgenthau and Roosevelt to provoke war with Japan in order to protect Stalin's Far Eastern front.

After the U.S. entered the war in December 1941, Secretary Morgenthau appointed White to act as liaison between the Treasury and the State Department on all matters bearing on foreign relations. He was also made responsible for the Exchange Stabilization Fund. White eventually came to be in charge of wartime international matters for the Treasury, with access to extensive confidential information about the economic situation of the US and its wartime allies. He passed numerous secret documents to men he knew were Soviet spies.

White was a dedicated internationalist, and his energies were directed at continuing the Grand Alliance with the USSR and maintaining peace through trade. He believed that powerful, multilateral institutions could avoid the mistakes of the Treaty of Versailles and prevent another worldwide depression. As head of the independently funded Office of Monetary Research, White was able to hire staff without the normal civil service regulations or background enquiries. He probably was unaware that several of his hires were spies for the USSR.

=== Morgenthau Plan ===
According to Henry Morgenthau's son, White was the principal architect behind the Morgenthau Plan, designed to permanently weaken Germany's military capabilities. The Morgenthau postwar plan, as authored by White, was to take all industry out of Germany, eliminate its armed forces, and convert the country into an agricultural community, in the process eliminating most of Germany's economy and its ability to start another war. A version of the plan, limited to turning Germany into "a country primarily agricultural and pastoral in its character", was signed by President Franklin D. Roosevelt and the British Prime Minister Winston Churchill at the Second Quebec Conference in September 1944. However, someone in White's department with access to details of the plan leaked it to the press, and White himself provided an advance copy to Soviet intelligence. Public protests forced Roosevelt to publicly and partially pull back. The Nazis and Joseph Goebbels used the Morgenthau Plan as a propaganda coup to encourage their troops and citizens to fight on. General Omar Bradley, among others, noticed "a near-miraculous revitalization of the German army." In the end Morgenthau still did manage to influence the resulting occupation policy.

=== Bretton Woods Conference ===
White was the senior American official at the 1944 Bretton Woods Conference, and reportedly dominated the conference and imposed his vision over the objections of John Maynard Keynes, the British representative. Numerous economic historians have concluded that White and the powerful U.S. delegation were wrong in dismissing Keynes's innovative proposal for a new international unit of currency (the "Bancor") made up of foreign exchange reserves held by central banks. Benn Steil, in 2013, argued that since 1971, experts have been disillusioned with the 1944 framework. Eric Helleiner, in 2014, argued that the main goal of the United States was to promote international development as an investment in peace, to open the world for cheap imports, and to create new markets for American exports. He argues that policy-makers and analysts from the Southern hemisphere increasingly denounced the Bretton Woods system as "a Northern-dominated arrangement that was ill-suited to their state-led development strategies."

After the war, White was closely involved with setting up what were called the Bretton Woods institutions—the International Monetary Fund (IMF) and the World Bank. These institutions were intended to prevent some of the economic problems that had occurred after World War I. As late as November 1945, White continued to argue for improved relations with the Soviet Union. White later became a director and U.S. representative of the IMF. On June 19, 1947, White abruptly resigned from the International Monetary Fund, vacating his office the same day.

== Accusations of espionage ==
=== Chambers' accusations 1939, 1945, 1948 ===
On September 2, 1939, Assistant Secretary of State and Roosevelt's adviser on internal security Adolf Berle had a meeting, arranged by journalist Isaac Don Levine, with defecting Soviet agent Whittaker Chambers. In his notes of that meeting, written later that night, Levine listed a series of names, including a "Mr. White". Berle's notes of the meeting contain no mention of White. Berle drafted a 4-page memorandum on the information which he then passed to the President, who dismissed the idea of espionage rings in his administration as 'absurd'. The director of the FBI, J. Edgar Hoover, as late as 1942, also dismissed Chambers' revelations as 'history, hypothesis, or deduction.'

On March 20, 1945, State Department security officer Raymond Murphy interviewed Chambers. His notes record that Chambers identified White as "a member at large but rather timid", who had brought various members of the American communist underground into the Treasury.

In Spring 1948, Truman aide Stephen J. Spingarn questioned Whittaker Chambers, an admitted former Soviet espionage agent, about Harry Dexter White: "Chambers ... told me that he didn't believe Harry White was a Communist; he believed that he was a man who thought he was smarter than the Communists, and he could use them, but really they used him." Chambers subsequently testified on August 3, 1948, to his association with White in the Communist underground secret apparatus up to 1938. Chambers produced documents he had saved from his days as a courier for the Soviets' American spy-ring. Among these was a handwritten memorandum that he testified White had given him. The Treasury Department identified this document as containing highly confidential material from the State Department, while the FBI Laboratory established that it was written in White's handwriting. Chambers stated, however, that White was the least productive of his contacts. Chambers said of White, "His motives always baffled me" (a point later underscored by grandson David Chambers).

=== Bentley accusations 1945, 1948, 1953 ===
On November 7, 1945, defecting Soviet espionage courier Elizabeth Bentley told investigators of the Federal Bureau of Investigation (FBI) that in late 1942 or early 1943 she learned from Soviet spies Nathan Gregory Silvermaster and Ludwig Ullmann that one source of the government documents they were photographing and passing on to her and NKVD spymaster Jacob Golos was Harry Dexter White.

The next day, FBI Director J. Edgar Hoover sent a hand-delivered letter to Truman's Military Aide, Gen. Harry Vaughan, at the White House, reporting information that "a number of persons employed by the government of the United States have been furnishing data and information to persons outside the Federal Government, who are in turn transmitting this information to espionage agents of the Soviet government." The letter listed a dozen Bentley suspects, the second of whom was Harry Dexter White.

The FBI summarized the Bentley information and in its follow-up investigation on the suspects she named, again including White, in a report entitled 'Soviet Espionage in the United States', which was sent to the White House, the Attorney General and the State Department on December 4, 1945. Six weeks later, on January 23, 1946, Truman nominated White as U.S. Director of the International Monetary Fund. The FBI responded with a 28-page memo specifically on White and his contacts, received by the White House on February 4, 1946. White's nomination was approved by the Senate, acting in ignorance of the allegations against White, on February 6, 1946.

(Six years later, Truman would testify that White had been "separated from the Government service promptly" upon receipt of this information—first from the Treasury, and then from the IMF. In fact, White was still at the IMF on June 19, 1947—more than two years after the FBI had alerted the White House about him—when he abruptly resigned (vacating his office the same day), after Attorney General Tom Clark ordered a Federal grand jury investigation of the Bentley charges.)

On July 31, 1948, Bentley told the House Committee on Un-American Activities that White had been involved in espionage activities on behalf of the Soviet Union during World War II, and had passed sensitive Treasury documents to Soviet agents. Bentley said White's colleagues passed information to her from him. In her 1953 testimony Bentley said that White was responsible for passing Treasury plates for printing Allied military marks in occupied Germany to the Soviets, who thereupon printed currency with abandon, sparking a black market and serious inflation throughout the occupied country, costing the U.S. a quarter of a billion dollars. However the alternative explanation is that Treasury officials feared that denying Soviet use of the plates in their occupation sector would endanger postwar cooperation.

Bentley wrote in her 1951 autobiography that she had been "able through Harry Dexter White to arrange that the United States Treasury Department turn the actual printing plates over to the Russians". Bentley had not previously mentioned this to the FBI or to any of the committees, grand juries or prosecutors before whom she had testified earlier, and there was no evidence at the time that Bentley had any role in this transfer. Some questioned Harry Dexter White's role in it. In her 1953 testimony before Joseph McCarthy's Senate subcommittee, she elaborated, testifying that she was following instructions from NKVD New York rezident Iskhak Abdulovich Akhmerov (who operated under the cover name "Bill") to pass word through Ludwig Ullmann and Nathan Gregory Silvermaster for White to "put the pressure on for the delivery of the plates to Russia". This is the only case in which Bentley biographer Kathryn Olmsted concluded that Bentley was lying about her role, citing historian Bruce Craig's conclusion that "the whole 'scheme' was a complete fabrication". However, Bentley's testimony would later be corroborated in dramatic fashion by a memorandum found in Soviet archives after half a century. In it, Gaik Ovakimian, head of the American desk of the NKVD (for which Bentley worked), cites a report from New York (where Bentley was based) from April 14, 1944 (when Bentley was running the Silvermaster group) reporting that, "following our instructions" via Silvermaster, White had obtained "the positive decision of the Treasury Department to provide the Soviet side with the plates for engraving German occupation marks".

== Personal life ==
In 1918, White married Anne Terry. They had two daughters, Ruth (May 11, 1926 - December 28, 2009) and Joan (March 12, 1929 - September 9, 2012).

On August 13, 1948, White testified before HUAC and denied being a communist. After he finished testifying, he had a heart attack. He left Washington for a rest on his Fitzwilliam, New Hampshire farm. He had just arrived when he had another heart attack. Two days later, on August 16, 1948, he died, age 55. Spurious allegations later made it look as if an overdose of digoxin was the cause of death.

== Legacy ==
=== Accusations by Jenner and McCarthy 1953 ===
Senator William Jenner's Interlocking Subversion in Government Departments Investigation by the Senate Internal Security Subcommittee (SISS) looked extensively into the problem of unauthorized and uncontrolled powers exercised by non-elected officials, specifically White. Part of its report looked into the implementation of Roosevelt administration policy in China and was published as the Morgenthau Diary (China). The report stated:

The concentration of Communist sympathizers in the Treasury Department, and particularly the Division of Monetary Research, is now a matter of record. White was the first director of that division; those who succeeded him in the directorship were Frank Coe and Harold Glasser. Also attached to the Division of Monetary Research were William Ludwig Ullman, Irving Kaplan, and Victor Perlo. White, Coe, Glasser, Kaplan, and Perlo were all identified as participants in the Communist conspiracy...

The committee also heard testimony by Henry Morgenthau's speechwriter, Jonathan Mitchell, that White had tried to persuade him that the Soviets had developed a system that would supplant capitalism and Christianity.

In 1953, Senator Joseph McCarthy and Eisenhower administration Attorney General Herbert Brownell Jr. revealed that the FBI had warned the Truman administration about White before the President appointed him to the IMF. Brownell made public the FBI's November 8, 1945, letter to the White House warning about White and others, and revealed that the White House had received the FBI report on "Soviet Espionage in the United States," including the White case, six weeks before Truman nominated White to the IMF.

Although he does not dispute that the FBI sent these and other warnings to Truman, Sen. Daniel Patrick Moynihan wrote in his introduction to the 1997 Moynihan Commission report on government secrecy that Truman was never informed of Venona. In support of this, he cited a statement from the official NSA/CIA history of Venona that "no definitive evidence has emerged to show" that Truman was informed of Venona.

=== Venona project ===
NSA cryptographers identified Harry Dexter White as the source denoted in the Venona decrypts at various times under the code names "Lawyer", "Richard", and "Jurist". Two years after his death, in a memorandum dated October 15, 1950, White was positively identified by the FBI, through evidence gathered by the Venona project, as a Soviet source, code named "Jurist".

Years later, the Justice Department publicly disclosed the existence of the Venona project which deciphered Soviet cable traffic naming White as "Jurist", a Soviet intelligence source. As reported in the FBI Memorandum on White:

You have previously been advised of information obtained from [Venona] regarding Jurist, who was active during 1944. According to the previous information received from [Venona] regarding Jurist, during April, 1944, he had reported on conversations between the then Secretary of State Hull and Vice President Wallace. He also reported on Wallace's proposed trip to China. On August 5, 1944, he reported to the Soviets that he was confident of President Roosevelt's victory in the coming elections unless there was a huge military failure. He also reported that Truman's nomination as Vice President was calculated to secure the vote of the conservative wing of the Democratic Party. It was also reported that Jurist was willing for any self-sacrifice in behalf of the KGB but was afraid that his activities, if exposed, might lead to a political scandal and have an effect on the elections.

This codename was confirmed by the notes of KGB archivist Vasili Nikitich Mitrokhin, in which six key Soviet agents are named. Harry Dexter White is listed as being first "KASSIR" and later "JURIST".

Another example of White acting as an agent of influence for the Soviet Union was his obstruction of a proposed $200 million loan to Nationalist China in 1943, which he had been officially instructed to execute, at a time when inflation was spiraling out of control.

Other Venona decrypts revealed further damaging evidence against White, including White's suggestions on how to meet and pass information on to his Soviet handler. Venona Document #71 contains decryptions of White's discussions on being paid for his work for the Soviet Union.

In 1997, the bipartisan Moynihan Commission on Government Secrecy, chaired by Democratic Senator Daniel Patrick Moynihan, stated in its findings, "The complicity of Alger Hiss of the State Department seems settled. As does that of Harry Dexter White of the Treasury Department."

Further evidence of White's complicity as a Soviet agent was gleaned from Soviet archives and former KGB operative Alexander Vassiliev. In a book by Allen Weinstein and Alexander Vassiliev, The Haunted Wood: Soviet Espionage in America — the Stalin Era, Vassiliev, a former Soviet journalist and KGB operative, reviewed Soviet archives dealing with White's actions on behalf of the Soviet Union. White assisted Harold Glasser, a Treasury executive and NKVD spy, "in obtaining posts and promotions at Treasury while aware of his Communist ties". Because of White's backing, Glasser survived an FBI background check.

In December 1941 the Secret Service forwarded a report to Harry White indicating that it had evidence Glasser was involved in Communist activities. White never acted on the report. Glasser continued to serve in the Treasury Department, and soon began recruiting other agents and preparing briefing reports on Treasury personnel and other potential espionage agents for the NKVD. After America became involved in World War II, Glasser received appointments to several higher-level positions in the government on White's approval.

According to Soviet archives, White's other KGB code names were "Richard", and "Reed". In order to protect their source, Soviet intelligence repeatedly changed White's code name.

=== Assessments of Soviet involvement ===
In 2000, Robert Skidelsky, in reviewing the evidence, concludes:

A combination of naivety, superficiality and supreme confidence in his own judgment — together with his background — explains the course of action White took. There is no question of treachery, in the accepted sense of betraying one's country's secrets to an enemy. But there can be no doubt that, in passing classified information to the Soviets, White knew he was betraying his trust, even if he did not thereby think he was betraying his country.

In 2004, Stephen Schlesinger wrote, "Among historians, the verdict about White is still unresolved, but many incline toward the view that he wanted to help the Russians but did not regard the actions he took as constituting espionage." In 2012, Bruce Craig wrote:

Taken individually, one could argue that some of the documents indicate that White may have not always have been aware that his information was being passed on to Moscow, but taken collectively, [Andrew] Vassiliev's documentation leaves little wiggle room for White's defenders to continue to assert that he was not involved in an activity that, at least by present day legal standards, constitute espionage.

In 2012, David Chambers wrote, "Perhaps White had ends of his own, too... Perhaps he used his position to foster the Soviet Union — then a new, budding American ally, recognized only in 1933 — beyond New Deal policy."

In 2013, Benn Steil wrote:

White almost certainly, and over many years, gave confidential and classified U.S. government information–in original, transcribed, and oral form–to individuals whom he knew would ultimately transmit it to the Soviet government ... Yet the economics White advocated were hardly Marxist. They were by this time what would be described as thoroughly Keynesian ... As for White's domestic politics, these were mainstream New Deal progressive, and there is no evidence that he admired communism as a political ideology. It is this chasm between what is known publicly of White's economic and political views, on the one hand, and his clandestine behavior on behalf of the Soviets, on the other, that accounts for the plethora of unpersuasive profiles of the man that have emerged.

White's daughters steadfastly maintained his innocence. In 1990, they stated, "Despite years of close surveillance by the Federal Bureau of Investigation, which included shadowing and wiretaps, the evidence produced against White never consisted of anything more than the unsubstantiated allegations of two F.B.I. informers unknown to the accused (including Time magazine's own Whittaker Chambers)."

In 1998, daughter Joan White Pinkham wrote on behalf of her sister Ruth White Levitan and herself, "Nevertheless, as the daughters of a brilliant economist who served his country loyally and with distinction, my sister and I remain confident that, in the words of Coventry Patmore, 'The truth is great, and shall prevail, / When none cares whether it prevail or not'."

In 2012, Joan White Pinkam wrote, "I write to protest that in Benn Steil’s April 9 Op-Ed article, "Banker, Tailor, Soldier, Spy," old allegations of espionage against my father, Harry Dexter White, are once again repeated as fact. In response to the 2012 statement, Whittaker Chambers' grandson, David Chambers, wrote:

Ms. Pinkham does well to stand by her father. Full proof of White's doings may never surface. Even if they should, one cannot deny that he helped better the financial system, towards a better world. His achievements remain standing at the U.S. Treasury, Bretton Woods, and the IMF. So does his American creed before HUAC. In contrast, Whittaker Chambers tried at best to neutralize dupes of Stalin-ized communism—long after Stalin had started liquidating every conceivable enemy. (But that does not cancel out Chambers's insight into White.)

== See also ==
- Svetlana Chervonnaya
- List of American spies
- John Abt
- Noel Field
- John Herrmann
- Donald Hiss
- J. Peters
- Ward Pigman
- Lee Pressman
- Vincent Reno
- Julian Wadleigh
- Harold Ware
- Nathaniel Weyl
- Nathan Witt
