= Elizabeth Bentley =

Cold War Soviet spy

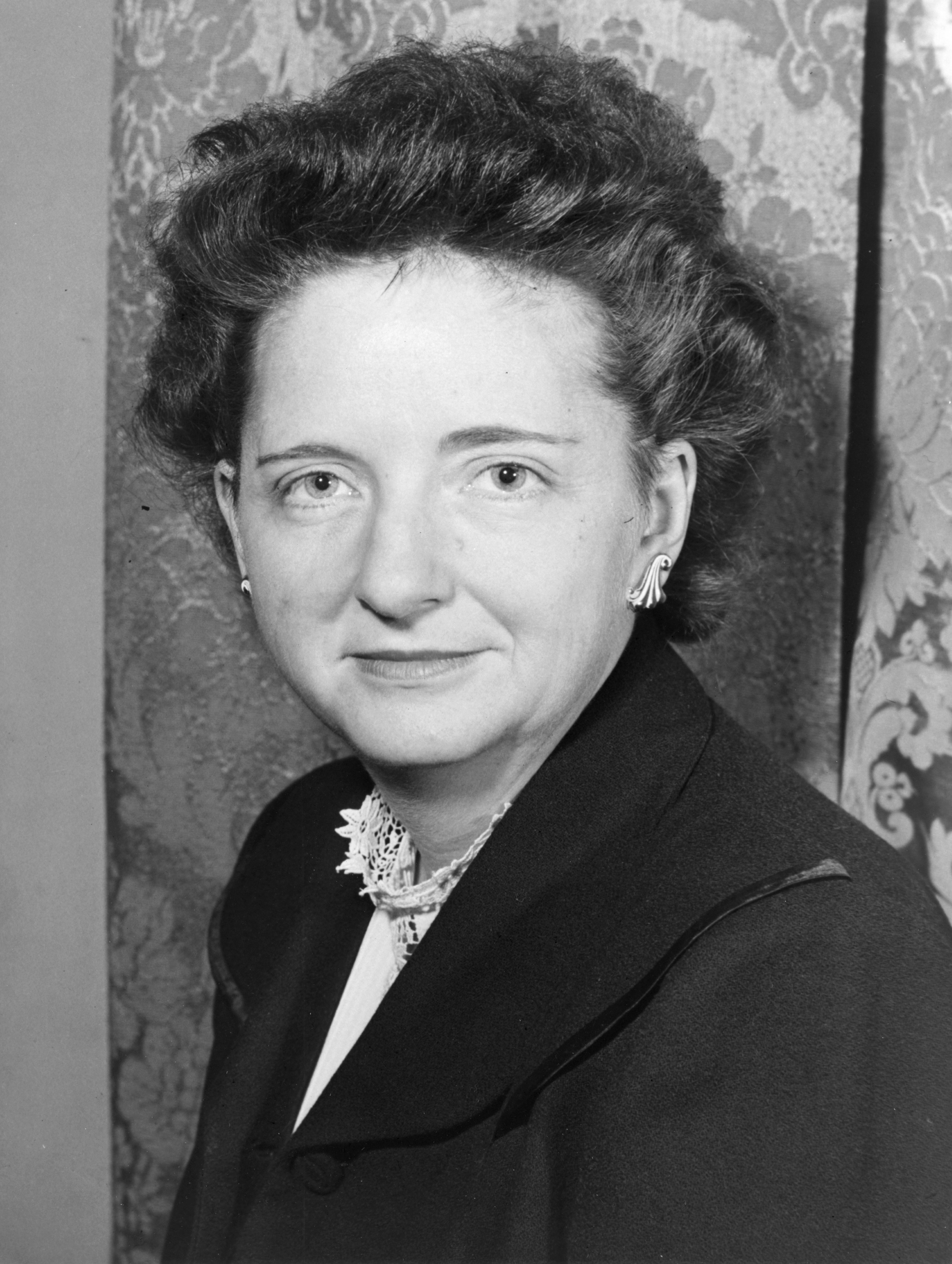
- Bentley in 1948
- Born: Elizabeth Terrill Bentley; January 1, 1908; New Milford, Connecticut, U.S.
- Died: December 3, 1963 (aged 55); Grace-New Haven Hospital, New Haven, Connecticut, U.S.
- Education: Vassar College (1926–1930); Columbia University (1933); University of Florence
- Occupations: Teacher, spy
- Espionage activity
- Allegiance: Soviet Union (defected); United States
- Service branch: Communist Party USA (defected); FBI
- Codename: Gregory

Elizabeth Terrill Bentley (January 1, 1908 – December 3, 1963) was an American NKVD spymaster, who was recruited from within the Communist Party USA (CPUSA). She served the Soviet Union as the primary handler of multiple highly placed moles within both the United States federal government and the Office of Strategic Services from 1938 to 1945. She defected by contacting the Federal Bureau of Investigation (FBI) and debriefing about her espionage activities. Her writings include Out of Bondage: The Story of Elizabeth Bentley.

Bentley became widely known after testifying as a prosecution witness in a number of trials and before the United States Congress' House Un-American Activities Committee (HUAC). Bentley was subsequently paid by the FBI for both her assistance in counterespionage investigations and her testimony before Congressional subcommittees. Bentley exposed two spy networks and ultimately accused more than 80 U.S. citizens of both treason and espionage for a foreign power.

== Early life ==
Elizabeth Terrill Bentley was born in New Milford, Connecticut, the daughter of dry-goods merchant Charles Prentiss Bentley and schoolteacher May Charlotte Turrill. Her parents moved to Ithaca, New York, in 1915 and, by 1920, the family had relocated to McKeesport, Pennsylvania. Later that year, they returned to New York, settling in Rochester. Bentley's parents were described as strait-laced Episcopalians from New England.

She attended Vassar College, graduating in 1930 with degrees in English, Italian, and French. In 1933, as a graduate student at Columbia University, Bentley won a fellowship to the University of Florence. While in Italy, she briefly joined the Gruppo Universitario Fascista, a local fascist student organization, in Italy. She was influenced by Mario Casella, her anti-fascist faculty advisor with whom she had an affair at Columbia.

During work for her master's degree, Bentley attended meetings of the American League Against War and Fascism. Although she would later say that she found Communist literature unreadable and "dry as dust", she was attracted to the sense of community and social conscience she found among her friends in the league. After Bentley learned that most were members of the Communist Party USA (CPUSA), she joined the party in March 1935.

== Espionage activity ==
Bentley became active in espionage in 1935, when she obtained a job at the Italian Library of Information in New York City; the library was Fascist Italy's propaganda bureau in the United States. She reported her employment to CPUSA headquarters, informing them about her willingness to spy on the fascists. Juliet Stuart Poyntz, who also worked at the library, approached and recruited Bentley. The Communists were interested in the information Bentley could provide, so NKVD officer Jacob Golos was assigned as her contact and controller in 1938.

Golos (born Yakov Naumovich Reizen), an immigrant from Russia who became a naturalized United States citizen in 1915, was one of the Soviet Union's most important intelligence agents in the United States. When they met, Golos was involved in planning the assassination of Leon Trotsky (which would take place in Mexico City in 1940). Bentley and Golos soon became lovers and, at this point, she thought she was spying solely for the American Communist Party. It was more than a year before she learned his true name and, according to her later testimony, two years before she knew that he was working for Soviet intelligence.

In 1940, two years into their relationship, the Justice Department forced Golos to register as an agent of the Soviet government under the Foreign Agents Registration Act. This increased the risk of contacting and accepting documents from his network of American spies, and he gradually transferred this responsibility to Bentley. Golos needed someone to take charge of the day-to-day business of the United States Service and Shipping Corporation, a Comintern front organization for espionage activities; Bentley took on this role as well. Although she was never directly paid for her espionage work, she would eventually earn $800 a month as vice president of U.S. Service and Shipping (a considerable monthly salary at the time, equivalent to $18,385 in 2025). As Bentley acquired an important role in Soviet intelligence, the Soviets gave her the code name "Umnitsa", loosely translated as "wise girl" or "clever girl".

=== Silvermaster group ===
Most of Bentley's contacts were in what prosecutors and historians would later call the "Silvermaster group", a network of spies centered around Nathan Gregory Silvermaster. This network became one of the most important Soviet espionage operations in the United States. Silvermaster worked with the Resettlement Administration and, later, with the Board of Economic Warfare. Although he did not have access to much sensitive information, he knew several Communists and Communist sympathizers in the government who were better placed and willing to pass information to him; using Bentley, he sent it to Moscow. The Soviet Union and the United States were allies in World War II, and much of the information Silvermaster collected for the Soviets concerned the war against Nazi Germany; the Soviets were bearing the burden of the ground war in Europe, and were interested in American intelligence. This intelligence included secret estimates of German military strength, data on U.S. munitions production, and information on the Allies' schedule for opening a second front in Europe. The contacts in Golos's and Bentley's extended network ranged from dedicated Stalinists to, in the words of Bentley biographer Kathryn Olmsted, "romantic idealists" who "wanted to help the brave Russians beat the Nazi war machine".

=== Conflicts with Soviet spymasters ===
In late 1943, Golos had a fatal heart attack. After meeting with CPUSA General Secretary Earl Browder, Bentley decided to continue her espionage work and took Golos' place. Her new contact in Soviet intelligence was Iskhak Akhmerov, the leading NKGB resident spy (a spy chief without diplomatic cover). Under orders from Moscow, Akhmerov wanted Bentley to report her contacts directly to him. Bentley, Browder, and Golos had resisted this change, believing that using an American intermediary was the best way to handle their sources and fearing that Russian agents would endanger the American spies and possibly drive them away. With Browder's support, Bentley initially ignored a series of orders that she "hand over" her agents to Akhmerov. She expanded her spy network when Browder gave her control of another group of agents: the Perlo group, with contacts in the War Production Board, the United States Senate, and the Treasury Department.

Since her days in Florence, Bentley had experienced bouts of depression and alcohol abuse. Despondent and lonely after the death of Golos and under increasing pressure from Soviet intelligence, she began to drink more heavily. Bentley missed work at U.S. Service and Shipping, and neighbors described her as drinking "all the time".

In early June 1944, Browder acceded to Akhmerov's demands and agreed to instruct the members of the Silvermaster group to report directly to the NKGB. Bentley later said that this was what turned her against Communism in the United States. She testified to a grand jury in 1948: "I discovered then that Earl Browder was just a puppet, that somebody pulled the strings in Moscow". Bentley's biographers suggest that her objections were not ideological, but were related more to a lifelong dislike of being given orders and a sense that the reassignments of her contacts left her with no meaningful role. She was ordered to give up all of her remaining sources (including the Perlo group) later in 1944, and her Soviet superior told her that she would have to leave her position as vice president of U.S. Service and Shipping.

=== Break with the Soviets ===
In 1945, Bentley began an affair with a man who she came to suspect was an FBI or Soviet agent sent to spy on her. Her Soviet contact suggested that she should emigrate to the Soviet Union, but Bentley feared that she might be executed there. In August 1945, Bentley went to the FBI office in New Haven, Connecticut, and met with the agent-in-charge. She did not immediately defect; she seemed to be "feeling out" the FBI, and did not begin to tell her full story to the agency until November. Bentley's personal situation continued to worsen; she arrived drunk at a September meeting with Anatoly Gorsky, her NKGB controller. She became angry with Gorsky, called him and his fellow Russian agents "gangsters", and obliquely threatened to become an FBI informant. Bentley soon realized that her tirade might have put her life in danger. Gorsky, when reporting the meeting to Moscow, said he should "get rid of her".

Moscow advised Gorsky to be patient with Bentley and calm her down. A few weeks later, it was learned that Louis Budenz (editor of the CPUSA newspaper and one of Bentley's sources) had become an anti-communist. Budenz had not yet revealed his knowledge of espionage activity, but he knew Elizabeth Bentley's name and knew she was a spy. Imperiled from multiple directions, Bentley decided to defect and returned to the FBI on November 7, 1945.

== Defection and aftermath ==
In a series of debriefing interviews with the FBI beginning November 7, 1945, Bentley implicated nearly 150 people (including 37 federal employees) as Soviet spies. The FBI already suspected many of those she named, and some had been named by earlier defectors Igor Gouzenko and Whittaker Chambers, which increased FBI confidence in her information. They gave her the code name "Gregory", and J. Edgar Hoover ordered the strictest secrecy of her identity and defection.

Hoover advised British Security Coordination Western Hemisphere head William Stephenson of Bentley's defection, and Stephenson notified London. However, the British Secret Intelligence Service's new Section IX (counter-espionage against the Soviet Union) head Kim Philby was a Soviet double agent who would escape to the Soviet Union in 1963. Philby alerted Moscow about Bentley, and it discontinued contact with her network as the FBI was beginning its surveillance. Bentley's NKGB contact, Gorsky, again recommended to Moscow that she be "liquidated"; the suggestion was again rejected.

Philby's breach of the secrecy surrounding Bentley's defection foiled a year-long attempt by the FBI to employ her as a double agent. Additionally, because of the shutdown of Soviet espionage activity, FBI surveillance of the agents Bentley had named turned up no evidence which could be used to prosecute them. About 250 FBI agents were assigned to the Bentley case, following up leads she had provided and (with phone taps, surveillance and mail interception) investigating people she had named. The FBI, grand juries, and congressional committees would eventually interview many of these alleged spies, who invoked their Fifth Amendment right not to testify or maintained their innocence.

For Hoover and a few highly-placed FBI and army intelligence personnel, the corroboration of Bentley was the late-1940s-to-early-1950s Venona project decryption of wartime cables between Soviet intelligence agents and Moscow. Bentley was referred to in the cables by the codename she had given the FBI, and several of her known contacts and documents she was known to have passed to the Soviets were discussed.

The classified Venona project was considered so secret that the U.S. government was unwilling to expose it by allowing its material to be used as evidence in a trial. Neither Presidents Franklin D. Roosevelt or Harry Truman were aware of the project by name, although the presidents received some of its conclusions as summaries by J. Edgar Hoover in weekly intelligence reports.

=== Public testimony ===
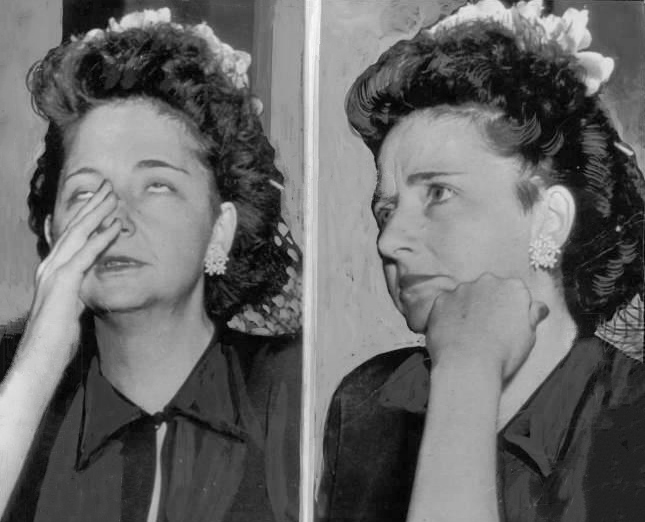
Press photos of Bentley during her 1948 testimony

With chances of successful prosecution looking unlikely, Hoover gave the names of some of Bentley's contacts to members of Congress with the understanding that the accused spies would be questioned by Congressional committees. He believed that the public suspicion and accusations would be enough to ruin their careers. Attorney General Tom C. Clark presented the Bentley case to a grand jury, although he had little hope of any indictments. Bentley testified before this grand jury several times before April 1948, and details of her case began to leak to the press.

Bentley decided to reveal her full story herself to retain more control, and met with New York World-Telegram journalists Nelson Frank and Norton Mockridge. On four consecutive days, the newspaper published a series of front-page stories about the unnamed "beautiful young blonde" who had exposed a ring of spies: "Red Ring Bared by Blond Queen" (July 21, 1948); "Super-Secrecy Veiled Russia's Spy Cells Here" (July 22, 1948); "Citizens Tricked into Spy Ring by U.S. Reds" (July 23, 1948), and "Commie Chieftains Ordered Budenz to Aid Red Spy Queen" (July 26, 1948). Bentley was subpoenaed to testify at a public hearing of the House Un-American Activities Committee (HUAC) on July 31, 1948, a few days after the World-Telegram articles were published.

According to Olmsted's biography, reporters' accounts and analyses of Bentley's testimony varied with their politics. The strongly anti-communist New York Journal-American described Bentley as a "shapely" "blonde and blue-eyed New Yorker" who "lured" secrets from her sources, but A. J. Liebling of The New Yorker ridiculed her story and called her the "Nutmeg Mata Hari". Bentley portrayed herself as naïve and innocent, corrupted by her liberal professors at Vassar and seduced into espionage by Golos.

On August 3, 1948, during additional HUAC hearings, Bentley began to receive some corroboration from Chambers. Under subpoena by HUAC, he testified that he knew at least two of Bentley's contacts (Victor Perlo and Charles Kramer) as communists and members of his earlier Ware Group. Chambers also supported her accusation that Harry Dexter White, a prominent economist who had worked in the Treasury Department, was a communist sympathizer. Comparing their testimony, Chambers wrote in his memoir: "I knew that I was simply back-stopping Miss Bentley, that hers was the current testimony. The things that I had to tell were ten years old and I had only to let the shadows, dust and cobwebs conspicuously drape them to leave the stand unscathed."

Some reporters and commentators were skeptical of Bentley's claims. Because some of those she accused were prominent figures in two Democratic administrations, Democrats were especially eager to have her discredited; President Truman, at one point, described her testimony a Republican-inspired red herring. Republicans, in turn, accused Truman of covering up communist espionage. Conflicts of this nature, along with fears of Soviet communist power in Europe and the increasingly-publicized HUAC hearings, formed the background of McCarthyism. The witch hunt for communists initiated by Senator Joseph McCarthy (R-Wisconsin) became a central factor in 1950s domestic American politics.

=== Meet the Press ===
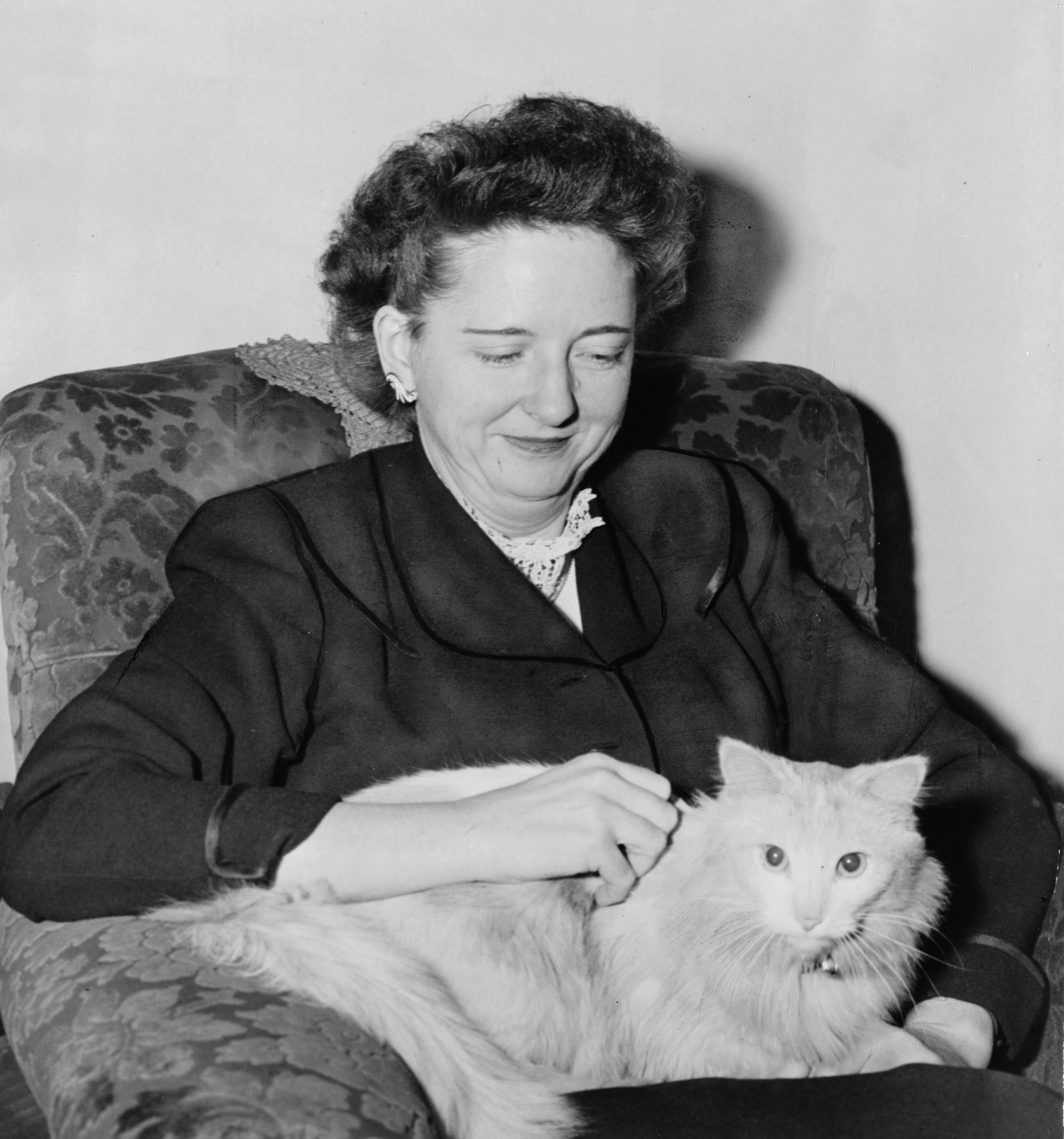
Bentley in 1948

Bentley appeared on NBC Radio's Meet the Press at 10 p.m. on August 6, 1948, on WOR. On September 12, she was the first person interviewed on the first television broadcast of NBC's Meet the Press on WNBT. Journalists on the program included Nelson Frank, Inez Robb, Cecil Brown, and Lawrence Spivak.

Brown asked Bentley three times if she would accuse William Remington of being a communist without congressional protection, and she finally did so. When Remington was called before a Truman loyalty-review board, Joseph L. Rauh Jr. defended him. Remington's attorney, Richard Green, asked Bentley to withdraw the allegation by September 30. When she did not, Green filed a libel suit for $100,000 in damages on October 6, 1948, against Bentley, NBC and Meet the Press sponsor General Foods. Bentley failed to appear in court in October, and Green said on December 29 that he had personally served her with a summons.

=== Trials and credibility ===
Although most of those accused by Bentley invoked the Fifth Amendment and refused to testify, a few denied her allegations. The most notable was Harry Dexter White, who had heart disease and died of a heart attack days after his HUAC testimony. Others who denied Bentley's charges were Lauchlin Currie, formerly President Roosevelt's economic affairs advisor; Remington and William Henry Taylor, mid-level government economists; Duncan Lee, formerly of the Office of Strategic Services (OSS); and Abe Brothman, a private-sector chemist who worked on defense projects. In October 1948, Remington sued Bentley and NBC for libel. Hoping to discredit her, Remington's attorneys hired private detectives to investigate her past. They produced evidence of alcoholism, periods of severe depression, and a suicide attempt as a student in Florence; alleged that her master's thesis had been written by someone else, and she had been sexually promiscuous (by the standards of the day) since college. Bentley did not testify at a Remington loyalty-board hearing, and NBC settled the libel suit out of court for $10,000.

She testified in the trials of four accused spies: Remington's perjury trial, Abe Brothman's obstruction of justice trial, and Julius and Ethel Rosenberg's trials for conspiracy to commit espionage. Bentley, peripherally involved in the Rosenberg case, was used by the prosecution to develop two points: the actions of American communists in becoming spies for the Soviet Union, and establishing (if only vaguely) a connection between Julius Rosenberg and Golos. She testified that she received calls from a man who identified himself as Julius, after which Golos would meet him.

After her contact with U.S. authorities, Bentley's personal life became increasingly tumultuous. She continued to drink heavily, avoided several subpoenas, was involved in car accidents, and had a relationship with a man who severely beat her. These incidents and her generally-erratic behavior resulted in concern by her FBI handlers that she was "bordering on some mental pitfall".

Bentley, described as calm and professional on the witness stand, was praised by prosecutors whose cases she supported. However, she refined and embellished details of her story during repeated appearances before grand juries, congressional committees, and jury trials; information passed to her about a process for manufacturing synthetic rubber which was originally "vague" and "probably of no value" became "super-secret" and "an extremely complicated thing". Bentley said that her espionage gave her advance notice of the Doolittle Raid on Japan and the D-Day invasions of France; both claims were apparently exaggerated.

==== William Remington ====
Remington's first trial began in late December 1950. Roy Cohn, later chief counsel for Senator Joseph McCarthy's Government Operations Subcommittee and already a prominent anti-communist, joined the prosecution's legal team. Bentley supplied details about Remington's involvement with her and the espionage conspiracy; his defense was that he had never handled any classified material, so could not have given any to Bentley. According to Cohn, however,

We had searched through the archives and discovered the files on the process. We also found the aircraft schedules, which were set up exactly as she said, and interoffice memos and tables of personnel which proved Remington had access to both these items. We also discovered Remington's application for a naval commission in which he specifically pointed out that he was, in his present position with the Commerce Department, entrusted with secret military information involving airplanes, armaments, radar, and the Manhattan Project (the atomic bomb).

Eleven witnesses testified at the trial that they knew Remington was a communist, including Bentley; his ex-wife, Ann Remington; Howard Bridgeman of Tufts University; Kenneth McConnell, a communist organizer in Knoxville; Rudolph Bertram and Christine Benson, who worked with him at the Tennessee Valley Authority; and Paul Crouch, who provided him with copies of the southern edition of the Daily Worker.

==== Occupation currency plates ====
Bentley also testified that Harry Dexter White was responsible for passing Treasury plates for printing Allied currency in Allied-occupied Germany to the Soviet Union, which used them to print millions of marks. Russian soldiers exchanged these marks for goods and hard currency. They were catalysts for a black market and inflation throughout the occupied country, costing the U.S. $250 million.

Bentley wrote in her autobiography, Out of Bondage: The Story of Elizabeth Bentley (1951), that she had been "able through Harry Dexter White to arrange that the United States Treasury Department turn the actual printing plates over to the Russians". She elaborated in 1953 to McCarthy's Senate subcommittee, testifying that she was following instructions from NKVD New York rezident Iskhak Abdulovich Akhmerov to pass word through Ludwig Ullmann and Silvermaster for White to "put the pressure on for the delivery of the plates to Russia".

Bentley had not previously mentioned the printing plates in debriefings or testimony, and there was no evidence at the time that she had any role in the transfer of the plates. Bentley biographer Kathryn Olmsted concluded that Bentley was "lying about her role in the scandal", citing historian Bruce Craig's conclusion "that the whole 'scheme' was a complete fabrication"; neither Bentley nor White had a role in the plate transfer.

After Olmsted's 2002 biography was published, a memorandum found in the newly-accessible Soviet archives and also published in 2002 corroborated Bentley's testimony. Gaik Ovakimian (head of the NKVD's American desk) cited an April 14, 1944, report in the memorandum that, "following our instructions" via Silvermaster, White had "attained the positive decision of the Treasury Department to provide the Soviet side with the plates for engraving German occupation marks".

==== Payment (1952) ====
Bentley was asked to testify before a number of bodies investigating communist espionage and influence in the U.S. after her defection, and continued consulting occasionally with the FBI for the rest of her life. She began accepting payments for testimony in 1952, making her a paid FBI informant. According to Kathryn S. Olmsted, Bentley received frequent requests from Catholic and veterans' organizations "happy to pay her $300 fee" for a lecture.

==== Religious conversion and speaking engagements ====
Bentley had been a successful executive with a profitable shipping company while she was with the Communists. After her defection, she supported herself with secretarial work and teaching. In 1948, she was converted to Roman Catholicism by future Auxiliary Bishop of New York Fulton J. Sheen. Bentley was frequently invited by Catholic organizations to lecture on Communism and her experience in the Communist movement.

== Death ==
At age 55, Bentley died after abdominal cancer surgery on December 3, 1963, at Grace-New Haven Hospital in New Haven, Connecticut. Obituaries were published in The New York Times and The Washington Post.

Olmsted observes in her biography the marked contrast between the attention paid to Bentley's death and that of Chambers two years earlier; the National Review devoted a special memorial issue to Chambers' death, but allotted only a paragraph to Bentley, although it is noted that Chambers had worked for the magazine. Time had devoted two pages to its Chambers obituary, but gave Bentley's death a two-sentence mention in its "Milestones" section. (Chambers worked for both magazines.)

== Legacy ==
Although Bentley did not name Chambers in her late-July 1948 testimony, Robert E. Stripling said her testimony had made him "think of Chambers," so he issued a subpoena to Chambers. Chambers appeared to testify a few days after Bentley, thus launching the Hiss case.

Bentley exposed two networks of spies, ultimately naming more than 80 Americans who had engaged in espionage for the Soviets. Her public testimony (which began in July 1948) became a media sensation, and had a major effect on the 1950s prosecution of cases of Soviet espionage. It also added to American fears of a widespread communist conspiracy within the government, which were fanned by McCarthy.

Bentley provided no documentary evidence to support her claims, and reporters and historians were divided for decades about the validity of her allegations. During the 1990s, declassification of Soviet documents and the U.S. codebreaking Venona project lent some credence to her claims.

== See also ==
- Devin-Adair Publishing Company
