= Bransten =

Bransten is a surname. Notable people with the surname include:

- Eileen Bransten (1942–2022), American judge
- Louise Bransten Berman (1908–1977), American communist and suspected Soviet spy
- Richard Bransten (1906–1955), American novelist
