= Zubilin =

Zubilin may refer to:

- Elizabeth Zubilin, pseudonym of Soviet spy Elizabeth Zarubina (1900–1987)
- Vasily Zubilin, pseudonym of Soviet spy Vasily Zarubin (1894–1972), husband of Elizabeth
