= Louise Bransten Berman =

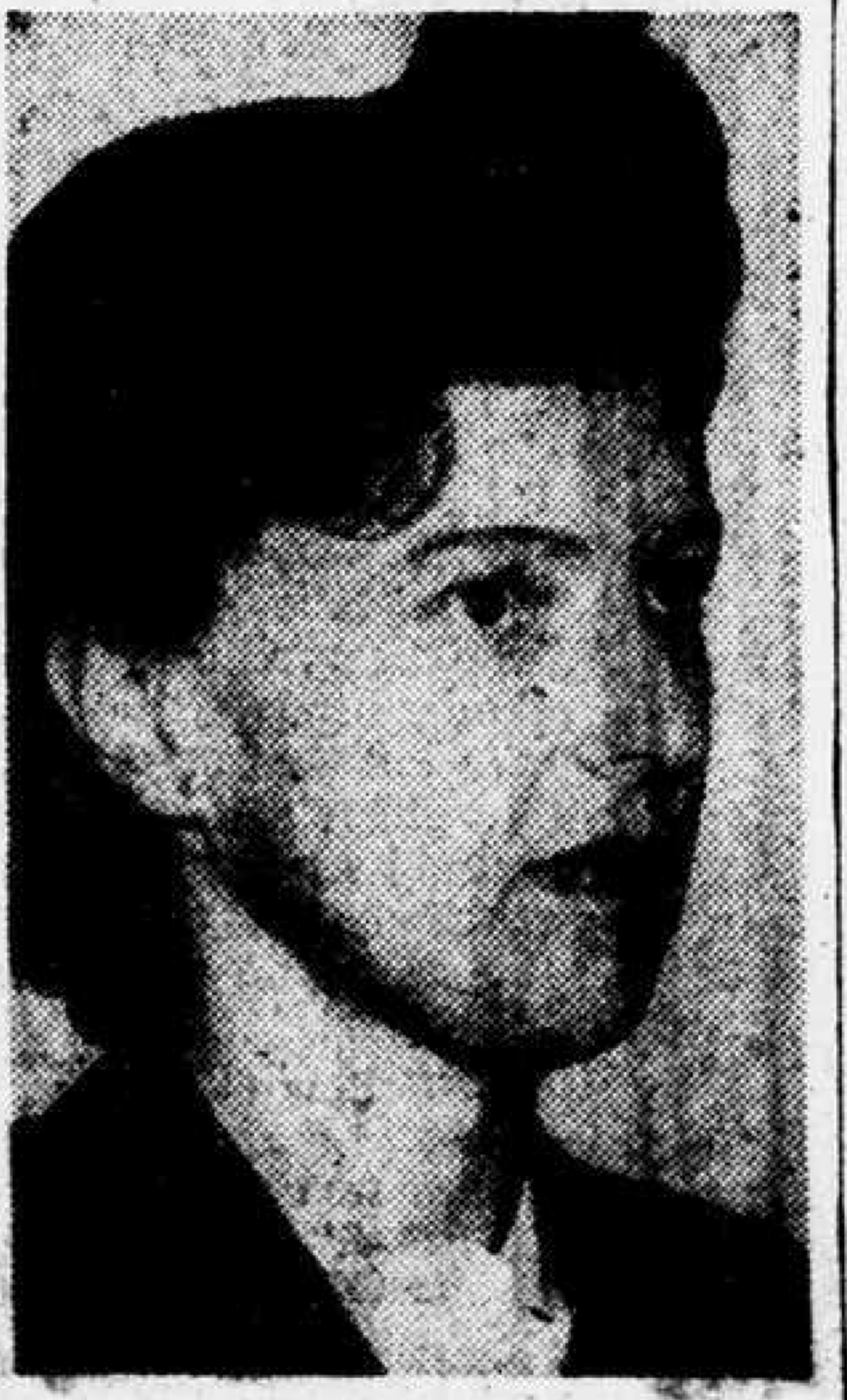
Louise Bransten Berman in 1949

Louise Bransten Berman (October 9, 1908 – August 1977) was a member of the Communist Party and a suspected Soviet spy.

== Biography ==
Louise Rosenberg was born in Berkeley, the daughter of Abraham Rosenberg and Alice Greenbaum. She inherited a fortune from her family's dried fruit importing business, which operated in sixty-five countries. The family's business had previously been sold to a grocery chain for twenty million dollars. She served on the board of The Rosenberg Foundation, a charity established by her family in 1937.

In 1929 she married Richard Bransten, heir to the MJB Coffee fortune. Their son Thomas was born in 1931 and later became a journalist for Ramparts and Fortune. She became the lover of Soviet vice-consul Grigory Markovich Kheifets. J. Robert Oppenheimer met Kheifetz at a cocktail party hosted by Bransten. Kheifets attempted to recruit Oppenheimer for Soviet espionage using Bransten's social connections with George Eltenton. Her other friends involved in Communist Party activities included Nathan Silvermaster and Isaac Folkoff.

In 1942, Bransten arranged a "Salute to Our Russian Ally" event at the San Francisco Opera House that was shut down by the mayor after protests by the American Legion. Bransten worked with Bartley Crum to reverse the mayor's decision, later writing that the controversy showed "how strong the Fascist elements here are"

She was the subject of intense surveillance by the FBI which described her pro-Communist activities as ranging from "mere membership in the Communist Party...to military and industrial espionage and political and propaganda activities". Bransten was referred to in the Venona files by the code name "Map" and described as "a secret member of the CPUSA, a millionaire's daughter, doesn't work anywhere".

Her second husband was Communist Party activist Lionel Berman (1906-1968). He was in charge of the Cultural Section of the Communist Party. Louise Berman and her husband were close friends of Vito Marcantonio, and she was a financial supporter of his campaigns with the American Labor Party.

In 1948 she was questioned in front of the House Un-American Activities Committee about her links to Soviet espionage but refused to answer any questions on the grounds of the Fifth Amendment. She testified again in front of the Committee in 1949 and stated that she had "never engaged in any espionage activity". She defended her financial backing of left-wing causes to the press, stating "if I had $50,000,000 to offer for the perpetuation of racial segregation, some members of this committee might regard me quite favorably". Due to her refusal to cooperate with the Committee, she was held in contempt of Congress. She was acquitted of this charge in 1951. She continued to be involved in politics through the 1960s, helping to raise funds for the Delano Grape strikers in 1963.

Berman's papers are held at the University of Wisconsin-Madison.
