= James Walter Miller =

Alleged Soviet spy in the US

James Walter Miller (1890–1950) was an American citizen and an alleged asset of the San Francisco Office of the KGB from 1943 to 1945. Miller worked in the United States Government wartime mail censorship office. Miller was allegedly recruited into espionage for the Soviet Union by Isaac Folkoff of the Communist Party of the United States of America (CPUSA). His cover name was "Vague".

Born Milawski in Russia, he changed his name to Miller after coming to the United States in 1907. He became a member of the Communist Party in Los Angeles. Miller was associated with Victor Milo while in the California Communist Party. Miller at one time worked for Russky Golos (Russian Voice), the American-Russian Institute, and People's World.

Miller was one of Folkoff's most valuable agents. Miller spoke Russian, and was a Russian-language translator with the financial and trade section of the U.S. government wartime mail censorship office. Miller worked in an area of considerable interest to Soviet intelligence. In 1943 Folkoff passed on to the KGB material from Miller on several occasions. San Francisco Rezident Grigory Kheifets attested to Miller's bone fides in a Venona decrypt, putting to rest reservations from Moscow that because of Miller's eagerness, he may be a double agent.

Miller began passing information to Harrison George at the People's World. In 1943 Miller reported the Mail Censor's office found secret writing in a letter that a Naval GRU Officer sent to Moscow. In 1944 Miller came to the attention of the FBI in the "Comintern Apparatus" investigation. The FBI witnessed Miller meeting Kheifets at least six times in early 1944. Miller was eventually forced out of the government office. He died in 1950.

== Venona ==
James Walter Miller is referenced in the following Venona project decryptions:

- 450 KGB San Francisco to Moscow, 1 November 1943
- 472 KGB San Francisco to Moscow, 9 November 1943
- 511 KGB San Francisco to Moscow, 7 December 1943
- 539 KGB San Francisco to Moscow, 31 December 1943
- 147 San Francisco to Moscow, 27 March 1944
- 68 KGB San Francisco to Moscow, 27 February 1945
