= MLB (disambiguation) =

MLB usually refers to Major League Baseball, the highest level of professional baseball in North America.

MLB may also refer to:

== Sports ==
- Minor League Baseball, more commonly abbreviated MiLB, a hierarchy of professional baseball leagues affiliated with Major League Baseball
- Middle linebacker, a position in American and Canadian football

== Video games ==
- MLB (video game series), by 989 Sports
- Mario & Luigi: Brothership, an RPG game

== Transportation ==
- Motor life boat
- Volkswagen Group MLB platform, for modular vehicle manufacture
- Melbourne Orlando International Airport, Florida, US, IATA code
- Maritime Labor Board, a US government agency that existed from 1938 to 1942

== Other uses ==
- Morgan, Lewis & Bockius, an American multinational law firm
- Master of Law and Business, a degree awarded by Bucerius Law School
- Miłosz Biedrzycki, Polish poet

== See also ==
- MLB.com, a domain name owned by Morgan, Lewis & Bockius, then transferred to Major League Baseball
