= Nancy Gordon =

American economist and statistician

- Citizenship: American
- Education: University of California, Berkeley; Stanford University.
- Scientific career
- Workplaces: United States Census Bureau
- Thesis: Ex ante and Ex post Substitutability in Economic Growth
- Doctoral advisor: Kenneth Arrow

Nancy May Gordon is an American economist and statistician who works for the United States Census Bureau.

== Education and career ==
Gordon majored in economics and statistics at the University of California, Berkeley, and earned a doctorate in economics from Stanford University. Her dissertation, Ex ante and Ex post Substitutability in Economic Growth, was supervised by Kenneth Arrow.

After completing her Ph.D., she became a faculty member at Carnegie Mellon University from 1970 to 1974, and then a senior research associate at the Urban Institute.

In 1979, Gordon was an appointee in the Carter Administration as a senior advisor and executive director of the Presidential Task Force on Women. From 1980 to 1995 she worked in the Congressional Budget Office as a senior economist and assistant director for health and human resources.

Since 1995 she has worked at the United States Census Bureau. From 1995 until 2005 she worked on household surveys as associate director for demographic programs. she was the associate director for demographic programs. Subsequently, she became associate director for strategic planning and innovation at the Census Bureau prior to her retirement.

== Service ==
Gordon was president of the Caucus for Women in Statistics in 1985, and chair of the Committee on the Status of Women in the Economics Profession of the American Economic Association from 1985 to 1987. She has also served on the board of directors of Worldwide Assurance for Employees of Public Agencies, a nonprofit insurance association for federal employees, from 1982 to 1990, including a term as president of the board.

== Recognition ==
In September 2000, Gordon was elected as a Fellow of the American Statistical Association. She is also an elected member of the International Statistical Institute.
