= William Ludwig Ullmann =

American Treasury Department official accused of spying

- Born: August 14, 1908; Springfield, Missouri, U.S.
- Died: February 3, 1993 (aged 84); Beach Haven, New Jersey, U.S.
- Known for: Silvermaster spy ring
- Relatives: Frances Ullmann DeArmand (sister)

William Ludwig Ullmann (August 14, 1908 – February 3, 1993) was an American Treasury Department official accused of spying for the Soviet Union.

== Biography ==
He was born in Springfield, Missouri, on August 14, 1908. He attended Drury College (now Drury University), and graduated from Harvard Business School with an MBA in 1935. Ulmann then took a job with the National Recovery Administration. There he met Greg and Helen Silvermaster. The three jointly bought a house in 1938. In 1937 Ullman transferred to the Resettlement Administration (which became the Farm Security Administration). In 1939 Ulmann was recommended by his superior C. B. Baldwin to Harry Dexter White and was hired at the Division of Monetary Research in the United States Department of the Treasury. His immediate supervisor in his new post was Frank Coe. By 1941 Ullmann had become White's administrative assistant.

Ullmann worked in the Treasury until he was drafted into World War II 1942. He then obtained a commission in the Army Air Force and through George Silverman was assigned to the Pentagon. He was "chief photographer of stolen government documents for the Silvermaster espionage ring" while a Major in the Material and Services Division of the Army Air Corps. Among the information Ullmann supplied to Soviet intelligence were: aircraft production figures, allocation and deployment of aircraft, results of aircraft testing, reports on the efficiency of particular types of planes, technological developments in aircraft manufacture, statistics regarding high octane gasoline, personal data regarding important Air Force officers, opinions of aircraft personnel on other nations, Army gossip, all pertinent developments concerning planning, construction and actual completion of the B-29 Superfortress, proposed movements of the planes when they were completed, the approximate schedule of D Day, copies of directives issued to General George Marshall, and information concerning production, allocation and development of tanks, guns and motorized equipment. He provided the Soviets with a considerable volume of almost every conceivable type of information relating to the United States Army Air Force's part in World War II.

In the basement of the Silvermaster and Ullmann home, Ullmann maintained a photographic darkroom for copying and processing stolen documents and reducing them to microfilm. The volume of information eventually became so overwhelming that only negatives were completed because Ullman could not process the stolen documents fast enough. The information was then passed on through Elizabeth Bentley.

Kathryn S. Olmsted, the author of Red Spy Queen (2002), points out: "Every two weeks, Elizabeth would travel to Washington to pick up documents from the Silvermasters, collect their Party dues, and deliver Communist literature. Soon the flow of documents grew so large that Ullmann, an amateur photographer, set up a darkroom in their basement. Elizabeth usually collected at least two or three rolls of microfilmed secret documents, and one time received as many as forty. She would stuff all the film and documents into a knitting bag or other innocent feminine accessory, then take it back to New York on the train." Moscow complained that around half of the photographed documents received in the summer of 1944 were unreadable and suggested that Ullmann should receive more training. However, Pavel Fitin, who was responsible for analyzing the material, described it as very important data.

After his discharge in 1943, he returned to the Treasury Department. Ullmann was a United States delegate to the United Nations Charter meeting at San Francisco and to the Bretton Woods Conference as Harry Dexter White's assistant.

Ullmann was never prosecuted. He later became a real estate developer in New Jersey and died on February 3, 1993, in Beach Haven, New Jersey, with an $8 million estate.
