= Anatole Boris Volkov =

- Born: October 29, 1924; San Francisco, California, U.S.
- Died: November 28, 2000 (aged 76); Lakeland, Florida, U.S.
- Education: University of North Carolina at Chapel Hill (1948); University of Wisconsin–Madison, M.Sc., Ph.D. (1950)
- Occupation: physicist
- Employer: McMaster University (1964–1989)
- Known for: Silvermaster spy ring
- Parent: Elena Witte
- Relatives: Nathan Gregory Silvermaster, stepfather Sergei Witte, great granduncle

Anatole Boris Volkov (October 29, 1924 – November 28, 2000) was an American physicist, allegedly serving as a courier for the Silvermaster spy ring between Washington, D.C., and New York City. Volkov taught both abroad and in America, retiring in the United States 1989. Though Volkov's name appears in the FBI's files, he was never convicted of any espionage by the U.S. government.

== Ancestry ==
He was related to Count Sergei Witte, who was Czar Nicholas II's Finance Minister of Russia from 1892 to 1903. His mother, Elena Witte, was a baroness. In 1923 the Wittes emigrated to San Francisco, California. (There is no known link between Volkov and "Pop Folkoff" or Volkov or Isaac Folkoff, another communist based in San Francisco.)

== Birth and education ==
Volkov was born on October 29, 1924, in San Francisco, California. After her divorce, his mother married Nathan Gregory Silvermaster, head of the Silvermaster group who spied for the Soviet Union during World War II. Volkov spent two years as a radar operator in the United States Navy in the Pacific.

Volkov earned a B.S. in science from the University of North Carolina at Chapel Hill in 1948 and M.Sc/Ph.D degrees from the University of Wisconsin–Madison in 1953. His Ph.D. thesis, titled Magnetic interactions on the basis of a modified shell model of complex nuclei, was written under the direction of Robert G. Sachs. Afterwards, he moved to Israel and did research at the Technion in Haifa, and at the Weizmann Institute of Science in Rehovot. From there he moved to Copenhagen in 1963 and worked at the Niels Bohr Institute. In 1964 he moved to Canada and taught at McMaster University until his retirement in 1989.

== Death ==
He died of cancer on November 28, 2000, aged 76, in Lakeland, Florida.
