= Richard Bransten =

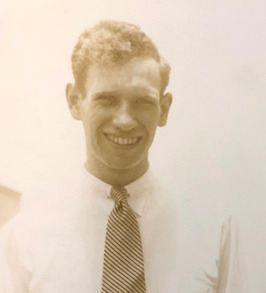
Bransten in 1929

Richard Bransten (February 24, 1906 – November 18, 1955), pen and party name "Bruce Minton," was an American novelist, screenwriter, and Communist Party member.

== Family and background ==
Richard Bransten was born in San Francisco in 1906. He was born into a wealthy family that had made its fortune in the coffee business. His grandfather was Joseph Brandenstein and his father Charles had been one of the founders of MJB Coffee. In 1929, Bransten married his first wife Louise Rosenberg, San Francisco heiress to a dried fruit fortune. As Louise Bransten, she was a close contact of Nathan Silvermaster and Grigory Kheifets and herself accused of being a Soviet spy.

== Political and literary career ==
Bransten began his career as a novelist and short story writer. His wife described his stories as “full of bitterness against the hypocritical rich Jewish society in which he had been brought up.” His first political work, The Fascist Menace in the USA, was published in 1934.

In 1937, Bransten married Ruth McKenney, author of My Sister Eileen. Under the pen name Bruce Minton, Bransten published The Fat Years and the Lean in 1940, a book describing the labor movement from 1918 to 1939. As a result of his political writings, the FBI opened a file on Bransten in April 1941.

During World War II, Bransten assisted Jacob Golos and Silvermaster in passing information from Washington to KGB sources in New York. Silvermaster testified in 1944 that Bransten had been “one of his closest social friends”.

Bransten moved to Hollywood for a short period between 1944 and 1945, where he worked as a screenwriter on the films Margie, San Diego I Love You, and The Trouble with Women. Bransten and McKenney were expelled from the Communist Party in 1946 and accused of “conducting a factional struggle against the party line” according to the New York Times. Their expulsion resulted from the Branstens' opposition to the 1946 expulsion of Earl Browder from the Communist Party.

Following their break with the Party, Bransten and McKenney moved to Europe and lived in Brussels and London. Bransten published the humorous British travel guide Here's England: A Highly Informal Guide.

Disillusioned with the Communist Party, Bransten may have informed on his former friends in the Party, though this is not certain.

Richard Branstein committed suicide on November 18, 1955, with a drug overdose.

== Legacy ==
Bransten was the model for the character Stephen Howard in Christina Stead’s novel I'm Dying Laughing. Stead had been a fellow Communist Party member and friends with Bransten and McKenney.
