= Vasily Zarubin =

Soviet intelligence officer

Vasily Mikhailovich Zarubin (Russian: Васи́лий Михáйлович Зарýбин) (4 February 1894 – 18 September 1972) was a Soviet intelligence officer. In the United States, he used the cover name Vasily Zubilin and served as the chief Soviet intelligence Rezident from 1941 to 1944. Zarubin's wife, Elizaveta, served with him.

== Life ==
Zarubin was born in Panino, in the Bronnitsky Uyezd of the Moscow Governorate of the Russian Empire. He served with the Russian Imperial Army on the Eastern Front during World War I from 1914. For agitation against the war Zarubin served in a penal battalion. Zarubin was wounded in March 1917. He served in the Red Army and fought in the Russian Civil War from 1918 to 1920.

He joined the Cheka in 1920 and served in its internal security section. In 1923, he was appointed as the chief of economic division OGPU in Vladivostok and organized the fight with the smuggling of narcotics and weapons from Europe to China. In 1925, he transferred to foreign intelligence. In 23 years of service, 13 years were on the Illegal work in different countries.

He served as a legal officer in China (1925), a legal officer in Finland (1926), (clandestine) resident spy in Denmark and Germany (1927–1929) posing as a Czechoslovak citizen Jaroslav Koček and his wife Liza, born Rosenzweig as Mariana Koček, a resident spy in France (1929–1933), and a resident spy in Germany (1933–1937) after Adolf Hitler came to power. In 1937, Zarubin returned to the USSR for work with the KGB's central apparatus and was awarded the Order of the Red Banner for his work in creating the underground antifascist groups.

From 1939 to 1940, he was one of NKVD's officers in Kozelsk camp for Polish prisoners of war. In Kozelsk his task was to investigate the Polish POWs in the camp. After most of the POWs were massacred in the Katyn Forest, he was reassigned to other duties.

In 1940, he survived an accusation of working for the Gestapo.

In the spring of 1941, he undertook an assignment in China. He is credited with obtaining information from Walter Stennes, a high-ranking German adviser to Chiang Kai-shek about Hitler's plans to attack the USSR in mid-1941.

Zarubin became the chief of the KGB legal Rezidentura in the United States in the fall of 1941. On 12 October 1941, just as the Germans were on the outskirts of Moscow, Zarubin was personally directed by Joseph Stalin to his primary task: to discover if the United States would attempt to arrange for a separate peace with Germany.

Zarubin was unpopular with the other agents in New York City. It was believed that he showed too much faith in Elizabeth Zarubina and other officers he had brought with him to the United States. One of his officers, Vassili Dorogov reported back to Moscow that he disapproved of his "crudeness, general lack of manners, use of street language and obscenities, carelessness in his work, and repugnant secretiveness."

Zarubin came to the attention of the FBI when in April 1943, he attempted to meet Steve Nelson, a member of the Communist Party of the United States in California. "Zarubin travelled to California for a secret meeting with Steve Nelson, who ran a secret control commission to seek out informants and spies in the Californian branch of the Communist Party, but failed to find Nelson's home. Only on a second visit did he succeed in delivering the money. On this occasion, however, the meeting was bugged by the FBI which had placed listening devices in Nelson's home." The FBI bug confirmed that Zarubin had "paid a sum of money" to Nelson "for the purpose of placing Communist Party members and Comintern agents in industries engaged in secret war production for the United States Government so that the information could be obtained for transmittal to the Soviet Union."

Zarubin actively participated in recruiting work. The Rezidency obtained political information from the United States Government, and the scientific-technical information that was highly valuable to Moscow and regularly reported to Stalin. The Rezidentura under Zarubin achieved large results and made the weighty contribution to strengthening of the economic and military power of the Soviet Union. Zarubin was recalled in 1944 to face a second accusation of working for the Germans, which he survived.

For the results achieved during September 1944 Zarubin received the title of the Commissioner of State Security, and by the decision of the Council of People's Commissars of the USSR on 9 July 1945 became a Major General.

After returning to the USSR, Zarubin became deputy chief of foreign intelligence and simultaneously deputy chief of illegal foreign intelligence. He worked in this capacity up to 1948 when he was discharged due to health status.

Zarubin was awarded the Order of Lenin twice, the Order of the Red Banner twice, and the Red Star, with many other medals.

== Markov ==
One of the documents in the Venona project collection is an anonymous letter, dated 7 August 1943, to "Mr. Guver" (Hoover). It identifies Soviet "intelligence officers and operations that stretched from Canada to Mexico." It also includes accusations of war crimes against the KGB Rezident in Washington, D.C., Vassili M. Zarubin (a.k.a. Zubilin), and his deputy, Markov (in the United States under the alias of Lt. Col. Vassili D. Mironov).

The anonymous author asserted that Zarubin and his deputy Markov were directly implicated in the bloody occupation of eastern Poland during the Nazi-Soviet alliance of 1939-1941 and the murder of some 15,000 Polish soldiers—officers and NCOs, regulars and reservists—captured by the Red Army. The letter provided accurate and early confirmation of Soviet complicity in the executions in the Katyn Forest, where German occupation forces in April 1943 discovered a mass grave containing 4,300 Polish corpses and widely publicised the discovery and accused the Soviet Union of the massacre.

Semyon Semenov in New York City and Grigory Kheifets in San Francisco were also identified in the letter. Regarding Semenov, the letter said, "SEMENOV works in AMTORG, is robbing the whole of the war industry in America. SEMENOV has his agents in all the industrial towns of the U.S.A., in all aviation and chemical war factories and in big industries. He works very brazenly and roughly, it would be very easy to follow him up and catch him red handed." Pavel Sudoplatov, head of the NKVD's Administration for Special Tasks wrote in 1992 that the author of this letter is Markov.

The letter caused Zarubin to be recalled to Moscow. An investigation of him and Elizabeth Zarubina lasted six months and established that he was not working with the FBI. Markov was recalled from Washington and arrested on charges of slander, but when he was put on trial, it was discovered that he was schizophrenic. He was hospitalized and discharged from the service.
