= Helen Silvermaster =

Accused Soviet spy

Helen P. Silvermaster
- Born: Elena Witte; July 19, 1899; Russian Empire
- Died: December 22, 1991 (aged 92); Beach Haven, New Jersey, U.S.
- Known for: Silvermaster spy ring
- Spouse(s): Volkov (divorced; one child); Nathan Gregory Silvermaster (1930-1964; his death)
- Children: Anatole Boris Volkov
- Relatives: Sergei Witte, granduncle

Helen P. Silvermaster (July 19, 1899 — December 22, 1991) was an accused Soviet spy.

== Biography ==
Elena Witte was born in 1899 in the Russian Empire. Her father, Baron Peter Witte, was a counselor to Tsar Nikolai II and acted as an advisor to the Mongolian government. After the October Revolution he was arrested by Bolsheviks, but later released. After her father's arrest, she moved to China and married a Russian, becoming known as Elena Volkov, around 1923.

The couple emigrated to San Francisco, California, in 1924 where their son, Anatole Boris Volkov was born the same year. (There is no known link between Volkov and "Pop Folkoff" or Volkov or Isaac Folkoff, another communist based in San Francisco.) Shortly after their son's birth the couple separated. Helen began a relationship with Nathan Gregory Silvermaster; the couple wed in 1930 and remained married until Nathan's death in 1964.

The couple came to Washington, D.C., in 1939. In Washington, she was one of the leaders of the Washington Bookshop, the American League for Peace and Democracy, the Washington Committee for Aid to China, and the National Federation for Constitutional Liberties. All these organizations were Comintern and CPUSA sponsored organizations. Her code name with Soviet intelligence, identified in Venona decrypts, was "Dora".

At first, Jacob Golos was the main contact of the Silvermaster group but his failing health meant that he used Elizabeth Bentley to collect information from the house. Helen was highly suspicious of Bentley and she told Golos that she was convinced that she was an undercover agent for the FBI. Golos told her that she was being ridiculous and that she had no choice but to work with her. The Silvermasters reluctantly accepted Bentley as their new contact.

Kathryn S. Olmsted, the author of Red Spy Queen (2002), points out: "Every two weeks, Elizabeth would travel to Washington to pick up documents from the Silvermasters, collect their Party dues, and deliver Communist literature. Soon the flow of documents grew so large that Ullmann, an amateur photographer, set up a darkroom in their basement. Elizabeth usually collected at least two or three rolls of microfilmed secret documents, and one time received as many as forty. She would stuff all the film and documents into a knitting bag or other innocent feminine accessory, then take it back to New York on the train." Moscow complained that around half of the photographed documents received in the summer of 1944 were unreadable and suggested that Ullmann received more training. However, Pavel Fitin, who was responsible for analyzing the material, described it as very important data.

== Death ==
She died on December 22, 1991, in Beach Haven, New Jersey, aged 92.
