= Nathan Gregory Silvermaster =

Russian-American spy (1898–1964)

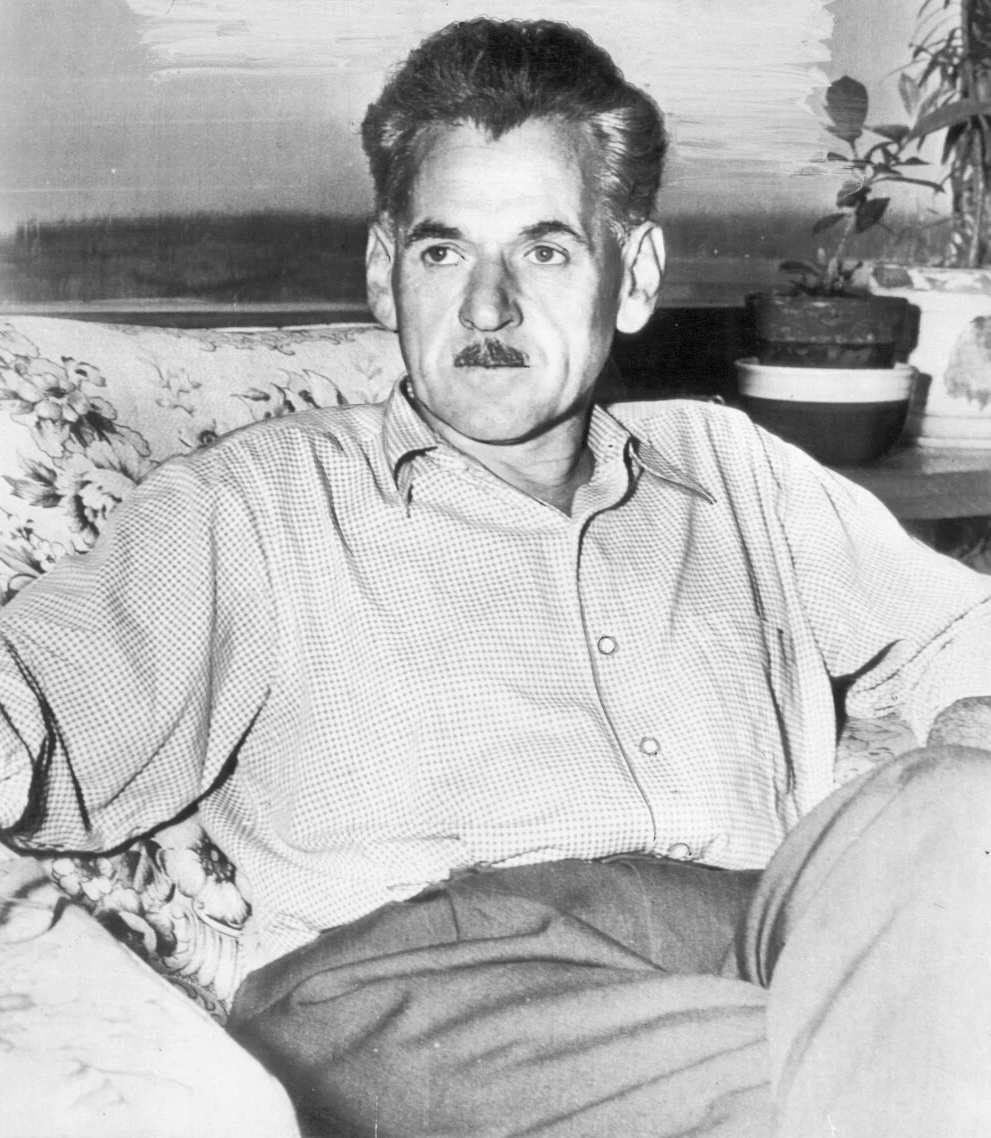
- Silvermaster in 1948
- Born: November 27, 1898; Odessa, Russian Empire
- Died: October 7, 1964 (aged 65); Philadelphia, Pennsylvania, U.S.
- Known for: Silvermaster spy ring
- Spouse: Elena Witte aka Helen P. Silvermaster

Nathan Gregory Silvermaster (November 27, 1898 – October 7, 1964) was an economist with the United States War Production Board (WPB) during World War II, during which time he was also the head of a large ring of Communist spies in the U.S. government. It is from him that the FBI Silvermaster File, documenting the Bureau's investigation into Communist Party USA penetration of the U.S. federal government during the 1930s and 1940s, takes its name. His wife Helen and stepson Anatole Volkov were members of his ring.

Silvermaster was identified as a Soviet agent in the WPB operating under the code names Pel, Pal, and "Paul", in the Venona decrypts; and as "Robert" both in Venona, and independently by defecting Soviet intelligence courier Elizabeth Bentley.

== Background ==
Silvermaster was born to a Jewish family in Odessa, Russia (present-day Odesa, Ukraine) in 1898. He moved with his family to China, where he learned to speak perfect English with a British accent. He emigrated to the United States and earned his B.A. from the University of Washington in Seattle (where he was "stated to be a known Communist") and a Ph.D. from the University of California, Berkeley, where his thesis was entitled Lenin's Economic Thought Prior to the October Revolution. He became a naturalized American citizen in 1926. He was reported to be in contact with a very large number of Communist Party USA officials, and was active in a number of Communist front groups.

== Career ==
=== Civil service ===
From August 1935 to November 1938, Silvermaster worked an economist in the Farm Security Administration. From November 1938 to July 1940, he worked on the Maritime Labor Board. From July 1940 to December 1944, he worked in the Department of Agriculture

While nominally remaining on the employment rolls of the Farm Security Administration, Silvermaster arranged in 1942 to be detailed to the Board of Economic Warfare. The transfer, however, triggered objections from military counter-intelligence who suspected he was a hidden Communist and regarded him as a security risk. On July 16, 1942 the U.S. Civil Service Commission recommended "Cancel eligibilities ... and bar him for the duration of the National Emergency."

Silvermaster denied any Communist links and appealed to Under Secretary of War Robert Patterson to overrule the security officials. Both White House advisor Lauchlin Currie (identified in Venona as the Soviet agent operating under the cover name "Page") and Assistant Secretary of the Treasury Harry Dexter White (identified in Venona as the Soviet agent operating under the cover names "Lawyer"; "Jurist"; "Richard") intervened on his behalf. Silvermaster subsequently received two promotions and pay raises.

From 1942 to 1945, he was also assigned to the United States Treasury. In mid-1945, he joined the Reconstruction Finance Corporation (later War Assets Corporation). In March 1946, he resigned from government.

On August 28, 1950, Lee Pressman (a member of the Ware Group, a precursor to the Silvermaster and Perlo) said of Silvermaster, "I believe he was with the Maritime Labor Board when I was with the CIO, and in that connection I may have had some business dealings with him" (apparently referring to Silvermaster's time with that union 1938–1940).

=== Espionage: Silvermaster Group ===
Kathryn S. Olmsted, the author of Red Spy Queen (2002), points out: "Every two weeks, Elizabeth Bentley would travel to Washington to pick up documents from the Silvermasters, collect their Party dues, and deliver Communist literature. Soon the flow of documents grew so large that Ullmann, an amateur photographer, set up a darkroom in their basement. Elizabeth usually collected at least two or three rolls of microfilmed secret documents, and one time received as many as forty. She would stuff all the film and documents into a knitting bag or other innocent feminine accessory, then take it back to New York on the train." Moscow complained that around half of the photographed documents received in the summer of 1944 were unreadable and suggested that Ullmann receive more training. However, Pavel Fitin, who was responsible for analyzing the material, described it as very important data.

At the War Production Board, Silvermaster was able to provide the Soviet Union with a large amount of data on arms, aircraft, and shipping production. In June 1943, Silvermaster sent a War Production Board report on arms production in the United States, including bombers, pursuit planes, tanks, propelled guns, howitzers, radar and submarines, sub chasers, and the like, to Soviet intelligence. Then, in December 1944, the New York MGB office cabled another Silvermaster report stating: "(Silvermaster) has sent us a 50-page Top Secret War Production Board report ... on arms production in the U.S."

In 1944, Silvermaster was associated with Harry Dexter White at the Bretton Woods conference, and his testimony before the US Senate Internal Security Subcommittee covers "175 pages of interrogation and exhibits" regarding his espionage activities in the U.S.

The Silvermaster spy ring operated primarily in the Department of the Treasury but also had contacts in the Army Air Forces and in the White House. Sixty-one of the Venona cables concern the activities of the Silvermaster spy ring. This represents 1% of the total (approx 6,000 cables) and 3% of the (2,000) translated/partially translated VENONA cables.

- Nathan Gregory Silvermaster, Chief Planning Technician, Procurement Division, United States Department of the Treasury; Chief Economist, War Assets Administration; Director of the Labor Division, Farm Security Administration; Board of Economic Warfare; Reconstruction Finance Corporation Department of Commerce
- Helen Silvermaster, wife
- Anatole Boris Volkov, stepson
- Solomon Adler aka Schlomer Adler, U.S. Department of the Treasury
- Norman Chandler Bursler, United States Department of Justice Anti-Trust Division
- Frank Coe, Assistant Director, Division of Monetary Research, Treasury Department; Special Assistant to the U.S. Ambassador in London; Assistant to the Executive Director, Board of Economic Warfare; Assistant Administrator, Foreign Economic Administration
- Lauchlin Currie, Administrative Assistant to President Roosevelt; Deputy Administrator of Foreign Economic Administration; Special Representative to China
- Bela Gold, Assistant Head of Program Surveys, Bureau of Agricultural Economics, United States Department of Agriculture; Senate Subcommittee on War Mobilization; Office of Economic Programs in Foreign Economic Administration
- Sonia Steinman Gold, Division of Monetary Research U.S. Treasury Department; U.S. House of Representatives Select Committee on Interstate Migration; U.S. Bureau of Employment Security
- Irving Kaplan, Foreign Funds Control and Division of Monetary Research, United States Department of the Treasury Foreign Economic Administration; chief advisor to the Military Government of Germany
- George Silverman, civilian Chief Production Specialist, Material Division, Army Air Force Air Staff, War Department, Pentagon
- William Henry Taylor, Assistant Director of the Middle East Division of Monetary Research, United States Department of Treasury
- William "Lud" Ullman, delegate to United Nations Charter meeting and Bretton Woods conference; Division of Monetary Research, Department of Treasury; Material and Services Division, Air Corps Headquarters, Pentagon
- Harry Dexter White, Assistant Secretary of the Treasury; Head of the International Monetary Fund

== Death ==
He died on October 7, 1964, aged 65, in Philadelphia.

== External sources ==
- Christopher M. Andrew and Vasili Mitrokhin, The Sword and the Shield: The Mitrokhin Archive and the Secret History of the KGB (New York: Basic Books, 1999)
- Chambers, Whittaker (1952). Witness. Random House. ISBN 0-89526-571-0.
- Gregg Herken. Brotherhood of the Bomb. New York: Henry Holt and Company, 2002.
- 746, 747, 748 Venona New York KGB to Moscow, May 25 1942 Data on construction and distribution of U.S. military aircraft.
- 1061, 0162, 1063 Venona New York KGB to Moscow, July 3, 1943, pg. 1 pg. 2 Numerical strength of the United States Army Air Forces.
- Richard C.S. Trahair and Robert Miller, Encyclopedia of Cold War Espionage, Spies, and Secret Operations (New York: Enigma Books, 2008) ISBN 978-1-929631-75-9.
- Hastings, Max (2015). The Secret War: Spies, Codes and Guerrillas 1939 -1945 (Paperback). London: William Collins. ISBN 978-0-00-750374-2.
- The Cold War International History Project (CWIHP) has the full text of former KGB agent Alexander Vassiliev's Notebooks, containing new evidence on Silvermaster's role in Soviet espionage in the United States
- FBI Silvermaster File 65-56402 (26,000+ pages)
- Silvermaster Group FBI FOIA (1,950 pages)
