= Robert G. Sachs =

American theoretical physicist (1916–1999)

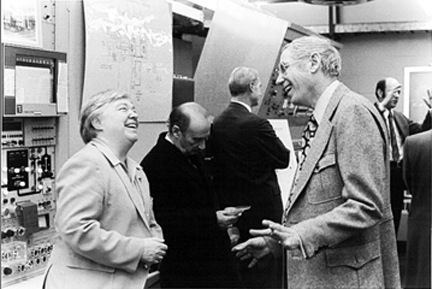
- Robert G. Sachs (right) with Atomic Energy Commission chair Dixy Lee Ray.
- Born: Robert Green Sachs; May 4, 1916; Hagerstown, Maryland, United States
- Died: April 14, 1999 (aged 82); Hyde Park, Chicago
- Education: Johns Hopkins University
- Known for: nuclear physics, terminal ballistics, and nuclear power reactors
- Scientific career
- Fields: Theoretical physics
- Workplaces: Argonne National Laboratory; University of Wisconsin–Madison; University of Chicago
- Thesis: Nuclear spins and magnetic moments by the alpha-particle model (1939)
- Doctoral advisor: Maria Goeppert-Mayer
- Doctoral students: Gene Amdahl; Anatole Boris Volkov; Kameshwar C. Wali
- Other notable students: Frederick J. Ernst

Robert G. Sachs (May 4, 1916 – April 14, 1999) was an American theoretical physicist, a founder and a director of the Argonne National Laboratory. Sachs was also notable for his work in theoretical nuclear physics, terminal ballistics, and nuclear power reactors. Sachs was also a member of the National Academy of Sciences, chairman of the Academy's Physics Section, chairman of the Academy's Class I (Physical and Mathematical Sciences), and director of the Enrico Fermi Institute of the University of Chicago. Sachs was the author of the standard textbook Nuclear Theory (1953).

== Notable honors and awards ==
- Guggenheim fellow
- honorary Ph.D., Purdue University (1967)
- elected a member to the National Academy of Sciences (1971)
- honorary Ph.D., University of Illinois (1977)
- honorary Ph.D., Elmhurst College (1987)

== Life and career ==
- Born in Hagerstown, Maryland
- Ph.D. from Johns Hopkins University in 1939
