= Margie (1946 film) =

1946 film directed by Henry King

- Theatrical release poster
- Directed by: Henry King
- Screenplay by: F. Hugh Herbert
- Story by: Ruth McKenney; Richard Bransten
- Produced by: Walter Morosco
- Starring: Jeanne Crain; Glenn Langan; Lynn Bari; Alan Young; Barbara Lawrence; Conrad Janis; Esther Dale; Hobart Cavanaugh; Ann Todd; Hattie McDaniel
- Cinematography: Charles Clarke, A.S.C.
- Edited by: Barbara McLean
- Music by: Alfred Newman (musical direction)
- Color process: Technicolor
- Production company: Darryl F. Zanuck presents
- Distributed by: Twentieth Century-Fox Film Corporation
- Release date: October 16, 1946
- Running time: 94 minutes
- Country: United States
- Language: English
- Budget: $1,680,000
- Box office: $4.1 million (US/Canada rentals)

Margie is a 1946 American romantic comedy film in Technicolor, directed by Henry King and starring Jeanne Crain, about a high school girl in the 1920s who develops a crush on her French teacher. Margie was a box-office hit, ranking in the top 15 highest-grossing films of the year, and established Crain as an important Fox star. Although not a true movie musical (as it uses period recordings, with only a few songs being partially performed by characters in the film), it is sometimes classified with musicals for the large number of 1920s-era popular songs incorporated as nostalgic background in the film.

The film was the basis for the 1961 television sitcom Margie, featuring Cynthia Pepper.

== Plot ==
In 1946, Margie is a housewife reminiscing about her high school days with her own teenage daughter, who has just discovered her mother's old photo album in the attic. In a flashback to the 1920s, Margie is a high-spirited girl living with her dominant but good-hearted Grandmother McSweeney. Her mother has died and her father, the local mortician, lives apart from Margie and her grandmother, only visiting on Wednesday due to his busy work schedule, and sometimes not even staying long enough to see his daughter. The youngest girl in her class, Margie does very well at her schoolwork, but she is not socially adept and wears old-fashioned clothing, including bloomers that frequently fall down. By contrast, her pretty and fashionable neighbor Marybelle Tenor wears short skirts and lipstick and dates the popular but dimwitted captain of the football team, Johnny Green. Margie secretly has a crush on Johnny, but he regards her as a "pain in the neck". When Margie meets the handsome new French teacher at her high school, Professor Ralph Fontayne, she becomes even more smitten with him, and he seems to take an interest in her as well. Meanwhile, Margie's bumbling classmate Roy Hornsdale is in love with her, and constantly attempts to court her despite her disinterest in him.

Margie participates in a school debate and is excited that both her father and Mr. Fontayne attend. Margie's father is impressed with her debating skills and proud of her. Afterwards, at the skating rink, Margie gets a chance to skate with Johnny but while they are skating, her bloomers fall down. Mr. Fontayne, who is looking on, saves her from public embarrassment by hiding them and tactfully returning them to her later.

When the big senior dance approaches, Margie plans to attend with Roy, but at the last minute Roy catches a cold and is forced to cancel, leaving Margie without an escort. Margie is too embarrassed to go alone or tell Marybelle, who is going with Johnny, that she doesn't have a date, and instead gives Marybelle the impression that Mr. Fontayne is taking her to the dance. Margie's grandmother meanwhile secretly arranges for her father to cancel a business meeting and take his daughter to the dance, but tells Margie only that a man "much older than 15" called to take her to the dance and withholds the man's identity to surprise Margie. When Mr. Fontayne comes to the house with a corsage, Margie thinks he is her date and is thrilled that her fantasy came true, until she sees by the florist's card that the corsage was intended for Mr. Fontayne's actual date, the school librarian Miss Palmer. Mr. Fontayne only stopped by to drop off Margie's French composition and compliment her on her good work, although he privately confesses to her grandmother that he would rather be taking Margie to the dance instead of Miss Palmer. Margie is at first devastated, but when her actual surprise date — her father — arrives to escort her to the dance, she is happy again. At the dance, Mr. Fontayne dances with Margie and tells her he would rather dance with her than anyone else, and she even attracts the attention of Johnny. Returning to the 1940s, it turns out Margie married Mr. Fontayne, who is now the principal at the same high school.

== Cast ==
- Jeanne Crain as Marjorie 'Margie' MacDuff (singing voice dubbed by uncredited Louanne Hogan)
- Glenn Langan as Professor Ralph Fontayne
- Lynn Bari as Miss Isabel Palmer
- Alan Young as Roy Hornsdale
- Barbara Lawrence as Marybelle Tenor
- Conrad Janis as Johnny 'Johnikins' Green
- Esther Dale as Grandma McSweeney
- Hobart Cavanaugh as Mr. Angus MacDuff
- Ann Todd as Joyce, Margie's teenage daughter
- Hattie McDaniel as Cynthia

Uncredited (in order of appearance)
| Laurette Luez | student at Margie's school |
| Vanessa Brown | Wanda, student at Margie's school |
| Ruth Clifford | woman in audience at Margie's debate |
| Richard Kelton | student debater |
| Hazel Dawn | Vi |
| Milton Parsons | Jefferson |
| Buddy Clark [voice only] | singer |
| Ken Darby [voice only] | singer |
| Del Porter [voice only] | singer |
| Robert Scheerer | student at Margie's prom |

== Production ==
In January 1945, 20th Century Fox paid $12,500 for a story written by Ruth McKenney and her husband Richard Bransten. For the screenplay adaption, F. Hugh Herbert used elements from the film Girls' Dormitory (1936).

The male lead was initially offered to Cornel Wilde, but he refused it and was put on suspension by the studio. Next, Richard Jaeckel was announced as the male lead, but he was eventually replaced by Glenn Langan.

This film marks the screen debut of Alan Young, who had been acting on radio since 1944.

Set decorations include the 1794 Thomas Lawrence painting, Pinkie, which can be seen in the home of Margie and her grandmother, located on the wall in the sitting room.

The film was shot in Reno, Nevada. The exteriors of "Central High" are actually the University of Nevada, Reno. In some shots, the snow-covered Sierras can be seen. This film is considered an excellent example of the Technicolor film process.

A number of popular songs from the 1920s are used in the film, including "Margie" (the only song listed in the opening credits), "At Sundown", "My Time Is Your Time" (voice of uncredited Rudy Vallée), "A Cup of Coffee, a Sandwich and You", "I'll See You In My Dreams", "Three O'Clock in the Morning", "April Showers", "The Charleston", "Wonderful One", and "Ain't She Sweet".

== Reception ==
In his October 17, 1946 review for The New York Times, Bosley Crowther observes: "Seeing 'Margie' is like turning back the pages of an album on a quiet Sunday afternoon. In fact, F. Hugh Herbert, who wrote the screen play from a series of stories by Ruth McKenney and Richard Bransten, introduces the story as the reminiscences of a young matron to her jitterbug daughter during a session of rummaging through an old trunk in the attic... Margie's high school memoirs, and the crush she had on the handsome young French teacher are told with just a touch of pathos... Jeanne Crain in the title role acts and looks as fresh as a daisy, and brings just the right amount of wistfulness to her part..."
