= Elizabeth Zarubina =

Soviet spy (1900–1987)

Elizaveta Zarubina Елизавета Зарубина
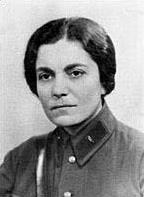
- Born: Ester Yoelevna Rosentsveig; 1 January 1900; Rzhavyntsi, Khotinsky Uyezd, Bessarabia Governorate, Russian Empire
- Died: 14 May 1987 (aged 87); Moscow, Russian SFSR, Soviet Union
- Spouse: Vasily Zarubin
- Espionage activity
- Allegiance: Soviet Union
- Service branch: OGPU, NKVD
- Service years: 1924–1944
- Rank: Podpolkovnik

Elizaveta Yulyevna Zarubina (Russian: Елизавета Юлиевна Зарубина; 1 January 1900 – 14 May 1987; née Ester Yoelevna Rosentsveig (Эстер Иоэльевна Розенцвейг)) was a Soviet spy, holding the rank of podpolkovnik in the Ministry of State Security (Soviet Union). She was known as Elizabeth Zubilin while serving in the United States. Another alias was Elizaveta Gorskaya.

== Early years ==
Born in Rzhavyntsi, in the Khotinsky Uyezd of the Bessarabia Governorate of the Russian Empire (present-day Ukraine) to Jewish parents, Yoel and Ita Rosentsveig. She studied history and philology at universities in Romania, France, and Austria, and spoke in English, French, German, Romanian, Russian and Yiddish.

== Career ==
Zarubina was one of the most successful agent recruiters, establishing her own illegal network of Jewish migrants from Poland, and recruiting one of Leó Szilárd's secretaries, who provided technical data. She was the wife of Soviet Intelligence Resident Vasily Zarubin. She was an active participant in the revolutionary movement in Bessarabia after World War I. In 1919, she became a member of the Komsomol of Bessarabia. She became part of the Soviet intelligence system in 1924.

In 1923, she joined the ranks of the Austrian Communist Party. From 1924 through 1925, she worked in the embassy and trade delegation of the USSR. From 1925 to 1928, she worked in the Vienna Rezidentura.

In 1929, Zarubina and Yakov Blumkin were posted as illegals in Turkey, where he sold Hasidic manuscripts from the Central Library in Moscow to support illegal operations in Turkey and the Middle East. Soviet intelligence officer Pavel Sudoplatov, who later organized Leon Trotsky's murder, writes in his autobiography that Blumkin gave part of the sale proceeds to Trotsky, who was then in exile in Turkey.

According to his account, Zarubina had an affair with Blumkin and that was part of a scheme to set him up so that he could be recalled to Moscow and executed. Shortly thereafter (1929), she married Vasily Zarubin, and they traveled and spied together for many years, using the cover of a Czechoslovak and American business couple for work in Denmark, Germany, France and the United States.

=== In the United States ===
In 1941, the Zarubins were sent to the United States, where Vasily was to serve as the first secretary to the Embassy of the Soviet Union, while Zarubina was responsible for collecting information about the development of nuclear weapons in the United States, as well as to recruit engineers working close to the Manhattan Project as their agents.

In August 1942, Paul Massing notified the NKVD that his friend, Franz Neumann, had recently joined the Office of Strategic Services (OSS). Massing reported to Moscow that Neumann had told him he had produced a study of the Soviet economy for the OSS's Russian Department.

In April 1943, Zarubina met with Neumann, "(Zarubina) met for the first time with (Neumann) who promised to pass us all the data coming through his hands. According to (Neumann), he is getting many copies of reports from American ambassadors ... and has access to materials referring to Germany." (Note: Venona project file 28734, p. 28.)

According to Jerrold and Leona Schecter, Zarubina was "one of the most successful operators in stealing atomic bomb secrets from the United States". Together with Gregory Kheifetz (the Soviet vice-consul in San Francisco from 1941 to 1944), she supposedly set up a social ring of young communist physicists around Robert Oppenheimer at Los Alamos to transmit nuclear weapon plans to Moscow, and befriended him in order to achieve her goal.

In 1944, the NKVD agent Vassili Mironov accused the Zarubins of being in secret contact with the FBI. In August 1944, Zarubina and her husband were recalled to Moscow to be investigated. It was found that the accusations from Mironov were false; he was later arrested for slander. Later that same year, she was awarded the Order of the Red Star, after recruiting a total of 22 agents in her network.

== Death ==
Zarubina died in a traffic accident in Moscow on 14 May 1987, aged 87. She was buried at Kalitnikovsky Cemetery.

== In Film ==
Zarubina's life as a spy is told in the 2015 video, "Cold War Secrets: Stealing the Atomic Bomb", directed by Gerard Puechmorel.

== Sources ==
- John Earl Haynes and Harvey Klehr, Venona: Decoding Soviet Espionage in America, Yale University Press, 1999. ISBN 0-300-08462-5.
- Jerrold L. Schecter and Leona Schecter, Sacred Secrets: How Soviet Intelligence Operations Changed American History, Potomac Books, 2002. ISBN 1-57488-327-5
- Pavel Sudoplatov, Anatoli Sudoplatov, Jerrold L. Schecter, Leona P. Schecter, Special Tasks: The Memoirs of an Unwanted Witness -- A Soviet Spymaster, Boston: Little, Brown and Company, 1994. ISBN 0-316-77352-2
- Allen Weinstein and Alexander Vassiliev, The Haunted Wood: Soviet Espionage in America—the Stalin Era, New York: Random House, 1999, pgs. 162, 249–50, 251, 274, 276, 303, 341. ISBN 0-679-45724-0
- Edvin Stavinsky "Zarubins-the family "rezidentura"" "Olma-press" 2002 Moscow (in Russian).
