= Kameshwar C. Wali =

Indian-American physicist (1927–2022)

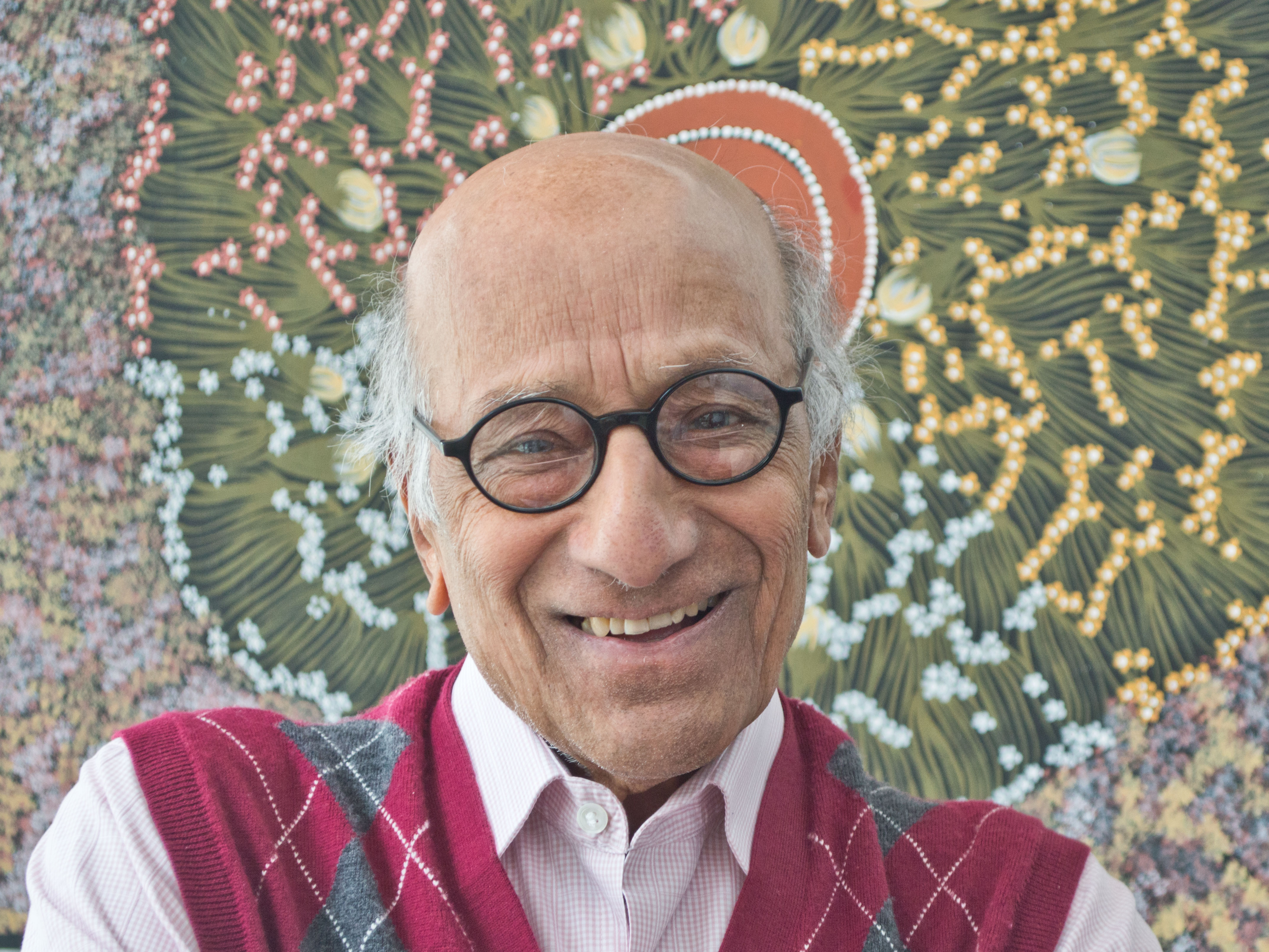
- Wali in 2014
- Born: October 15, 1927; Bijapur, Karnataka, British Raj
- Died: January 14, 2022 (aged 94); Syracuse, New York, U.S.
- Education: University of Wisconsin, Madison; Banaras Hindu University
- Known for: Symmetry properties of fundamental particles and their interactions History of physics and physicists
- Spouse: Kashi Wali
- Scientific career
- Fields: theoretical physics
- Workplaces: Syracuse University
- Thesis: The nucleon structure and the electromagnetic form factors. (1959)
- Doctoral advisor: Robert G. Sachs

Kameshwar C. Wali (October 15, 1927 – January 14, 2022) was an Indian-born American theoretical physicist who was the Distinguished Research Professor of Physics Emeritus at Syracuse University's College of Arts and Sciences. He was a specialist in high energy physics, particularly symmetries and dynamics of elementary particles, and the author of Chandra: A Biography of S. Chandrasekhar and Cremona Violins: a physicist's quest for the secrets of Stradivari.

== Early life and education ==
Wali was born at Bijapur in the state of Karnataka, India, in 1927. He was the seventh of ten children (three of whom died in infancy). His father, a civil servant in the British Colonial system, moved the family to Belgaum.

In 1944 Wali enrolled at the Raja Lakhamagouda Science Institute in Belgaum, newly founded by the Karnatak Lingayat Education Society (KLES) and inaugurated by the Sir C.V. Raman. He obtained his BSc with distinction in physics in 1948 and was appointed a lecturer in physics at the college before going on, in 1950, to commence post-graduate studies at Banaras Hindu University (BHU). He received his MSc in physics in 1952, specializing in spectroscopy, and was appointed a lecturer in the Science College. While teaching, he pursued independent studies for an MA in mathematics and received it in 1954. He was awarded the Chancellor's Gold Medal—the University's highest honor.

In 1955, Wali travelled to the United States to join the PhD program in physics at the University of Wisconsin, Madison. His advisor and mentor was Robert G. Sachs, later the associate director of the high-energy physics division at the Argonne National Laboratory. In 1959, Wali was joined in America by his wife and three daughters. Wali obtained his doctorate in 1959.

== Career ==
Wali became a research associate at Johns Hopkins University in 1960. In 1962 he joined Argonne National Laboratory, Illinois, as an assistant scientist in the Physics Division. The following year he joined the newly created High Energy Physics division at Argonne as an associate scientist. In 1967 he was promoted to senior scientist. Concurrently he taught courses at Northwestern University (1964–1966) and at the University of Chicago (1967–1969). He was a visiting scientist at the International Center for Theoretical Physics, at Trieste, Italy (1967).

In 1969, Wali joined the faculty of the Syracuse University physics department as full professor, a position he held until his retirement in 1998. Wali became the head of the High Energy Theory group in 1969. He served as chairman of the physics department from 1986 to 1989, and was the Joel Dorman Steele Professor at Syracuse between 1997–98.

He was project director of the Elementary Particle Theory Group, DOE from 1969 to 1993. He has been on the International Advisory Committee for PASCOS (Particles, Strings and Cosmology) Conference since its inception in 1994. During his sabbatical leaves, he was visiting scientist at the Institut des Hautes Études Scientifiques (IHES), Bures-sur-Yvette, France (Fall 1971, 1975, 1979, 1983, and Spring 1990); associate of the physics department, Harvard University (from 1982); visiting scientist, University of Chicago (Summer 1985); Dozor Visiting Fellow, Ben-Gurion University of the Negev, Beer-Sheva, Israel (Jan-Feb 1993); and senior scholar, Fulbright Foundation, Australia (Jan-May 1995). As a member of the United States and Vietnam Research Collaboration, Wali visited Hanoi in 1979 and 1989 for establishing research contacts and to present lectures.

Wali retired in 1998, and became a Distinguished Research Professor Emeritus at Syracuse University.

== Research ==
His specific research contributions include:

- Electromagnetic structure of the nucleon, providing a combination of the conventional Dirac and Pauli form factors as proper Fourier transforms of spatial charge and magnetization inside the nucleon.
- Theoretical considerations in exploring the spin and decay properties of new elementary particles being discovered.
- A relativistic matrix formulation of N/D method that provided a dynamical framework to predict the masses and decay widths of meson-baryon resonances based on the SU(3) symmetric octet model of Gell-Mann and Ne'eman.

- A relativistic extension of SU(6) symmetry that incorporated intrinsic spin and internal symmetries of SU(3). It came to be known as U(6,6) symmetry simultaneously proposed by Abdus Salam and co-workers. It provided a rich set of predictions for the spectra and their strong interactions known at the time.
- Veneziano model, Regge trajectories and duality between direct and crossed channel resonances, leading to classification of Regge trajectories, restrictions on the coupling constants and hence the width of the resonances.
- Grand Unified Theories (GUTS). Proposals of higher symmetries and their implications regarding the generation problem, mass hierarchies, mixing angles and patterns of spontaneous symmetry breaking.
- A unified treatment of gauge bosons and scalar Higgs bosons within the framework of noncommutative algebraic geometry.
- Magnetic monopoles and dyons in the Einstein-Yang-Mills-Higgs Systems. Black holes with quantized charge and quantized mass.
- Two-sheeted space-time, bi-metric relativity, chiral spinors and gauge fields.
- Domain wall solutions, clash of symmetries, a new way of breaking symmetries in Randall-Sundrum-like space-time and SU(5) grand unification on a domain-wall brane.
- Modified Einstein equations and their consequences in Kaluza-Klein Theory with torsion confined to the extra-dimension. A metric theory of gravitation.

== Contributions to the history of physics ==
Wali is a founding member of the Forum on the History of Physics within the American Physical Society. He wrote the authoritative biography of the astrophysicist Subrahmanyan Chandrasekhar. Chandra: A Biography of S. Chandrasekhar (published in 1991 by The University of Chicago Press), complemented by subsequent articles and books on Chandra: S Chandrasekhar: The Man Behind The Legend, and A Quest for Perspectives: Selected Works of S Chandrasekhar. He also edited Chandrasekhar's scientific journals, which were published in A Scientific Autobiography, S Chandrasekhar (2010).

His other books include Cremona Violins: A Physicist's Quest for Secrets of Stradivari (ISBN 978-9812791108) and Satyendra Nath Bose—His Life and Times: Selected Works. (ISBN 978-9812790712)

== Honors ==
- Fellow of the American Physical Society.
- Founding member of the Forum on the History of Physics within the American Physical Society and served on its executive committee.
- Walifest-MRST 15, celebrating Wali's sixty fifth birthday, 1993.
- Scientist of the Year Award 2001, India chapter of American Physical Society.
- In 2008 a dedicated Kameshwar C. Wali Lecture in the Sciences and Humanities at Syracuse University was established by Wali's daughters, Alaka, Achala and Monona. The inaugural lecture, Evolution and Symbiosis: Memoirs of Planet Earth, was given by Lynn Margulis. Subsequent lectures in the series have been given inter alia by Janna Levin, George Packer, Ian Shipsey, Arthur Zajonc Diane Ackerman, and Abhay Ashtekar.

== Personal life and death ==
Wali married Kashi Kulkarni in May 1952. She was a fellow student at BHU doing her MSc in physics.

At Syracuse, he befriended writers Tess Gallagher and Raymond Carver.

He died in Syracuse, New York, on January 14, 2022, at the age of 94.

== Bibliography ==
=== Books ===
- Wali, Kameshwar C. (21 February 2021). Fads and Fancies of Elementary Particle Physics: Selected Works of Kameshwar C Wali. World Scientific. doi:10.1142/12276. ISBN 978-981-12-3690-7. S2CID 233544024.
- Chandra: A biography of S. Chandrasekhar, University of Chicago Press (1991).
- S. Chandrasekhhar: The Man Behind the Legend, Imperial College Press, London (1997).
- A Quest for Perspectives: Selected Works of S. Chandrasekhar (With Commentary), Volumes 1&2, Imperial College Press, London (2001).
- Robert Green Sachs (1916-1999): A Biographical Memoir, National Academies Press, Washington, D.C. (2004).
- Subrahmanyan Chandrasekhar: New Dictionary of Scientific Biography, Charles Scribner's Sons, (2007).
- Satyendra Nath Bose (1894-1974): His Life and Times Selected Works (With Commentary), World Scientific, Singapore (2009).
- Cremona Violins: A Physicist's Quest for the Secrets of Stradivari, World Scientific, Singapore (2010).
- S Chandrasekhar: Selected Correspondence and Conversations, World Scientific, Singapore (2020).

=== Articles ===
- Experiment and Theory in Physics, Progress In Theoretical Physics, in honor of Y. Nambu's 60th Birthday Celebration. (1981)
- The Split Face of Science: Is Science An Endangered Species? The Cultures of Science, Marjorie Senechal, Editor, Nova Science Publishers, Inc, 1994
- Chandrasekhar vs. Eddington—An Unanticipated Confrontation, Physics Today, October 1982
- Satyendra Nath Bose: The Man behind the Statistics, Physics Today, (December 2006).
- Chandra: A Biographical Portrait, Physics Today, December 2010
