= Frances Ullmann DeArmand =

American editor

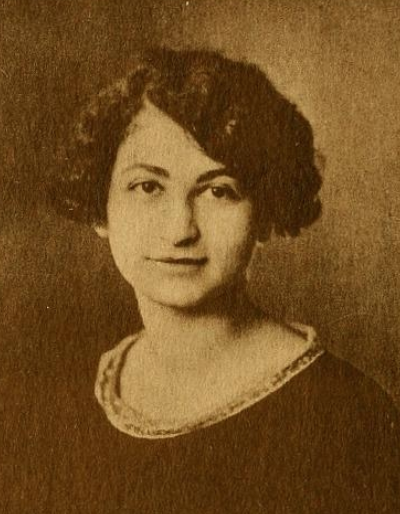
- Frances M. Ullmann, from the 1925 yearbook of Wellesley College
- Born: March 17, 1904; Springfield, Missouri, U.S.
- Died: April 14, 1984 (age 80); New York, New York, U.S.
- Occupations: Editor, writer
- Relatives: William Ludwig Ullmann (brother)

Frances M. Ullmann DeArmand (March 17, 1904 – April 14, 1984) was an American editor and writer, mainly of works for young readers (including comic books), or for parents and educators.

== Early life and education ==
Ullmann was born in Springfield, Missouri, the daughter of William Ullmann and Caroline Block Ullmann. Her father was a businessman and banker, and her mother was vice-president of the National Congress of Parents and Teachers. Her younger brother, William Ludwig Ullmann, was an official in the United States Department of the Treasury who was suspected of spying during the Cold War.

Ullmann graduated from Springfield High School in 1920, attended Drury College for one year, and graduated from Wellesley College in 1925.

== Career ==
DeArmand worked as an editor at magazines, including Parents Magazine, and comics-heavy children's periodicals Calling All Girls and Calling All Kids. She was assistant editor of Child Welfare in the 1930s, an editor of National Parent-Teacher Magazine from 1931 to 1937, and of Child Study from 1941 to 1947. She was managing editor of the Encyclopedia of Child Care and Guidance from 1951 to 1954. She was an executive of the Junior Literary Guild from 1954 to 1969.

== Publications ==
- "Getting Ready for Book Week" (1931)
- "The Place of the Home in the Community" (1937)
- "Seeing Ourselves as Children See Us" (1937)
- Never to be Forgotten (1943, as editor)
- Girl Alive (1947, stories for teens, illustrated by Kathleen Morrissey)
- "Getting Along with Brothers and Sisters" (1950, a 48-page illustrated booklet published by Science Research Associates)
- "Life with Brothers and Sisters" (1952, a booklet published by Science Research Associates)
- When Mother Was a Girl: Stories She Read Then (1964, as editor)
- A Very, Very Special Day (1968, illustrated by Tom Vroman)

== Personal life ==
Ullmann married David William DeArmand in 1942. She died in 1984, at the age of 80, in New York City.
