= Semyon Semyonov =

Soviet intelligence agent

Semyon Markovich Semyonov (Russian: Семён Маркович Семёнов; 1 March 1911 – 1986) was a Soviet intelligence agent, best known for handling convicted Soviet spy Julius Rosenberg.

== Background ==
Semyonov was born Samuil Markovich Taubman in Odesa and graduated from the Moscow Textile Institute in 1936 with a specialty in power engineering.

== Career ==
Of Jewish ancestry, Semyonov joined the NKVD in 1937 and was sent quickly to the United States as an intelligence officer. He enrolled at the Massachusetts Institute of Technology, from which he graduated in June 1940 and shortly thereafter began working for Amtorg. Semyonov had a mastery of French and English.

Semyonov worked first as a purchasing agent for the Soviet agency Machinoimport and then as head of the engineering department of the Soviet Purchasing Commission during World War II, with offices both at the commission and at Amtorg while specializing in scientific and technical espionage.

A Russian Foreign Intelligence Service history quotes his KGB personnel files as stating, "While working from 1938 through 1944 in the United States, Major Semyonov showed himself to be one of the most active workers in the rezidentura [station] and credits him with connecting to 20 agents along the scientific and technical line".

In 1942 Semyonov persuaded Vasily Zarubin to transfer Julius Rosenberg and his contacts from the CPUSA-Jacob Golos channel to the direct control of the Rezidentura, with himself as the assigned case officer. The actual transfer occurred on Labor Day weekend, 7 September 1942, at a meeting in Central Park. Bernard Schuster brought Rosenberg to the meeting. Rosenberg was then subjected to a thorough vetting and recruitment process to include training in tradecraft and a probationary period. Aleksandr Feklisov was assigned to assist in managing Rosenberg. Once the formal recruitment of Rosenberg was completed Semyonov used Rosenberg to conduct formal recruitments of two of Rosenberg's friends from City College of New York, Joel Barr and William Perl.

Semyonov persuaded into collaboration a large group of young scientists and specialists, through whom was obtained a significant quantity of valuable materials on "ENORMOZ" (Manhattan Project), radio electronics, jet aviation, chemistry, medicine. Semyonov received from Bruno Pontecorvo in January 1943 an extensive report on the first nuclear chain reaction. Pontecorvo also relayed to Semyonov in early 1943 that "Fermi was prepared to provide information."

In 1943 the active intelligence operation of Semyonov drew the attention of American counter espionage, and Semyonov was recalled to the Soviet Union. Later he had assignments in France and in Moscow and was promoted to the rank of lieutenant-colonel.

In 1950, in association with the Doctors' plot, the foreign intelligence agency began dismissing persons of Jewish ethnicity. In spite of significant positive results in his record, Semyonov was discharged. He worked as translator in the publishing house Progress. Semyonov was rehabilitated in the 1970s.

For the successful completion of special missions concerning scientific and technical intelligence, including on the atomic programs, Semyonov was awarded the Order of the Red Star and awarded the Order of the Red Banner of Labour.
