= Yakov Blumkin =

Russian revolutionary and spy (1900–1929)

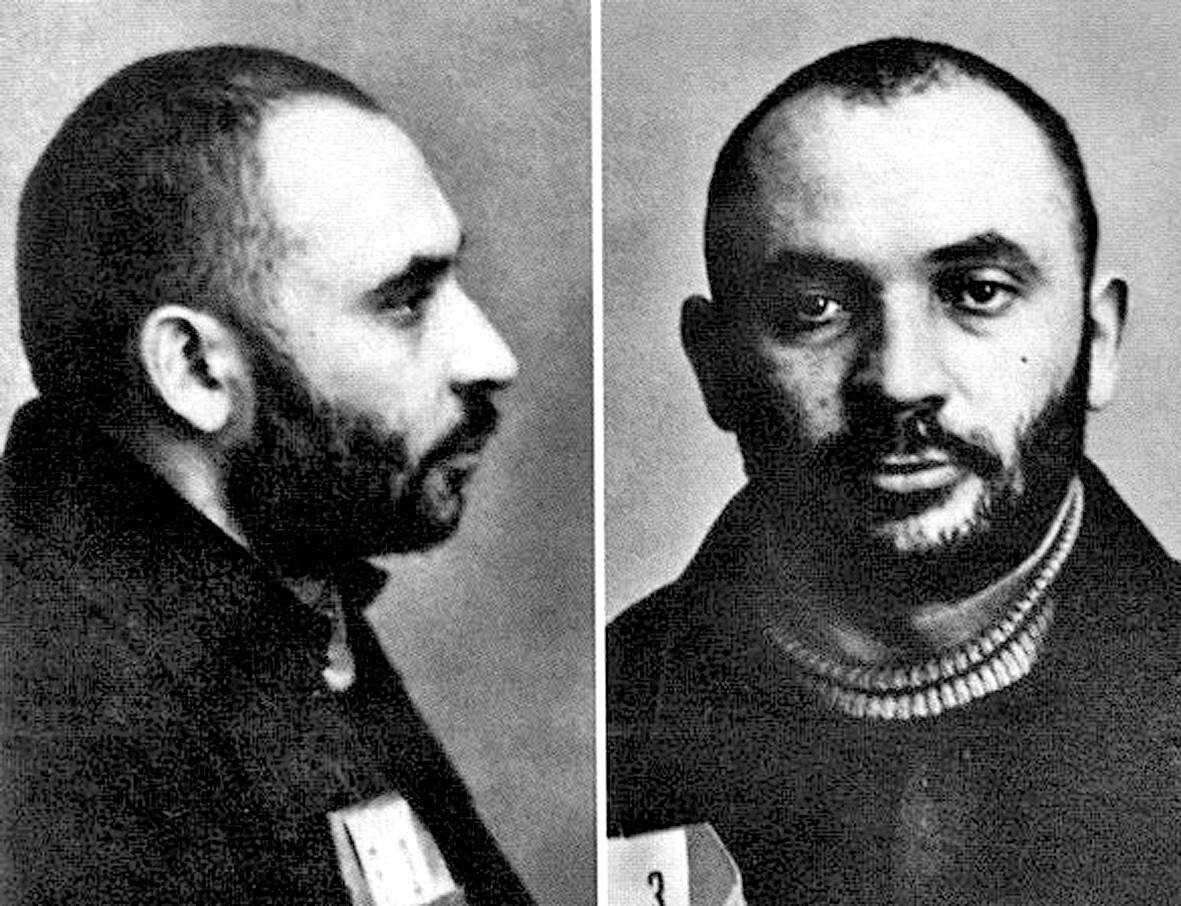
- Blumkin's 1929 mugshot
- Born: Yakov Grigoryevich Blumkin; 12 March [O.S. 28 February] 1900; Odessa, Russian Empire
- Died: 3 November 1929 (aged 29); Soviet Union
- Military career
- Branch: Cheka, OGPU
- Rank: Intelligence officer

Yakov Grigoryevich Blumkin (Russian: Я́ков Григо́рьевич Блю́мкин; 12 March 1900 – 3 November 1929) was a Left Socialist-Revolutionary, a Bolshevik, and an agent of the Cheka and the Joint State Political Directorate (OGPU).

== Early life ==
Blumkin was born into a Jewish shopkeeper's family, was orphaned early in his life, and was raised in Odessa. After four years in a Jewish school, he was sent to work running errands for shops and offices. In 1914, he joined the Socialist-Revolutionary Party.

== Cheka employee ==
After the October Revolution in 1917, he became head of the Cheka's counter-espionage department working for Felix Dzerzhinsky.

== Terrorist ==
Popov's Cheka detachment that included Blumkin, consisted of Left Socialist Revolutionaries rather than Bolsheviks. Since this party was opposed to the Treaty of Brest-Litovsk, Blumkin was ordered by its executive committee to assassinate Wilhelm von Mirbach, the German ambassador to Russia. They hoped by this action to incite a war with Germany. This event was timed to occur at the opening of the Fifth All–Russian Congress of Soviets at the Bolshoi Theater in Moscow. On the afternoon of 6 July 1918, Blumkin and Nikolai Andreev went to the German Embassy. Blumkin gained entrance to the embassy by presenting forged documents. With Mirbach was Dr. Rietzler, the Counsellor of the Embassy, and Lieutenant Moeller, a military attaché. Blumkin pulled a gun and fired at all three, while Andreev hurled a bomb. Both then fled through a window, where Blumkin broke his leg, but both made it back to the Pokrovsky Barracks, the location of the Socialist Revolutionary staff. The assassination was timed with the Left SR uprising, which was quickly quelled. The members of the Left SR party at the Bolshoi Theatre were arrested and the party was forcibly suppressed. Blumkin, however, escaped and went into hiding. He fled to Ukraine and helped reestablish the Soviet regime. On 16 May 1919, the All-Russian Central Executive Committee pardoned him.

In Kyiv, he organized an assassination attempt against the Hetman Pavlo Skoropadskyi and fought in the LSR insurrection against the government of Symon Petliura. In April 1919 Blumkin surrendered to the Bolsheviks, who still had a warrant for his arrest. Dzerzhinsky pardoned Blumkin, due to his voluntary surrender, and ordered him to return to Ukraine to assassinate the visiting Admiral Kolchak. While forming a combat group, Blumkin survived three assassination attempts made by his former LSR comrades. He joined the 13th Red Army as director of counter-espionage and worked under Georgy Pyatakov.

== Persia ==
In the spring of 1920, Dzerzhinsky sent Blumkin to the Iranian province of Gilan, on the Caspian Sea, where the Jungle Movement under the leadership of Mirza Koochak Khan, had established a secessionist government called the Persian Socialist Soviet Republic. On 30 May 1920, Blumkin, with his penchant for intrigue, fomented a coup d'état which drove Koochak Khan and his party from power and replaced them with the Bolshevik-controlled Iranian Communist Party.

The new government, nominally headed by Kuchak Khan's second-in-command, Ehsanollah Khan, was dominated by the Russian Commissar, Abukov. He commenced a series of radical reforms which included closing of mosques and confiscating money from the rich. Blumkin became chief of the General Staff of the Persian Red Army. An army was raised with the intention of marching on Tehran and bringing Persia under the Red Banner.

In August 1920, Blumkin was back in Petrograd where he was entrusted with the command of an armored train that conveyed Grigory Zinoviev, Karl Radek, Béla Kun, and John Reed from the 2nd World Congress of the Communist International to the Congress of the Peoples of the East in Baku. Their journey took them through parts of Western Russia where the Civil War still lingered.

Blumkin claimed he served as a member of the Persian delegation, perhaps incognito because his name is not listed in the published rolls. At the congress, the delegates enacted the proposal of Zinoviev, leader of the Comintern, which called upon the Bolsheviks to support the uprisings of native peoples from the Middle East against the British. Lenin shortly afterwards abandoned this policy in order to sign a treaty with Great Britain.

== Relations with poets ==
Blumkin was a lover of poetry. In July 1921, Nikolay Gumilyov, a monarchist who was shot soon afterwards, was giving a poetry recital in a cafe in Petrograd when "a man in a leather jacket", described as having "bold features, framed by a black beard, and his face looked biblical", began reciting as if "drunk on Gumilyov's verses". Gumilyov was astonished when the man was introduced as the notorious Yakov Blumkin and remarked, "I'm happy when my poems are read by warriors and people of great strength". Gumilyov later wrote "The man amidst crowd who shot the Imperial Ambassador came up to shake me by the hand and thank me for my verses".

In 1923, the diplomat Alexander Barmine travelled by train from Moscow to Baku with Blumkin and the poet Sergei Yesenin, who was on a downward slide and committed suicide later. Barmine recalled that "They got on well together and never went to bed sober. Blumkin, whose soldierly temperament always saved him from excesses, had saddled himself with the job of 'pulling Sergei together'. It was more than anyone could do." Blumkin was often seen meandering about Moscow with poets as an adherent of the Imaginism literary movement to which Esenin belonged, boasting a gun and a notorious reputation.

Blumkin also knew Osip Mandelstam. There is a story told by Mandelstam's biographer Clarence Brown:

One evening early in the Revolution he was sitting in a cafe and there was the notorious Socialist Revolutionary terrorist Blumkin… at that time an official of the Cheka… drunkenly copying the names of men and women to be executed onto blank forms already signed by the head of the secret police. Mandelstam suddenly threw himself at him, seized the lists, tore them to pieces before the stupefied onlookers, then ran out and disappeared. On this occasion he was saved by Trotsky's sister.

Mandelstam's widow told a different, and probably more accurate version of the story. She said that Blumkin tried to persuade Mandelstam to work for the Cheka, soon after it was founded and before the Mirbach assassination. Blumkin was also a regular and "welcome" guest in the Poets' Cafe, in Moscow, where Mandelstam overheard him boasting that he was going to have an art historian shot. Mandelstam, who did not know the intended victim, was so angry that he persuaded the poetry-loving Bolshevik Larissa Reissner to join him in a direct approach to the head of the Cheka, Felix Dzerzhinsky, and saved the man's life.

In 1919, Mandelstam and his wife were on a balcony in Kiev, when Blumkin rode past at the head of a cavalcade, dressed in a black coat, and when he saw Mandelstam, drew a pistol pointed it at him, but did not fire. He threatened Mandelstam with a gun several times, but never fired, and probably had no intention of killing him.

When Blumkin returned from Persia, the French writer Victor Serge heard him declaim lines written by the Persian epic poet Ferdowsi. At that time, Blumkin was "more poised and virile than ever, his face solid and smooth-shaven, the haughty profile of an Israelite warrior. He stayed in a small apartment in the Arbat quarter, bare except for a rug and a splendid stool, a gift from some Mongol prince; and crooked sabres hung over his bottles of excellent wine."

== Vagabond agent ==
After his adventure in the Caucasus, Blumkin returned to Moscow and became a student at the military college. He befriended Leon Trotsky, becoming a secretary, and helped over the next two years with the "selection, critical checking, arrangement and correction of the material" in Trotsky's Military Writings (1923). Trotsky noted in particular the irony of a former Left SR conspirator editing the volume describing the Left SR conspiracy. Blumkin introduced Yesenin to Trotsky in the hope that Trotsky would sponsor and promote a literary journal. That sharing of friendship, scholarship, and political ideas with Trotsky would later cost Blumkin his life.

From the summer of 1924 to the fall of 1925, he worked for the OGPU in Tiflis and was the Assistant Chairman of the Soviet delegation in the mixed Soviet-Persian Border commission and a member of the Soviet delegation in the mixed Soviet-Turkish Border commission. It is claimed that in 1924, he travelled secretly to Afghanistan or Pamir to contact the Ismailites and the local representative of the Aga Khan for the purposes of "anti-imperialist struggle" against the British, and then disguised himself as a dervish and travelled with an Ismailite caravan and explored the British military positions in India as far south as Ceylon.

In 1926, Blumkin was supposedly the secret representative of the GPU in Mongolia, where he ruled for some time as a virtual dictator and occasionally travelled on missions in China, Tibet, and India, until he was recalled to Moscow because the local communist leadership was tired of his reign of terror.

In his book The Storm Petrels, Gordon Brook-Shepherd relates that the GPU sent Blumkin to Paris in October 1929 to assassinate the defector and former Stalin personal secretary, Boris Bazhanov. In fact, the information comes from Bazhanov himself. Although it became common gossip among the inmates of the labor camps that Blumkin had indeed killed Bazhanov, and Aleksandr Solzhenitsyn repeats that legend in The Gulag Archipelago, the truth is that Bazhanov died in 1982. Bazhanov was then also aware of the rumour of his own murder and wrote that Stalin had probably planted the rumour to instill fear.

== Later life ==
In 1929, Blumkin was the chief illegal resident in Turkey, where he allegedly sold Hebrew incunabula that he collected from synagogues all over Ukraine and Southern Russia and even from state museums such as the Lenin Library in Moscow, to finance an espionage network in the Middle East. He supposedly travelled personally to Ukraine to look for rare Hebrew books, but he also spent time in Palestine and elsewhere organizing the network by posing as a devout Jewish laundry owner or as a Jewish salesman from Azerbaijan. Eventually, he was deported from Palestine by the British.

It is known that during his work in Turkey, Blumkin met with Trotsky, who lived there after his expulsion from the Soviet Union. Trotsky gave Blumkin a secret message to transmit to Karl Radek, Trotsky's former supporter and friend in Moscow, which was seen by Stalin as an attempt to set up lines of communication with "co-thinkers" and "oppositionists" in the Soviet Union. Information about the meeting reached the OGPU.

Trotsky later claimed that Radek had betrayed Blumkin to Stalin, and Radek would later acknowledge his complicity, but it is also likely that the information was passed along by an OGPU informer within Trotsky's entourage.

After Blumkin met with Radek in Moscow, Mikhail Trilisser, head of the OGPU Foreign Section, ordered an attractive agent, Lisa Gorskaya (also known as Elizabeth Zubilin) to "abandon bourgeois prejudice" and to seduce Blumkin. The couple carried on an affair lasting several weeks, and Gorskaya revealed their pillow talk to Trilisser. When agents sent to arrest Blumkin arrived at his apartment, he was getting into a car with Gorskaya. A chase ensued, and shots were fired. Blumkin stopped the car, turned to Gorskaya and said, "Lisa, you have betrayed me!"

After his arrest, Blumkin was brought before an OGPU tribunal consisting of Yagoda, Menzhinsky, and Trilisser. The defector Georges Agabekov claimed: "Yagoda pronounced for the death penalty. Trilliser was against it. Menzhinsky was undecided". The matter was referred to the Politburo in which Stalin ended the deadlock by declaring himself for the death penalty.

In his Memoirs of a Revolutionary (1941), Victor Serge related that Blumkin was given a two-week reprieve so that he could write his autobiography. That manuscript, if indeed it ever existed, remains undiscovered. Alexander Orlov wrote that Blumkin stood before a firing squad and shouted, "Long live Trotsky!" The Russian government has never rehabilitated Blumkin.

== See also ==
- Sidney Reilly
- Elizabeth Zarubina
