= John Henry Williams (economist) =

American economist

John H. Williams
- Born: June 21, 1887; Ystradgynlais, Wales
- Died: December 24, 1980 (aged 93); Southbridge, Massachusetts

Academic background
- Education: Harvard University; Brown University
- Doctoral advisor: Frank William Taussig

Academic work
- Institutions: Harvard University
- Doctoral students: Lauchlin Currie

John Henry Williams (June 21, 1887 – December 24, 1980) was an American economist. He was a professor of economics at Harvard University from 1921 to 1957. He was later appointed dean of the Graduate School of Public Administration at Harvard, and also served as Nathaniel Ropes Professor. He was an elected member of both the American Academy of Arts and Sciences and the American Philosophical Society. In 1951, he was president of the American Economic Association. The John H. Williams Prize was established at Harvard in 1958.
