= Worldwide Assurance for Employees of Public Agencies =

Worldwide Assurance for Employees of Public Agencies, Inc.
- Type: Nonprofit
- Industry: Insurance: Group Term Life
- Founded: 1943
- Headquarters: Falls Church, Virginia, U.S.
- Area served: Worldwide
- Key people: M. Shane Canfield, CEO
- Products: Group Term Life Insurance, Group Short-Term Disability Insurance, Chronic Illness Rider, Financial Education for Members
- Revenue: ▲$55.4 million USD (2025)
- Total assets: ▲US$133 million (2025)
- Website: www.waepa.org

Worldwide Assurance for Employees of Public Agencies, Inc., widely known by its abbreviated name WAEPA, is a United States' nonprofit 501(c)(9) VEBA association headquartered in Falls Church, Virginia, that provides life insurance and financial service benefits to federal civilian employees. Before WAEPA, civilian employees had limited life insurance options until the Federal Employees' Group Life Insurance Act of 1954 provided group life insurance by the U.S. Government. WAEPA's insurance products are underwritten by the New York Life Insurance Company. The association has more than 50,000 members from every civilian agency of the Federal government.

== History ==
WAEPA was formed during World War II, when, at the request of U.S. President Franklin D. Roosevelt, U.S. Secretary of the Treasury Henry Morgenthau Jr. contacted life insurance companies throughout the country asking if they would provide a maximum of $10,000 of life coverage for civilian government employees serving in war zones. At that time, United States civilians who chose to serve their country by entering foreign service did so with the knowledge that their current coverage in life insurance was largely vitiated by restrictive clauses covering travel in war zones, overseas aviation, etc.

Finding the insurance rates to be cost prohibitive, Morgenthau formed an informal committee made up of officials from the Office of Lend-Lease Administration, Board of Economic Warfare, Office of Foreign Relief and Rehabilitation Operations, United States Office of War Information and White House Economic Advisor Lauchlin Currie to investigate the possibility of attaining group life coverage. The first inquiry was made into extending the provisions of the National Service Life Insurance Act to include civilian foreign service personnel, however the Bureau of the Budget opposed to revise the law to make them eligible. Additional efforts were made to gain membership into The American Foreign Service Protective Association, which was formed in 1929 for American Foreign Service Officers, but eligibility was restricted only to members of the Department of State.

In April 1943, the committee determined that the only way it could accomplish its goals would be to form a separate association for the purpose of purchasing group life insurance. Articles of association were drafted and adopted, and the War Agencies Employees Protective Association (WAEPA) came into existence in May 1943. Current and former U.S. Government Federal employees were eligible to join the board of directors, with the original board composed of representatives from the committee charter agencies as to the members interests; however, board members served without compensation. Already a founding member, Lauchlin Currie became WAEPA's first president from May 1943 until his retirement in June 1945.

The Equitable Life Assurance Society was selected to underwrite the association's policies, setting up a worldwide system of low cost group life insurance. Through WAEPA, Equitable sold policies to employees of 40 U.S. agencies, including individuals from the Offices of Strategic Services and War Information, which often sent their men behind enemy lines, and also included air-traveling statesmen and Congressmen. By May 1945 only 24 death claims had been filed, allowing the insurer to return roughly 30% of the premiums to WAEPA. In turn, WAEPA was able to return a portion of those premiums back to their members.

In 1961, the association changed its name and organizational structure to Worldwide Assurance for Employees of Public Agencies, and adopted a 501(c)(9) status.

In November 1976, the association sold its building at 1720 Massachusetts Avenue, N.W. in Washington, D.C., then relocated offices to Falls Church, Virginia.

In January 2017, WAEPA partnered with New York Life Insurance Company to underwrite its Group Term Life Insurance, ending its nearly 74-year relationship with AXA Equitable Life Insurance Company.

WAEPA expanded its Group Term Life Insurance maximum coverage to $2 million in August 2026. The organization also offers a Chronic Illness Rider, Guaranteed Issue Group Term Life Insurance, and Group Short-Term Disability Insurance for new federal employees.

Since 1996, WAEPA has refunded over $101 Million dollars in premiums to its members.

== Member eligibility ==
WAEPA membership is open to all current, former, and retired U.S. civilian Federal Government employees, regardless of duty assignment, and their family members. Members' spouses are eligible to apply for Associate Member status to gain access to higher coverage levels than dependents. Full-time members of the armed services are not eligible for WAEPA coverage.

== Philanthropic Efforts ==
=== WAEPA Scholarship Program ===
Established in 2007, the WAEPA Scholarship Program offers tuition assistance to children of members. Each year, the program provides support to as many as 90 students. Since its inception, it has distributed more than $3 million in awards to nearly 1,300 recipients.

Eligible applicants include high school seniors or graduates who plan to enroll, or are currently enrolled, in full-time undergraduate programs at accredited two- or four-year colleges, universities, or vocational-technical institutions.

=== Premium Refunds ===
WAEPA periodically issues premium refunds to its members, returning a portion of collected premiums. Since 1996, the organization has distributed more than $125 million through this program.

=== Strategic Impact Partnerships ===
In 2025, WAEPA announced partnerships with three organizations: the African American Federal Executive Association (AAFEA), Blacks in Government (BIG), and Women in Federal Law Enforcement (WIFLE). These partnerships include financial sponsorship and support as part of WAEPA’s broader community and professional engagement activities.
