= Lauchlin Currie =

American economist

Lauchlin Bernard Currie
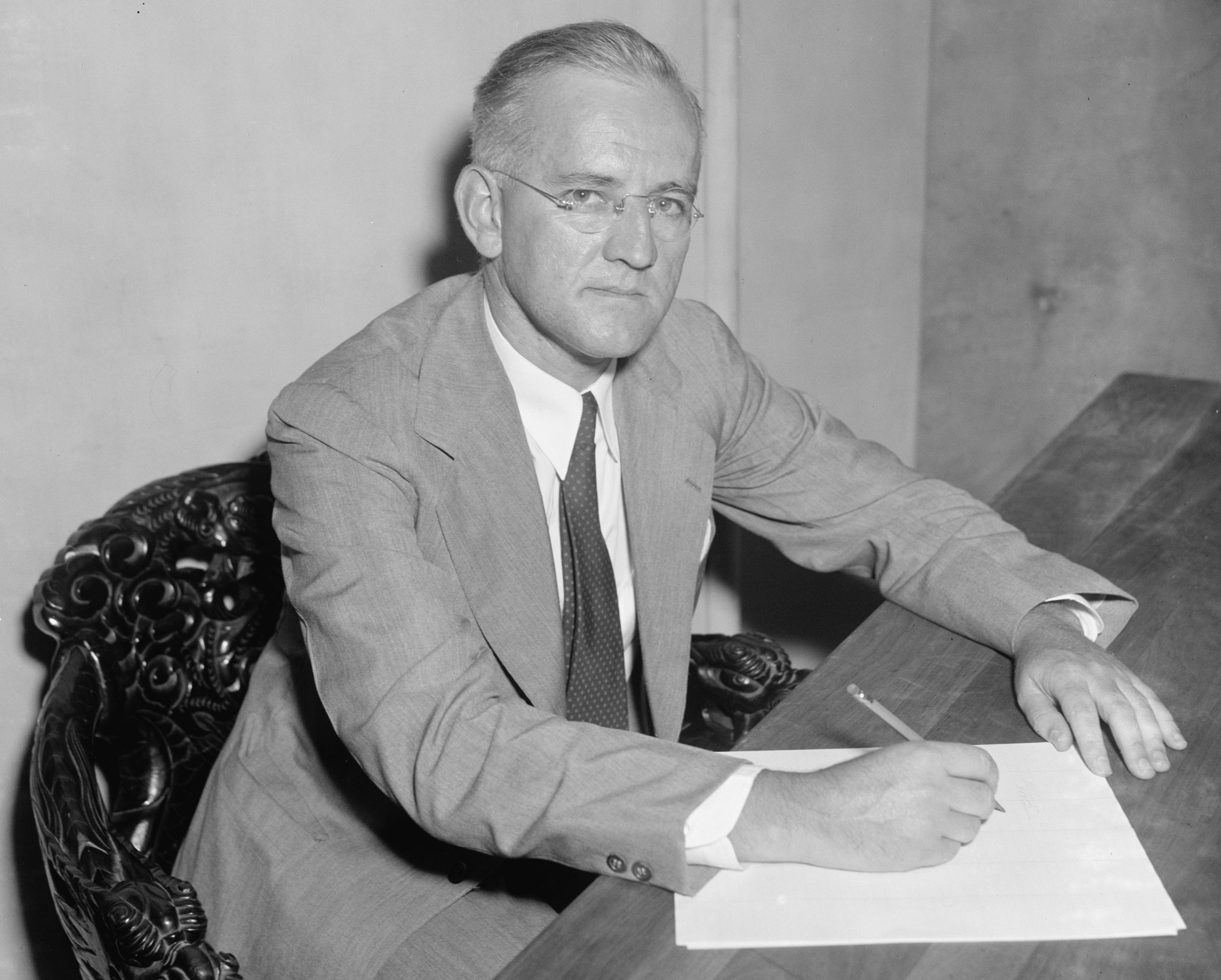
- Currie in 1939
- Born: October 8, 1902; West Dublin, Nova Scotia, Canada
- Died: December 23, 1993 (aged 91); Bogotá, Colombia
- Citizenship: Canada; United States; Colombia

Academic background
- Education: London School of Economics (BSc); Harvard University (PhD)
- Doctoral advisor: John H. Williams
- Influences: Allyn Abbott Young

Academic work
- Discipline: monetary economics development economics urban planning
- Institutions: Harvard University; Federal Reserve; National Planning Department
- Notable students: Paul Sweezy
- Notable ideas: Banking Act of 1935
- Awards: Order of Boyaca

Lauchlin Bernard Currie (8 October 1902 – 23 December 1993) was a Canadian-Colombian economist best known for being President Franklin Roosevelt's chief economic advisor during World War II.

After Roosevelt's death, he led the first World Bank survey mission to Colombia and eventually settled there for the rest of his life, becoming an economic advisor to the Colombian government. This permanent relocation was not entirely voluntarily, as the U.S. had refused to renew his passport in 1954. This refusal was ostensibly because he was married to a non-US citizen and residing abroad, but was possibly influenced by the fact Currie had been named as a Soviet spy by two Soviet defectors and in nine partially decrypted Venona cables sent by Soviet agents. He was never charged with a crime related to espionage or security violations; debate remains whether he knowingly collaborated with agents of the Soviet Union.

== Childhood and education ==
Currie was born on 8 October 1902 in West Dublin, Nova Scotia, to Lauchlin Bernard Currie, an operator of a fleet of merchant ships, and Alice Eisenhauer Currie, a schoolteacher. After his father died in 1906, his family moved to nearby Bridgewater, Nova Scotia, where he was educated in the local schools.

Currie had begun to demonstrate studious habits (like reading late into the night) by the time his family moved to Massachusetts, but he drove automobiles "with his foot on the floor board" for relaxation. He also attended school in California, where he had relatives.

From 1920 to 1922, Currie attended St. Francis Xavier University before transferring to the London School of Economics to study under Edwin Cannan, Hugh Dalton, Arthur Lyon Bowley, and Harold Laski. After graduating with a BSc in 1925, he enrolled at Harvard University to study under Allyn Abbott Young, who ironically left in 1927 for the LSE (then died from influenza in 1929). Young remained an influence, however, and Currie's final paper—on Youngian endogenous growth theory—was posthumously published in 1997. Currie graduated with a PhD in 1931, and his dissertation on banking theory was supervised by John H. Williams.

== Harvard ==
Currie remained at Harvard until 1934 as a teaching assistant to John H. Williams, Ralph George Hawtrey, and Joseph Schumpeter, and one of his students was Paul Sweezy.

In a January 1932 memorandum on anti-Depression policy, Currie and fellow instructors Harry Dexter White and Paul Theodore Ellsworth urged large fiscal deficits coupled with open market operations to expand bank reserves, as well as the lifting of tariffs and the relief of interallied debts.

In 1934, Currie constructed the first money supply and income velocity series for the United States. He blamed the government's "commercial loan theory" of banking for monetary tightening in mid-1929, when the economy was already declining, and then for its passivity during the next four years in the face of mass liquidations and bank failures. Instead, he advocated control of the money supply to stabilize income and expenditures. He cited his colleague and covert Soviet agent Abraham George Silverman for his "many helpful suggestions and criticisms" in the formation of this line of thinking.

== Federal Reserve ==
In 1934, Currie became a naturalized U.S. citizen and joined Jacob Viner's "freshman brain trust" at the Treasury Department, where he outlined an ideal monetary system for the U.S. that included a 100-percent reserve banking plan to strengthen central bank control and prevent bank panics in the future by preventing member banks from lending out their demand deposit liabilities, while removing reserve requirements on savings deposits with low turnover. Later that year, Marriner S. Eccles left the Treasury to become Chair of the Federal Reserve and took Currie with him as his personal assistant. Harry White was another "freshman brain trust" recruit who became a top advisor to Treasury Secretary Henry Morgenthau Jr., and White and Currie worked closely in their respective roles for some years after.

In his role as deputy director of the Department of Investigation, Currie drafted what became the Banking Act of 1935, which reorganized the Federal Reserve and strengthened its powers. He also constructed a "net federal income-creating expenditure series" to show the strategic role of fiscal policy in complementing monetary policy to revive an economy in exceptionally acute, persisting depression. Currie's preferred 100-percent reserve banking idea, however, was not one of the reforms implemented. Alan Meltzer wrote in his history of the Federal Reserve that "Lauchlin Currie wrote a remarkable memo for a Treasury committee in 1934 emphasizing the role of money in cyclical fluctuations, at a time when virtually no one thought that money mattered."

In 1937, the economy declined sharply after four years of recovery. In a four-hour interview with President Roosevelt, Currie was able to explain that the declared aim of balancing the budget "to restore business confidence" had damaged the economy. This was part of the "struggle for the soul of FDR" between the cautious Morgenthau and the expansionist Eccles. In April 1938, President Roosevelt asked Congress for major appropriations for spending on relief and public works. In May 1939, the rationale was explained in theoretical and statistical detail by Currie ("Mr. Inside") and by Harvard's Alvin Hansen ("Mr. Outside") in testimony before the Temporary National Economic Committee to highlight the role of government deficits in the recovery process.

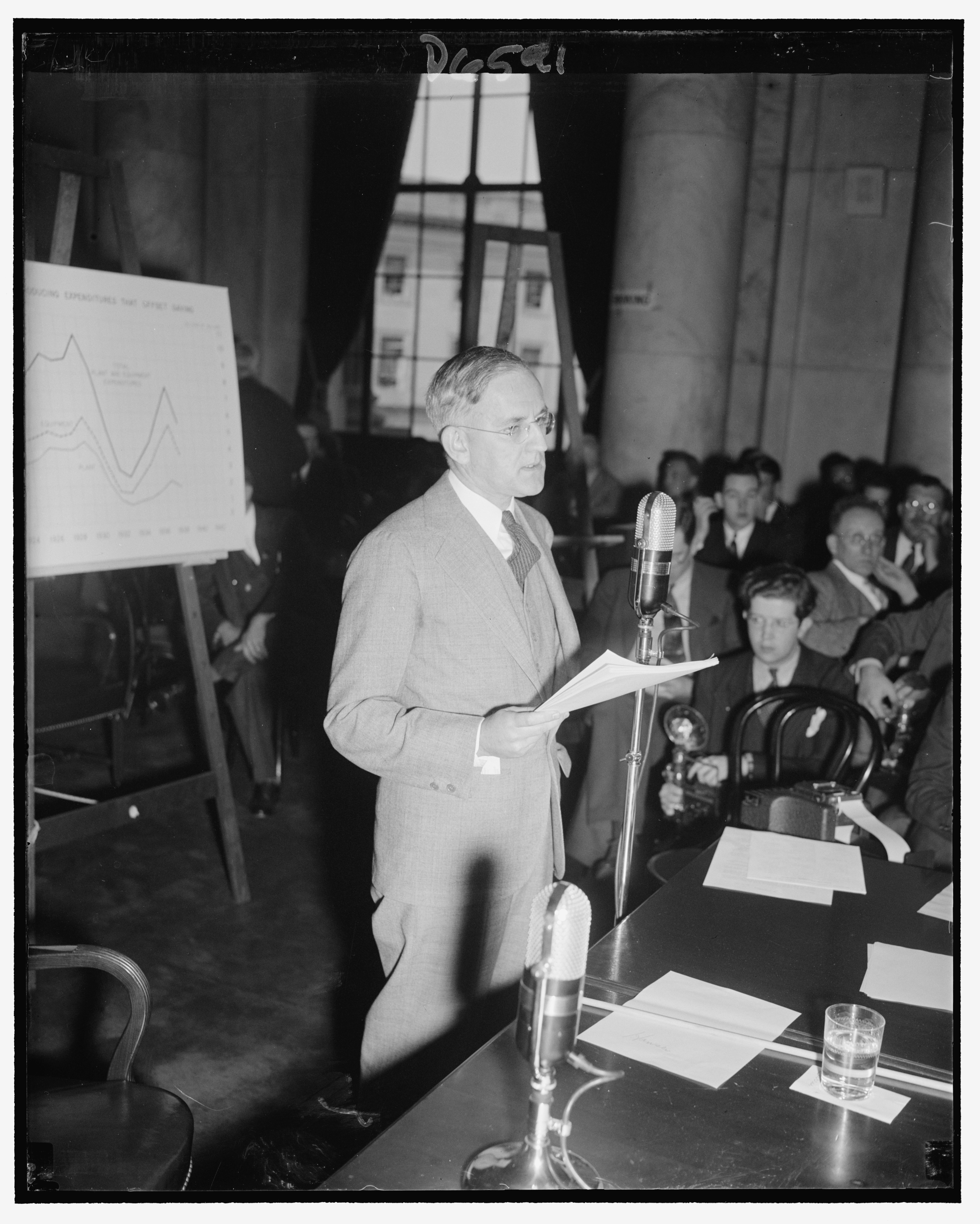
Currie, 1939.

== White House ==
Currie was appointed special advisor on economic affairs to the White House in July 1939 and gave counsel on taxation, social security, and the acceleration of peacetime and wartime production plans until the end of the Roosevelt administration. In January 1941, he was sent to China for discussions with Generalissimo Chiang Kai-shek (representing the Kuomintang) and Zhou Enlai (representing the Chinese Communist Party) in the Chinese wartime capital of Chongqing. In an effort to preserve the appearance of U.S. neutrality in the Second Sino-Japanese War, the Chinese government paid Currie's expenses and government salary. He recommended that China be added to Lend-Lease upon his return in March, and he was put in charge of this program's administration under the overall direction of President's Roosevelt's chief foreign policy advisor Harry Hopkins.

Currie was also assigned to expedite the Flying Tigers, a voluntary unit of U.S. military pilots released for combat duty on behalf of China against Japan and technically part of the Chinese Air Force under the command of Claire Lee Chennault (Currie also organized a large training program in the U.S. for Chinese pilots). In May 1941, he presented a paper on Chinese aircraft requirements to General George C. Marshall and the Joint Board, which they accepted. This paper stressed the role that an air force in China could play in defending Singapore, the Burma Road, and the Philippines against Japanese attack, as well as the potential for strategic bombing of targets in Japan. These activities, together with his efforts to tighten economic sanctions against Japan, are said to have been partially responsible for provoking Japan's attack on Pearl Harbor.

Currie returned to Chongqing in July 1942 to try to ease strained relations between Chiang Kai-shek and General Joseph Stilwell, commander of American military forces in China. Currie was one of several presidential envoys who recommended Stilwell's recall, but General Marshall refused to do so until October 1944. He also appears to have been involved in carrying out orders from President Roosevelt to get American intelligence services to return Soviet cryptographic documents and cease decoding operations, so as not to upset a wartime ally.

From 1943 to 1944, Currie served as Deputy Chief of the Foreign Economic Administration, where he recruited or recommended economists and others throughout the federal sector. Prominent examples include John Kenneth Galbraith, Richard Gilbert, Adlai Stevenson, and William O'Dwyer. Currie was a founding member of the War Agencies Employees Protective Association (created to help civilian federal employees acquire life insurance while serving in warzones) while at the FEA and served as WAEPA's first president from May 1943 until his retirement in June 1945.

From 1944 to 1945, Currie was involved in loan negotiations between the U.S. and its British and Soviet allies and in preparations for the 1944 Bretton Woods conference (staged mainly by Harry White), which led to the creation of the International Monetary Fund and the World Bank. In early 1945, Currie headed a tripartite (U.S., British, and French) mission to Bern to persuade the Swiss government to freeze Nazi bank accounts and stop further shipments of German supplies through Switzerland to the Italian front.

== Espionage allegations ==
Currie was identified as a Soviet agent by Soviet defector Whittaker Chambers in a 1939 meeting with Assistant Secretary of State for Latin American Affairs Adolf A. Berle, and the Federal Bureau of Investigation opened a file on Currie. Currie allegedly informed Soviet contacts in the spring of 1944 that the Venona project was about to break the Soviet signals code, and he was one of those blamed after the war for losing China to the control of Communists.

Elizabeth Bentley, another Soviet defector, testified before the House Committee on Un-American Activities in August 1948 and named Currie and Harry Dexter White as part of the Silvermaster spy network. Although she had never met them in person, she stated that she had received information through cutouts (couriers), who were other Washington economists later determined to be Soviet agents. White and Currie responded by asking to appear before the committee to rebut her charges, and did so later that month. White died three days later due to a serious heart condition, and he was later confirmed to be a source of Soviet intelligence in Venona intercepts and the notes of NKVD official Gaik Ovakimian. Currie was never charged or prosecuted with a crime.

In July 1949, Currie was awarded an International Bank for Reconstruction and Development contract to lead their first comprehensive survey mission—to Colombia. After his report was published in September 1950, he was contracted by the Colombian government to return as an adviser to a commission established to implement this report's recommendations. This began a long relationship with the Colombian government, which also contracted him to lead a public administration mission and coordinate implementation of President Truman's Point Four Program and a United Nations technical assistance program. In December 1952, he returned to the U.S. to testify before a New York grand jury investigating Owen Lattimore's role in the publication of secret State Department documents in Amerasia magazine.

When Currie tried to renew his U.S. passport in 1954, he was refused on the grounds that he was now residing abroad and married to a Colombian woman (his second wife, Elvira Wiesner). However, he may have been identified by the then-secret Venona project, which had decrypted wartime Soviet cables where he was identified as a source of Soviet intelligence. He appears in these cables under the codename "PAGE" and in Soviet intelligence archives as "VIM".

Historians John Earl Haynes and Harvey Klehr, Allen Weinstein, and Christopher Andrew have concluded that Currie knew that he was a Soviet asset. Currie's biographer Roger J. Sandilands has agreed that Currie knew or was connected to individuals who turned out to be Soviet agents or their unwitting assets, but he has disagreed that the evidence is clear that Currie was himself an agent.

== Colombia ==
After a 1953 Colombian coup d'état, Currie took a sabbatical from economic advisory work and devoted himself to raising Holstein cattle on a farm outside Bogotá, where he cultivated the highest-yielding dairy herd in the country for three consecutive years. With the return of civilian government in 1958, President Alberto Lleras Camargo personally conferred Colombian citizenship upon Currie, and he returned to advisory work for Lleras then President Guillermo León Valencia. Currie's last book was on the role of economic advisors like himself in developing countries.

Between 1967 and 1971, Currie traveled abroad as a visiting professor at American, Canadian, and British universities: Michigan State University (1965), Simon Fraser University (1967–1968 and 1969–1971), the University of Glasgow (1968–1969), and the University of Oxford (1969). He returned permanently to Colombia in May 1971 at the behest of President Misael Pastrana Borrero to be the architect of a new "Plan of the Four Strategies" with a focus on urban housing and export diversification. New institutions created in support of this plan helped accelerate urbanization.

From 1971 to 1981, Currie was chief economist at the National Planning Department, followed by 12 years at the Institute of Savings and Housing until his death in 1993. In 1972, he established a unique index-linked housing finance system based on "units of constant purchasing power" for both savers and borrowers, which significantly boosted Colombia's growth. In 1976, he played a "major part" in the first United Nations Human Settlements Programme conference in Vancouver, and he elaborated on his "cities-within-the-city" urban design and financing proposals (including the public recapture of land's socially created "valorización" or "unearned land value increments" as cities grow) in Taming the Megalopolis. He was also a professor at the National University of Colombia, Javeriana University, and the University of the Andes.

In 1993, President César Gaviria awarded Currie the Order of Boyaca (Colombia's highest peacetime decoration) one day before Currie's death from a heart attack.

== Additional publications ==
Books

- A 1968 reissue of The Supply and Control of Money in the United States includes an essay on Currie's contribution to monetary theory by Karl Brunner. OCLC 310482019.
- Currie, Lauchlin (1961). Operación Colombia un programa nacional de desarrollo económico y social. Bogotá: Sociedad Colombiana de Economistas. OCLC 948842148.
- Currie, Lauchlin (1966). Accelerating Development: The Necessity and the Means. New York: McGraw-Hill. OCLC 330897.
- Currie, Lauchlin (1967). Obstacles to Development. East Lansing: Michigan State University Press. OCLC 188221.
- Larsson, Yngve Gustaf Rickard; Wolff, Peter de; Currie, Lauchlin (1967). Governmental Planning and Political Economy. Berkeley: Institute of Business and Economic Research, Institute of Governmental Studies, University of California, Berkeley. OCLC 873600.

Articles

- Currie, Lauchlin (1933). "Treatment of Credit in Contemporary Monetary Theory". Journal of Political Economy. 41 (1): 58–79. doi:10.1086/254429. JSTOR 1822874. S2CID 153891155.
- Currie, Lauchlin (1933). "Money, Gold, and Income in the United States, 1921-32". The Quarterly Journal of Economics. 48 (1): 77–95. doi:10.2307/1884797. JSTOR 1884797.
- Currie, Lauchlin (1935). "The Supply and Control of Money: A Reply to Dr. B. M. Anderson, Jr". The Quarterly Journal of Economics. 49 (4): 694–704. doi:10.2307/1885406. JSTOR 1885406.
- Currie, Lauchlin (1950). "Some Prerequisites for Success of the Point Four Program". The Annals of the American Academy of Political and Social Science. 270 (1): 102–108. doi:10.1177/000271625027000114. S2CID 145137878.
- Currie, Lauchlin (1975). "The Interrelations of Urban and National Economic Planning". Urban Studies. 12 (1): 37–46. Bibcode:1975UrbSt..12...37C. doi:10.1080/00420987520080031. JSTOR 43080826. S2CID 154280359.
- "Currie, Lauchlin Bernard". Federal Reserve Archival System for Economic Research. Federal Reserve Bank of St. Louis.

Archival collections

- Lauchlin B. Currie papers. Durham: David M. Rubenstein Rare Book and Manuscript Library, Duke University. OCLC 39100493.
