= Maritime Labor Board =

- MLB

Agency overview
- Formed: June 23, 1938
- Preceding agency: United States Maritime Commission
- Dissolved: February 14, 1942
- Jurisdiction: Federal government of the United States
- Headquarters: Washington, D.C.
- Agency executives: Robert W. Bruere of New York, Chairman; Dr. Louis Bloch of San Francisco, Member; Claude E. Seehorn of Denver, Member
- Parent agency: Executive Office of the President

The Maritime Labor Board (MLB) was an independent US government agency with responsibilities for mediating and researching US labor law in relation to labor disputes in the maritime industry. In 1941, its mediation function lapsed, after which it focused exclusively on research.

== History ==
=== Creation ===
The Maritime Labor Board (MLB) was created by an amendment on June 23, 1948 (52 Stat. 968) to the Merchant Marine Act (49 Stat. 1985) of June 29, 1936.

=== Operations ===
The MLB began with two major functions. First, it mediated labor disputes within the maritime industry. Second, it conducted research on maritime labor problems.

From its founding to June 30, 1941, the MLB became involved in 118 disputes, advised 40 disputes, and observed 37 disputes. The Sailors' Union of the Pacific refused to deal with it at all; the National Maritime Union (NMU) would deal with it. Walter Galenson pronounced the MLB "unsuccessful" in 1960.

=== Devolution ===
On June 23, 1941, an amendment (55 Stat. 259) to the Merchant Marine Act of 1936 let the MLB's mediation functions lapse. From then on, it focused only as a research agency.

=== Closure ===
On February 14 (or 15), 1942, the MLB ceased operations due to exhaustion of appropriations. Three days later, its files went to the National Archives.

The Conciliation Service of the National Defense Mediation Board succeeded the MLB.

On May 24, 1950, President Harry S. Truman abolished the U.S. Maritime Commission, replaced by the Maritime Administration.

== Members ==
=== Board Members ===
In July 1938, the MLB's board included:

- Robert W. Bruere of New York (chairman)
- Dr. Louis Bloch of San Francisco (member)
- Claude E. Seehorn of Denver (member)

=== Staff members ===
From 1938 to 1940, Nathan Gregory Silvermaster was a staff member: he ran the Silvermaster Group under Soviet spy Elizabeth Bentley.

== See also ==
- United States Maritime Commission
- Maritime Administration
- US labor law
- National Labor Relations Board
- Federal Labor Relations Authority
- Federal Mediation and Conciliation Service (United States)
- Union organizer

== External sources ==
- Caroline W. Hiatt; Salvatore D. Nerboso, eds. (1949). Preliminary Inventory of the Records of the Maritime Labor Board. Preliminary Report No. 20. National Archives.
- Maritime Labor Board: Hearings Before a Subcommittee of the Committee on Commerce, United States Senate, Seventy-seventh Congress, First Session, on H.R. 4107, an Act to Extend for Two Years the Provisions of Title X of the Merchant Marine Act, 1936, as Amended May 13 and 14, 1941. National Archives. 1941.
- "First meeting of the maritime labor board (photo)". U.S. Senate Committee on Commerce.
- Government Accounting Office: B-9707, JUNE 7, 1940, 19 COMP. GEN. 977
