= Abraham George Silverman =

American scientist

Abraham George Silverman (1900–1973) was a mathematician and statistician who was a member of the Soviet Ware Group.

== Biography ==
Silverman graduated from Harvard University.

In the early days of President Franklin D. Roosevelt's New Deal, he worked for the Railroad Retirement Board in Washington, D.C., as director of research. From there he found employment in the Federal Coordinator of Transport, the United States Tariff Commission and the Labor Advisory Board of the National Recovery Administration. During World War II, Silverman was a civilian economic adviser and Chief of Analysis and Plans to the Assistant Chief of the Army Air Forces Air Staff for Material and Services Division, assigned to the Pentagon.

Silverman allegedly supplied documents from the Pentagon to the Silvermaster group of Soviet spies. Silverman knew Greg Silvermaster to be a conduit for Communist Party USA General secretary, Earl Browder.

In 1941, Silverman was on loan to the US Treasury Department and worked for a period of time on the frozen funds policy. Assistant Secretary of the United States Treasury Harry Dexter White used Silverman to supply documents to Soviet intelligence in the latter part of 1942 and early 1943. Presidential Assistant Lauchlin Currie furnished Silverman with oral information, including information that the United States was on the verge of breaking Soviet codes. Irving Kaplan of the War Production Board was also giving Silverman information to be transmitted to the Soviet Union. As the war progressed, the volume of material increased. Silverman worked closely with Lud Ullman, who also worked at the Pentagon and did the photographing of stolen documents prior to being turned over to the Golos network.

In August 1945 Silverman left the Pentagon to work for the French Supply Council in Washington D.C., an office of the new French government.

Silverman and Silvermaster learned much about U.S. policies and about Lauchlin Currie and Harry Dexter White's own views through their association. Currie appears to have been involved in carrying out orders from President Roosevelt to get U.S. intelligence services to return Soviet cryptographic documents to the Soviet Union and to cease decoding operations.

The code name "Aileron" appears in the Venona project and was identified as Silverman. Aileron was possibly a reference to Silverman’s Air Force position.

== See also ==
- Ware Group
- Whittaker Chambers
