= Grigory Kheifets =

Soviet intelligence officer (1899–1981)

Grigory Markovich Kheifets, also known as Grigori Kheifetz (1899–1981), was a Soviet intelligence officer, a lieutenant colonel of the NKVD-MGB. He was one of the principals in Soviet nuclear espionage. From December 1941 until July 1944, he was the San Francisco Soviet intelligence station chief or Rezident.

== Early life ==
Grigory Markovich (Girsh Mendelevich) Kheifets (Григорий Маркович Хейфец) was born on May 7, 1899, in Dvinsk, Latvia to tradesman Mendel Yankelevich Kheifets and Tsivya Abramovna Leyvy. The family soon moved to Riga, where his father worked in a printing shop and was a prominent member of the Bund. Grigory joined the Bund in 1915. The same year the authorities banished the family from Riga.

In 1917, Kheifets graduated from a vocational school in Bogorodsk, near Moscow. He studied politics and economics at Communist University. In 1919, he joined the Bolshevik party and, from 1919-1920, fought in the Red Army in the Russian Civil War on the Western Front and the Caucasus, where he was lightly injured in his arm. After the war, he briefly served as secretary to Lenin's wife Nadezhda Krupskaya

== Career prior to the Second World War ==
In 1921 Kheifets joined the Comintern as an agent of the OMS under diplomatic cover. In 1924, he was OMS’s rezident in Latvia, posing as a Soviet consular agent, and, from April 1925, in Constantinople under cover of Consul General. From 1927-1929 he was an OMS emissary in China, Germany, Austria, France, and other countries. While working illegally under the guise of a student from India, he received an engineering degree from Jena Polytechnic, Germany, where he established several underground cells. From April 1927, he was the OMS representative in Shanghai, and, from 1928, in Berlin. In February 1929, he returned to Moscow to become Executive Secretary of the “Ogonyok” publishing house, then Managing Editor of the “Inventor” magazine. Since June 1931 he was on undercover assignments in France and the United States. Upon returning to the USSR in October 1935, he became the assistant section head of NKVD INO (intelligence).

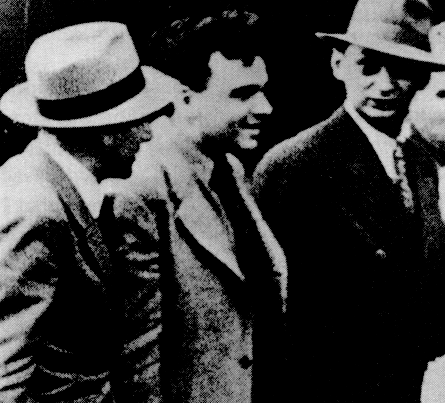
A surveillance photograph was taken by Manhattan Project security officials. On the right is Grigory Kheifets, the NKVD Resident in San Francisco from 1941 to July 1944. On the left is his successor, Gregory Kasparov. In between them is Martin Kamen, a chemist at the University of California, Berkeley's Radiation Lab. The photo is courtesy of the National Security Agency.

Since July 1936 Kheifets was a resident in Italy, where he recruited the young physicist Bruno Pontecorvo. In the summer of 1938, he was recalled to Moscow, dismissed from the NKVD, and appointed deputy chairman of VOKS, an international cultural exchange organization.

== San Francisco station ==
In October 1941, Kheifets was reinstated in NKVD, and from November 1941 he was the NKVD station chief in San Francisco under the guise of the Soviet Vice Consul. There he launched work on intelligence support for the Soviet nuclear project. According to the former Soviet head of intelligence Pavel Sudoplatov, Kheifets established confidential contact with J. Robert Oppenheimer, the scientific director of the Manhattan Project. In his attempts to recruit Oppenheimer he relied on two female agents, Elizabeth Zarubina and Louise Bransten; the latter was rumored to be his lover.

However, the extent of Oppenheimer's cooperation with Kheifets later became the subject of much disagreement among historians. The unsuccessful attempt to recruit Oppenheimer is known as the "Haakon Chevalier affair."

In November 1944, Kheifets was recalled to Moscow. Since December 1944, he was a senior analyst and then headed a section in the 1st Directorate (intelligence) of the NKGB. Beginning in May 1946, Kheifets served as head of Department "C" (atomic intelligence) of the Ministry of State Security of the USSR.

== HUAC Hearings ==
During the House Un-American Activities Committee hearings, the investigators invoked Kheifets's name several times, probing his contacts in Hollywood, including Bertolt Brecht, Paul Robeson, and others.

== California in the Crimea ==
In 1943 a world-famous actor of the Moscow Yiddish State Art Theater, Solomon Mikhoels, together with the poet Itzik Feffer, toured the United States on behalf of the Soviet Jewish Antifascist Committee (JAC). Their assignment was to raise money and convince American public opinion that Soviet anti-Semitism had been crushed due to Joseph Stalin's policies. Kheifets coordinated the tour. Before their departure, NKVD Chief Lavrenti Beria instructed Mikhoels and Feffer to emphasize the outstanding contribution of Jews to science and culture in the Soviet Union.

In 1944 and the first half of 1945, Stalin developed a strategic plan to use the Jewish issue to bring in international investment to rebuild the war-torn Soviet Union and to influence the postwar realignment of power in the Middle East. To this end, the Soviet Union would set up a Jewish Soviet Republic in Crimea, dubbed "California in the Crimea," aiming to resettle the survivors of the Holocaust. The coordination and execution of the plan was entrusted to Kheifets. In 1947, he left the MGB and was appointed Deputy Executive Secretary of the JAC in charge of international relations.

However, by 1948, Stalin lost interest in "California in the Crimea." The JAC was disbanded in November of that year, followed by the arrest and execution of most of its members.

== Arrest ==
On November 13, 1951, Kheifets was arrested in the JAC case. On February 2, 1953, he was sentenced to capital punishment. The sentence was stayed due to the death of Stalin and the investigation resumed on April 23, 1953. On December 28, 1953, he was released and fully rehabilitated. He died on retirement in Moscow in 1981.

== Family ==
• Wife - Maria Solomonovna Aleinikova (1900-1975), a graduate of Polotsk gymnasium for girls.

• Daughter - Cecilia Grigorievna Aleinikova-Kheifets (1922-2004), doctor-ophthalmologist, was married to the immunologist and virologist David Goldfarb (1918-1990).

• Grandson - Alex Goldfarb (1947 - ), biochemist and activist.

• Granddaughter - Olga Goldfarb (1952 - ), pediatrician.

- Uncle - Abraham Kheifets (a.k.a. August Guralsky), a Comintern official.

== See also ==
- Isaac Folkoff
