= Isaac Folkoff =

American communist (1881–1975)

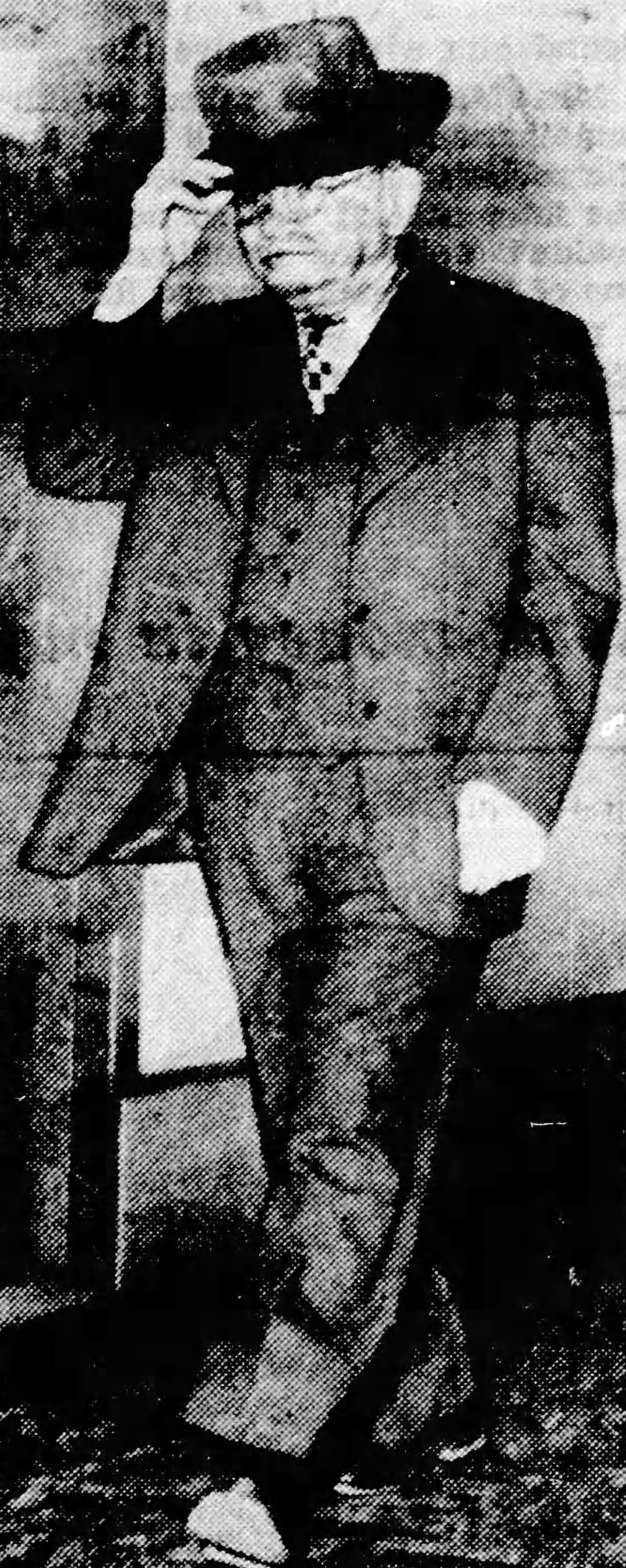
- Folkoff in 1950
- Born: Izak Falkov; 1881; Ludza, Vitebsk Governorate, Russian Empire
- Died: March 27, 1975 (aged 93–94); San Francisco, California, U.S.
- Spouse(s): Minnie, Annie
- Children: Minnie Folkoff
- Parent(s): Falk Falkov, Leah Rappaport
- Espionage activity
- Allegiance: Soviet Union
- Codename: Uncle
- Codename: Pop
- Other work: Helped found the Communist Party of California

Isaac "Pop" Folkoff (also known as "Volkov", "Folconoff", and "Uncle"; 1881 – March 27, 1975), was a senior founding member of the Communist Party of California and West Coast liaison between Soviet intelligence and the Communist Party USA (CPUSA).

== Biography ==
Folkoff was born in 1881, in Ludza. In 1904, he arrived San Francisco, where he ran an embroidery business.

He helped found the California Communist Party and had gone as a delegate for the founding of the Communist International ("Comintern") in Moscow in 1919.

He was in charge of West Coast operations. He worked as a courier passing information to and from Soviet sources, and as a talent spotter and vetter of potential espionage recruits. He also worked as a Case Officer. His code name in Soviet intelligence and in the Venona files was "Uncle".

Notes taken in 1939 by Adolph Berle show that Whittaker Chambers told him:

West Coast-Head : "The Old Man"-Volkov is his real name - daughter a Comintern courier. He knows the West Coast underground-Residence: San Francisco or Oakland

When Grigory Markovich Kheifitz, formerly personal secretary to Lenin's wife Nadezhda Krupskaya, came to San Francisco in 1941, he began meeting with Folkoff to develop information and recruit intelligence workers among American Communists.

== Venona ==
According to the National Security Agency, Folkoff appears in several Venona descripts as "Uncle":

- April 18, 1945: "Uncle told us..."
- May 18, 1945: "According to information from Uncle..."

== See also ==
- Whittaker Chambers
- Grigory Markovich Kheifitz
- James Walter Miller

== Sources ==
- Chambers, Whittaker (1952). Witness. New York: Random House. p. 468. LCCN 52005149.
- John Earl Haynes and Harvey Klehr, Venona: Decoding Soviet Espionage in America (New Haven: Yale University Press, 1999), pgs. 234, 235, 239. ISBN 0-300-08462-5
