= Soviet espionage in the United States =

Espionage against the United States by Soviet intelligence agencies

As early as the 1920s, the Soviet Union, through its GRU, OGPU, NKVD, and KGB intelligence agencies, used Russian and foreign-born nationals (resident spies), as well as Communists of American origin, to perform espionage activities in the United States, forming various spy rings. Particularly during the 1940s, some of these espionage networks had contact with various U.S. government agencies. These Soviet espionage networks illegally transmitted confidential information to Moscow, such as information on the development of the atomic bomb (see atomic spies). Soviet spies also participated in propaganda and disinformation operations, known as active measures, and attempted to sabotage diplomatic relationships between the U.S. and its allies.

== First efforts ==
During the 1920s Soviet intelligence focused on military and industrial espionage in Britain, France, Germany, and the United States, specifically in the aircraft and munitions industries, in order to industrialize and compete with Western powers, as well as strengthening the Soviet armed forces. The United States opened diplomatic ties to the Soviet Union in 1933, normalizing relations, but also opening the door to a number of spies which initially focused on technological espionage. One early Soviet spy was Jones Orin York who was recruited by the KGB's predecessors in 1935. The Soviets' Amtorg Trading Corporation established in 1924 would become a nexus of espionage.

Historian Harvey Klehr describes that the American businessman Armand Hammer "met Lenin in 1921 and, in return for a concession to manufacture pencils, agreed to launder Soviet money to benefit communist parties in Europe and America." Historian Edward Jay Epstein noted that "Hammer received extraordinary treatment from Moscow in many ways. He was permitted by the Soviet Government to take millions of dollars' worth of czarist art out of the country when he returned to the United States in 1932." According to journalist Alan Farnham, "Over the decades Hammer continued traveling to Russia, hobnobbing with its leaders to the point that both the CIA and the FBI suspected him of being a full-fledged agent."

== Browder and Golos networks ==
Earl Browder, General Secretary of the Communist Party of the United States (CPUSA), served as an agent recruiter himself on behalf of Soviet intelligence. Browder later stated that "by the mid-thirties, the Party was not putting its principal emphasis on recruiting members." Left unstated was his intent to use party members for espionage work, where suitable. Browder advocated the use of a United Front involving other members of the left, both to strengthen advocacy of pro-Soviet policy and to enlarge the pool of potential recruits for espionage work. The illegal residency of NKVD in the US was established in 1934 by the former Berlin resident Boris Bazarov. In 1935, NKVD agent Iskhak Akhmerov entered the US with false identity papers to assist Bazarov in the collection of useful intelligence, and operated without interruption until 1939, when he left the US. Akhmerov's wife, an American who worked for Soviet intelligence, was Helen Lowry (Elza Akhmerova), the niece of CPUSA General Secretary Earl Browder. Information from Soviet archives has revealed that Browder's younger sister Marguerite worked until 1938 as an NKVD operative in Europe. She discontinued this work only when Browder himself requested her release from duty, fearful that her work would compromise his position as General Secretary.

In the 1930s, the chief Soviet espionage organization operating in the U.S. became the GRU. J. Peters headed the secret apparatus that supplied internal government documents from the Ware group to the GRU. Browder assisted Peters in building a network of operatives in the administration of President Franklin D. Roosevelt. This group included Alger Hiss, John Abt, and Lee Pressman (Pressman admitted participation in the group, but denied it was involved in espionage). Courier for the group at the time was Whittaker Chambers. Browder oversaw the efforts of Jacob Golos and his girlfriend, Elizabeth Bentley, whose network of agents and sources included two key figures at the Department of Treasury, Nathan Gregory Silvermaster and Harry Dexter White.

One early Soviet spy ring was headed by Jacob Golos. Jake Golos (birth name Jacob Golosenko, Tasin, Rasin or Raisen) was a Ukrainian-born Bolshevik revolutionary and Soviet secret police (NKVD) operative in the USSR. He was also a longtime senior official of the CPUSA involved in covert work and cooperation with Soviet intelligence agencies. He took over an existing network of agents and intelligence sources from Earl Browder. Golos' controller was the head of the NKVD's American desk, Gaik Ovakimian, also known as "The Puppetmaster", who would later serve a key role in the assassination of Leon Trotsky. Golos was the "main pillar" of the NKVD intelligence network. He had worked with Soviet intelligence from the mid-1930s, and probably earlier. He was not merely a CPUSA official assisting the NKVD (an agent or "probationer" in Soviet intelligence parlance) but held official rank in the NKVD, and claimed to be an oldtime Chekist.

Golos established a company called World Tourists with money from Earl Browder, the General Secretary. The firm, which posed as a travel agency, was used to facilitate international travel to and from the United States by Soviet agents and CPUSA members. World Tourists was also involved in manufacturing fake passports, as Browder used such a false passport on covert trips to the Soviet Union in 1936. At World Tourist, Golos frequently met Bernard Schuster, an NKVD agent (code name ECHO and DICK) and Communist Party functionary who carried out background investigations for Golos as part of the vetting process of agent candidates. In March 1940, Golos pleaded guilty to being an unregistered foreign agent, paid a $500 fine (equivalent to $11,000 today), and served probation in lieu of a four-month prison sentence.

Soviet intelligence did not like Golos' refusal to allow Soviet contact with his sources (a measure implemented by Golos to protect himself and to ensure his continued retention by the NKVD). The NKVD suspected Golos of Trotskyism and tried to lure him to Moscow, where he could be arrested, but the US government got to him first. But even then, he did not reveal his agent network. After Browder went to prison in 1940, Golos took over running Browder's agents. In 1941, Golos set up a commercial forwarding enterprise, called the US Shipping and Service Corporation, with Elizabeth Bentley, his lover, as one of its officers.

Sometime in November 1943, Golos met in New York City with key figures of the Perlo group, a group working in several government departments and agencies in Washington, D.C. The group was already in the service of Browder. Later that same month, after a series of heart attacks over the previous two years, Golos died in bed in Bentley's arms. Bentley then took over his operations (thus the reference in the decrypts to him as a "former" colleague).

== Secret apparatus ==
By the end of 1936 at least four mid-level State Department officials were delivering information to Soviet intelligence: Alger Hiss, assistant to Assistant Secretary of State Francis Sayre; Julian Wadleigh, economist in the Trade Agreements Section; Laurence Duggan, Latin American division; and Noel Field, West European division. Whittaker Chambers later testified that the plans for a tank design with a revolutionary new suspension invented by J. Walter Christie (then being tested in the U.S.A.) were procured and put into production in the Soviet Union as the Mark BT, later developed into the famous Soviet T-34 tank.

In 1993, experts from the Library of Congress traveled to Moscow to copy previously secret archives of Communist Party USA (CPUSA) records, sent to the Soviet Union for safekeeping by party organizers. The records provide an irrefutable record of Soviet intelligence and cooperation provided by those in the radical left in the United States from the 1920s through the 1940s. Some documents revealed that the CPUSA was actively involved in secretly recruiting party members from African-American groups and rural farm workers. The records contained further evidence that Soviet sympathizers had indeed infiltrated the State Department, beginning in the 1930s. Included were letters from two U.S. ambassadors in Europe to President Franklin D. Roosevelt and a senior State Department official. Thanks to an official in the State department sympathetic to the Party, the confidential correspondence, concerning political and economic matters in Europe, ended up in the hands of Soviet intelligence.

In the late 1930s and 1940, Soviet intelligence had multiple staging areas for plots to murder exiled Russian revolutionary Leon Trotsky, then living in Mexico City. Josef Grigulevich, an NKVD agent who had direct orders from Stalin to kill Trotsky, had a safe house in Zook's Drugstore in Santa Fe, New Mexico. The Soviets had two plans to assassinate Trotsky, one involving the Mexican Stalinist David Siqueiros, and the other the Spanish Ramón Mercader. One account of the first, failed raid on Trotsky's home states that Grigulevich tricked Robert Sheldon Harte, an American Communist who was Trotsky's bodyguard, into opening the gate. The Soviets failed to kill Trotsky during this attempt, but betrayed Harte, and they killed him for being a witness. Siqueiros then escaped to Chile with the help of Pablo Neruda. Grigulevich likely then crossed the border north and took refuge at Zook's Pharmacy. The second later attempt by Mercader was successful and Trotsky was murdered in Mexico.

== Soblen spy ring ==
Jacob Albam and the Sobles (Jack and Myra) were indicted on espionage charges by the FBI in 1957; all three were later convicted and served prison terms. Alleged members of their spy ring, the Zlatovskis, remained in Paris, France, where the laws did not allow their extradition to the United States for espionage. Robert Soblen was sentenced to life in prison for his espionage work at Sandia National Laboratories, but jumped bail and escaped to Israel. After being expelled from that country, he later committed suicide in Great Britain while awaiting extradition back to the United States.

Boris Morros, formerly a Soviet spy, became an FBI counterspy and reported on the Soble spy ring.

== Wartime espionage ==
During the Second World War, Soviet espionage agents obtained classified reports on electronic advances in radio-beacon artillery fuzes by Emerson Radio, including a complete proximity fuze (reportedly the same fuze design that was later installed on Soviet anti-aircraft missiles to shoot down Francis Gary Powers's U-2 in 1960). Thousands of documents from the National Advisory Committee for Aeronautics (NACA) were photocopied or stolen, including a complete set of design and production drawings for Lockheed Aircraft's new P-80 Shooting Star fighter jet.

According to Soviet agent Pavel Sudoplatov, five spy rings for the Soviet Union were targeting the United States during World War II: one was based in Amtorg in New York City, another spy ring was based in the Soviet Embassy in the United States at Washington, D.C., another was based in the Soviet Consulate General in San Francisco, another was based out of Mexico City and ran by Vasilevsky, and the fifth was the Akhmerov led ring which targeted United States Communist Party members for the Kremlin's needs.

=== Atomic bomb secrets ===
Joseph Stalin directed Soviet intelligence officers to collect information in four main areas. Pavel Fitin, the 34-year-old chief of the KGB First Directorate, was directed to seek American intelligence concerning Hitler's plans for the war in Russia; secret war aims of London and Washington, particularly with regard to planning for Operation Overlord, the second front in Europe; any indications the Western Allies might be willing to make a separate peace with Hitler; and American scientific and technological progress, particularly in the development of an atomic weapon. Pavel Sudoplatov claimed to have led the efforts to obtain information about the Manhattan Project in an alleged "Department S" but this has been questioned because Sudoplatov made false accusations about Oppenheimer and others.

A well-known Soviet case was of Julius and Ethel Rosenberg, the first US citizens convicted and executed for espionage during peacetime. The married couple lived in New York City and were accused of spying for the Soviet Union and sending information regarding radar, sonar, jet propulsion engines, and sending nuclear weapon designs. Following the Moynihan Commission, the declassification of the Venona project in 1995 revealed more information about the Julius and Ethel Rosenberg case, and confirmed that a widespread Soviet spy network did exist during the Cold War. However, many agents were never prosecuted or publicly implicated, for instance Theodore Hall, because much Venona evidence was withheld until 1995.

During this time, George Koval who infiltrated the Manhattan Project as a member of the GRU, also passed stolen atomic secrets to the Soviet Union. Harry Gold and Klaus Fuchs were also Soviet spies. Harry Gold was a courier for other Soviet spies such as Klaus Fuchs.

=== Silvermaster spy ring ===
The United States Treasury Department was successfully penetrated by nearly a dozen Soviet agents or information sources, including Harold Glasser and his superior, Harry Dexter White, assistant secretary of the treasury and the second most influential official in the department. In late May 1941, Vitali Pavlov, a 25-year-old NKVD officer, approached White and attempted to secure his assistance to influence U.S. policy towards Japan. Pavlov's memoirs, after decades of being in the KGB, alleged that White agreed to assist Soviet intelligence in any way he could. Whittaker Chambers states White's principal function was aiding the infiltration and placement of Soviet operatives within the government, and protecting sources. When security concerns arose around Nathan Gregory Silvermaster, White protected him in his sensitive position at the Board of Economic Warfare. White likewise was a purveyor of information and resources to assist Soviet aims, and agreed to press for the release of German occupation currency plates to the Soviet Union. The Soviets later used the plates to print unrestricted sums of money to exchange for U.S. and Allied hard goods.

In August 1945, Elizabeth Bentley, fearful of assassination by the Soviet MGB, turned herself in to the government. She implicated many agents and sources in the Golos and Silvermaster spy networks, and was the first to accuse Harry Dexter White of acting on behalf of Soviet interests in releasing occupation plates to Moscow, later confirmed by Soviet archives and former KGB officers. U.S. counterintelligence archives in the Venona project contain "damning evidence" against White—showing evidence for his inappropriate contacts with Soviet agents.

In a twist of history, Harry Dexter White would participate in the Bretton Woods Conference, which created the American-led, post-war financial and economic order. Although White was sympathetic to the Soviet Union, he was still capitalist in his economic thinking, and there was only so much he could do to benefit the Soviet Union at a conference for liberal internationalism, an idea the Soviets opposed. Ultimately, the main result was that President Harry S. Truman would nominate a European to Managing Director of the IMF instead of Harry Dexter White. Dr. James C. Van Hook, joint historian of the Department of State and the Central Intelligence Agency, says "It is difficult to understand how White's detractors could characterize Bretton Woods, a fundamental institution of liberal capitalism, as inherently pro-Soviet."

=== Aftermath ===
President Truman's Executive Order 9835 of 22 March 1947 tightened protections against subversive infiltration of the US Government, defining disloyalty as membership on a list of subversive organizations maintained by the Attorney General. Truman, however, was opposed to the McCarran Internal Security Act of 1950, calling it a "Mockery of the Bill of Rights" and a "long step towards totalitarianism".

== Cold War espionage ==
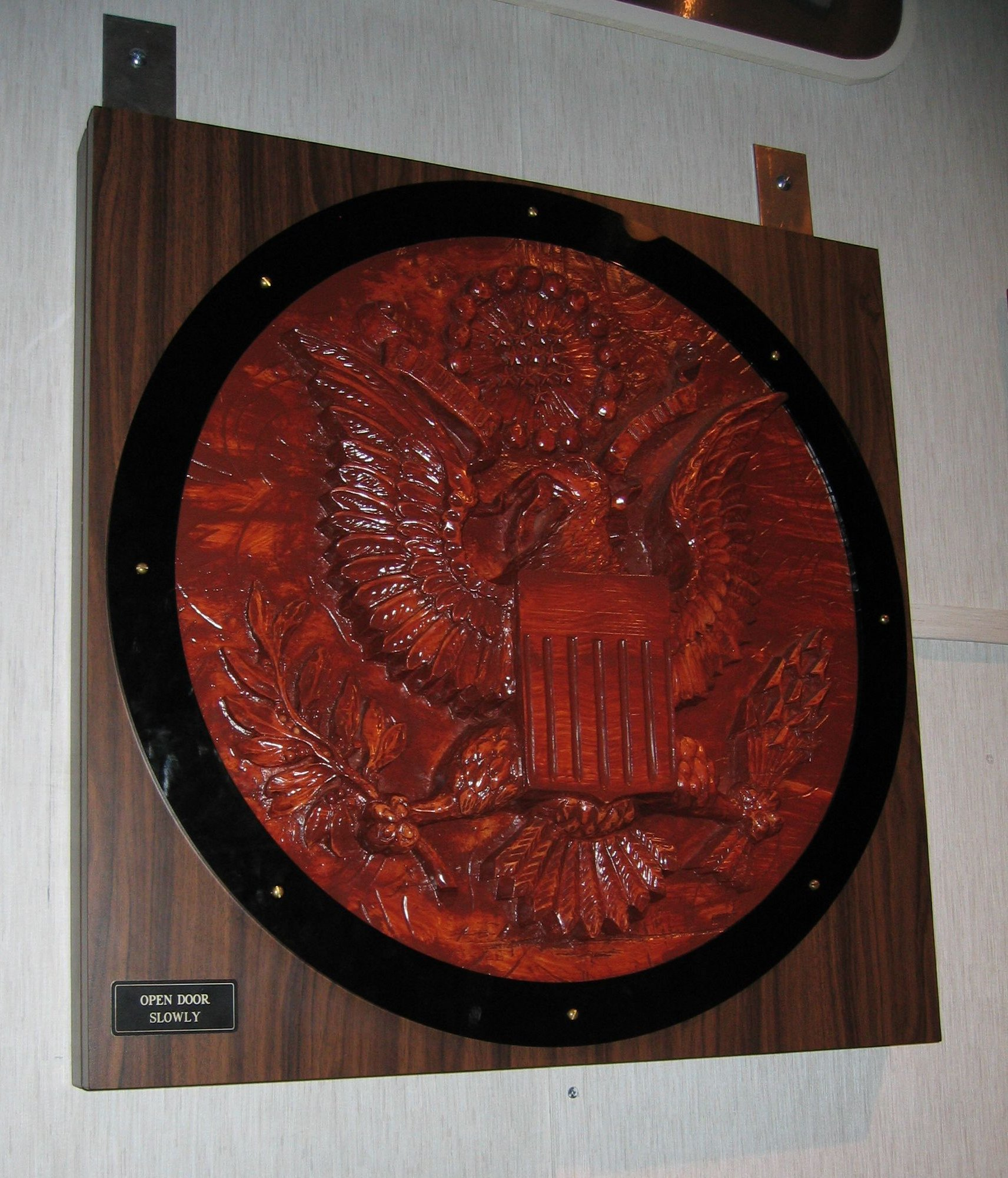
Replica of The Thing, which contained a Soviet bugging device, on display at the NSA's National Cryptologic Museum

Soviet espionage operations continued during the Cold War. The Venona project, declassified in 1995 by the Moynihan Commission, contained extensive evidence of the activities of Soviet spy networks in America.

On August 4, 1945, several weeks before the end of World War II, a delegation from the Young Pioneer Organization of the Soviet Union presented a bugged carving to Ambassador W. Averell Harriman, later known as The Thing, as a "gesture of friendship" to the Soviet Union's war ally. The device, embedded in a carved wooden plaque of the Great Seal of the United States, was used by the Soviet government to spy on the United States. It hung in the ambassador's Moscow residential study for seven years, until it was exposed in 1952 during the tenure of Ambassador George F. Kennan.

The Mitrokhin Archive showed that the Soviets did not just perform espionage in terms of gathering intelligence, but also used its intelligence agencies for "active measures" a form of political warfare involving forgeries and disinformation.

=== Communist Party USA ===
During the Second World War, the Communist Party USA was a center of Soviet espionage in the United States. After the war, this continued. Espionage historian John Earl Haynes states that the CPUSA was essentially a Soviet "fifth column", though "dried up as a base for Soviet espionage once the administration got serious about internal security".

The Communist Party USA received a substantial subsidy from the USSR from 1959 until 1989. Because the CPUSA consistently maintained a pro-Moscow line, many members left over time dissatisfied with events of Soviet repression, such as in Hungary in 1956 and in Czechoslovakia in 1968. The Soviet funding ended in 1989 when Gus Hall condemned the initiatives taken by Mikhail Gorbachev.

In 1952, Jack and Morris Childs—both American-born ex-Soviet spies—became FBI double agents, and informed on the CPUSA for the rest of the Cold War, monitoring the Soviet funding and communications with Moscow.

=== Spy motivations and Soviet recruitment techniques ===
According to longtime CIA officer Frederick Wettering, many turncoats to the Soviets were not ideologically communist, such as Aldrich Ames and John Walker who "did it strictly for the money." Wettering summarized the motivations as "MIRE -- money, ideology, revenge and ego."

According to Russian investigative writer, Andrei Soldatov:

In Soviet times, intelligence and counterintelligence branches of the KGB were closely interconnected. In addition to its espionage abroad, the KGB was always busy collecting “intelligence from the territory,” a euphemism for recruiting foreign nationals in the Soviet Union, with an eye to subsequently running them as agents in their home countries. Regional departments of the KGB were tasked with recruiting foreigners traveling throughout the country.

Former KGB defector Jack Barsky stated, "Many a right-wing radical had unknowingly given information to the Soviets (under a 'false flag'), thinking they were working with a Western ally, such as Israel, when in fact their contact was a KGB operative."

=== Cambridge Five ===
Notable cases of Cold War Soviet espionage included Kim Philby, a Soviet double agent and British intelligence liaison to American intelligence, who was revealed to be a member of the "Cambridge Five" spy ring in 1963. The other four members of the "Cambridge Five" spy ring included Donald Maclean, Guy Burgess, Anthony Blunt, and John Cairncross, although Michael Straight was also involved with the Soviet spy ring and there were possibly other alleged members. The Cambridge Spy Ring focused on serving the Soviet Union in the Cold War by infiltrating British intelligence and providing secret information to the Soviet top leaders, and causing mistrust in British intelligence in the United States.

Kim Philby, along with Bill Weisband, would end up betraying the existence of the Venona project to the Soviets, between 1945 and 1948.

=== Active measures ===
Active measures (Russian: активные мероприятия, romanized: aktivnye meropriyatiya) are a form of political warfare that was conducted by the Soviet Union. These ranged from simple propaganda and forgery of documents, to assassination, terrorist acts and planned sabotage operations. In the US the KGB's main active measures were disinformation and the spread of conspiracy theories.

Retired KGB Major General Oleg Kalugin, former Head of Foreign Counter Intelligence for the KGB (1973–1979), described active measures as "the heart and soul of Soviet intelligence":

"Not intelligence collection, but subversion: active measures to weaken the West, to drive wedges in the Western community alliances of all sorts, particularly NATO, to sow discord among allies, to weaken the United States in the eyes of the people of Europe, Asia, Africa, Latin America, and thus to prepare ground in case the war really occurs. To make America more vulnerable to the anger and distrust of other peoples."

The doctrine of active measures was taught in the Andropov Institute of the KGB situated at Foreign Intelligence Service (SVR) headquarters in Yasenevo District of Moscow. The head of the "active measures department" was Yuri Modin, former controller of the Cambridge Five spy ring.

One example of active measures by the KGB was Operation "Denver" (also nicknamed Operation INFEKTION), a propaganda campaign which fabricated and spread the idea HIV/AIDS was invented by the US as a biological weapon from Fort Detrick, Maryland. As part of the disinformation campaign the KGB, through affiliated Soviet press and Soviet bloc intelligence agencies, disseminated publications that claimed to be independent investigative work, such as the "Segal report" by Jakob Segal. Part of the goal was to shift attention away from the Soviets' own biological weapons program. In 1992, SVR head Yevgeny Primakov admitted that the KGB had instigated and perpetuated the myth of a manmade AIDS. The conspiracy theories fed into AIDS denialism and may have led to preventable deaths across the United States, and South Africa. According to the U.S. State Department, the Soviet Union used the campaign to undermine the United States' credibility, foster anti-Americanism, isolate America abroad, and create tensions between host countries and the U.S. over the presence of American military bases. A cycle of misinformation and disinformation revolved between Kremlin-based and U.S.-based conspiracy theorists (such as Lyndon LaRouche).

A series of Soviet active measures focused on exacerbating racial divisions in the United States. According to intelligence historian Christopher Andrew, "Martin Luther King was probably the only prominent American to be the target of active measures by both the FBI and the KGB." The FBI surveilled King and also tried to publicize adultery accusations against him, while posing as a former supporter. Meanwhile, the KGB tried but failed to influence MLK, Jr. through the CPUSA. Finding King not radical enough, the KGB sought to discredit him by portraying him as a supposed "Uncle Tom". After King's assassination, the KGB spread conspiracy theories about the government being involved in his murder. Following this, Yuri Andropov approved the forgery of anti-black pamphlets claiming to be from the Jewish Defense League. A more extensive sabotage plot was planned as "Operation PANDORA" but never implemented. The KGB later penned racist letters to appear as a Ku Klux Klan campaign against Olympic athletes from African and Asian countries to scare them from participating, ahead of the Soviets' 1984 Summer Olympics boycott.

=== Spy ring discoveries ===
Major spy discoveries occurred in the 1980s despite the looming end of the Cold War, The press dubbed 1985 the "Year of the Spy" due to the discovery of multiple spies and spy rings, many of them passing information to the Soviet Union, such as John Anthony Walker and Ronald Pelton. The New York Times reported in 1987 that the Walker spy ring was "described as the most damaging Soviet spy ring in history." During his time as a Soviet spy (1967-1985), Walker stole and sold codes that assisted the Soviets in deciphering encrypted Navy messages, which allowed them to monitor American naval assets. The Walker spy ring also compromised information about weapons, sensor data, and related naval tactics. Other 1980s spies included Aldrich Ames, a KGB mole. Investigation of Ames' activities led to the 1995 CIA disinformation controversy revealing that false reports were fed to the United States through Soviet Union double agents.

== See also ==
- American espionage in the Soviet Union and Russian Federation
- Amerasia
- Chinese espionage in the United States
- Farewell Dossier
- George Trofimoff
- Gouzenko Affair
- Hollow Nickel Case
- List of Americans in the Venona papers
- List of Eastern Bloc agents in the United States
- Nuclear espionage
- Russian interference in the 2016 United States elections
- Russian involvement in regime change
- Russian Soviet Government Bureau
