= List of people from Bloomington, Illinois =

The following list includes notable people who were born or have lived in Bloomington, Illinois. For a similar list organized alphabetically by last name, see the category page People from Bloomington, Illinois.

== Academics and writing ==
Name	Image	Birth	Death	Known for	Association	Reference
Kate Charles		1950		Mystery writer		
Lura Eyestone		Oct 14, 1872	Mar 9, 1965	Educator	Born in Bloomington	
Frederic W. Goudy		Mar 8, 1865	May 11, 1947	Typographer	Born in Bloomington	
Elbert Hubbard		Jun 19, 1856	May 7, 1915	Essayist	Born in Bloomington	
John Wesley Powell		Mar 24, 1834	Sep 23, 1902	Naturalist	Professor at Illinois Wesleyan University prior to first western expedition	
Harold Sinclair		May 8, 1907	May 24, 1966	Novelist, jazz musician	Born in Chicago, lived in Bloomington since age 8	
Wilson Tucker		Nov 23, 1914	Oct 6, 2006	Author		
Curtis White				Author, novelist, essayist, and theorist		

== Business and engineering ==
Name	Image	Birth	Death	Known for	Association	Reference
George J. Mecherle		Jun 7, 1877	Mar 10, 1951	Founder of State Farm Insurance	Lived and died in Bloomington	
Marc W. Miller		1947		Award-winning game designer	Lives in Bloomington	
Verne Winchell		Oct 30, 1915	Nov 26, 2002	Founder of Winchell's Donuts	Born in Bloomington	

== Media and arts ==
Name	Image	Birth	Death	Known for	Association	Reference
Wally Bishop		Aug 17, 1905	Jan 15, 1982	Cartoonist	Grew up in Bloomington	
Tim Bradstreet		Feb 16, 1967		Eisner Award-nominated artist and illustrator	Graduated BHS, Class of 1985	
David S. Broder		Sep 11, 1929	Mar 9, 2011	Pulitzer Prize-winning Washington Post journalist	Worked for Pantagraph newspaper in Bloomington	
John Campbell		Jul 7, 1955		Jazz pianist	Born in Bloomington	
Rachel Crothers		Dec 12, 1870	Jul 5, 1958	Playwright	Born in Bloomington	
Steve George		May 20, 1955		Musician and keyboardist of the pop band Mr. Mister	Born in Bloomington	
Joel Higgins		Sep 28, 1943		Actor (Edward W. Stratton, III on Silver Spoons)	Born in Bloomington	
Pokey LaFarge		June 26, 1983		Musician and songwriter focusing on the American roots genre	Born in Bloomington	
Britt Lower		Aug 2, 1985		Actress	Born in Bloomington	
Cleo Madison		Mar 26, 1883	Mar 11, 1964	Silent-film actress and director	Born in Bloomington	
Kathleen McClellan		Apr 28, 1970		Actress, former Miss Illinois Teen USA in 1988	Grew up in Bloomington	
Pawnee Bill		Feb 14, 1860	Feb 3, 1942	Wild West showman	Born in Bloomington	
Frederic Remington		Oct 4, 1861	Dec 26, 1909	Artist and sculptor of the Old West	Lived in Bloomington	
Paul Rhymer		1905	Oct 26, 1964	Scriptwriter and humorist, creator of Vic and Sade	Grew up in Bloomington	
Claire Schade		1893	1991	Actor, dancer, and singer; mother of George Lincoln Rockwell	Born and grew up in Bloomington	
Sidney Smith		Feb 13, 1877	Oct 20, 1935	Million-dollar Chicago Tribune cartoonist of The Gumps	Worked for The Sunday Eye newspaper in Bloomington	
McLean Stevenson		Nov 14, 1927	Feb 15, 1996	Actor (Henry Blake on M*A*S*H)	Born in Normal, grew up in Bloomington	
Dawn Upshaw		Jul 17, 1960		Singer		

=== Fictional ===
Name	Image	Birth	Death	Known for	Association	Reference
Henry Blake				Character on the TV show M*A*S*H		

== Military ==
Name	Image	Birth	Death	Known for	Association	Reference
Sharon K.G. Dunbar		Jul 12, 1960		US Air Force major general; graduated from the U.S. Air Force Academy in the 3rd class to accept females; commanded Air Force Basic Military Training; first woman to command the Air Force District of Washington; highest ranking Korean-American general in the Air Force	Raised in Bloomington	
Ralph Eaton		Aug 5, 1898	May 1, 1986	US Army brigadier general; graduated from the United States Military Academy at West Point; WWII Chief of Staff 82nd Airborne Division, Army Distinguished Service Medal, Legion of Merit	Born in Bloomington	
James Harbord		Mar 21, 1866	Aug 20, 1947	US Army general in World War I	Born in Bloomington	
Marie Meyer		Apr 7, 1897	Dec 1969	US linguist who worked on Venona project	Raised in Bloomington	
William K. Naylor		Nov 24, 1874	Aug 3, 1942	US Army brigadier general	Born in Bloomington	
William Orme		Feb 17, 1832	Sep 13, 1866	Union Army general in the Civil War	Lived in Bloomington later half of life	
James I. Poynter		Dec 1, 1916	Nov 4, 1950	US Marine Corps Medal of Honor recipient for actions at the Battle of Chosin Reservoir in Korean War	Born in Bloomington	
Sidney S. Wade		Sep 30, 1909	Nov 24, 2002	US Marine Corps major general who commanded Marine Forces during 1958 Lebanon crisis	Born in Bloomington	

== Politics ==
Name	Image	Birth	Death	Known for	Association	Reference
David Davis		Mar 9, 1815	Jun 26, 1886	Appointed to US Supreme Court by Abraham Lincoln	Lived and died in Bloomington	
Joseph W. Fifer		Oct 28, 1840	Aug 6, 1938	19th governor of Illinois	Attended Illinois Wesleyan University, served as city attorney of Bloomington	
John Marshall Hamilton		May 28, 1847	Sep 22, 1905	18th governor of Illinois	Lived in Bloomington	
Ward Hill Lamon		Jan 6, 1828	May 7, 1893	Personal friend and bodyguard of Abraham Lincoln		
John Brown Lennon		Oct 12, 1850	Jan 18, 1923	Labor union leader and American Federation of Labor treasurer		
Kelly Loeffler		Nov 27, 1970		United States senator from Georgia	Born in Bloomington	
George Lincoln Rockwell		Mar 9, 1918	Aug 25, 1967	American Nazi leader	Born in Bloomington	
Rick Scott		Dec 1, 1952		45th governor of Florida; United States senator from Florida	Born in Bloomington	
Adlai E. Stevenson I		Oct 23, 1835	Jun 14, 1914	23rd vice president of the United States under Grover Cleveland; his wife Letitia Green was born in Bloomington	Was raised in Bloomington and attended Illinois Wesleyan University	
Adlai E. Stevenson II		Feb 5, 1900	Jul 14, 1965	31st governor of Illinois, US presidential candidate, and US ambassador to the United Nations	Was raised in Bloomington and attended University High School	

== Sports ==
=== Baseball ===
Name	Image	Birth	Death	Known for	Association	Reference
Bill Conroy		Feb 26, 1915	Nov 13, 1997	Catcher for Philadelphia Athletics and Boston Red Sox	Born in Bloomington	
Jim Cox		May 28, 1950		Second baseman for Montreal Expos	Born in Bloomington	
Bill King		Oct 6, 1927	Oct 18, 2005	Radio sports announcer for Oakland Athletics and Oakland/LA Raiders; Baseball Hall of Fame	Born in Bloomington	
Lyle Luttrell		Feb 22, 1930	Jul 11, 1984	Shortstop for Washington Senators	Born in Bloomington	
Bernie Neis		Sep 26, 1895	Nov 29, 1972	Outfielder for Brooklyn Robins, Boston Braves, Cleveland Indians and Chicago White Sox	Born in Bloomington	
Jack Powell		Jul 9, 1874	Oct 17, 1944	Pitcher for Cleveland Spiders, St. Louis Perfectos, St. Louis Browns and New York Highlanders	Born in Bloomington	
Old Hoss Radbourn		Dec 11, 1854	Feb 5, 1897	Pitcher in Baseball Hall of Fame	Lived and died in Bloomington	
Curt Raydon		Nov 18, 1933	Mar 3, 2018	Pitcher for Pittsburgh Pirates	Born in Bloomington	

=== Basketball ===
Name	Image	Birth	Death	Known for	Association	Reference
Jim Crews		Feb 14, 1954		NCAA basketball player and coach	Attended University High School	

=== Football ===
Name	Image	Birth	Death	Known for	Association	Reference
Bump Elliott		Jan 30, 1925	Dec 7, 2019	Player for Michigan and Purdue; head coach at Michigan (1959–1968); athletic director at Iowa (1970–1991); College Football Hall of Fame	Raised in Bloomington	
Pete Elliott		Sep 29, 1926	Jan 4, 2013	Quarterback of undefeated Michigan football teams (1947 and 1948); head coach at Nebraska, Illinois, Cal, and Miami; College Football Hall of Fame	Born in Bloomington	
Michael Hoomanawanui		Jul 4, 1988		Tight end for New Orleans Saints	Born in Bloomington	
Brandon Hughes		May 23, 1986		Former NFL cornerback for the Philadelphia Eagles	Born in Bloomington	

=== Volleyball ===
Name	Image	Birth	Death	Known for	Association	Reference
Ogonna Nnamani		Jul 29, 1983		US volleyball team member in the 2004 Olympics and 2008 Olympics (silver medalist); graduate of University High School	Born in Bloomington	

=== Australian football ===
Name	Image	Birth	Death	Known for	Association	Reference
Don Pyke		Dec 5, 1968		Head coach of Adelaide Football Club in Australian Football League, player for West Coast Eagles, 1990s	Born in Bloomington	
