= Soble =

Soble (/ˈsoʊbəl/) is a surname. Notable people with the surname include:

- Alan Soble (1947–2025), American philosopher
- Jack Soble (1903–1967), Lithuanian-American spy
- Ken Soble (1911–1966), Canadian broadcasting executive
- Myra Soble (1904–1992), American spy, wife of Jack
