= Grabeel =

Grabeel is a surname. Notable people with the surname include:

- Gene Grabeel (1920–2015), American mathematician and cryptanalyst
- Lucas Grabeel (born 1984), American actor

== See also ==
- Grabel (surname)
