= Robert Soblen =

Soviet spy (1900–1962)

- Born: Robert Sobolevicius; November 7, 1900; Vilkaviškis, Russian Empire
- Died: September 11, 1962 (aged 61)
- Cause of death: Suicide by Barbiturate overdose
- Espionage activity
- Allegiance: Soviet Union

Robert Soblen (born Sobolevicius; November 7, 1900 – September 11, 1962) was a prominent member, with his brother, of the OGPU (KGB) which monitored and betrayed Leon Trotsky in Paris especially. He moved to the United States in 1941 with his brother Jack Soble, and was arrested in 1960 as a Soviet spy. Convicted and sentenced to life in prison, he fled the United States while on bail and sought asylum first in Israel, then in Britain. He committed suicide by overdosing on barbiturates when his last appeal for asylum in Britain was denied.

== Pre-trial career in Europe and the United States ==
Born to a Jewish family in Vilkaviskis, Lithuania, both Soblen and his younger brother Jack (born Abromas Sobolevicius, also known as Abraham or Adolph Senin) were important figures in Trotskyist circles in the 1920s and 1930s. They were very active in French and German Trotskyist movements, handling both Trotsky's secret correspondence to the Soviet Union and publication of his Bulletin of the Opposition. Jack Soble later claimed he and Robert began working for the Soviet Secret Police against Trotsky in 1931. In 1932, Trotsky broke with the brothers, and Robert joined Trotsky's enemies in the Communist Party of Germany.

Soblen, Soble, and many members of their family moved to the United States in 1941. According to Jack Soble's testimony during Robert's trial, they were personally granted permission for the move by NKVD director Lavrenty Beria, on condition that they assist in Soviet espionage activities in the United States. After arriving in the United States, Soblen set up a psychiatric practice in New York. According to testimony at his trial, Soblen's activities also included spying on the Trotskyist movement in the United States and transmitting stolen intelligence documents and military information to the Soviet Union.

== Soble and Soblen Trials ==
Soblen's brother Jack was arrested in 1957 and charged with espionage, primarily based on the testimony of Hollywood producer Boris Morros. Morros first worked with Soble's organization providing business cover for Soviet agents, but later agreed to act as a double agent for the FBI. Soble pleaded guilty to the espionage charges, made a detailed statement of his activities, and was sentenced to seven years in prison.

Robert Soblen was not indicted until 1960. He was charged with providing the Soviet Union with secret OSS documents in World War II and photographs of a U.S. nuclear testing site in 1950. Soblen pleaded not guilty. His trial, at which Jack was a primary witness, ended with his conviction. The judge deferred sentencing until August, and stated that the severity of the sentence would depend on whether Soblen was willing to provide a full account of his espionage to the government. Soblen remained defiant and refused to cooperate, and on August 7, 1961, was sentenced to life imprisonment. Soblen, suffering from leukemia, was released on $100,000 bail pending an appeal. His conviction was upheld by the U.S. Court of Appeals in March 1962, and an appeal to the Supreme Court was rejected in June 1962. Soblen was ordered to report to prison to begin his sentence on June 28, 1962.

== Asylum attempts and suicide ==
Following the rejection of his last appeal, Soblen jumped bail and flew to Israel, using a forged Canadian passport. Once there, he immediately hired legal assistance and claimed Israeli citizenship as a Jew under the Law of Return, and claimed immunity from extradition as an Israeli citizen. He was arrested in his hotel room shortly after his arrival, and the Israeli government declared that the Law of Return was not an open invitation for Jewish criminals to immigrate to Israel. Soblen was denied citizenship, and his appeals were rejected. Although Israel and the United States did not have an extradition agreement at the time, Soblen faced expulsion from Israel and deportation to the United States on charges of illegal entry, due to his having used a false passport to enter the country.

Soblen was deported from Israel on a flight to the United States on July 1. During a stopover in London, Soblen slashed his wrist and abdomen with a dinner knife. He was removed from the airplane and hospitalized. He then hired lawyers and filed a claim for political asylum, or the right to go to any country other than the United States. He also admitted that his actions had not been a suicide attempt, but were rather a ruse to gain admittance to Britain. After Soblen underwent a medical examination in a prison hospital, doctors determined that his leukemia was dormant, that he did not face imminent death from the disease, and that he had a life expectancy of several years rather than several months. British courts denied a series of appeals, and in September 1962, ordered him deported back to the United States. On the day of his deportation, Soblen took an overdose of barbiturates. It is unclear whether this was a legitimate suicide attempt or another attempt to delay deportation. He fell unconscious while being escorted to the airport, and was taken to a hospital. He never regained consciousness, and died on September 11, 1962.

== Aftermath ==
The Soble/Soblen trials revealed a great deal about Soviet espionage directed against Trotsky and his followers. They also revealed a number of aspects of Soviet espionage against the United States in the 1940s and 1950s, and were one of the more successful espionage prosecutions in the early Cold War period. The extent to which the Venona decryption project assisted in the case is not clear. The project was never mentioned during either of the brothers' trials, but according to Klehr and Haynes, a number of cables deciphered by the Venona project mention Soblen under the covername ROMAN, the pseudonym he used in Germany. Soblen's expulsion from Israel was controversial enough to provoke a no-confidence vote against David Ben-Gurion's government. The vote failed, but the controversy may have contributed to the passing of Israel's "Offenses Committed Abroad Act" in 1978, which sharply restricted the circumstances under which Israeli citizens could be extradited. Soblen's asylum request in England also generated controversy and calls for reform.

== Sources ==
- Abramovsky, Abraham and Jonathan I. Edelstein. "The Sheinbein Case and the Israeli-American Extradition Experience: A Need for Compromise," Vanderbilt Journal of Transnational Law 32 (1999): 305
- Anderson, David. "Soblen Branded Spy by Brother" New York Times, June 22, 1961, p. 11.
- Deutscher, Isaac. The Prophet Outcast: Trotsky, 1929-1940, Oxford University Press (1963)
- Haynes, John Earl, and Harvey Klehr. Venona: Decoding Soviet Espionage in America, Yale University Press (1999)
- Haynes, John Earl, and Harvey Klehr. Early Cold War Spies: The Espionage Trials that Shaped American Politics, Cambridge University Press (2006)
- Schafranek, Hans. "Kurt Landau," Cahiers Leon Trotsky, Paris #5, First Trimester 1980, 74.
- Thornberry, Cedric H. R. "The Soblen Case," Political Quarterly 34, no. 2 (April 1963): 162–173.
