= Lamphere =

Lamphere is a surname. Notable people with the surname include:

- Louise Lamphere (born 1940), American anthropologist
- Robert J. Lamphere (1918–2002), American intelligence agent

== See also ==
- Lamphere Public Schools
