= Jane Foster Zlatovski =

Alleged American spy for the Soviet Union

Jane Foster Zlatovski (1912–1979) allegedly engaged, with her husband, George Zlatovski, in covert activities on behalf of the Soviet Union while employed in sensitive U.S. Government wartime agencies during World War II. They were indicted in 1957. Their case was never tried and both Zlatovskis denied the accusations.

== Early life ==
Jane Foster grew up in San Francisco, California. Her father, Harry Emerson Foster, was the medical director of the Cutter Laboratories. Her mother was Eve Cody Foster. Foster attended Mills College in Oakland, California, graduating in 1935.

Foster married Dutch diplomat Alleendert Kamper in October 1936. She and Kamper separated after 18 months. Foster, required to spend five months on Dutch soil in order to finalize the divorce, travelled to Bali. She remained there until September 1939, returning to the United States due to the British declaration of war on Germany. She briefly joined the Communist Party USA in 1938.

Foster met and married Zlatovski in Washington, D.C. in 1943, then remarried him three years later. She was employed by the Board of Economic Warfare and the Office of Strategic Services from late 1943 until early 1946 in the Indonesian section. Foster was one of the first OSS agents to reach Indonesia after the Japanese surrender in 1945, where she interviewed Sukarno to discover whether he planned to align himself with Allied interests. Foster wrote in her autobiography that Soviet agent Charles Flato was one of her closest friends at the Board.

== Allegations of espionage ==
Foster was allegedly recruited into espionage in 1938 by NKVD operative Martha Dodd. In 1942, Foster rented a room from Henry Collins in Washington, D.C., who likewise was active in the secret apparatus. After World War II, Foster and her husband allegedly became members of a Soviet espionage ring run by Jack Soble. She is believed to be identified in Soviet intelligence and in the Venona project files with the code name SLANG, where she is mentioned as engaged in transmitting information and in other espionage tasks. According to Gregg Herken, SLANG is named in two cables decrypted in the Venona project, one dated 21 June 1943, the other dated 30 May 1944.

The Zlatovskis were indicted by a Federal grand jury on July 8, 1957, on charges of espionage. The couple were living in Paris at the time, and denied the charges in a brief interview with the New York Times.

Time Magazine sensationally alleged in 1957 the Zlatovskis became part of the Soble network in January 1940. At times they dealt directly with Soble, while on other occasions they are thought to have worked with Boris Morros. According to Morros, Jane and George Zlatovski were useful espionage agents and served a crucial role in the Soble spy network. As reported in Time, "[I]n covert meetings in the U.S. and a dozen European cities (including Moscow) the Zlatovskis turned over to Morros a file-load of valuable information that was passed to Soviet intelligence." George Zlatovski (alleged code name RECTOR) was not as active as his wife, gathering mostly information on refugees for Soviet intelligence. As a team, the two allegedly collected information on the "sexual and drinking habits" of U.S. personnel stationed in Austria, apparently for blackmail recruitment of new agents for espionage activity.

After revelations of the Soble network appeared in the press in 1957, both Jane and George Zlatovski denied Morros' allegations. They remained in exile in Paris, where Foster reconnected with Julia Child and her husband, Paul, both of whom had worked with Foster in the OSS. Although the U.S. government tried to extradite the Zlatovskis, it was unable to do so. Although she continued to publicly deny her involvement in espionage, it has been reported Foster confessed to both French intelligence agents and to the Paris office of the FBI.

Her autobiography, An Un-American Lady, is a colorful account of an upper-class expatriate socialite in the pre- and post-World War II era, and also recounts her involuntary detention in the U.S., surveillance by FBI and CIA agents, and description of McCarthy-era America.
