= Grabel (surname) =

Grabel is a surname. Notable people with the surname include:

- Ross Grabel (born 1950), American bridge player
- Susan Grabel, American feminist artist
