= Jones Orin York =

American spy for the Soviet Union

Jones Orin York (August 5, 1893 – July 1970) was recruited in California by Soviet spy Stanislav Shumovskij approximately in 1935. In 1950 York told the FBI that he had passed secrets to the KGB since the mid-1930s, including plans for a new airplane engine of his own design and documents on the newest fighter developed by Northrop Corporation. York told the FBI that his KGB handler during 1941-42 had been Bill Weisband, who had helped him buy a camera for photographing documents. York admitted he was in it for the money, although he received very little.

York's allegation was disturbing news, implying that the KGB had a mole in the sensitive Armed Forces Security Agency (AFSA). York's code name in Soviet intelligence and in the Venona project is "NEEDLE".
