= Bill Weisband =

Soviet spy

William Weisband, Sr.
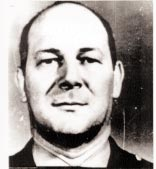
- Born: August 28, 1908; Odessa, Russian Empire (now Ukraine)
- Died: May 14, 1967 (aged 58); Virginia
- Children: 5; 4 daughters and 1 son

William Weisband, Sr. (August 28, 1908 – May 14, 1967) was a Ukrainian-American cryptanalyst and NKVD agent (code name 'LINK'), best known for his role in revealing U.S. decryptions of Soviet diplomatic and intelligence codes to Soviet intelligence.

== Background ==
Weisband was born in Odessa, Russian Empire (now Ukraine), in 1908. He emigrated to the United States in the 1920s and became a naturalized United States citizen in 1938. He was drafted into the United States Army in 1942, and was assigned to signals intelligence duties.

== Espionage career ==
From 1941 to 1942, Weisband was the NKVD agent handler for Jones Orin York, who worked at the Northrop Corporation. After joining the U.S. Army's Signals Intelligence Service (SIS) in 1942, he performed signals intelligence and communications security duties in North Africa and Italy, where he made some important friends before returning to the "Russian Section" at Arlington Hall, where SIS had established its headquarters in June 1942. Although not a cryptanalyst himself, as a "linguist adviser" who spoke fluent Russian, Weisband worked closely with cryptanalysts. The gregarious and popular Weisband had access to all areas of Arlington Hall's Soviet work. The codebreaker Meredith Gardner recalled that Weisband had watched him extract a list of Western atomic scientists from a December 1944 NKVD message.

The Soviets apparently had monitored Arlington Hall's "Russian Section" since at least 1945, when Weisband joined the unit. Weisband notified the Soviets that the Venona Project was on the verge of success. To make sure that the FBI was unaware that they knew that the code was about to be broken, they continued to use it. The "operatives" were instructed "every week to compose summary reports or information on the basis of press and personal connections to be transferred to the Center by telegraph." As Allen Weinstein pointed out, "Soviet intelligence's once-flourishing American networks, in short, had been transformed almost overnight into a virtual clipping service."

In February 1948 a Soviet official wrote an internal memorandum about the work of Weisband:

For one year, a large amount of very valuable documentary material concerning the work of Americans on deciphering Soviet ciphers, intercepting and analyzing open radio-correspondence of Soviet institutions (the Venona project), was received from (Weisband). From these materials, we came to know that, as a result of this work, American intelligence managed to acquire important data concerning the stationing of the USSR's armed forces, the productive capacity of various branches of industry, and work in the field of atomic energy in the USSR... On the basis of Weisband's materials, our state security organs carried out a number of defensive measures, resulting in the reduced efficiency of the American deciphering service. This has led to the considerable current reduction in the amount of deciphering and analysis by the Americans.

His role as a Soviet agent was not discovered by counterintelligence officers until 1950, by which time the damage had been done. Where Weisband had sketched the outlines of U.S. cryptanalytic success, British liaison officer Kim Philby received actual translations and analyses on a regular basis after he arrived for duty in Washington, D.C., in autumn 1949. Until a thorough review of Soviet KGB archives is made, the full scope of Weisband's role as a Soviet spy will probably not be known.

In 1950 Jones Orin York told the FBI that he had passed secrets to the Soviets and that his handler was Bill Weisband. The Venona messages do not hold a definite reference to Weisband. Nevertheless, three messages mention a "ZVENO" (the Russian word for "link") and one of them suggests procedures for the London residency to use in contacting ZVENO, who was awaiting a transfer to England. ZVENO, according to one message, had spent the last four weeks in an Italian-language course in Virginia and would leave for Britain by mid-July. In fact, Weisband spent that June honing his skills in a language (probably Italian) at Arlington Hall, shipped out on 17 July, and arrived in London by 29 July.

While suspended from SIS on suspicion of disloyalty, Weisband failed to appear for a federal grand jury hearing on the Communist Party USA, for which he had received a summons. As a result, in November 1950, Weisband was convicted of contempt and sentenced to a year in prison. Weisband escaped prosecution for espionage, as authorities feared that a trial would divulge yet more information to Soviet intelligence on U.S. intelligence "sources and methods". Weisband never revealed his status as an NKVD agent to anyone, and he remained in the United States, living quietly, and working as an insurance salesman until his death.

== Death ==
He died suddenly of a heart attack in 1967.
