= Robert J. Lamphere =

FBI agent

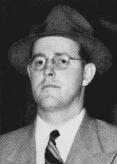
- Robert J. Lamphere of the FBI
- Born: February 14, 1918; Wardner, Idaho, US
- Died: January 7, 2002 (aged 83); Tucson, Arizona, US
- Education: University of Idaho
- Alma mater: National University School of Law
- Occupation: FBI agent
- Years active: 1940s–1970s
- Employer: Federal Bureau of Investigation
- Known for: Arrests of Klaus Fuchs, Harry Gold, Julius Rosenberg, Ethel Rosenberg
- Notable work: Venona Project
- Spouse: Martha

Robert J. Lamphere (February 14, 1918 - January 7, 2002) was a former agent of the Federal Bureau of Investigation (FBI) involved in the cases of atomic spies Klaus Fuchs, Harry Gold, Julius Rosenberg, and Ethel Rosenberg, as well as British spy Kim Philby. "He had a hand in every major Soviet spy case from the end of World War II through the mid-1950s."

== Background ==
Robert Joseph Lamphere was born on February 14, 1918, in Wardner, Idaho and grew up in Mullan, Idaho, where his father had mining rights. He graduated from the University of Idaho and attended its law school before finishing his degree at the National University School of Law (now George Washington University Law School) in Washington, DC.

== Career ==
=== FBI ===
In September 1941, Lamphere joined the FBI and worked for half a year in Birmingham, Alabama. Transferred in 1942 to New York City, he arrested more than 400 people over the next three and a half years. Transferred in 1945 to Washington, DC, to work on the Soviet espionage squad, he helped investigate Soviet atomic espionage into the top-secret Manhattan Project. In 1947, he became a supervisory special agent and worked with other FBI agents in analyzing Soviet code and other intelligence involving the USSR and its satellites in the Soviet Bloc. By October 1948, he was working with Meredith Knox Gardner on what became known as the VENONA project full-time. At that point, Gardner began decoding specific messages for Lamphere to investigate. In 1949, Lamphere briefed Kim Philby about VENONA. In 1950, deciphered code led Lamphere to interview German-born physicist Klaus Fuchs, attached to research at Los Alamos and later the British atomic energy research center. Fuchs confessed, which led to Harry Gold in the US, which led to more spies including David Greenglass, his wife Ruth Greenglass, and the Rosenbergs.

(FBI historian John F. Fox Jr. provides a detailed account of Lamphere's FBI career, available online.)

=== Later life ===
In 1955, Lamphere left the FBI to work in the Veterans Administration, where he became a deputy administrator. In 1961, he became an executive at the John Hancock Mutual Insurance Company and retired in 1981.

== Personal life and death ==
Lamphere married Martha.

In 1996, Lamphere stated that both he and J. Edgar Hoover opposed the death penalty for Ethel Rosenberg because (1) she had acted under her husband's direction and (2) her death would draw sympathy.

Lamphere criticized US Senator Joseph R. McCarthy: "McCarthy's star chamber proceedings, his lies, and overstatements hurt our counterintelligence efforts."

Lamphere died age 83 in Tucson, Arizona, from a combination of Parkinson's disease and prostate cancer.

== Works ==
Georgetown University archives Lamphere's papers.

The FBI-KGB War, Lamphere's book (written with Tom Shachtman) on his involvement in the Cold War, is an oft-cited source, deemed "very readable." Historian Harvey Klehr, reviewing the book, noted Lamphere's criticism of J. Edgar Hoover: "Although Lamphere clearly admires Hoover, and praises his political acumen, it is evident that Hoover’s fondness for draconian punishments of underlings, his encouragement of excessive flattery, and his often petty demands sometimes prevented the FBI from making full use of its resources."

- The FBI-KGB War: A Special Agent's Story (1986) with Tom Shachtman

== See also ==
- J. Edgar Hoover
- William C. Sullivan
- James J. Angleton
- Manhattan Project
- Venona Project
- Meredith Knox Gardner
- Kim Philby
- Klaus Fuchs
- Harry Gold
- Julius Rosenberg
- Ethel Rosenberg
