= Marie Meyer (linguist) =

American linguist and spy

Marie Anne Meyer
- Born: April 7, 1897
- Died: 1969 (aged 71–72)
- Occupation: Linguist

Marie Anne Meyer (April 7, 1897 – 1969) was an American linguist and spy who worked for the National Security Agency from 1943 to 1960. She was assigned to the Venona project and is credited with making some of the first recoveries of the Venona codebook. She studied eight foreign languages and was the first person to receive the NSA's Meritorious Civilian Service Award.

== Biography ==
=== Early life and education ===
Meyer was born on April 7, 1897, and raised in Bloomington, Illinois. She attended Illinois Normal State University in Normal, Illinois, and graduated with a bachelor's degree in education in 1919. She began teaching at schools after graduation and continued her education through summer sessions at the University of Chicago, studying French and Latin. In August 1930, she received a master's degree in Latin. In the 1930s and 1940s, she pursued further language studies, taking summer classes in Sanskrit, Greek, and German.

=== Career ===
In 1943, Meyer was hired by the Signal Security Agency, most likely as a German linguist. In the summer of 1946, she took a University of Chicago course in Russian and was assigned to the Venona project by the National Security Agency. She is credited with making some of the first recoveries of the Venona codebook. For the rest of her career, Meyer worked on other facets of the Russian problem and taught Russian classes at the NSA training school. A 1950 NSA memorandum described Meyer as a "highly professional Russian linguist holding the highest level of competency."

=== Later life ===
Meyer retired in 1960 and was the first person to receive the Meritorious Civilian Service Award. She spent her retirement years engaging in research at Catholic University in Celtic languages. She died in Illinois in December 1969.
