= Lura Eyestone =

American educator

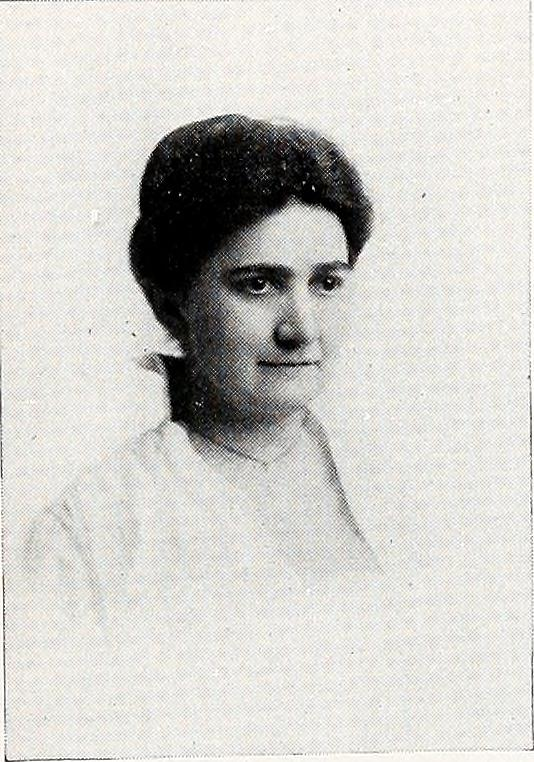
- Born: October 14, 1872; Bloomington, Illinois, US
- Died: March 9, 1965 (aged 92); Normal, Illinois, US
- Education: Columbia University (Bachelor's, teaching)
- Occupation: Critic teacher

Lura Eyestone (1872-1965) was an educator and author. She both attended and worked at Illinois State Normal University (ISNU). The Eyestone School in Normal, Illinois, honors her contributions to education.

== Early life ==
Lura was born on October 14, 1872, in Bloomington, Illinois. Her parents were Theodore Riley and Martha (Liston) Congleton. She had three sisters named Letha, Cora, and Dora. Letha, however, was born to Elizabeth Liston, Martha's older sister, given that Theodore was married to her at one point as well. Theodore worked as a police officer in the community, but eventually resigned and moved to Indiana in 1874. Lura's mother, Martha, died the same year, just two years after Lura was born. Lura was thus adopted by Charles and Martha (Johnson) Eyestone.

Lura then relocated nearby in Normal, Illinois, with her adoptive parents. Charles was a farmer and a veteran of the American Civil War. The family had an abundant fruit farm. Though unemployed, Martha was a member of the Women's Home Missionary Society, which was organized through the family's church, Grace Methodist Episcopal Church.

Charles and Martha wanted Lura to receive a quality education. Thus, they sent her to the Normal Public Schools. This decision was made due to their skepticism of practicing teachers, who were often educating children in the community through the teacher education program at Illinois State Normal University. However, Lura would walk among ISNU's campus and fantasize about attending school there. This eventually inspired her to advocate for herself and her attendance at one of the laboratory schools, University High School, to which her parents finally obliged. Lura graduated from this school in 1892.

She then went to ISNU from 1892 to 1893 to receive her teacher education. During her first year, she joined the Sapphonian Society, which was an all-female literary society, mentored by June Rose Colby. She became the society's president.

== Career ==
Lura's first teaching occupation was at Rose Hill School in Normal (now known as the Eyestone School). This was a one-room schoolhouse. Although she was supposed to remain there for three months, she was only there for two weeks. This was due to the school's roof getting destroyed after a storm. Once this was repaired, Rose Hill reopened in the fall term and Lura stayed there for the academic year.

In 1894, Lura moved to higher grades and taught through the Normal school district at "Old Ark," which was the name of the school building. Once this school expanded to hold high school-level courses, it adopted a three-year program in 1895, then upgraded even further to a four-year program in 1897.

Then, in 1901, Lura began her time as faculty at Illinois State Normal University as a "critic teacher," or a teacher who trained future educators. This was practiced at the university's Training School, which would come to be known as Thomas Metcalf School in 1914. She, among other critic teachers, instructed future educators on not only content knowledge, but also how to effectively incorporate teaching practices and impact student lives. Once these training teachers would enter the classroom, at one of the two lab schools in town (the other being University High), critic teachers would observe them and offer feedback.

Training teachers would also observe Lura teach to garner inspiration. Lura explained that she "had only 30 to 60 observers in a three-hour morning," noting that at one point, she "had to train 14 student teachers with only one class of third graders."

During her time with Illinois State Normal University, she was also pursuing her own higher education. She attended several institutions. In 1896, she attended Chicago Normal School, then Columbia University in 1905, ultimately earning a two-year degree the following year from ISNU. At Columbia, she also received a Bachelor's degree in 1911, as she spent her time at the Teacher's College from 1906 to 1907. Lura was one of only 8,934 women to receive a bachelor's degree that year, from a total of 37,481 Bachelor's degrees in the country. Lura also briefly taught at Greenway School in Bisbee, Arizona, from 1921 to 1922, during her 38-years’ time at ISNU.

In 1908, Lura helped found the Parent Teacher Association at Metcalf, where she remained very active and contributed much to its development throughout her career. She was also heavily involved in the lives of her students, wanting to provide more for them than strictly academics. For instance, she coordinated a musical performance alongside one of her training teachers in 1938, her last year of teaching. Lura also embarked on a field trip to Guatemala and around the Caribbean in 1937 under guidance of Dr. Clarence F Jones of Clark University, which enhanced her cultural knowledge to offer more to her students. This was reported in the local newspaper, The Vidette, at the time, due to the rarity and excitement of the situation, especially given her position as an educator. She later shared her observations and experience from this trip and her time in Yucatan to educate members of the Social Science club in 1945, after she had retired from teaching.

Lura was also very student-centered in her teaching style. For example, she used students' stories to craft her teaching material. These materials ranged from a variety of subjects, such as health, nature, music, geography, and art.

Lura was well known throughout Central Illinois due to her involvement in events throughout McLean County. She was the guest of honor at a faculty dinner for ISNU in 1938, where she was awarded a gift.

In addition to her educational feats, Lura published several works. She firstly began submitting work to the Practical School Journal in 1907. Three years later, as she continued her journal submissions, she published Rimes and Stories, which was intended to teach children how to read through nursery rhymes and short stories. She also co-authored a textbook with Douglas C. Ridgley entitled Home Geography in 1915. Her 10 articles within the text focused on different groups throughout the world that its readers might not have encountered before, like "North American native groups, Eskimos, the Swiss, and the Dutch." The goal of this text was to garner a love of research in pupils and encourage them to investigate their surroundings in regard to geography.

Additionally, Lura had her students contribute to the local community through different acts of charity work. One instance occurred in 1931, where her students donated food to a local charity.

== Retirement and community engagement ==
Lura was an active member of multiple organizations in the Bloomington-Normal community both before and after she retired in 1938. One of which was the Normal Women's Improvement League, established in 1907, which promoted women's involvement in charity work, educating children, and other types of civic engagement. There were several notable achievements of this group, in which Lura would have contributed. One notable success was the establishment of the Normal train station in 1923. A particular interest of Lura's, though, pertained to gardening and cultivating nature in the community, hence her position as chairwoman for "30th annual fall exhibit of fruits, vegetables, and flowers, grown by the members of the Alice Jean Patterson Children's Garden club, which the Normal Improvement League sponsored." Her interest in gardening also led to her membership in the Bloomington-Normal Garden Club.

Given Lura's active membership in her church, she also joined the Women's Foreign Ministry Society with her adoptive mother. There was eventually a merger, however, between Grace Methodist Episcopal Church (renamed Grace Methodist Church) and Wesley United Methodist Church in 1952, causing her to join the latter's Women's Society of Christian Service instead. She was greatly dedicated to this group as well.

Combining her religion with her interest in women's rights, Lura was concerned with the Women's Christian Temperance Union (WCTU), a popular issue among women in the late 19th to early 20th century. This group was founded in 1874 and played a role in the passing of the 18th Amendment in the Constitution (though eventually repealed) that prohibited alcohol use. The WCTU's advocacy extended beyond prohibition, though, to issues such as women's suffrage and labor reform.

Per her contributions to the Metcalf PTA, in 1948, she was elected the organization's historian and granted lifetime membership with the Illinois Congress of Parents and Teachers.

The Idlers Club, established in 1896, was yet another organization in which Lura was a member. This club was dedicated to history and literature, coordinated by women at ISNU. She was voted the second member out of 9 charter members and appointed president in 1899, 1925, and 1948. She was heavily involved with this group and hosted them at her home on one occasion in 1946.

Lura was also a public speaker who shared her ideas about education as well as personal interests, sparking inspiration in her listeners. Her audiences would range from those in the field of education, women's clubs, church goers, and more. For instance, after her travels to Guatemala that closed her teaching career, she ventured to New Zealand in 1948, eventually speaking about this experience to the Women's Society of Christian Service. This speech was called "A Methodist Woman Looks at Methodism in New Zealand." She frequented several destinations in the United States as well, contributing to her overall worldliness.

Other memberships of note included "the ISNU Alumni Association, the Friday Evening History Club, the Normal Unit of the Home Bureau, the YWCA, and the Koda-Roamers (a photography club)."

== Legacy and death ==
The Eyestone School was created to honor Lura's excellence in teaching and educate museum goers on the development of teaching practices in the state of Illinois, particularly through the use of one-room schoolhouses. This was officially dedicated in her name in 1965 as a part of the Normal Centennial Celebration.

Lura died on March 9, 1965, at 92 years old in Brokaw Hospital. She requested any condolences be shared in the form of donations to either the Baby Fold or the construction of Wesley Church.

She is buried at Evergreen Memorial Cemetery in Bloomington, Illinois, along with her adoptive parents.

== Bibliography ==
- Eyestone, L. M. (1910). Rimes and Stories. Bloomington, Illinois: Public School Publishing Company.
- Ridgley, D. Clay., Eyestone, L. Mary. (1915). Home geography: a textbook for pupils, based on the Illinois state course of study. Normal, Illinois: McKnight & McKnight.
