= Jack Soble =

Lithuanian-born Soviet spy (1903–1967)

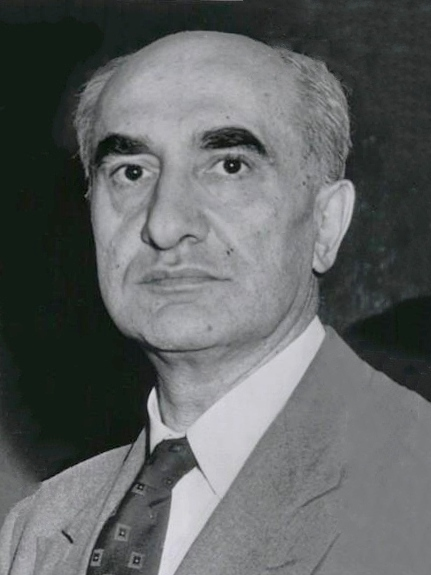
- Soble in 1957
- Born: Abromas Sobolevicius; May 15, 1903; Vilkaviskis, Lithuania
- Died: 1967 (aged 63–64)
- Spouse: Myra Soble
- Espionage activity
- Allegiance: Soviet Union
- Codename: ABRAM

Jack Soble (May 15, 1903 – 1967) was a Lithuanian who, together with his brother Robert Soblen, penetrated Leon Trotsky's entourage for Soviet intelligence in the 1920s. Later, in the United States, he was jailed, with his wife Myra, on espionage charges. He was born in Vilkaviskis, Lithuania as Abromas Sobolevicius and sometimes used the name Abraham Sobolevicius or Adolph Senin.

== Biography ==
=== Early life ===
Soble was born in 1903 as Abromas Sobolevicius in, then-Russian controlled, Lithuania to a wealthy Jewish family. Soble travelled to Leipzig in 1921, to attend college, while there he joined the German Communist Party. In 1927 he travelled to the Soviet Union marrying before returning to Germany. Soble studied briefly at the University of Berlin where he became a Trotskyist which led to his expulsion from the Communist Party and the university.

=== Spying career ===
Soble would claim decades later that he was coerced by Soviet agents to become a spy in 1931 after his wife returned to the USSR to visit her sick mother and threats to her safety were made if he did not cooperate. These claims are considered suspect as there is evidence that Soble had earlier contact with Stalin's agents.

Soble, who now adopted the name Abraham Senin, became publicly known as a prominent member of the German Trotskyist circle, visiting Leon Trotsky himself on at least two occasions. On a mission to gather intelligence on Stalin's opponent Leon Trotsky, Soble visited Trotsky in Prinkipo, Turkey in 1931 and in Copenhagen, Denmark a year later. However, suspicions were aroused about his activities and Trotsky booted Senin and his brother Robert from the party. Soble returned to the USSR and began working for Profintern.

In 1940, Soviet spymaster Lavrenty Beria dispatched the entire Soble family to the United States, by way of Japan and Canada. Soble later testified that Beria had told him that if he undertook the mission to spy on the United States, Beria would allow Soble's entire family to leave the Soviet Union.

Soble arrived in 1941, and took over supervision of an NKVD spy ring known as the "Mocase", replacing Vasily Zarubin who under the pseudonym "Vasili Zubilin" became the head of the NKVD in the United States.

=== Arrest ===
The seeds of Soble's downfall came in 1947, when founding member of the ring, Boris Morros confessed to FBI agents that he had been working as a Soviet spy. Morros agreed to operate as a double agent, betraying Soble and the other members of the ring. Both Soble and his wife, Myra, were arrested in 1957. Morros also named Jane Foster Zlatovski, her husband George Zlatovski, Alfred Stern, Robert Soblen, and Jacob Albam as members of the espionage ring that Soble participated in.

After their arrest, the Sobles were interviewed numerous times, Jack at the Federal Correction Facility in Danbury, Connecticut and Myra at the Women's House of Detention, in New York City, where they provided some information. They were questioned about members of the Rosenberg spy ring, but they both denied knowing many of the members. The Sobles revealed that they had traveled to Russia, Lithuania, Germany, France, Switzerland, Austria, Japan, Canada, and the United States on behalf of Soviet intelligence.

While awaiting trial, Soble attempted to commit suicide and government attorneys described him as a "psychopathic personality." After a trial, both Soble and Myra Soble, along with their associate Jacob Albam, were convicted on espionage charges and sentenced to prison. Myra Soble received a five-and-a-half year prison sentence for her role in the espionage ring. On October 8, 1957, Federal Judge Richard H. Levet, United States District Court, Southern District of New York, reduced her sentence to four years. Soble was found to have been informing the Soviet Union about aspects of the United States' national defense.

Soble himself was sentenced to a seven-year sentence, which he began serving at Lewisburg Prison. In 1958, Soble intentionally swallowed more than a pound of nuts and bolts, in what was characterized as a suicide attempt but which Soble later claimed was a protest against prison conditions. In 1961, Soble testified against his brother, despite attempts by Robert's attorney to have Soble declared mentally incompetent. His brother committed suicide in 1962, and shortly thereafter, Soble was released early for good behavior.

Following his release, Soble continued to testify for the government in other espionage trials.

== See also ==
- Soviet espionage in the United States
