= Gene Grabeel =

American mathematician

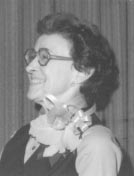
- Born: June 5, 1920; Rose Hill, Virginia, US
- Died: January 30, 2015 (aged 94); Blackstone, Virginia, US
- Education: Mars Hill College; Farmville State Teachers College
- Known for: The Venona project
- Scientific career
- Fields: Mathematics; Cryptanalysis
- Workplaces: Signal Intelligence Service

Gene Grabeel (June 5, 1920 – January 30, 2015) was an American mathematician and cryptanalyst who founded the Venona project.

== Early life ==
Grabeel was born on June 5, 1920, in Rose Hill, Lee County, Virginia, where she grew up; her mother raised chickens and her father farmed tobacco. She graduated from Mars Hill College and Farmville State Teachers College and initially worked as a high school home economics teacher in Madison Heights to teenage girls.

== Career ==
On the recommendation of a friend of hers, Frank Rowlett, Grabeel joined the Signal Intelligence Service on December 28, 1942, where she was assigned to attack intercepted Soviet ciphertext. Her father gave her his permission to do so and "push some papers around" during the next few months. Thus Grabeel began her 36-year career with the Signal Intelligence Service.

On February 1, 1943, she founded the Venona project, a counterintelligence program aimed at decrypting Soviet communications. She and others spent months sifting through stored and incoming Soviet telegrams. Grabeel initially worked with Leonard Zubko, a Russian speaker, but he was soon replaced.

In his book Code Warriors: NSA's Codebreakers and the Secret Intelligence War Against the Soviet Union, Stephen Budiansky describes how she came into the opportunity to work as a U.S. government cryptanalyst:

Gene Grabeel ... was teaching high school near Lynchburg in central Virginia and dissatisfied with her job when she met a young Army officer in the post office who was looking for college graduates to go work at an undisclosed location near Washington, to do a job he could not offer any details about. ... Grabeel had been thinking about trying to get a job with the federal government and asked her father what he thought of the idea. He told her she might as well "go to Washington for six months and shuffle papers." She was off to the capital as soon as she found a replacement teacher to take over for her.

— Stephen Budiansky (2016)

Grabeel retired from service in 1978, as the Venona project came to a close.

== Personal life ==
Grabeel attended Blackstone Baptist Church. She was a member of the Daughters of the American Revolution and of the 17th Century Colonial Dames. Later in life, she was a fan of University of Virginia basketball. She dated men, but was not interested in marriage, similarly to her colleagues.

== Death and legacy ==
Grabeel died at age 94 on January 30, 2015, in Blackstone, Virginia. After the 1995 declassification of the Venona project, Grabeel was recognized by the Central Intelligence Agency as an "American Hero". She was memorialized with a historical highway marker along with Frank Rowlett in Virginia.
