= Susan Grabel =

American artist (born 1942)

Susan Grabel (born 1942, Brooklyn, NY) is an American feminist artist and sculptor. Recognized for her humanistic artworks addressing social and women's issues, she was featured as the contemporary artist alongside historical and modern pioneering artists such as Françoise Gilot, Käthe Kollwitz, Lee Krasner, and Elizabeth Catlett in the Hofstra University Museum of Art exhibition Deconstructing Venus .

She was married to American history professor George Rappaport and has two children.

== Education and Artistic Training ==
In 1961 Grabel attended a summer session at the University of Wisconsin in Madison and unexpectedly decided to take a sculpture couse: "I spent day and night in the studio, and that was it!" Upon returning to New York, she completed undergraduate studies at Brooklyn College in 1963. In 1964, she finished studying sculpture at the Brooklyn Museum Art School where she studied with Joe Konzal, Tom Doyle and Jolyon Hofsted.

From 1965 to 1968, Grabel lived in the San Francisco Bay Area and briefly studied ceramic sculpture at California College of the Arts in Oakland, with Viola Frey and Vernon Coykendall . In 1969, Grabel debuted ceramic sculpture at Pace College Art Gallery in New York City that was later acquired by the American Museum of Ceramic Art (AMOCA) in Pomona California in 2023.

== Early Career ==
In 1970 Grabel moved to Staten Island, New York when her husband George Rappaport, received a teaching position at Wagner College. Throughout the 1970s and 1980s, she was active in the figurative co-op gallery movement in SoHo. Her work first appeared at Women in the Arts Gallery located on Broome Street and then primarily at Prince Street Gallery until the mid-1980s. She is currently showing with Ceres Gallery in Manhattan.

== Feminist Activism & Leadership ==
Grabel was the President of the New York City chapter of the Women’s Caucus for Art (WCA) from 1992 to 1994, and later served as a National Board Member, and National Treasurer.

In 2011 she joined Ceres Gallery in Manhattan where she served as Vice President from 2014 to 2017, followed by President starting in 2017.

== Artwork ==
Since the 1960s, Grabel has produced art in thematic series rather than singular pieces, exploring ideas across various mediums including clay, paper, printmaking, collagraph, and wood. Her early abstract clay sculptures debuted at the Pace College Gallery in 1969.

Since the 1970s, Grabel has incorporated both feminist and social issues into her sculpted forms. Paul Master-Karnik responded to “City Environment #1” (1976) and “Face of the Enemy #2" (1980) as artworks that focused on figures who struggled through their daily life.

Throughout the 1970s and 1980s, her work fused feminist and social commentary, with early stoneware such as Still Life with Hat and Bag (1975) and Still Life with Extension Cord (1977) reflecting the pressures of daily life.

Grabel's tactile approach to social issues evolved into the artist's series addressing the themes of urban poverty and alienation, including Homeless in the Land of Plenty (1983–1990) and Faces of Alienation (1990–1999).

In later decades, Grabel’s focus shifted toward broader sociopolitical and existential themes. The Venus Cycle (1998–2013) utilized cast paper, collagraphs, and mixed media to challenge youth-centric beauty standards by portraying the un-idealized, aging female body. Her subsequent Confluence series (2006–2021) addressed political polarization and ecological survival, incorporating larger-scale laser-cut wood sculptures. More recently, her work has turned toward inward reflection, producing cardboard and cast-paper sculptures responding to the COVID-19 pandemic and processing personal loss following the death of her husband in 2024.

Grabel's sustained exploration of these themes led to her selection as the featured contemporary artist in the 2026 Hofstra University Museum of Art exhibition Deconstructing Venus, where her artwork and sculptures were highlighted for exploring the female form alongside historical pioneers Françoise Gilot, Käthe Kollwitz, Lee Krasner, and Elizabeth Catlett.

== Museum Collections ==
Susan Grabel’s art is featured in the permanent collections of the following museums:

- American Museum of Ceramic Art (Pomona, CA)
- Bates College Museum of Art (Lewiston, ME)
- Canton Museum of Art (Canton, OH)
- Crocker Art Museum (Sacramento, CA)
- Figge Art Museum (Davenport, IA)
- Fleming Museum of Art at University of Vermont (Burlington, VT)
- Judson Memorial Church (New York, NY)
- Kruizenga Art Museum at Hope College (Holland MI)
- Lawrence Community Works (Lawrence, MA)
- Mattatuck Museum (Waterbury, CT)
- RISD Museum of Art (Providence, RI)
- Ross Art Museum at Ohio Wesleyan University (Delaware, OH),
- Rowan University Art Gallery (Rowan, NJ)
- Samuel Dorsky Museum of Art at SUNY (New Paltz, NY)
- San Angelo Museum of Fine Art (San Angelo, TX)
- Staten Island Museum (Staten Island, NY)
- New Mexico State University Art Museum (Las Cruces, NM)
- David Owsley Museum of Art (Ball State University, IN)
- Holy Cross Medical Center (Taos, NM)
