= Myra Soble =

American spy for the Soviet Union (1904–1992)

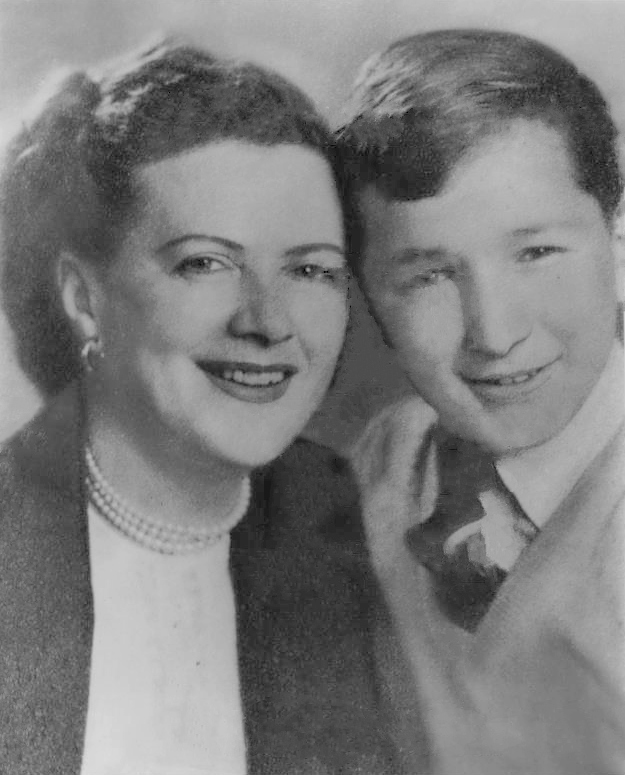
- Soble with son in 1950
- Born: Myra Perske; March 18, 1904; Nikolaev, Russian Empire
- Died: 1992 (aged 87–88)
- Known for: Her involvement in the Soble spy ring
- Criminal charge: Conspiracy to receive and obtain national defense information and transmit same to foreign government, 18 U.S.C. § 793
- Criminal penalty: 5 1/2 year prison sentence
- Criminal status: Pardoned
- Spouse: Jack Soble

Myra Soble (March 18, 1904 – 1992), together with her husband Jack Soble, was tried and jailed for her involvement in the Soble spy ring.

== Biography ==
Soble (née Perske) was born on March 18, 1904, in Nikolaev in the Russian Empire (present-day Ukraine). She was the wife of Jack Soble. Myra and Jack were married on November 24, 1927, in Moscow. In early 1928, Myra went to Germany to join Jack, who had gone there shortly after their marriage. Myra returned to Russia after her mother became ill in 1931. In 1933, she and Jack were reunited when he went back to Russia to be with her. Jack and Myra and most of Jack's family left Russia on January 10, 1941, from Vilkaviskis, Lithuania. They traveled to Japan after they were given Japanese visas. Myra and other members of the group entered the United States at San Francisco on September 27, 1941. Jack Soble arrived in San Francisco on October 20, 1941.

On August 9, 1957, Myra received a 5½-year prison sentence for her role in the Soble spy ring, and her husband seven years. On October 8, 1957, Federal Judge Richard H. Levet of the United States District Court for the Southern District of New York reduced her prison sentence from 5½ years to four years. She was transferred to the Alderson Prison for Women, Alderson, West Virginia on November 12, 1957.

On July 5, 1991, President George H. W. Bush granted Myra a presidential pardon for her conviction (conspiracy to receive and obtain national defense information and transmit same to foreign government, 18 U.S.C. § 793).

== See also ==
- List of people pardoned or granted clemency by the president of the United States
