= Boris Morros =

American spy and music conductor (1891–1963)

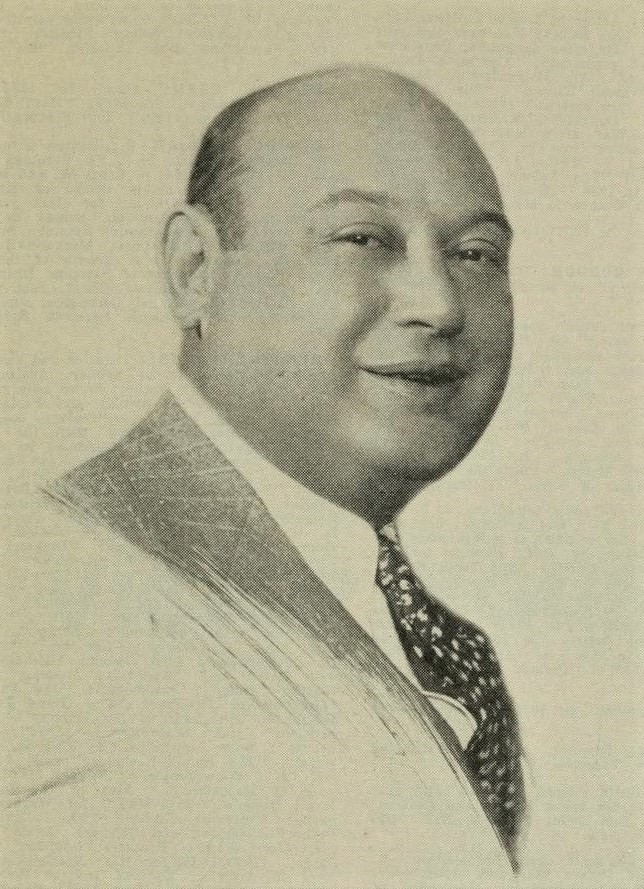
Boris Morros (1937)

Boris Morros (Russian: Борис Михайлович Моррос, romanized: Boris Mikhailovich Morros; January 1, 1891 – January 8, 1963) was an American Communist Party member, Soviet agent, and FBI double agent. He also worked at Paramount Pictures, where he produced films as well as supervising their music department.

== Life and career ==
Morros was born in Saint Petersburg, Russia. He emigrated with his family in late 1922, sailing from the Port of Constantinople to the Port of New York on the S/S Constantinople. In 1934, he was enlisted as a Soviet spy, following which time Vasily Zarubin became his first contact in 1936.

The mysterious "Mr Guver" letter, sent to FBI Director J. Edgar Hoover in 1943 from an anonymous source, who is now widely believed to be KGB Officer Vasily Mironov, named Morros as an agent working with Soviet intelligence and identified Elizabeth Zarubina as Morros' contact.

In December 1943, Zarubina drove with Morros to Connecticut, where they met with Alfred Stern and his wife Martha Dodd Stern. Soviet intelligence wanted to use an investment from the Sterns in Morros' sheet music company to serve as cover for espionage. The Sterns invested $130,000 in the Boris Morros Music Company.

In 1947, Morros became a counterspy for the FBI. He reported on Jack Soble and members of the Soble spy ring, while also passing low-level secrets and misinformation back to Moscow. Morros' codename in Soviet intelligence and the Venona files was "FROST."

As a double-agent for the FBI, Morros solicited funds from the MGB (the Soviet intelligence service) to create a U.S. television network. Like the Boris Morros Music Company, the network would have served as espionage cover, but the MGB never funded the venture.

In 1960, Man on a String, a feature film loosely based on Morros' adventures as a counterspy, was released. Ernest Borgnine played Morros, who co-wrote the screenplay.

Morros, who was employed by Paramount Pictures, worked there in several capacities. His movie production credits include The Flying Deuces (1939) with Laurel and Hardy, and Second Chorus (1940) with Paulette Goddard and Fred Astaire. Morros also worked with Bing Crosby, Ginger Rogers, Martha Raye, and Rudy Vallee. Morros was also the music director at Paramount, where he conducted the music of such composers as George Antheil, among others.

He died in New York City on January 8, 1963.

== Selected filmography ==
- Night of Mystery (1937)
- The Flying Deuces (1939)

== Sources ==
- Boris Morros, My Ten Years as a Counter-Spy (London: Werner Laurie, 1959)
