= Meredith Gardner =

American linguist and codebreaker

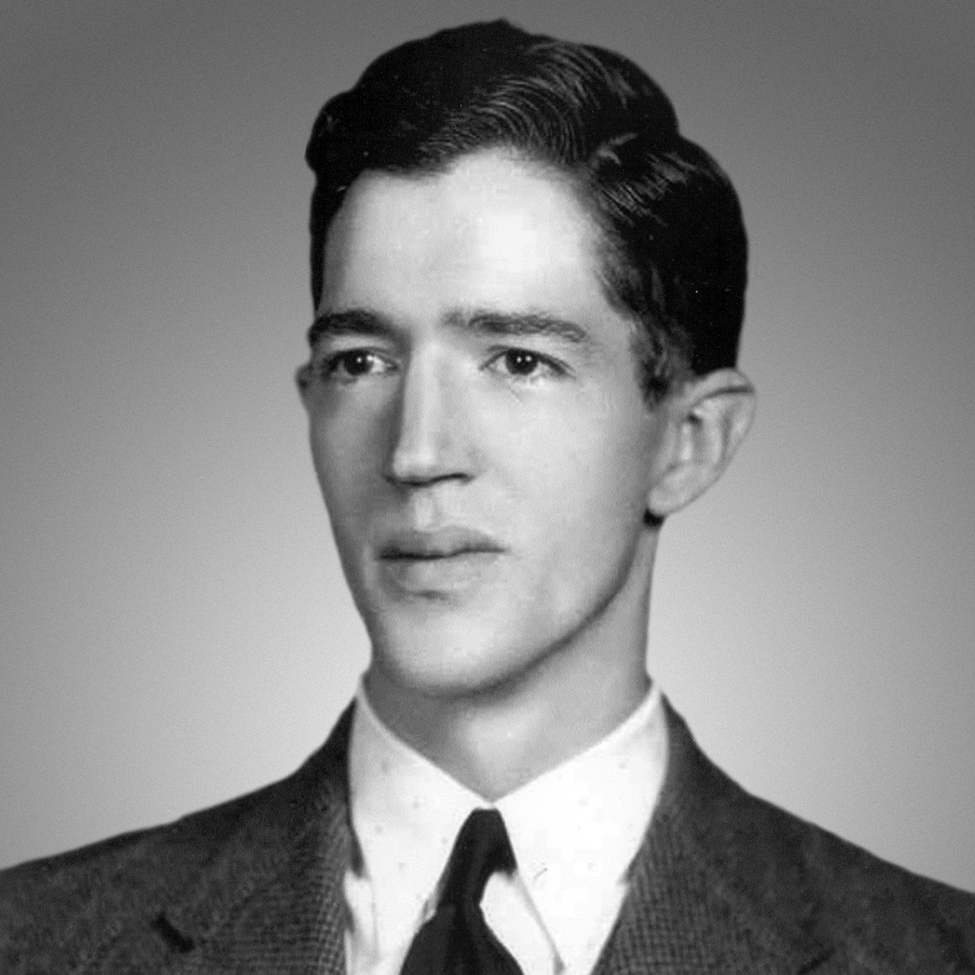
- Born: Meredith Knox Gardner; October 20, 1912; Okolona, Mississippi, U.S.
- Died: August 9, 2002 (aged 89); Chevy Chase, Maryland, U.S.
- Education: University of Texas (B.A.); University of Wisconsin (M.A.)
- Occupations: Linguist, cryptographer
- Years active: 1938–1972
- Employer(s): National Security Agency and its predecessors
- Known for: Decrypting Venona papers, leading to arrest of Julius and Ethel Rosenberg
- Spouse: Blanche Hatfield Gardner
- Children: 2
- Relatives: Patrick Buchanan (cousin)

Meredith Knox Gardner (October 20, 1912 – August 9, 2002) was an American linguist and codebreaker. Gardner worked in counter-intelligence, decoding Soviet intelligence traffic regarding espionage in the United States, in what came to be known as the Venona project.

== Life ==
=== Early life and career ===
Gardner was born in Okolona, Mississippi, and grew up in Austin, Texas. After graduating from the University of Texas at Austin, he earned a master's degree in German from the University of Wisconsin–Madison, where he was a teaching assistant from 1938 to 1940. Gardner was a linguist and professor of German at the University of Akron when the United States Army's Signals Intelligence Service recruited him to work on breaking German codes. Soon after, he started working on the Japanese codes instead, mastering the Japanese language in only a few months. (Note: Gardner spoke German, French, Italian, Spanish, Russian, Lithuanian, and Japanese, and could read Latin, Greek, Sanskrit, Old High German, Middle High German, and Old Church Slavonic.)

=== Venona project ===
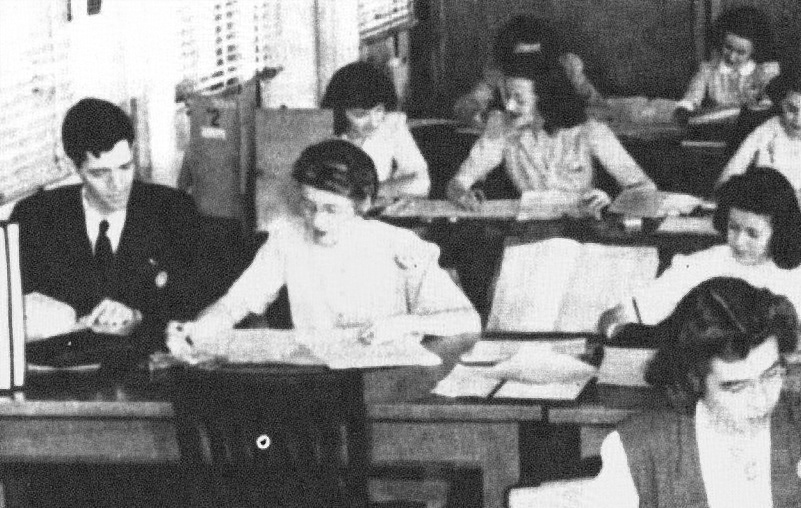
Gardner, at far left, working with cryptanalysts

In 1946, Gardner began work on a highly secret project (later codenamed Venona) to break the Soviet cryptosystems. The Soviet encryption system involved the use of one-time pads, and thus was thought to be unbreakable. However, the Soviets made the mistake of reusing certain pages of their pads.

Later that same year, Gardner made the first breakthrough on Venona by identifying the ciphers used for spelling English words. By May 1947 Gardner had read a decrypt that implied the Soviets ran an agent with access to sensitive information from the War Department General Staff, U.S. Army Air Corps Major William Ludwig Ullmann. It became apparent to Gardner that he was reading KGB messages showing massive Soviet espionage in the United States.

It was not until 1949 that Meredith Gardner made his big breakthrough. He was able to decipher enough of a Soviet message to identify it as the text of a 1945 telegram from Winston Churchill to Harry S. Truman. Checking the message against a complete copy of the telegram provided by the British Embassy, the cryptanalysts confirmed beyond doubt that during the war the Soviets had a spy who had access to secret communication between the president of the United States and the prime minister of Britain.

Peter Wright met Meredith Gardner in London after the arrests of the atom spies: "He was a quiet, scholarly man, entirely unaware of the awe in which he was held by other cryptanalysts. He used to tell me how he worked on the matches in his office, and of how a young pipe-smoking Englishman named Philby used to regularly visit him and peer over his shoulder and admire the progress he was making. Gardner was rather a sad figure by the late 1960s. He felt very keenly that the cryptanalytical break he had made possible was a thing of mathematical beauty, and he was depressed at the use to which it had been put." Wright wrote that Gardner was upset that his research had resulted in McCarthyism and the executions of Julius and Ethel Rosenberg. Wright quotes Gardner as saying: "I never wanted it to get anyone into trouble." Wright added that Gardner "was appalled at the fact that his discovery had led, almost inevitably, to the electric chair, and felt (as I did) that the Rosenbergs, while guilty, ought to have been given clemency. In Gardner's mind, VENONA was almost an art form, and he did not want it sullied by crude McCarthyism."

=== Retirement ===
Gardner retired in 1972, yet his work remained mostly secret until 1996, when the NSA, the CIA, and the Center for Democracy honored Gardner and his colleagues in a formal ceremony that was the result of campaigning by U.S. Senator Daniel Patrick Moynihan.

Gardner died on August 9, 2002, in Chevy Chase, Maryland, at the age of 89. Shortly before his death, he appeared in the PBS documentary Secrets, Lies, and Atomic Spies.
