= Venona project =

American counterintelligence program during World War II and Cold War

The Venona project was a United States counterintelligence program initiated during World War II by the United States Army's Signal Intelligence Service and later absorbed by the National Security Agency (NSA), that ran from February 1, 1943, until October 1, 1980. It was intended to decrypt messages transmitted by the intelligence agencies of the Soviet Union (e.g. the NKVD, the KGB, and the GRU).

During the 37-year duration of the Venona project, the Signal Intelligence Service decrypted and translated approximately 3,000 messages. The signals intelligence yield included discovery of the Cambridge Five espionage ring in the United Kingdom, and also of Soviet espionage of the Manhattan Project in the US, known as Project Enormous. Some of the espionage was undertaken to support the Soviet atomic bomb project. The Venona project remained secret for more than 15 years after it concluded.

== Background ==
During World War II and the early years of the Cold War, the Venona project was a source of information on Soviet intelligence-gathering directed at the Western military powers. Although unknown to the public, and even to Presidents Franklin D. Roosevelt and Harry S. Truman, these programs were of importance concerning crucial events of the early Cold War. These included the Julius and Ethel Rosenberg spying case (which was based on events during World War II) and the defections of Donald Maclean and Guy Burgess to the Soviet Union.

Most decipherable messages were transmitted and intercepted between 1942 and 1945, during World War II, when the Soviet Union was an ally of the US. Sometime in 1945, the existence of the Venona program was revealed to the Soviet Union by cryptologist-analyst Bill Weisband, an NKVD agent in the US Army's SIGINT. These messages were slowly and gradually decrypted beginning in 1946. This effort continued (many times at a low level of effort in the latter years) through 1980, when the Venona program was terminated. The analyst effort assigned to it was moved to more important projects.

To what extent the various individuals referred to in the messages were involved with Soviet intelligence is a topic of minor historical dispute. Most academics and historians have established that most of the individuals mentioned in the Venona decrypts were probably either clandestine assets and/or contacts of Soviet intelligence agents, and very few argue that many of those people probably had no malicious intentions and committed no crimes.

=== Commencement ===
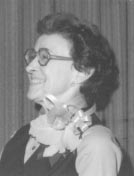
Gene Grabeel, the first cryptanalyst of the Venona project

The VENONA Project was initiated on February 1, 1943, by Gene Grabeel, an American mathematician and cryptanalyst, under orders from Colonel Carter W. Clarke, Chief of Special Branch of the Military Intelligence Service at that time. Clarke distrusted Joseph Stalin, and feared that the Soviet Union would sign a separate peace with Nazi Germany, allowing Germany to focus its military forces against the United Kingdom and the United States. Cryptanalysts of the US Army's Signal Intelligence Service at Arlington Hall analyzed encrypted high-level Soviet diplomatic intelligence messages intercepted in large volumes during and immediately after World War II by American, British, and Australian listening posts. Frank Rowlett was one of the project leaders.

== Decryption ==
This message traffic, which was encrypted with a one-time pad system, was stored and analyzed in relative secrecy by hundreds of cryptanalysts over a 40-year period starting in the early 1940s. When used correctly, the one-time pad encryption system, which has been used for all the most-secret military and diplomatic communication since the 1930s, is unbreakable. However, due to a serious blunder on the part of the Soviets, some of this traffic was vulnerable to cryptanalysis. The Soviet company that manufactured the one-time pads produced around 35,000 pages of duplicate key numbers, as a result of pressures brought about by the German advance on Moscow during World War II. The duplication—which undermines the security of a one-time system—was discovered, and attempts to lessen its impact were made by sending the duplicates to widely separated users. Despite this, the reuse was detected by cryptanalysts in the US.

=== Breakthrough ===
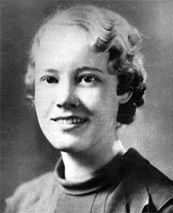
Genevieve Feinstein

The Soviet systems in general used a code to convert words and letters into numbers, to which additive keys (from one-time pads) were added, encrypting the content. When used correctly one-time pad encryption is unbreakable. However, cryptanalysis by American code-breakers revealed that some of the one-time pad material had incorrectly been reused by the Soviets (specifically, entire pages, although not complete books), which allowed decryption of a small part of the traffic.

Generating the one-time pads was a slow and labor-intensive process, and the outbreak of war with Germany in June 1941 caused a sudden increase in the need for coded messages. It is probable that the Soviet code generators started duplicating cipher pages in order to keep up with demand.

It was Arlington Hall's Lieutenant Richard Hallock, working on Soviet "Trade" traffic (so called because these messages dealt with Soviet trade issues), who first discovered that the Soviets were reusing pages. Hallock and his colleagues, amongst whom were Genevieve Feinstein, Cecil Phillips, Frank Lewis, Frank Wanat, and Lucille Campbell, went on to break into a significant amount of Trade traffic, recovering many one-time pad additive key tables in the process.

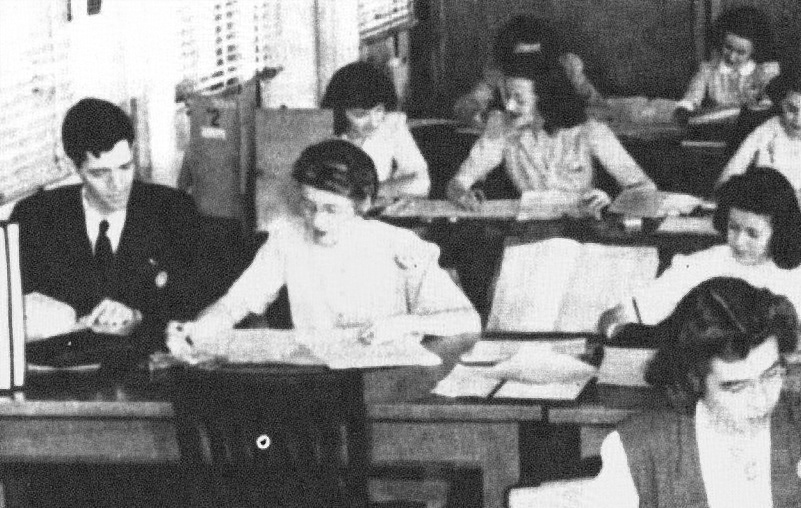
Meredith Gardner (far left); most of the other code breakers were young women.

A young Meredith Gardner then used this material to break into what turned out to be NKVD (and later GRU) traffic by reconstructing the code used to convert text to numbers. Gardner credits Marie Meyer, a linguist with the Signal Intelligence Service with making some of the initial recoveries of the Venona codebook. Samuel Chew and Cecil Phillips also made valuable contributions. On December 20, 1946, Gardner made the first break into the code, revealing the existence of Soviet espionage in the Manhattan Project. Venona messages also indicated that Soviet spies worked in Washington in the State Department, Treasury, Office of Strategic Services (OSS), and even the White House. Very slowly, using assorted techniques ranging from traffic analysis to defector information, more of the messages were decrypted.

Claims have been made that information from the physical recovery of code books (a partially burned one was obtained by the Finns) to bugging embassy rooms in which text was entered into encrypting devices (analyzing the keystrokes by listening to them being punched in) contributed to recovering much of the plaintext. These latter claims are less than fully supported in the open literature.

One significant aid (mentioned by the NSA) in the early stages may have been work done in cooperation between the Japanese and Finnish cryptanalysis organizations; when the Americans broke into Japanese codes during World War II, they gained access to this information. There are also reports that copies of signals stolen from Soviet offices by the Federal Bureau of Investigation (FBI) were helpful in the cryptanalysis. The Finnish radio intelligence sold much of its material concerning Soviet codes to the OSS in 1944 during Operation Stella Polaris, including the partially burned code book.

=== Results ===
The NSA reported that (according to the serial numbers of the Venona cables) thousands of cables were sent, but only a fraction were available to the cryptanalysts. Approximately 2,200 messages were decrypted and translated; about half of the 1943 GRU-Naval Washington to Moscow messages were broken, but none for any other year, although several thousand were sent between 1941 and 1945. The decryption rate of the NKVD cables was as follows:

- 1942: 1.8%
- 1943: 15.0%
- 1944: 49.0%
- 1945: 1.5%

Out of some hundreds of thousands of intercepted encrypted texts, it is claimed under 3,000 have been partially or wholly decrypted. All the duplicate one-time pad pages were produced in 1942, and almost all of them had been used by the end of 1945, with a few being used as late as 1948. After this, Soviet message traffic reverted to being completely unreadable.

The existence of Venona decryption became known to the Soviets within a few years of the first breaks. It is not clear whether the Soviets knew how much of the message traffic or which messages had been successfully decrypted. At least one Soviet penetration agent, British Secret Intelligence Service representative to the US Kim Philby, was told about the project in 1949, as part of his job as liaison between British and US intelligence. Since all of the duplicate one-time pad pages had been used by this time, the Soviets apparently did not make any changes to their cryptographic procedures after they learned of Venona. However, this information allowed them to alert those of their agents who might be at risk of exposure due to the decryption.

=== Significance ===
The decrypted messages gave important insights into Soviet behavior in the period during which duplicate one-time pads were used. With the first break into the code, Venona revealed the existence of Soviet espionage at the Manhattan Project's Site Y (Los Alamos). Identities soon emerged of American, Canadian, Australian, and British spies in service to the Soviet government, including Klaus Fuchs, Alan Nunn May, and Donald Maclean. Others worked in Washington in the State Department, the Treasury, OSS, and even the White House.

The messages show that the US and other nations were targeted in major espionage campaigns by the Soviet Union as early as 1942. Among those identified are Julius and Ethel Rosenberg, Alger Hiss, Harry Dexter White (the second-highest official in the Treasury Department), Lauchlin Currie (a personal aide to Franklin Roosevelt), and Maurice Halperin (a section head in the Office of Strategic Services).

The identification of individuals mentioned in Venona transcripts is sometimes problematic, since people with a "covert relationship" with Soviet intelligence are referenced by cryptonyms. Further complicating matters is the fact the same person sometimes had different cryptonyms at different times, and the same cryptonym was sometimes reused for different individuals. In some cases, notably Hiss, the matching of a Venona cryptonym to an individual is disputed. In many other cases, a Venona cryptonym has not yet been linked to any person. According to authors John Earl Haynes and Harvey Klehr, the Venona transcripts identify approximately 349 Americans who they claim had a covert relationship with Soviet intelligence, though fewer than half of these have been matched to real-name identities. However, not every agent may have been communicating directly with Soviet intelligence. Each of those 349 persons may have had many others working for, and reporting only to, them.

The OSS, the predecessor to the Central Intelligence Agency (CIA), housed at one time or another between fifteen and twenty Soviet spies. Duncan Lee, Donald Wheeler, Jane Foster Zlatowski, and Maurice Halperin passed information to Moscow. The War Production Board, the Board of Economic Warfare, the Office of the Coordinator of Inter-American Affairs, and the Office of War Information, included at least half a dozen Soviet sources each among their employees.

=== Black Friday ===
In late October 1948 the Soviets began changing their ciphers one by one in rapid succession. They also stopped the use of UHF radio links from Germany and Austria to Moscow, using (overhead) landline instead. While Navy investigators thought it was a routine systems upgrade others were not so sure and later it was attributed to two Soviet spies: American William (Bill) Weisband, a linguist at Arlington Hall, and Briton Kim Philby in the SIS.

At this time some information was trickling in from US intercepts and rare overflights near the East-West border; but with a dearth in intelligence, not even a hint was received of the North Korean attack (approved by Stalin) on South Korea in June 1950. This led to the approval of Operation Gold in Berlin, a joint CIA-SIS operation to tap into underground telephone cables a short distance across the border in East Berlin; the scheme was based on Operation Silver, a SIS operation in Vienna.

Operation Gold was betrayed to the NKVD by SIS member George Blake even before it started intercepting in May 1955. But to avoid compromising Blake, it was allowed to continue to April 1956, with knowledge of the project kept inside the NKVD.

== Bearing of Venona on particular cases ==
Venona has added information – some unequivocal, some ambiguous – to several espionage cases. Some known spies, including Theodore Hall and Bill Weisband, were neither prosecuted nor publicly implicated, because the Venona evidence against them was withheld.

=== "19" ===
The identity of the Soviet source cryptonymed "19" remains unclear. According to British writer Nigel West, "19" was Edvard Beneš, president of the Czechoslovak government-in-exile. Military historian Eduard Mark and American authors Herbert Romerstein and Eric Breindel concluded it was Roosevelt's aide Harry Hopkins. According to American authors John Earl Haynes and Harvey Klehr, "19" could be someone from the British delegation to the Washington Conference in May 1943. Moreover, they argue no evidence of Hopkins as an agent has been found in other archives, and the partial message relating to "19" does not indicate whether this source was a spy.

However, Vasili Mitrokhin was a KGB archivist who defected to the United Kingdom in 1992 with copies of large numbers of KGB files. He claimed Harry Hopkins was a secret Soviet agent. Moreover, Oleg Gordievsky, a high-level KGB officer who also defected from the Soviet Union, reported that Iskhak Akhmerov, the KGB officer who controlled the clandestine Soviet agents in the US during the war, had said Hopkins was "the most important of all Soviet wartime agents in the United States".

Alexander Vassiliev's notes identified the source code-named "19" as Laurence Duggan.

=== Julius and Ethel Rosenberg ===
Venona added significant information to the case of Julius and Ethel Rosenberg, making it clear Julius was guilty of espionage, and also showing that Ethel, while not acting as a principal, still acted as an accessory who took part in Julius's espionage activity and played a role in the recruitment of her brother for atomic espionage.

Julius and Ethel Rosenberg also had another connection to a recruit for the Soviets named David Greenglass, who was Ethel's brother and Julius's brother-in-law.

Venona and other recent information has shown that, while the content of Julius' atomic espionage was not as vital to the Soviets as alleged at the time of his espionage activities, in other fields it was extensive. The information Rosenberg passed to the Soviets concerned the proximity fuze, design and production information on the Lockheed P-80 jet fighter, and thousands of classified reports from Emerson Radio.

The Venona evidence indicates unidentified sources code-named "Quantum" and "Pers" who facilitated transfer of nuclear weapons technology to the Soviet Union from positions within the Manhattan Project. According to Alexander Vassiliev's notes from KGB archive, "Quantum" was Boris Podolsky and "Pers" was Russell A. McNutt, an engineer from the uranium processing plant in Oak Ridge.

=== David Greenglass ===
David Greenglass, codename KALIBER, was the brother of Ethel Rosenberg, and would be crucial in the conviction of the Rosenbergs. Greenglass was a former Army machinist who worked at Los Alamos. He was originally meant to replace a soldier who had gone AWOL, and lied on his security clearance in order to gain access onto the project. Once Klaus Fuchs was caught, he gave up Harry Gold, who in turn, gave up Greenglass and his wife, as well as his sister and her husband. During their trial, Greenglass changed his story several times. At first, he didn't want to implicate his sister, but when his wife was threatened, he gave up both of them. According to Gerald Markowitz and Michael Meeropol, "In the Rosenberg-Sobell case, the government relied heavily upon the testimony of Greenglass, who pleaded guilty to conspiracy to commit espionage in exchange for a reduced sentence for himself and no indictment or prosecution for his wife, Ruth, who he alleged had aided him in committing espionage. Greenglass testified that he had passed information about the atom bomb to Gold and Rosenberg, who in turn passed it on to the Russians." In the end, Greenglass was sentenced to 15 years but was released in 1960 after serving only nine and a half.

=== Klaus Fuchs ===
The Venona decryptions were also important in the exposure of the atomic spy Klaus Fuchs. Some of the earliest messages decrypted concerned information from a scientist at the Manhattan Project, who was referred to by the code names of CHARLES and REST. Fuchs had joined the Manhattan Project at Los Alamos in 1944 where he provided information for the development of a plutonium implosion design. He is also credited with being of great assistance to the creation of a Soviet atomic bomb. Fuchs even gave the Soviets the blueprint for the Trinity device that would be detonated at Los Alamos in July 1945. One such message from Moscow to New York, dated April 10, 1945, called information provided by CHARLES "of great value". Noting that the information included "data on the atomic mass of the nuclear explosive" and "details on the explosive method of actuating" the atomic bomb, the message requested further technical details from CHARLES. Investigations based on the Venona decryptions eventually identified CHARLES and REST as Fuchs in 1949. Fuchs was eventually arrested and tried on March 1, 1950, where he confessed to four counts of espionage and received a maximum prison sentence of fourteen years.

=== Harry Gold ===
The Venona decryptions also identified Soviet spy Harry Gold as an agent of the KGB who stole blueprints, industrial formulas, and methods on their behalf from 1935 until ultimately confessing to these actions in 1950. During his years of work under the KGB, Gold operated under the code names GOOSE and ARNOLD. Gold was eager to provide his services after being initially recruited by Thomas Black on behalf of the Amtorg.

In 1935, Gold, with the assistance of Black, gained employment at the Pennsylvania Sugar Company, one of the largest producers of sugar in the world at the time. During his tenure, Gold worked under Semyon Semyonov and Klaus Fuchs. Over time, Gold began to work with Abraham Brothman, a fellow spy who was identified in Gold's confessions for stealing industrial processes on behalf of the Soviet Union and would later be convicted for lying under oath to a grand jury.

Gold's confessions turned out to be a major success for the FBI, as he would unveil a network of spies entrenched in the success of KGB espionage efforts. Along with Brothman, (sentenced to 15 years), David Greenglass, and Julius Rosenberg were all arrested following the interrogations of Gold. With regard to Los Alamos, Fuchs, Greenglass, and Gold all played a role in aiding the Soviet atomic espionage campaign.

=== Alger Hiss and Harry Dexter White ===
According to the Moynihan Commission on Government Secrecy, the complicity of both Alger Hiss and Harry Dexter White is conclusively proven by Venona, stating: "The complicity of Alger Hiss of the State Department seems settled. As does that of Harry Dexter White of the Treasury Department." In his 1998 book, United States Senator Daniel Patrick Moynihan expressed certainty about Hiss's identification by Venona as a Soviet spy, writing: "Hiss was indeed a Soviet agent and appears to have been regarded by Moscow as its most important."

=== Donald Maclean and Guy Burgess ===
Kim Philby had access to CIA and FBI files, and more damaging, access to Venona Project briefings. When Philby learned of Venona in 1949, he obtained advance warning that his fellow Soviet spy Donald Maclean was in danger of being exposed. The FBI told Philby about an agent cryptonymed "Homer", whose 1945 message to Moscow had been decoded. As it had been sent from New York and had its origins in the British Embassy in Washington, Philby, who would not have known Maclean's cryptonym, deduced the sender's identity. By early 1951, Philby knew US intelligence would soon also conclude Maclean was the sender and advised Moscow to extract Maclean. This led to Maclean and Guy Burgess' flight in May 1951 to Moscow, where they lived the remainder of their lives.

=== Guy Burgess ===
Guy Burgess served as a British diplomat during the atom bomb project in the United States. He became a Soviet informant after beginning his studies at the University of Cambridge, where he and his classmates (Kim Philby, Anthony Blunt, and Donald Maclean) began developing ideals against a capitalist society. Burgess began developing connections throughout college as well as his future careers. He would continue to pass on information as a BBC Radio correspondent, an MI6 intelligence officer, and as a member of the British Foreign Office.

When the Korean War began, Burgess and Philby passed on information regarding movements in Korea to Moscow.

Philby had been working closely with British and American intelligence, and was in proximity to intelligence findings. When the VENONA Project uncovered Julius Rosenberg (LIBERAL) and his wife Ethel, the project posted that they knew of a British spy with the codename HOMER, which Philby knew to be Maclean. Philby (codename STANLEY) reached out to Burgess to remove Maclean to the Soviet Union. Burgess at this point, was overseas in Washington DC serving in the British Foreign Office, and couldn't do much. In 1950, he was sent back to Britain due to "bad behavior", where he was able to warn Maclean. Burgess knew he was under suspicion by MI5, British counterintelligence, and Scotland Yard's Special Branch.

Both Philby and Burgess knew that out of all of the possible people to crack under pressure, Maclean was the easy choice. When Burgess finally convinced Maclean to leave, they fled to Moscow, followed by Philby shortly after.

=== Soviet espionage in Australia ===
In addition to British and American operatives, Australians collected Venona intercepts at a remote base in the Australian Outback. The Soviets remained unaware of this base as late as 1950.

The founding of the Australian Security Intelligence Organisation (ASIO) by Labor Prime Minister Ben Chifley in 1949 was considered highly controversial within Chifley's own party. Until then, the left-leaning Australian Labor Party had been hostile to domestic intelligence agencies on civil-liberties grounds and a Labor government founding one seemed a surprising about-face. But the presentation of Venona material to Chifley, revealing evidence of Soviet agents operating in Australia, brought this about. As well as Australian diplomat suspects abroad, Venona had revealed Walter Seddon Clayton (cryptonym "KLOD"), a leading official within the Communist Party of Australia (CPA), as the chief organizer of Soviet intelligence gathering in Australia. Investigation revealed that Clayton formed an underground network within the CPA so that the party could continue to operate if it were banned. In 1950, George Ronald Richards was appointed ASIO's deputy-director of operations for Venona, based in Sydney, charged with investigating intelligence that uncovered the eleven Australians identified in the cables that had been decoded. He continued Venona-related work in London with MI5 from November 1952 and went on to lead Operation Cabin 12, the high-profile 1953–1954 defection to Australia of Soviet spy Vladimir Petrov.

== Public disclosure ==
For much of its history, knowledge of Venona was restricted even from the highest levels of government. Senior army officers, in consultation with the FBI and CIA, made the decision to restrict knowledge of Venona within the government (even the CIA was not made an active partner until 1952). Army Chief of Staff Omar Bradley, concerned about the White House's history of leaking sensitive information, decided to deny President Truman direct knowledge of the project. The president received the substance of the material only through FBI, Justice Department, and CIA reports on counterintelligence and intelligence matters. He was not told the material came from decoded Soviet ciphers. To some degree this secrecy was counter-productive; Truman was distrustful of FBI head J. Edgar Hoover and suspected the reports were exaggerated for political purposes.

Some of the earliest detailed public knowledge that Soviet code messages from World War II had been broken came with the release of Chapman Pincher's book, Too Secret Too Long, in 1984. Robert Lamphere's book, The FBI-KGB War, was released in 1986. Lamphere had been the FBI liaison to the code-breaking activity and had considerable knowledge of Venona and the counter-intelligence work that resulted from it. However, the first detailed account of the Venona project, identifying it by name and making clear its long-term implications in post-war espionage, was contained in MI5 assistant director Peter Wright's 1987 memoir, Spycatcher.

Many inside the NSA had argued internally that the time had come to publicly release the details of the Venona project, but it was not until 1995 that the bipartisan Commission on Government Secrecy, with Senator Moynihan as chairman, released Venona project materials. Moynihan wrote:

[The] secrecy system has systematically denied American historians access to the records of American history. Of late we find ourselves relying on archives of the former Soviet Union in Moscow to resolve questions of what was going on in Washington at mid-century. ... the Venona intercepts contained overwhelming proof of the activities of Soviet spy networks in America, complete with names, dates, places, and deeds.

One of the considerations in releasing Venona translations was the privacy interests of the individuals mentioned, referenced, or identified in the translations. Some names were not released because to do so would constitute an invasion of privacy. However, in at least one case, independent researchers identified one of the subjects whose name had been obscured by the NSA.

The dearth of reliable information available to the public—or even to the President and Congress—may have helped to polarize debates of the 1950s over the extent and danger of Soviet espionage in the United States. Anti-Communists suspected many spies remained at large, perhaps including some known to the government. Those who criticized the governmental and non-governmental efforts to root out and expose Communists in the United States felt these efforts were an overreaction (in addition to other reservations about McCarthyism). Public access—or broader governmental access—to the Venona evidence would certainly have affected this debate, as it is affecting the retrospective debate among historians and others now. As the Moynihan Commission wrote in its final report:

A balanced history of this period is now beginning to appear; the Venona messages will surely supply a great cache of facts to bring the matter to some closure. But at the time, the American Government, much less the American public, was confronted with possibilities and charges, at once baffling and terrifying.

The National Cryptologic Museum features an exhibit on the Venona project in its "Cold War/Information Age" gallery.

== Texas textbook controversy ==
Controversy arose in 2009 over the Texas State Board of Education's revision of their high school history class curricula to suggest Venona evidence shows Senator Joseph McCarthy to have been justified in his zeal in exposing those whom he believed to be Soviet spies or communist sympathizers. Critics of this textbook policy include history professor Harvey Klehr, who asserts most people and organizations identified by McCarthy as possible Soviet assets or sympathizers, such as those brought forward in the Army-McCarthy hearings or rival politicians in the Democratic Party, were not mentioned in the Venona content and that his accusations remain largely unsupported by evidence.

== Critical views ==
Intelligence historian Nigel West believes that "Venona remain[s] an irrefutable resource, far more reliable than the mercurial recollections of KGB defectors and the dubious conclusions drawn by paranoid analysts mesmerized by Machiavellian plots." However, a number of writers and scholars have taken a critical view of the translations. They question the accuracy of the translations and the identifications of cryptonyms that the NSA translations give. Writers Walter and Miriam Schneir, in a lengthy 1999 review of one of the first book-length studies of the messages, object to what they see as the book's overconfidence in the translations' accuracy, noting that the undecrypted gaps in the texts can make interpretation difficult, and emphasizing the problem of identifying the individuals mentioned under cryptonyms. To support their critique, they cite a declassified memorandum, written in 1956 by A. H. Belmont, who was assistant to FBI director J. Edgar Hoover at the time.

In the memo, Belmont discusses the possibility of using the Venona translations in court to prosecute Soviet agents and comes out strongly opposed to their use. His reasons include legal uncertainties about the admissibility of the translations as evidence, and the difficulties that prosecution would face in supporting the validity of the translations. Belmont highlights the uncertainties in the translation process, noting that the cryptographers have indicated that "almost anything included in a translation of one of these deciphered messages may in the future be radically revised". He also notes the complexities of identifying people with cryptonyms, describing how the personal details mentioned for cryptonym "Antenna" fit more than one person, and the investigative process required to finally connect "Antenna" to Julius Rosenberg. The Schneirs conclude that "A reader faced with Venona's incomplete, disjointed messages can easily arrive at a badly skewed impression."

Many of the critiques of the Venona translations have been based on specific cases. The Schneirs' critique of the Venona documents was based on their decades of work on the case of Ethel and Julius Rosenberg. Another critique of the Venona translations came from the late Rutgers University law professor John Lowenthal, who as a law student worked as a volunteer for Alger Hiss's defense team, and later wrote extensively on the Hiss case. Lowenthal's critique focused on one message (Venona 1822 KGB Washington-Moscow 30 March 1945), in which the comments identified the cryptonym 'Ales' as "probably Alger Hiss". Lowenthal raised a number of objections to this identification, rejecting it as "a conclusion psychologically motivated and politically correct but factually wrong". Lowenthal's article led to an extended debate on the 'Ales' message, and even prompted the NSA to declassify the original Russian text. Currently, Venona 1822 is the only message for which the complete decrypted Russian text has been published.

Victor Navasky, editor and publisher of The Nation, has also written several editorials highly critical of Haynes' and Klehr's interpretation of recent work on the subject of Soviet espionage. Navasky claims the Venona material is being used to "distort ... our understanding of the cold war" and that the files are potential "time bombs of misinformation". Commenting on the list of 349 Americans identified by Venona, published in an appendix to Venona: Decoding Soviet Espionage in America, Navasky wrote: "The reader is left with the implication—unfair and unproven—that every name on the list was involved in espionage, and as a result, otherwise careful historians and mainstream journalists now routinely refer to Venona as proof that many hundreds of Americans were part of the red spy network." Navasky goes further in his defense of the listed people and has claimed a great deal of the so-called espionage that went on was nothing more than "exchanges of information among people of good will" and that "most of these exchanges were innocent and were within the law".

According to historian Ellen Schrecker, "Because they offer insights into the world of the secret police on both sides of the Iron Curtain, it is tempting to treat the FBI and Venona materials less critically than documents from more accessible sources. But there are too many gaps in the record to use these materials with complete confidence." Schrecker believes the documents established the guilt of many prominent figures but is still critical of the views of scholars such as Haynes, arguing: "complexity, nuance, and a willingness to see the world in other than black and white seem alien to Haynes' view of history".

== See also ==
- Elizabeth Bentley
- History of Soviet and Russian espionage in the United States
- List of Americans in the Venona papers
- List of Soviet agents in the United States
- Russian State Archive of Socio-Political History

== References and further reading ==
=== Books ===
- Aldrich, Richard J. (2001). The Hidden Hand: Britain, America and Cold War Secret Intelligence. John Murray Pubs Ltd. ISBN 978-0-7195-5426-1.
- Bamford, James (2002). Body of Secrets: Anatomy of the Ultra-Secret National Security Agency. Anchor Books. ISBN 978-0-385-49908-8.
- Benson, Robert Louis (1996). Venona: Soviet Espionage and the American Response 1939–1957. Aegean Park Press. ISBN 978-0-89412-265-1.
- Budiansky, Stephen (2002). Battle of Wits: The Complete Story of Codebreaking in World War II. Free Press. ISBN 978-0-7432-1734-7.
- Haynes, John Earl & Klehr, Harvey (2000). Venona: Decoding Soviet Espionage in America. Yale University Press. ISBN 978-0-300-08462-7.
- Haynes, John Earl; Klehr, Harvey E.; Vassiliev, Alexander (2009). Spies: The Rise and Fall of the KGB in America. New Haven: Yale University Press. ISBN 978-0-300-12390-6.
- Lamphere, Robert J.; Shachtman, Tom (1995). The FBI-KGB War: A Special Agent's Story. Mercer University Press. ISBN 978-0-86554-477-2.
- Modin, Yuri (1994). My Five Cambridge Friends. Ballantine Books. ISBN 0-374-21698-3.
- Schrecker, Ellen (1998). Many Are the Crimes: McCarthyism in America. Little, Brown. ISBN 978-0-316-77470-3.
- Schrecker, Ellen (2006). Cold War Triumphalism: The Misuse of History After the Fall of Communism. New Press. ISBN 978-1-59558-083-2.
- Romerstein, Herbert & Breindel, Eric (2000). The Venona Secrets: Exposing Soviet Espionage and America's Traitors. Regnery Publishing. ISBN 978-0-89526-275-2.
- Theoharis, Athan (2002). Chasing Spies: How the FBI Failed in Counterintelligence But Promoted the Politics of McCarthyism in the Cold War Years. Ivan R. Dee. ISBN 978-1-56663-420-5.
- Trahair, Richard C.S & Miller, Robert (2009). Encyclopedia of Cold War Espionage, Spies, and Secret Operations. Enigma Books. ISBN 978-1-929631-75-9.
- Vogel, Steve (2019). Betrayal in Berlin; the true story of the Cold War's most audacious espionage operation. New York: Custom House/HarperCollins. ISBN 978-0-06-244962-7.
- Warner, Michael (1996). Venona: Soviet Espionage & American Response. Aegean Park Press. ISBN 978-0-89412-265-1.
- West, Diana (2013). American Betrayal. New York: St. Martin's Press. ISBN 978-0-312-63078-2.
- West, Nigel (1999). Venona: The Greatest Secret of the Cold War. Harper Collins. ISBN 978-0-00-653071-8.
- Wright, Peter; Paul Greengrass (1987). Spycatcher: The Candid Autobiography of a Senior Intelligence Officer. Viking. ISBN 978-0-670-82055-9.

=== Online sources ===
- "NSA official Venona site". National Security Agency. Archived from the original on February 3, 2017.
  - Venona PDFs, arranged by date Archived September 18, 2021, at the Wayback Machine (NSA)
- "Selected Venona Messages". Central Intelligence Agency. Archived from the original on June 13, 2007.
- "The American Response to Soviet Espionage". CIA. 1996. Archived from the original on June 13, 2007.
- Daniel Patrick Moynihan, Chairman (1997). "Report of the Commission On Protecting And Reducing Government Secrecy". United States Government Printing Office.
- "MI5 Releases to the National Archives". MI5. Archived from the original on July 10, 2006.
- Naranjo, Denis. "Venona Chronology 1939–1996".
- "Red Files: Interview with Cecil Philips, US Signal Intelligence Service". PBS.
- Benson, Robert Louis (2001). "The Venona Story" (PDF). Fort George G. Meade, Maryland: National Security Agency, Center for Cryptologic History.
  - Robert L. Benson. "The Venona Story". National Security Agency. Archived from the original on April 30, 2004.
- Fox, John F. Jr. (2005). "In the Enemy's House: Venona and the Maturation of American Counterintelligence". FBI. Archived from the original on November 15, 2006.
- Romerstein, Herbert & Breindel, Eric (2000). "Preface to The Venona Secrets". Regnery Publishing. Archived from the original on October 16, 2006.
- "Venona Documents on the Internet Archive". Internet Archive.
- "Secrets, Lies, and Atomic Spies", PBS Transcript, Airdate: February 5, 2002
