= Harold I. Cammer =

American lawyer (1909–1995)

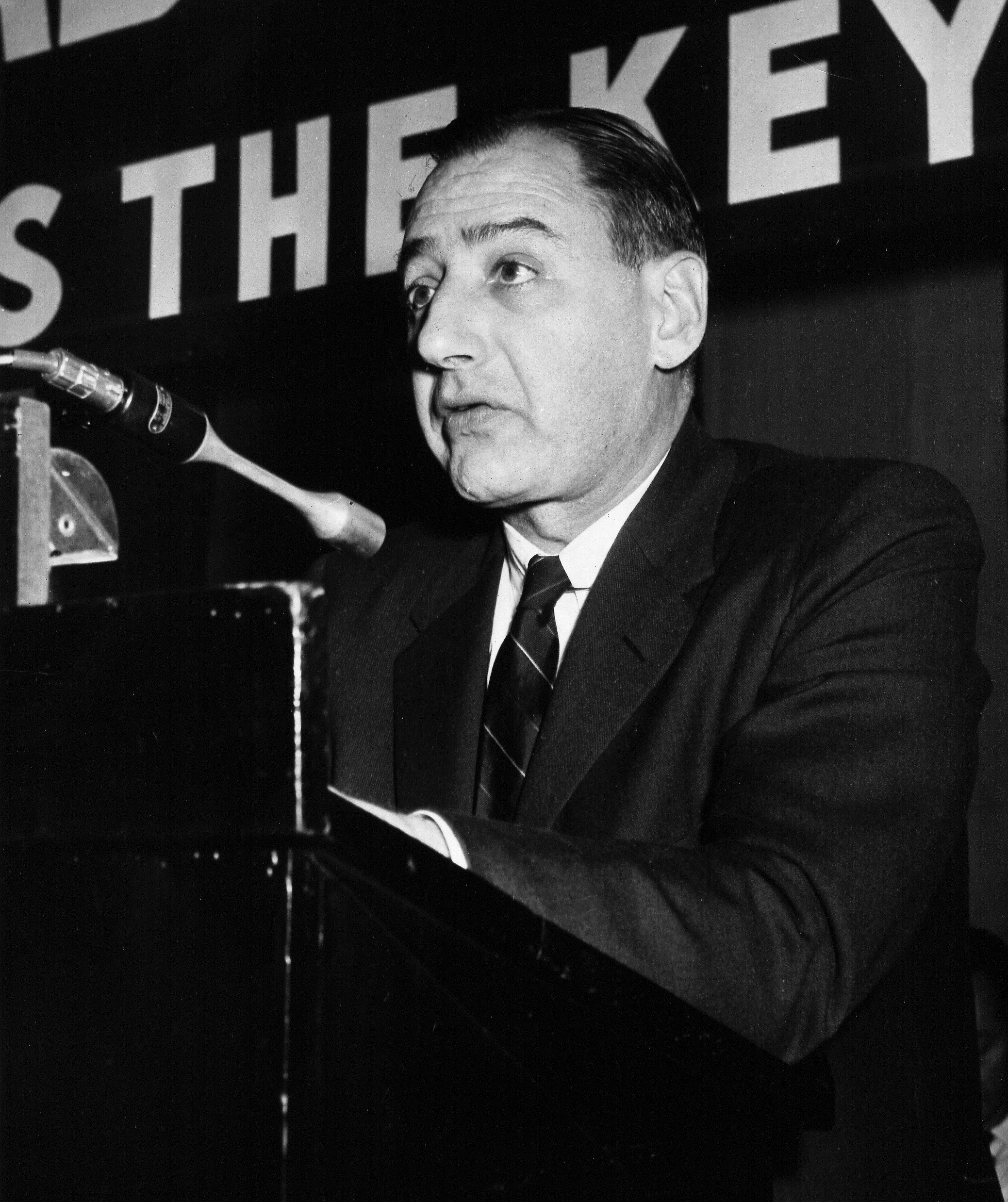
- Cammer speaking at a rally in Atlantic City, N.J.
- Born: June 18, 1909; Manhattan, New York City, New York, U.S.
- Died: October 21, 1995 (aged 86); Mamaroneck, New York, U.S.
- Education: JD Harvard Law School
- Alma mater: City College
- Occupation: Lawyer
- Employer(s): Boudin & Wittenberg (1932–1933), Zalkin & Cohen (1933–1936), Liebman, Robbins, Pressman & Leider (1936–1941), Witt & Cammer (1941-1948), fPressman, Witt & Cammer (1948–1949), Witt & Cammer, Cammer & Shapiro
- Known for: defender of Ware Group members Nathan Witt, Lee Pressman, John Abt
- Notable work: Co-founder National Lawyers Guild
- Spouse: Florence Glantz
- Children: Robert Cammer, Margaret Cammer

Harold I. Cammer (June 18, 1909 – October 21, 1995) was an American lawyer who co-founded the National Lawyers Guild. He was known for his participation in labor law, civil rights, peace and justice issues, and freedom of speech cases; in particular, defending those accused of communist leanings.

== Background ==
Cammer was born in June 1909 in the borough of Manhattan in New York City to Harry and Anne (Boriskin) Cammer, Jewish immigrants from the Russian Empire. He attended New York City public schools and received a Bachelor of Arts degree in 1929 from City College. He attended Harvard Law School on a full scholarship, receiving a Juris Doctor degree (cum laude) in 1932.

== Career ==
=== New Deal ===
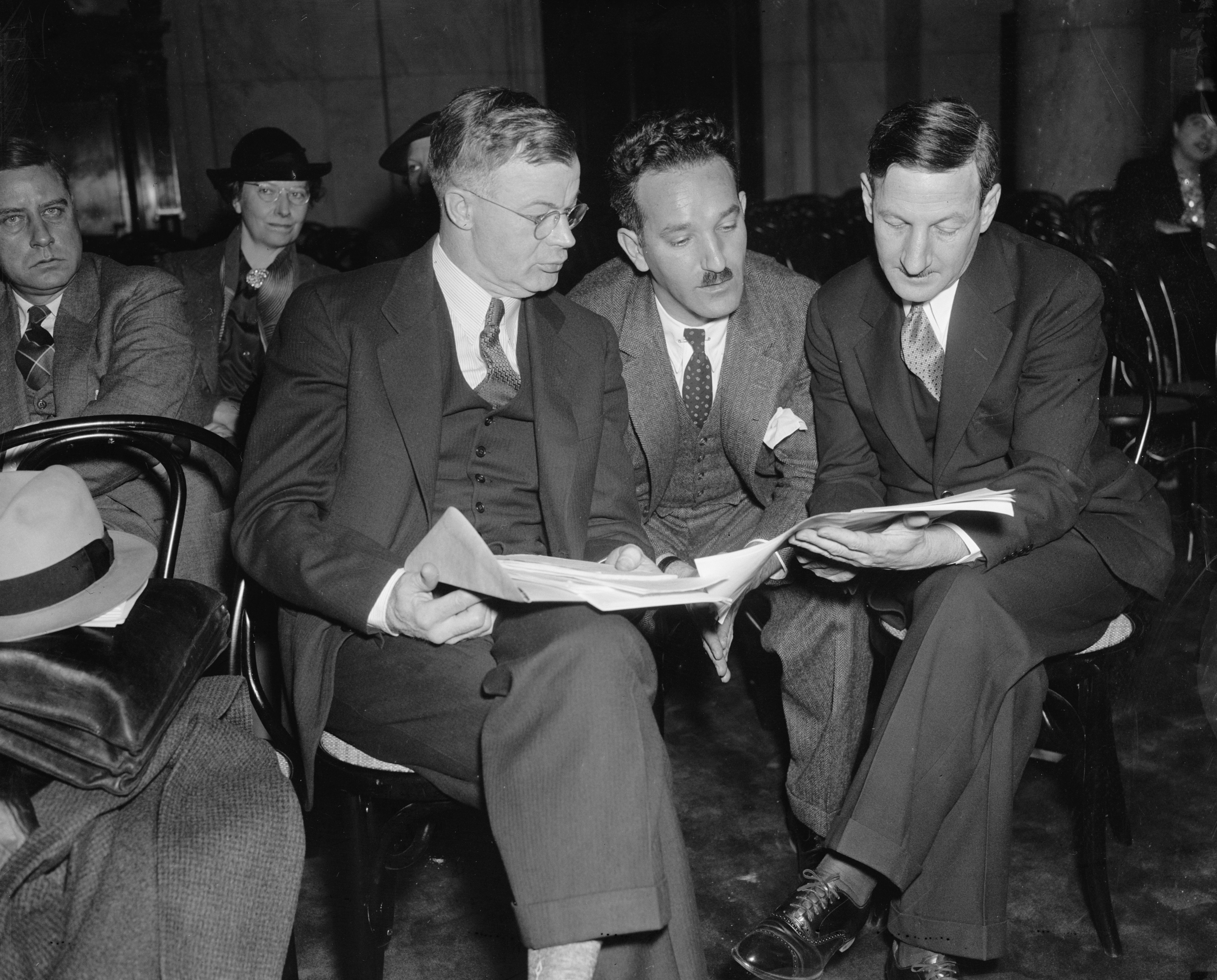
Nathan Witt (center), Cammer's future partner, with NLRB Chair J. Warren Madden (left) and NLRB Chief Counsel Charles Fahy (right) (1937)

Cammer began practicing law with the firm of Boudin & Wittenberg from 1932 to 1933, and Zalkin & Cohen from 1933 to 1936. In 1936, he joined his long-time friend Lee Pressman in the firm of Liebman, Robbins, Pressman & Leider, and stayed with the firm until 1941. After his friend, Nathan Witt, resigned from the National Labor Relations Board following accusations in December 1940 that he was a member of the Communist Party (CPUSA), Cammer formed the law firm of Witt & Cammer in 1941.

Clients included: the Congress of Industrial Organizations (CIO); the Joint Board, Fur, Leather & Machine Workers Union; the Brewery Workers' Union (now International Union of United Brewery, Flour, Cereal, Soft Drink and Distillery Workers, New York Teachers Union, and Amalgamated Meat Cutters union.

=== WWII ===
Cammer interrupted his legal career to serve in the United States military during World War II.

=== Hiss Case etc. ===
After the war, Cammer returned to the firm of Witt & Cammer. (On November 24, 1947, the address for "Witt & Cammer, Esqs." was 9 East 40th Street, New York, NY.)

During 1948, Pressman formed Pressman, Witt & Cammer. Bella Abzug started her career there.

On August 20, 1948, Cammer represented Ware Group members Witt, Pressman, and John Abt before HUAC, less than a week before on the famous "Confrontation Day" hearing of HUAC in which Alger Hiss and Whittaker Chambers faced each other publicly for the first time. Chambers described the day as follows:

On August 10th, a trio of witnesses collectively more interesting than [Henry] Collins appeared before the Committee. They were Lee Pressman, who had been a member of the Ware Group, Nathan Witt and John Abt, each of whom, in succession, had been its head. Witt and Abt were now law partners in New York City. Each was accompanied at his hearing by an attorney, Mr. Harold Cammer, a partner in the law firm of Nathan, Witt and Cammer.

The firm changed its name briefly to Pressman, Witt & Cammer after Lee Pressman joined in 1948, But Pressman became caught up in the Hiss Case. HUAC began investigating Pressman and Witt (also a member of the group) and the stress began to wear Pressman down, even causing him to become paranoid to a degree. Pressmen left the firm peremptorily in 1949. Testifying again before HUAC in 1950, Pressman named Witt as a member of the CPUSA and the Ware group. Cammer represented Witt and fellow attorney John Abt before HUAC in the 1950 hearings.

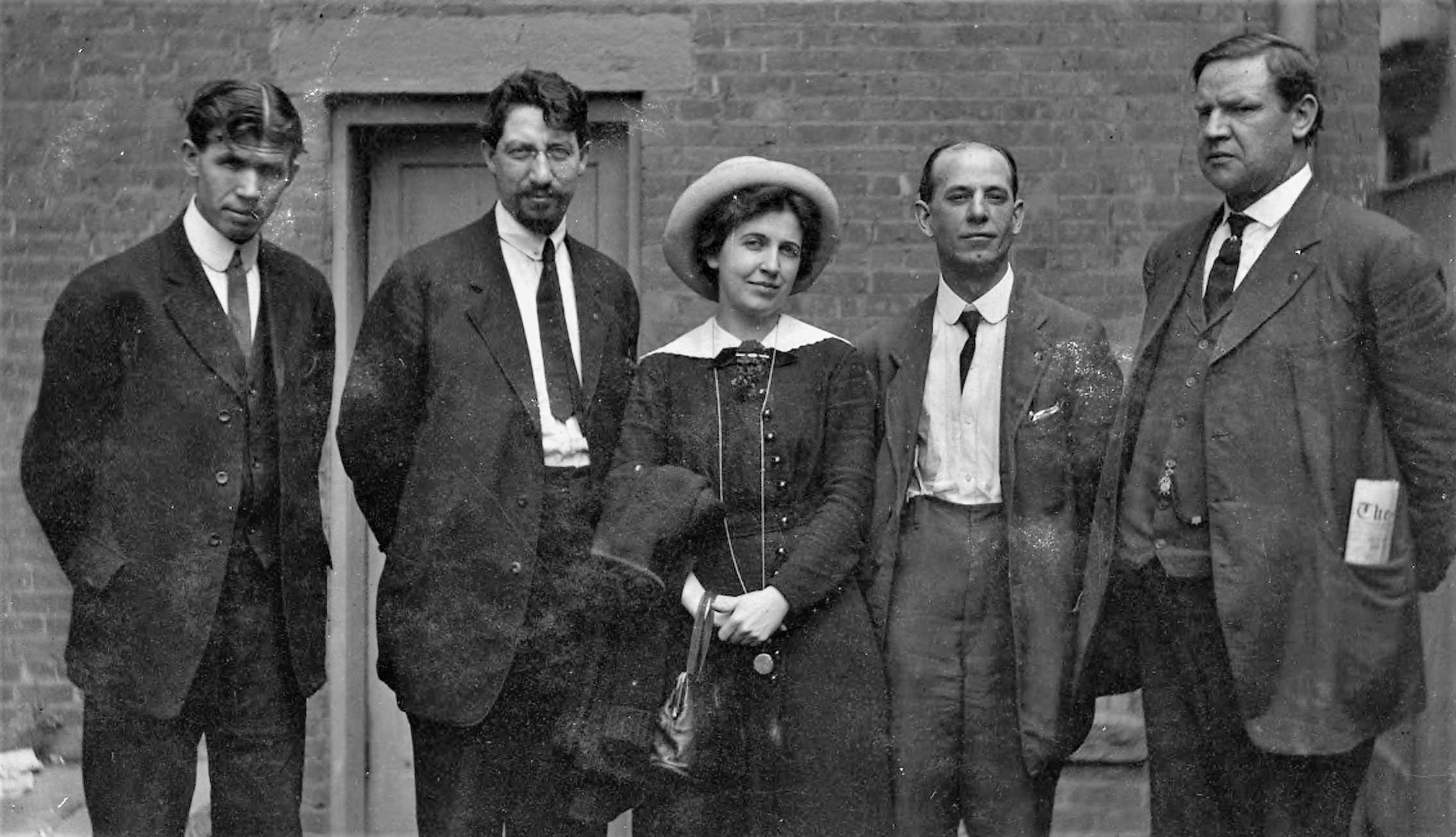
Cammer's client Elizabeth Gurley Flynn, shown here (center) in 1913 photo with Paterson silk strike leaders Patrick Quinlan and Carlo Tresca left and Adolph Lessig and Bill Haywood right

In 1951, Cammer joined more than half a dozen other lawyers in defending 17 Communist Party members, including Elizabeth Gurley Flynn. The communists were accused of charged conspiring to "teach and advocate violent overthrow" of the government. The other lawyers were: Abraham L. Pomerantz, Carol Weiss King, Victor Rabinowitz, Michael Begun, Mary Kaufman, Leonard Boudin, and Abraham Unger. Later, they were relieved by O. John Rogge, gangster Frank Costello's lawyer George Wolf, William W. Kleinman, Joseph L. Delaney, Frank Serri, Osmond K. Fraenkel, Henry G. Singer, Abraham J. Gellinoff, Raphael P. Koenig, and Nicholas Atlas.

=== Later career ===
Cammer's legal practice focused on labor law. Among his clients were the Congress of Industrial Organizations (CIO), the United Brewery Workers union, the Teachers Guild (a forerunner to the United Federation of Teachers of New York City), the Teachers Union (a local union which had been ejected by the American Federation of Teachers for being communist-dominated and which, in the 1950s, belonged to the United Public Workers of America), the International Union of Mine, Mill and Smelter Workers, the International Fur & Leather Workers Union, the Bakery, Confectionery and Tobacco Workers union, the International Woodworkers of America, the United Public Workers of America, and the Amalgamated Meat Cutters. In 1945, he also helped represent the Seamen's Joint Action Committee, a CIO-backed insurgent group which allied with three CIO longshoremen's unions to challenge corrupt International Longshoremen's Association president Joseph Ryan. In many cases, he represented union members and others who had been accused of being members of the CPUSA or harboring communist views. In 1968, Cammer played a different role in labor union issues. He served as the New York City Public Schools trial examiner in a case involving several teachers disciplined outside the collective bargaining agreement with the United Federation of Teachers. His involvement was part of the circumstances which led to the Ocean Hill-Brownsville strike.

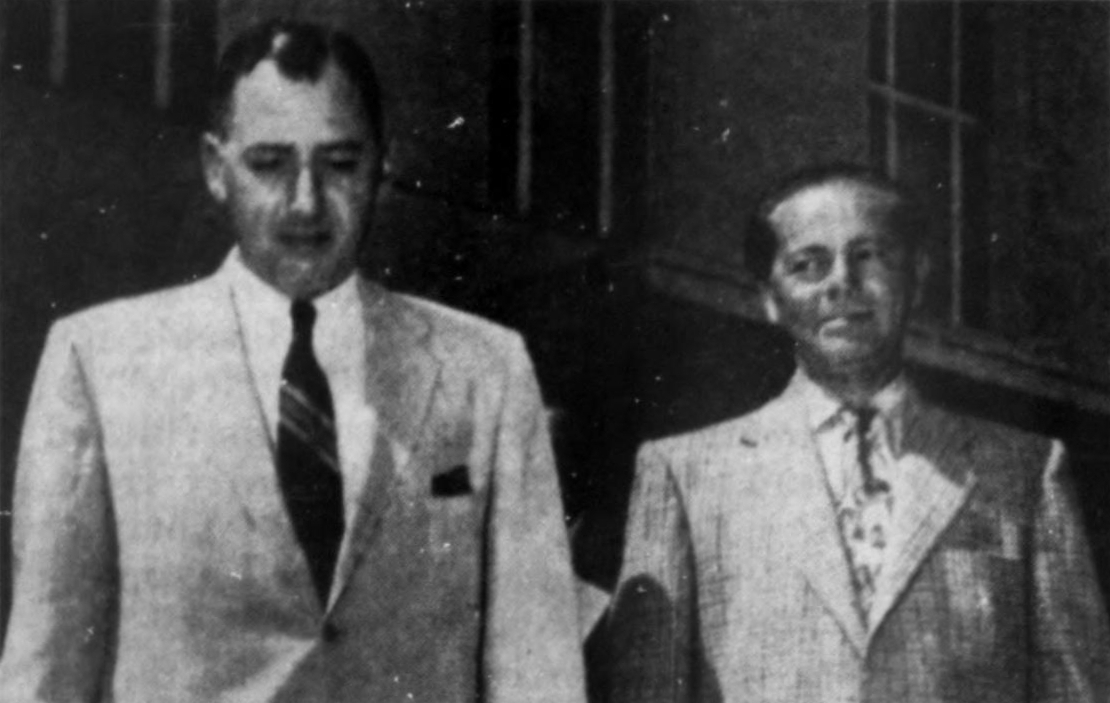
Cammer (left) and his client Ben Gold leave the District Court in Washington, D.C. c. October 1953

Cammer was chief defense counsel for Fur and Leather Workers' Union President Ben Gold after Gold was accused of lying when he submitted his Taft-Hartley Act-required anti-communist oath. Cammer was held in contempt of court in June 1954 for sending a questionnaire to potential grand jurors in the case. Although Cammer lost his appeal, a unanimous Supreme Court of the United States overturned his conviction in Cammer v. United States, 350 U.S. 399 (1956).

In 1955, when Witt left the firm to become full-time counsel to the International Union of Mine, Mill and Smelter Workers, Ralph Shapiro (November 10, 1916 – January 9, 2014), a graduate of City College of New York and University of Michigan Law, as well as member of the American Labor Party and National Lawyers Guild, was elevated to partner, so Cammer's firm changed its name to Cammer & Shapiro.

In 1978-1979, Cammer & Shapiro were working for the Joint Board, Fur, Leather & Machine Workers Union (see International Fur & Leather Workers Union, Ben Gold, Henry Foner).

Cammer retired from an active legal practice in the mid-1980s.

== Associations ==
In 1937, Cammer was one of the co-founders of the National Lawyers Guild, the nation's first racially integrated bar association and an organization dedicated to achieving economic, racial, and social justice through the legal system.

The National Lawyers Guild was branded a communist front by the Federal Bureau of Investigation, the United States Department of Justice, and (later) the House Un-American Activities Committee (HUAC).

== Pro Bono ==
Cammer was interested in more than labor law issues. He worked as a pro bono attorney in the civil rights movement during the 1950s and 1960s. He also defended nearly 700 students arrested during the Columbia University protests of 1968. Cammer and his son, Robert Cammer (also an attorney) were members of the Lawyers Committee on American Policy Towards Vietnam. In 1965, they wrote a widely circulated memorandum entitled "American Policy Vis-a-Vis Vietnam" which concluded that American involvement in the Vietnam War was illegal.

== Personal life and death ==
Cammer married the former Florence Glantz on January 25, 1936; the couple had two children, Robert and Margaret, who was New York State Acting Supreme Court Judge and former Deputy Administrative Judge of the New York City Civil Court, as well as spouse of American painter Joan Snyder.

Harold I. Cammer died age 86 on October 21, 1995, at his home in Mamaroneck, New York; he was survived by his wife, son, daughter, grandson, and two great-granddaughters.

== Legacy ==
Cammer's papers are held at the Tamiment Library and Robert F. Wagner Archives at New York University.

== See also ==
- Lee Pressman
- Nathan Witt
- John Abt
- Alger Hiss
- Whittaker Chambers
- National Lawyers Guild
- House Un-American Activities Committee
