= Victor Rabinowitz =

American lawyer (1911–2007)

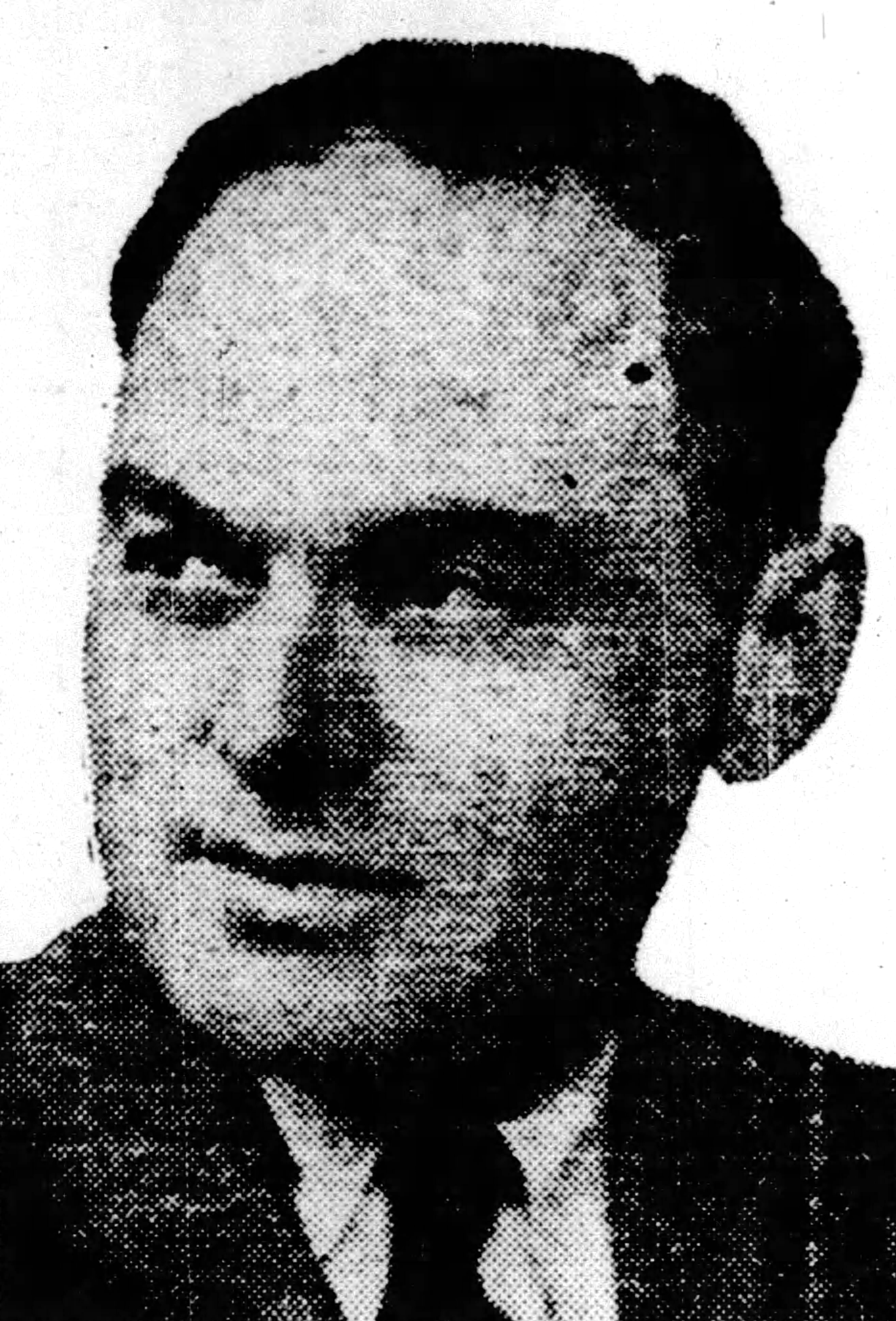
- Rabinowitz c. 1947
- Born: July 2, 1911; Brooklyn, New York, U.S.
- Died: November 16, 2007 (aged 96); Manhattan, New York, U.S.
- Education: University of Michigan (BA); University of Michigan Law School (JD)
- Occupation: Lawyer
- Political party: Communist Party USA; American Labor Party
- Spouse(s): Marcia Goldberg (div. 1967) Joanne Grant (m. 1967; died 2005)
- Children: 2

Victor Rabinowitz (July 2, 1911 – November 16, 2007) was a 20th-century American lawyer known for representing high-profile dissidents and leftist causes.

== Background ==
Rabinowitz was born in Brooklyn, New York into a Jewish family. His parents were Rose (née Netter) and Louis M. Rabinowitz, a factory owner who had emigrated from Lithuania. Despite running a prosperous business, Louis was "a committed socialist" and Victor was raised in a leftist household. He later wrote about his childhood: "I cannot remember a time when I did not believe that trade unions were a good thing."

After attending Brooklyn's Boys High School, he graduated from the University of Michigan with a BA in 1931, and from the University of Michigan Law School with a JD in 1934. He was admitted to the New York bar in 1935.

== Career ==
=== Rabinowitz and Boudin law firm ===
Rabinowitz was hired right out of law school by the small New York City firm of Hays, Podell and Shulmman. Rabinowitz worked there as a law clerk until mid-1938 when he followed Ben Algase, a junior partner, into Louis B. Boudin's firm, which was active in labor law. In his 1996 autobiography, Rabinowitz wrote that Algase "was some variety of left-winger and saw a good prospect in me, questioned me thoroughly on my political and social views and finally said that a young lawyer with my political outlook could help in the progressive movement, which needed lawyers badly."

In 1944, Rabinowitz formed a new law firm with Boudin's nephew Leonard Boudin. Initially known as Rabinowitz and Boudin, it was renamed Rabinowitz, Boudin and Standard in 1959, and after that became the present-day firm of Rabinowitz, Boudin, Standard, Krinsky & Lieberman. The firm's papers, held by the Tamiment Library of New York University, describe its history as follows:

The firm represented numerous labor unions, most notably the American Communications Association, and assisted clients in passport cases, loss of employment and other legal matters arising from the targeting of individuals in government security investigations. The firm has been deeply involved in civil rights work and, during the Vietnam War, successfully defended, on First Amendment grounds, some of the leading opponents of the war, as well as draft resisters and conscientious objectors.

Notable clients included Julian Bond, Paul Robeson, Alger Hiss, Benjamin Spock, Daniel Ellsberg, Jimmy Hoffa, the Fellowship of Reconciliation, and Church of Scientology. Rabinowitz estimated that he represented 225 witnesses before the House Un-American Activities Committee. His law firm also represented the Chilean government under Salvador Allende, and the post-revolutionary Cuban government; it was Cuba's only U.S. legal counsel in all U.S.-related matters.

In November 1947 in a special election to fill a vacancy in New York's 14th congressional district, Rabinowitz ran as the American Labor Party candidate against Republican candidate Jacob P. Lefkowitz and Democratic/Liberal Party candidate Abraham J. Multer. The House seat became open after the resignation of Leo F. Rayfiel, who had been appointed a U.S. district judge. Multer won the election with 58%, and Rabinowitz came in second with 25%.

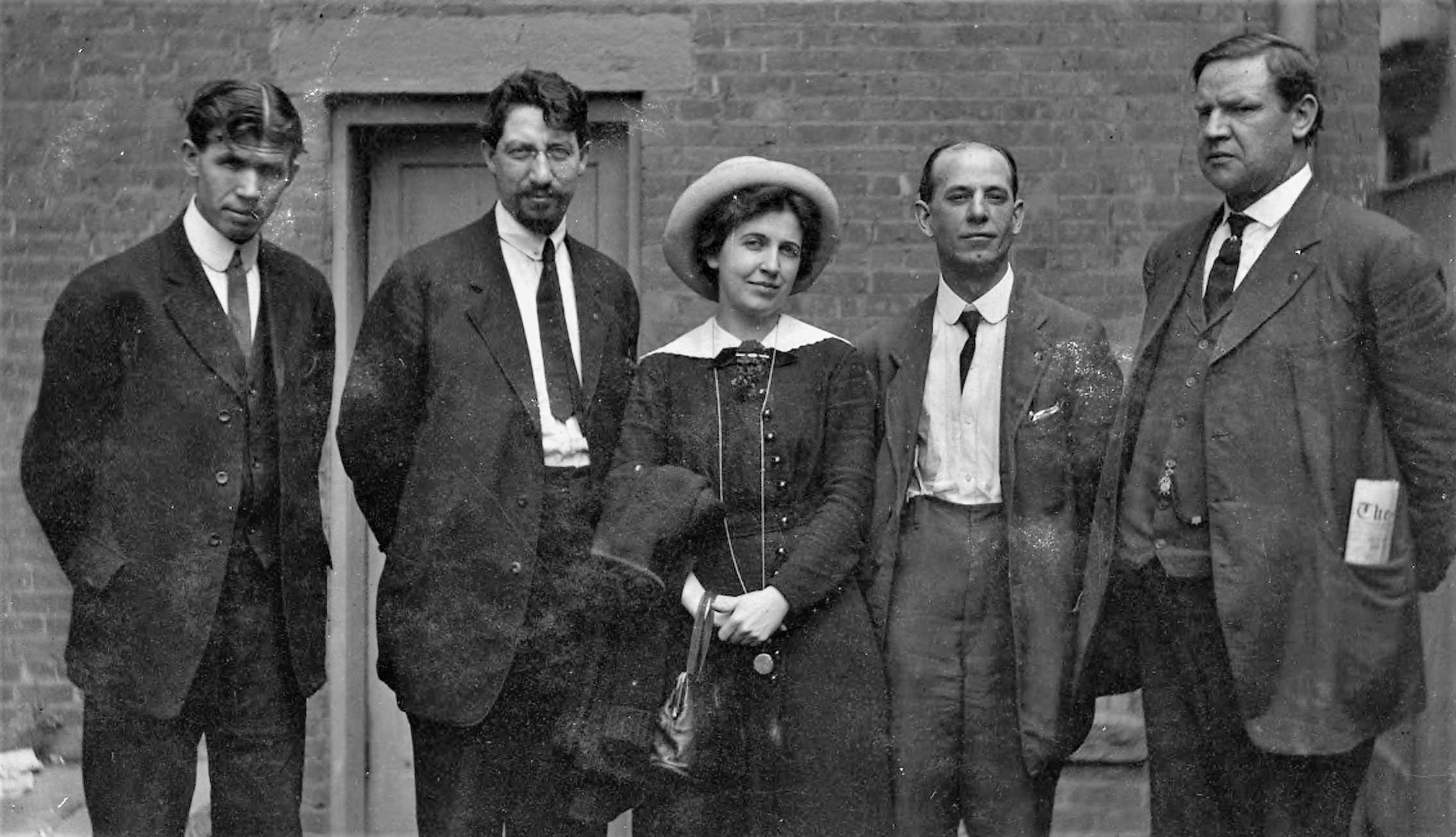
Rabinowitz's client Elizabeth Gurley Flynn (center) in a 1913 photo with Paterson silk strike leaders Patrick Quinlan and Carlo Tresca left, and Adolph Lessig and Bill Haywood right

In 1951, Rabinowitz joined more than half a dozen lawyers in defending 17 Communist Party members, including Elizabeth Gurley Flynn. The communists were accused of conspiring to "teach and advocate violent overthrow" of the government. The other lawyers were: Abraham L. Pomerantz, Carol Weiss King, Michael Begun, Harold I. Cammer, Mary Kaufman, Leonard Boudin, and Abraham Unger. They were subsequently relieved by O. John Rogge, William W. Kleinman, Joseph L. Delaney, Frank Serri, Osmond K. Fraenkel, Henry G. Singer, Abraham J. Gellinoff, Raphael P. Koenig, Nicholas Atlas, and Frank Costello's lawyer George Wolf.

In 1963, when his daughter Joni was convicted of perjury in connection with her work in Albany, Georgia for the Student Nonviolent Coordinating Committee (SNCC), Rabinowitz won her release on the grounds that the local black population was systematically excluded from grand juries.

Rabinowitz argued multiple cases before the U.S. Supreme Court, including several involving First Amendment issues. He filed an amicus brief on behalf of the National Emergency Civil Liberties Committee in the 1971 Pentagon Papers case, New York Times Co. v. United States.

He later described a sharp disagreement that arose within the law firm in 1973 over a new case being offered:

It challenged a somewhat fundamental view I had always had as to my role as a lawyer. I had always adhered to a few basic rules. I would not represent a landlord against a tenant; I would not represent a drug dealer; I would not represent an employer against a union; I would not represent a fascist or right-wing institution. This sounds a bit sanctimonious, and I don't mean to preach, but these were the parameters beyond which I was unwilling to go. The case then being offered was a criminal charge that a union organizer had taken a bribe from an employer to enter into a "sweetheart" contract. I was convinced that the defendant was guilty and that this was an antiunion cause. I urged the office to reject it. Leonard disagreed. After quite a bit of discussion, the office voted not to represent the defendant.

In 1984, Rabinowitz played an "important role in anchoring the defense" when Kathy Boudin—Weather Underground member and daughter of Leonard Boudin—pled guilty to murder as part of an armored truck robbery.

=== Associations ===
In the late 1930s, Rabinowitz was a member of the Communist-created legal defense organization, the International Labor Defense (ILD). He helped found the National Lawyers Guild in 1937 and served two terms as its national president from 1967 to 1970.

From 1942 until the early 1960s, he was a member of the Communist Party USA.

During the 1940s, he was active in the Brooklyn branch of the American Labor Party (ALP), briefly serving as its chairman, and ran for a House seat in Brooklyn on the ALP ticket.

After his father died in 1957, Victor became a trustee of the Louis M. Rabinowitz Foundation, which had been launched in 1944. Although the foundation was primarily research-oriented, it also funded political activists and left-wing scholars. A 1967 FBI file showed that the foundation supported Civil Rights leader Floyd McKissick. In 1963 the foundation gave over $40,000 to help SNCC finance a voter registration drive. Rabinowitz wrote, "At some time in the sixties, the Internal Revenue Service (IRS) raised some question as to whether the foundation was engaged in political activity."

== Personal life and death ==
Rabinowitz was married twice, first to the former Marcia Goldberg of Brooklyn. Following their divorce in 1967, he married filmmaker, journalist and author Joanne Grant. They had a son, Mark, and a daughter, Abby.

Victor Rabinowitz died at his Manhattan home on November 16, 2007. He was 96.

== Legacy ==
Rabinowitz is remembered as a prominent civil liberties and labor lawyer from the McCarthy and Civil Rights eras. His high-profile U.S. Supreme Court cases helped define the legal interpretation of the First Amendment. In a review of his 1996 autobiography, John Mage wrote that the cases handled by the Rabinowitz and Boudin law firm represent "a pretty thorough and continuing history of political struggle and repression in the United States over the past fifty years. It is a record unmatched by any other law firm in the country; there isn't even a close second."

== Published works ==
- Tiger, Edith, ed. (1979). In Re Alger Hiss: Petition for a Writ of Error Coram Nobis. Vol. 2. Hill and Wang. OCLC 4494507. Includes the memorandum and exhibits in support of Alger Hiss's petition, prepared by Victor Rabinowitz for the National Emergency Civil Liberties Foundation.
- Rabinowitz, Victor (1996). Unrepentant Leftist: A Lawyer's Memoir. ISBN 978-0252022531.

== Notable clients ==
- Salvador Allende
- Philip Berrigan
- Julian Bond
- Kathy Boudin
- Fidel Castro
- Daniel Ellsberg
- Elizabeth Gurley Flynn
- Raúl Roa García
- Dashiell Hammett
- Alger Hiss
- Jimmy Hoffa
- Rockwell Kent
- Steve Nelson
- Paul Robeson
- Carlos Rafael Rodríguez
- Benjamin Spock
- American Communications Association
- Black Panther Party
- Church of Scientology
- Fellowship of Reconciliation

== See also ==
- Leonard Boudin
- Louis B. Boudin
- Louis M. Rabinowitz
