= Abraham Unger =

American lawyer

Abraham Unger (1899–1975) was a 20th-Century American lawyer, co-founder and officer of the National Lawyers Guild, and partner in the law firm of Freedman and Unger. Defendants included: Communist Party (CPUSA), state-level Party organizations, individual Communist and Progressive activists, radical and/or Communist-associated labor unions and their leaders and activists, Puerto Rican nationalists, and fellow lawyers charged with contempt and other crimes in connection with their defense of radicals. Colleague Victor Rabinowitz noted in his memoir that Unger was "a lawyer who frequently represented the Communist party."

== Education ==
Unger graduated from New York University's Law School.

== Career ==
In 1931, Unger worked for the defense of the Scottsboro Boys as a member of the International Labor Defense (ILD), a branch of the CPUSA.

In 1937, he helped co-found the National Lawyers Guild (NLG), served as a national officer, and headed its New York chapter for many years. An investigative report on the NLG showed Unger as a national executive board member for 1949 and 1950.

In 1949, he defended some of the twelve Party leaders in the Smith Act trials (charged with conspiring to advocate violent overthrow of the U.S. government).

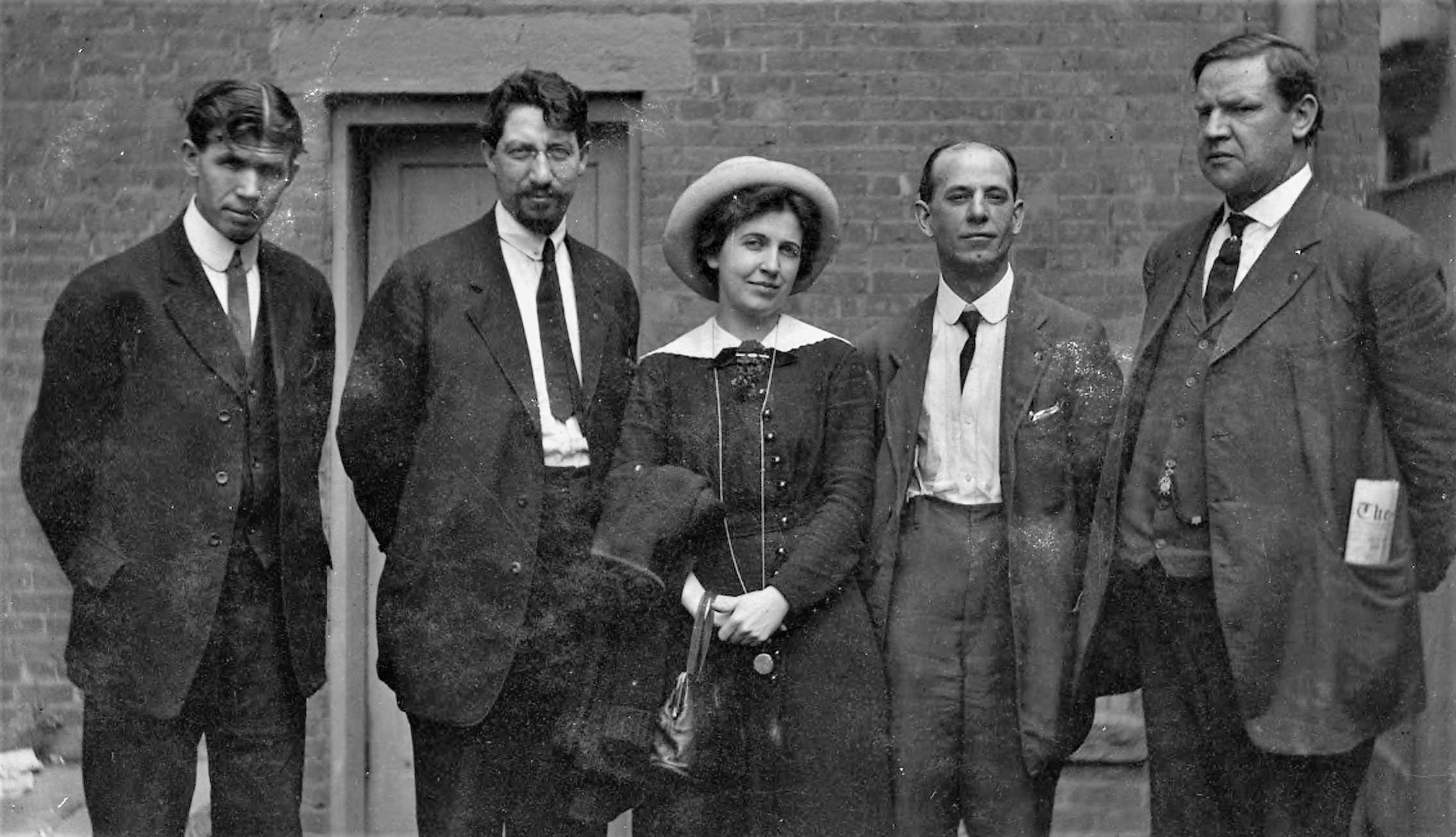
Carol Weiss King's client Elizabeth Gurley Flynn, shown here (center) in 1913 photo with Paterson silk strike leaders Patrick Quinlan and Carlo Tresca left and Adolph Lessig and Bill Haywood right

In 1951, Unger joined more than half a dozen other lawyers in defending 17 Communist Party members, including Elizabeth Gurley Flynn. The communists were accused of conspiring to "teach and advocate violent overthrow" of the government. The other lawyers were: Abraham L. Pomerantz, Carol Weiss King, Victor Rabinowitz, Michael Begun, Harold I. Cammer, Mary Kaufman, and Leonard Boudin. Later, they were relieved by O. John Rogge, gangster Frank Costello's lawyer George Wolf, William W. Kleinman, Joseph L. Delaney, Frank Serri, Osmond K. Fraenkel, Henry G. Singer, Abraham J. Gellinoff, Raphael P. Koenig, and Nicholas Atlas.

In 1952, he petitioned for the commutation of Oscar Collazo’s life sentence for his attempted assassination of U.S. President Harry S. Truman.

In 1953, he faced indictment for contempt, specifically refusing to answer questions from Senator Joseph McCarthy before the U.S. Senate Permanent Subcommittee on Investigations (currently called the "United States Senate Homeland Security Permanent Subcommittee on Investigations"). He also would not respond as to whether he headed the Party's section for professionals.

In the mid-1950s, he defended Puerto Rican nationalist Juan Bernardo Lebron, charged as a conspirator in the 1954 attack on the U.S. House of Representatives.

== Personal and death ==
Rabinowitz's circle of Communist-leaning lawyer friends included Unger, Harry Sacher, David Freedman, David Rein, Joseph Forer, and Marty Popper.

Like Popper, Unger defaulted to invocation of the Fifth Amendment as a standard operating procedure for clients.

== See also ==
- National Lawyers Guild
