= O. John Rogge =

American attorney and civil servant

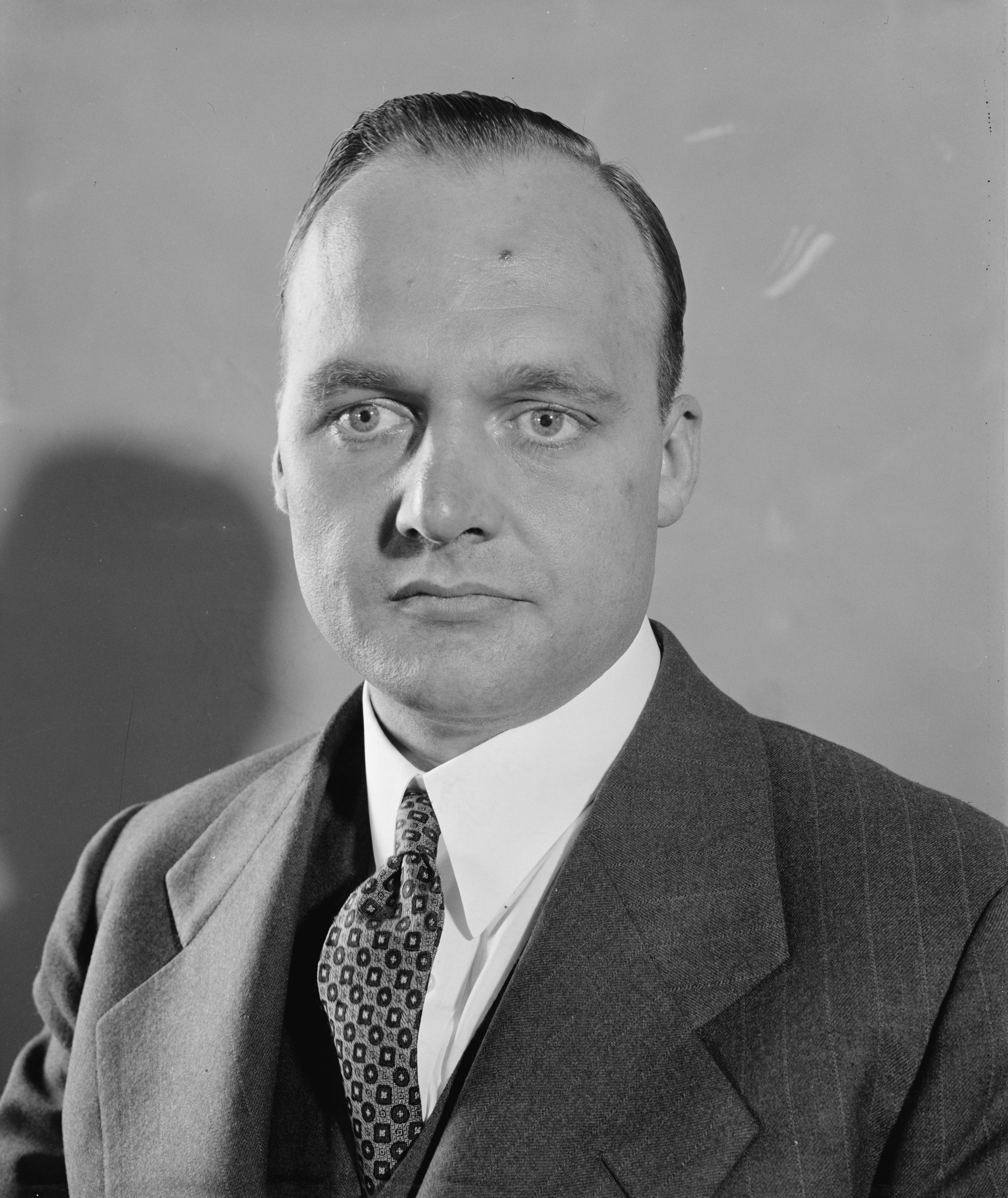
- Rogge at the time of his nomination by President Franklin D. Roosevelt to be Assistant Attorney General, May 20, 1939

United States Assistant Attorney General
- In office May 20, 1939 – December 20, 1940
- Preceded by: Brien McMahon
- Succeeded by: Wendell Berge

Personal details
- Born: Oetje John Rogge; October 12, 1903 Cass County, Illinois, U.S.
- Died: March 22, 1981 (aged 77) New York City, U.S.
- Spouses: Nellie Alma Luther (m. 1926) Wanda Lucille Johnston (m. 1939)
- Children: Genevieve Oetjeanne Meyer and Hermann Rogge
- Education: University of Illinois (BA); Harvard University (LLB)
- Alma mater: University of Illinois; Harvard Law School
- Occupation: Attorney
- Known for: Civil liberties activism
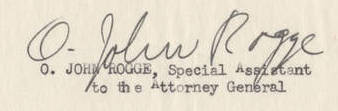
- Signature

Oetje John Rogge (German pronunciation: [ˈiːtʃi dʒɔn ˈɹɔɡə]) (October 12, 1903 – March 22, 1981) was an American attorney who prosecuted cases for the United States government, investigated Nazi activities in the United States, and in private practice was associated with civil rights and liberal political causes. He was the prosecutor in the Great Sedition Trial, in which the U.S. government, under the initiative of President Franklin D. Roosevelt, tried dozens of isolationists and Nazi sympathizers for sedition. Although the trial was called off after the judge died midway through the trial, with it being abandoned entirely after the end of the war in Europe, Rogge was successful in discrediting U.S. politicians who were linked with Nazi propagandist agent George Sylvester Viereck. Many of these politicians would lose their reelection campaigns.

On October 14, 1946, in a New York City speech, he said: "The removal of Hitler and Mussolini and a few of their collaborators does not mean that fascism is dead. Now the fascists can take a more subtle disguise, they can come forward and simply say 'I am anti-Communist.'"

== Early life and education ==
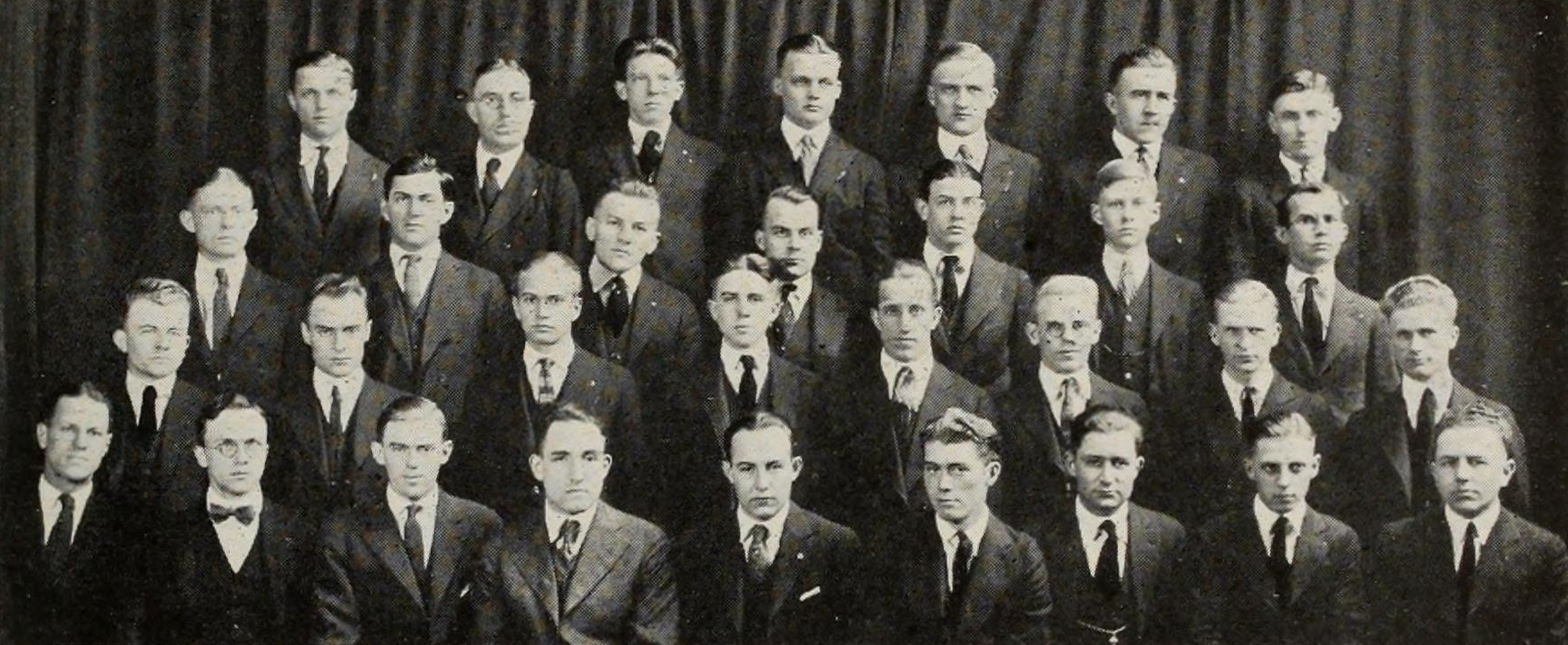
Rogge (top row, center) and other members of the Philomathean Literary Society at the University of Illinois, 1922

Rogge was born on a farm near Springfield, Illinois, on October 12, 1903, to German immigrant parents. He graduated from the University of Illinois in 1922, where he was a member of Phi Beta Kappa, and earned a law degree at Harvard in 1925, where he was on the Law Review. He worked in private practice for several years before returning to Harvard for a year in 1930-1931 and earning his Doctor of Juristic Science degree.

== Government service ==
Rogge entered government service in 1934, working for the Reconstruction Finance Corporation until 1937, where he became special counsel. He held the same title at the Treasury Department and served for two years as assistant general counsel at the Securities and Exchange Commission.

Rogge investigated the alleged graft and fraud practiced by the Huey Long political machine in Louisiana and successfully prosecuted several of its members on charges of mail fraud.

In May 1939, Rogge became assistant attorney general and headed the Justice Department's criminal division. On December 3, 1940, President Roosevelt wrote to Attorney General Robert H. Jackson: "I have been getting a lot of complaints about our friend Rogge–that he is a self-seeker and that he is overbearing." Rogge married Wanda Johnston in Des Moines, Iowa, on December 15, and while on his honeymoon announced plans to leave the Justice Department to become special counsel for the trustees of the Associated Gas and Electric Company, where he was tasked with handling litigation arising from the company's 1933 refinancing.

In 1943, Rogge returned to the Justice Department as a special assistant to the Attorney General and in 1944 served as prosecutor in the federal government's prosecution of 33 isolationist and Nazi sympathizers for sedition. The case ended in a mistrial after the death of the judge on November 30, 1944.

While he was preparing for a new trial, a member of the U.S. prosecution team at the Nuremberg trials told him that in Germany he would find evidence of direct links between the Nazi government and prominent Americans. He left for Europe on April 4 and conducted an investigation that included conversations with 66 people, including Hermann Göring, the former head of the Luftwaffe, the German air force, and Joachim von Ribbentrop, who had been the Nazi's foreign minister. The report that Rogge authored disturbed Attorney General Tom Clark, who determined it would have to remain a secret internal document because of the prominent names it mentioned, including that of Sen. Burton Wheeler, a friend of Clark. Within days of Clark's decision, syndicated columnist Drew Pearson, reported details from Rogge's report. Pearson likely obtained a copy of Rogge's work indirectly from Clark, who could then blame Rogge for making the information public.

Upset at Clark's suppression of his report, Rogge began speaking out publicly to warn of the continuing fascist threat to the United States. On October 14, 1946, in a New York City speech, he said: "The removal of Hitler and Mussolini and a few of their collaborators does not mean that fascism is dead. Now the fascists can take a more subtle disguise, they can come forward and simply say 'I am anti-Communist.'" Speaking to a political science class at Swarthmore College on October 22, Rogge described Nazi efforts to defeat FDR's re-election in 1936, 1940, and 1944. He identified John L. Lewis of the United Mine Workers and William Rhodes Davis, a business executive in the oil industry, as the Nazis' principal targets in the U.S. and detailed the cooperation between those two. He called the Nazi plan to get Lewis to oppose FDR in 1940 "a fantastic scheme".

On October 25, Clark dismissed Rogge from his position at the Justice Department with a letter saying Rogge had "willfully violated the long-standing rules and regulations" of the Justice Department by revealing the contents of internal documents. Clark wrote that Rogge failed to keep a commitment he made to Clark on the morning of the Swarthmore speech when they discussed what had appeared in Pearson's column in which, by Clark's account, Rogge agreed not to discuss his report of Nazi activities. Rogge issued a statement that he had an entirely different understanding of their conversation. He said he intended to continue speaking publicly about the dangers of fascism and criticized recent decisions of the Justice Department: "The country has a crying need for more statesmen and fewer politicians."

He later compared J. Edgar Hoover's revelations of leftist activity with his own public comments about fascist activity, remarking on the double standard:

The Administration's policy seems doubly dangerous when one recalls that J. Edgar Hoover has been completely free to tell about the insidious activities of the Communists. I am glad he is, but I would judge that his speeches were based on official files just as mine were.

He summed up the politics surrounding his dismissal saying: "Wheeler was closer to President Truman than I was."

In 1946, PM published some of Rogge's findings into the inter-relationship during the 1930s and war years of authoritarian beliefs, armed militia groups, antisemitism and collusion between elected U.S. politicians and the German Nazi propaganda mill. Rogge had little success publishing his information elsewhere for many years but eventually his report was published in full in 1961.

Before his dismissal, he recommended the government dismiss the two long-pending sedition cases.

== Later years ==
=== Private practice ===
In October 1947, Rogge started his own firm based in New York City and Paris to focus on corporate law practice and tax work.

He served as defense attorney for some of the defendants charged with contempt of Congress for withholding records of the Joint Anti-Fascist Refugee Committee. In November 1947, he attacked Clark, claiming that he was "leaking to picked newspaper men" reports about the special Federal grand jury investigation of subversive activities then sitting in New York. He called it "the most porous grand jury investigation in Justice Department history." In 1948, on behalf of the committee, he filed suit in federal district court challenging the constitutionality of Truman's Executive Order 9835, which had provided the government with authority for listing the committee on the Attorney General's List of Subversive Organizations.

Rogge lectured at the Cultural and Scientific Conference for World Peace in 1949.

Hired by the Civil Rights Congress, Rogge served as one of three defense attorneys appealing the convictions of the Trenton Six, African Americans convicted by an all-white jury of the murder of an elderly white shopkeeper. In December 1949, after winning them a new trial, he and the other attorneys were banned from participation in their re-trial because, the trial judge explained, "your conduct throughout has been consistently in violation of one or more of some seven canons of professional ethics." Rogge said the judge's action "extends the reign of terror imposed on lawyers who defend the unorthodox and the weak."

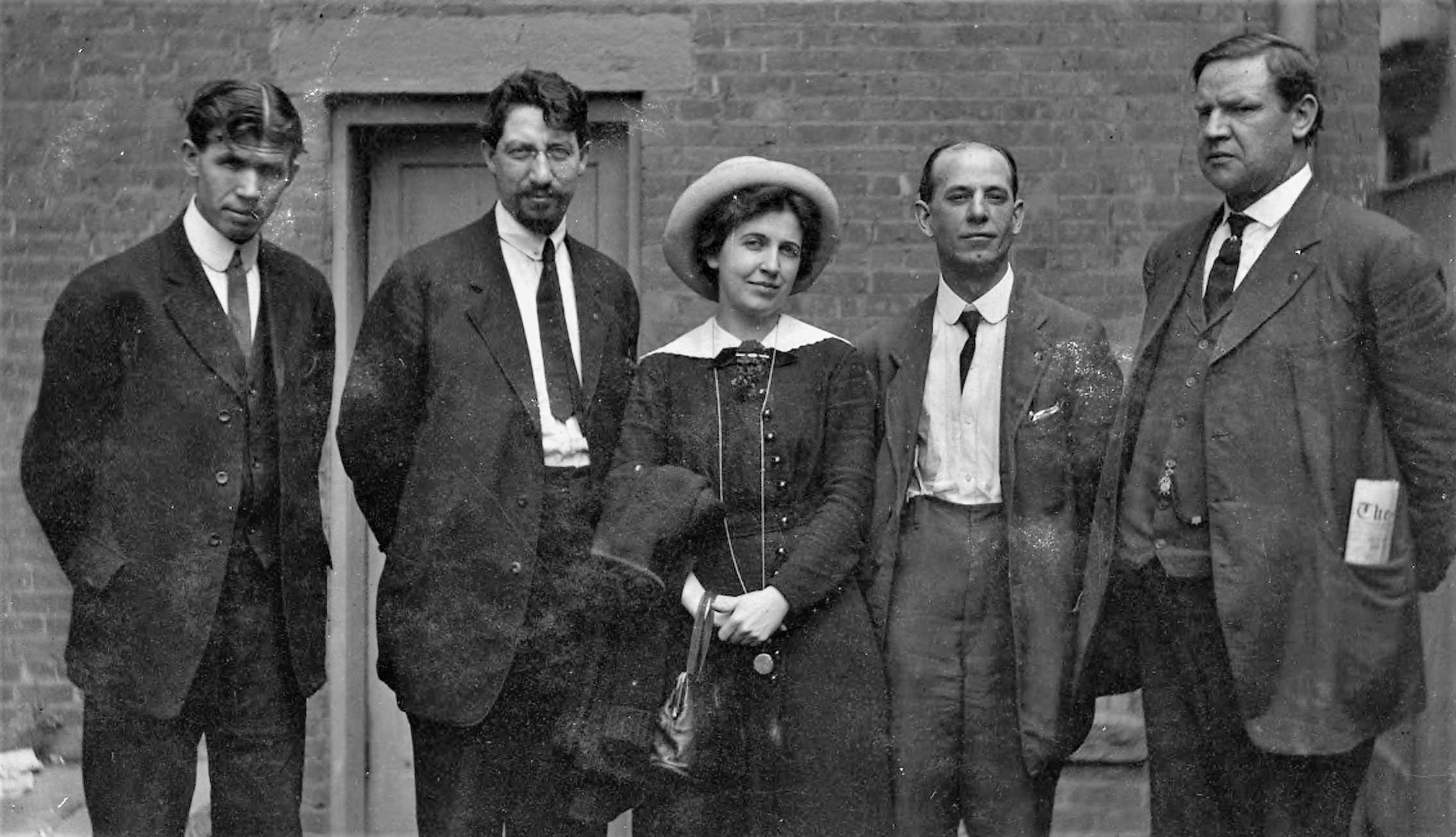
Carol Weiss King's client Elizabeth Gurley Flynn, shown here (center) in 1913 photo with Paterson silk strike leaders Patrick Quinlan and Carlo Tresca (left) and Adolph Lessig and Bill Haywood (right)

In 1951, Rogge joined other lawyers in defending 17 Communist Party members, including Elizabeth Gurley Flynn. The communists were accused of charged conspiring to "teach and advocate violent overthrow" of the government. Original lawyers were: Abraham L. Pomerantz, Carol Weiss King, Victor Rabinowitz, Michael Begun, Harold I. Cammer, Mary Kaufman, Leonard Boudin, and Abraham Unger. Later, a judge replaced them with Rogge, gangster Frank Costello's lawyer George Wolf, William W. Kleinman, Joseph L. Delaney, Frank Serri, Osmond K. Fraenkel, Henry G. Singer, Abraham J. Gellinoff, Raphael P. Koenig, and Nicholas Atlas.

=== Associations ===
Rogge was associated with the ACLU and the National Lawyers Guild.

=== Politics ===
In July 1948, Rogge filed to run for Surrogate of New York County as the candidate of the American Labor Party. He supported Henry A. Wallace when he ran for president as the candidate of the Progressive Party in 1948 and was even suggested as a possible running-mate when Senator Glen H. Taylor of Idaho initially hesitated about running with Wallace. When the party's members fought over accepting the support of Communists, Rogge took the position that the party needed to draw a clear line that established its independence from Communist influence.

In 1951, he left the American Labor Party after two years as a member and registered as a Democrat. He remained a member of the executive committee of the Progressive Party.

=== Congressional hearings ===
On August 13, 1948, Rogge appeared before HUAC as counsel for Frank Coe. He objected to badgering by HUAC chief investigator Robert Stripling.

In 1949, in contentious testimony before the Senate Judiciary Committee, Rogge sharply attacked the nomination of Attorney General Clark to a seat on the Supreme Court. He condemned him for issuing lists of subversive organizations in an attempt to "out-Dies the Dies Committee", for maintaining "blacklists", approving extensive wire-tapping, and promoting "a loyalty witch hunt" and "a cold war against anyone who engaged in independent thinking." He said Clark's appointment represented the "erection of an American type of fascism."

=== Continued legal efforts ===
On October 10, 1949, as part of a delegation from the National Non-Partisan Committee that included Paul Robeson, he visited the Department of Justice asking that the indictments against twelve Communist leaders be quashed.

In 1950, Rogge was a member of the Peace Information Center, a short-lived anti-war organization that provided information on peace initiatives in other countries and promoted the Stockholm Appeal, a call for an absolute ban on nuclear weapons.

=== Rosenberg case ===
In June 1950, David Greenglass, a former employee at the Los Alamos nuclear center, was arrested on charges of passing information about the atomic bomb to Soviet agents. Rogge took over the defense of Greenglass and his wife Ruth, who was also accused, though never indicted. Greenglass confessed his involvement and implicated his sister and brother-in-law, Ethel and Julius Rosenberg, who were convicted of espionage and sentenced to death in 1951. At Greenglass's sentencing hearing, Rogge repeatedly told the court his client deserved "a pat on the back" for his testimony and argued that a light sentence, no more than five years, would encourage others to follow his example. Greenglass received a 15-year prison sentence. Of Rogge's role in arranging for Greenglass to testify against the Rosenbergs, Roy Cohn later wrote: "Without John Rogge there might not have been a successful prosecution. Indeed, it is not too much to say that Mr. Rogge broke the Rosenberg case. Which is the very definition of irony."

=== Final years ===
When local authorities tried to close a Times Square movie theater on the grounds that it had violated a state statute that banned the public display of "nudity, sexual conduct and sado-masochistic activities," Rogge defended the theater owner's choice of films as free expression protected by the First Amendment. He lost the case in 1971.

== Personal life and death ==
On December 15, 1939, Rogge married Wanda Johnston in Des Moines, Iowa.

At the time of his death on March 22, 1981, he lived in Stamford, Connecticut. He died of cancer at Beth Israel Medical Center in New York. His second wife, the former Wanda Lucille Johnston, and two children survived him.

== Works ==
- Our Vanishing Civil Liberties (New York: Gaer Associates, 1949)
- Why Men Confess (New York: Thomas Nelson, 1959)
- "Unenumerated Rights", 47 Cal. L. Rev. 787 (1959)
- The First and the Fifth: with some excursions into others (New York: Thomas Nelson, 1960)
- The Official German report: Nazi penetration 1924-1942, Pan-Arabism 1939-today (New York: Thomas Yoseloff, 1961)
- Obscenity Litigation in 10 American Jurisprudence Trials (1965)
