= American Committee for the Protection of Foreign Born =

Communist front group

American Committee for Protection of Foreign Born
- Predecessor: National Council for the Protection of the Foreign Born
- Merged into: National Emergency Civil Liberties Committee
- Formation: 1933
- Merger of: 1982
- Purpose: Defend rights of foreign born, especially radicals and Communist Party members
- Headquarters: New York City
- Services: Litigation, legislation, public education
- National chairman (1942): Hugh De Lacy
- Executive Secretary (1933-1939): Dwight C. Morgan
- Key people: Carol Weiss King (1942-1952)
- Affiliations: International Labor Defense, International Juridical Association

American Committee for the Protection of Foreign Born was the successor group to the National Council for the Protection of the Foreign Born and its successor, seen by the US federal government as subversive for "protecting foreign Communists who come to this country," thus "enabling them to operate here.".

== History ==
By 1922, groups to defend foreign born communists began to emerge locally, but a National Council for Protection of Foreign Born did not form until May 1926.

In 1933, Roger Nash Baldwin of the American Civil Liberties Union formed the American Committee for Protection of Foreign Born. The committee sought to defend rights of foreign born, especially radicals and Communist Party members, who went otherwise legally undefended. It pursued three avenues: litigation, legislation, and public education.

The US federal government determined that the committee worked closely with the International Labor Defense, legal arm of the Communist Party USA, in turn an arm of the Soviet-formed Communist International and thus supported Party (Soviet) policies.

In the 1930s, the committee campaigned for asylum rights for refugees of European fascism who faced deportation. After the start of the Spanish Civil War in 1936, the committee protected fighters against Francisco Franco who could not (re-)enter the United States legally, e.g., American members of the Abraham Lincoln Brigade.

During World War II, the committee joined the Popular Front in promoting national unity against fascism. It helped Japanese-Americans after internment. It successfully defended CPUSA leader William Schneiderman against cancelation of his naturalization due to communist memberships. It defended Australian-born labor leader Harry Bridges.

During the early Cold War, the US federal government increased its efforts to deport foreign born trade unionists and Communists; it also attacked the committee itself. In June 1948, Attorney General Tom C. Clark added the committee to a Justice Department list of "subversive" organizations. The McCarran Internal Security Act of 1950 and the McCarran-Walter Immigration Act of 1952 targeted foreign born Communist Party members. In 1950, Attorney General Herbert Brownell Jr. asked the Subversive Activities Control Board to make the committee register as a Communist front. In 1951, executive secretary, Abner Green went to imprisoned for six months for refusing to submit names of contributors. In January 1952, Carol Weiss King, general counsel, died.

From 1955 to 1957, the committee faced a charge of violating charitable laws. In 1957, a New York State Supreme Court ex parte injunction stopped the committee from all activities. The committee reformed as a charitable organization. Although also in 1957, the United States Supreme Court reversed deportation of Charles Rowoldt based on membership in the Communist Party, the committee gave up direct legal defense of foreign born to focus on public opinion and legislation, e.g., revision or repeal of the McCarran-Walter Act.

In the 1960s, the committee focused on discrimination against Mexican immigrants and West Indian workers. It campaigned to establish a statute of limitation, to eliminate supervisory parole, and to defend the free speech and association of foreign born. Specific bills targeted included the Rodino Bill and the Field-Knorr Bill, "both of which proposed the establishment of sanctions against employers of 'illegal' aliens." The committee also defended political asylum for Haitians.

On April 26, 1965, the United States Supreme Court in American Committee for Protection of Foreign Born v. Subversive Activities Control Board affirmed an order of the Subversive Activities Control Board requiring that the committee, represented by Joseph Forer, must register as a 'Communist-front' organization.

In 1977, the committee helped win right to public education for children of illegally immigrated parents.

In 1982, the National Emergency Civil Liberties Committee absorbed the committee.

== Organization ==
The US federal government deemed both Communist front organizations that worked closely with the International Labor Defense, the legal arm of the Communist Party USA, in turn, an arm of the Soviet-formed Communist International. Both groups supported Party (Soviet) policies.

The American Committee for Protection of the Foreign Born had ties to the Abraham Lincoln Brigade.

The American Committee for Protection of the Foreign Born had various subcommittees:

- Regional: New York Committee for Protection of Foreign Born, Los Angeles Committee for Protection of the Foreign Born, Bay Cities Committee for Protection of the Foreign Born (Pittsburgh), Clatsop County Committee for Protection of the Foreign Born (Oregon), Midwest Committee for Protection of the Foreign Born, Committee for Protection of Oregon's Foreign Born, Western Pennsylvania Committee for Protection of the Foreign Born, Detroit Committee for Protection of the Foreign Born, East Bay Committee for Protection of the Foreign Born, East Side Committee for Protection of the Foreign Born, etc.
- Ethnic: Albanian Committee for Protection of the Foreign Born (Michigan), American-Polish Committee for Protection of the Foreign Born, American-Yugoslav Committee for Protection of the Foreign Born (Pittsburgh), Bulgarian-American Committee for Protection of the Foreign Born, Czechoslovak Committee for Protection of the Foreign Born, Estonian Committee for Protection of the Foreign Born, Greek-American Committee for Protection of the Foreign Born, Hungarian-American Committee for Protection of the Foreign Born, Italian-American Committee for Protection of the Foreign Born, etc.
- Regional and Ethnic: Chicago-Greek Committee for Protection of the Foreign Born, Chicago-Jewish Committee for Protection of the Foreign Born, New York-Polish Committee for Protection of the Foreign Born, etc.
- People Defended: Charles Doyle Defense Committee, Claudia Jones Defense Committee, Committee for the Defense of Martin Karasek, Harry Bridges Defense Committee, etc.

In 1950, the Internal Security Act listed as a "subversive" "Communist-front" organization.

== People ==
The committee had a small staff. Dwight C. Morgan served as executive secretary from 1933 to 1939. Abner Green succeeded him and served from 1941 to 1959. Carol Weiss King served as general counsel from 1942 to 1952; she also co-founded the International Juridical Association (IJA). Ira Gollobin served as associate counsel from 1936 to 1966 and then general counsel from 1967 to 1982.

=== Leaders ===
National Council for Protection of Foreign Born Workers:

- President: Joseph Dean
- Legal Advisor: Henry T. Hunt
- Secretary-Treasurer: Nina Samorodin
- First Vice President: Max Orlowsky
- Second Vice President: P. Pascal Cosgrove

In 1942, Hugh De Lacy was national chairman. In 1951, Louise Pettibone Smith was elected chair. In 1952, George B. Murphy Jr. served as a co-chair.

=== Members ===
Members or individuals affiliated with the American Committee for Protection of Foreign Born included: Albert Einstein, Bela Lugosi, Rex Stout, Emily Balch, Donald Ogden Stewart, Edward G. Robinson, Maurice Hindus, Max Lerner, Ella Winter, Maxim Kopf, Yasuo Kuniyoshi, Leo Krzycki, Michael Quill, Vito Marcantonio, Canada Lee, Louis B. Boudin, Henrietta Buckmaster, Morris Carnovsky, Aaron Copland, Kyle Crichton, Joseph Curran, Abram Flaxer, Langston Hughes, Fredric March (and Florence Eldridge), Adam Clayton Powell Jr., Paul Robeson, Orson Welles, Max Yergan, Guy Endore, Reid Robinson, Theodore Dreiser, Franz Boas, Sidney Hillman, Rockwell Kent, Walter Rautenstrauch, Harry F. Ward, Thomas Addis, Carol King, George Seldes, Frederick V. Field, Martha Dodd, Muriel Draper, Alexander Meiklejohn, Genevieve Taggard, Art Young, Louis Adamic, Morton Dimondstein, and George Albert Coe

Joseph Freeman (writer) a member, as wel Mady Christians.

== Publications ==
The following publications of the American Committee provide details that appear in the Guide to Subversive Organizations and Publications (And Appendixes):

- The Lamp: Monthly publication of the American Committee for Protection of Foreign Born in New York City
- New York Beacon: Publication of the New York Committee for Protection of Foreign Born

Publications by ACPFB members:

- Deportation Terror: A Weapon to Gag America (1950)
- Deportation Drive vs the Bill of Rights: The McCarran Act and the Foreign Born (1951)

Other publications include:

- The Foreign Born in the United States (1936)
- Unequal Justice

== See also ==
- International Juridical Association
- International Labor Defense

== External sources ==
- Records of the American Committee for Protection of Foreign Born, Tamiment Library and Robert F. Wagner Archives, New York University Special Collections
- University of California's Bancroft Collection: Labadie Collection - American Committee for Protection of Foreign Born papers
- American Committee for Protection of Foreign Born Records (1926-1980s)
- Cornell Law School Legal Information Institute - American Committee for Protection of Foreign Born, Petitioner, v. Subversive Activities Control Board
