= Carol Weiss King =

American lawyer and activist (1895–1952)

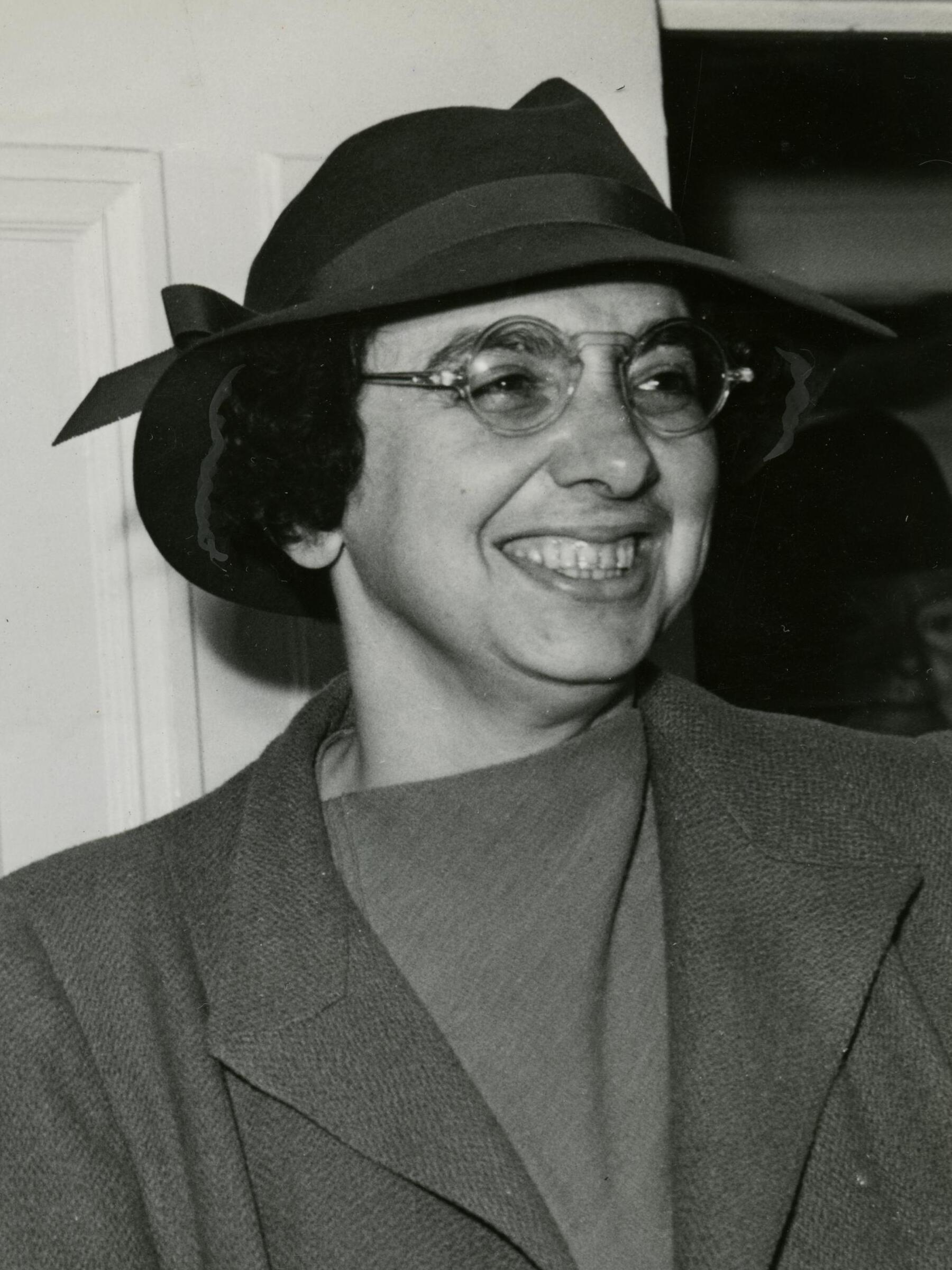
- King in 1939
- Born: Carole Therese Weiss; August 24, 1895; New York City, U.S.
- Died: January 22, 1952 (aged 56); New York City, U.S.
- Other name: Carol King
- Education: Barnard College
- Alma mater: New York University Law School
- Occupations: Attorney, legal organizer
- Years active: 1917–1952
- Known for: Pro-communist, civil rights legal defenses of Harry Bridges, Gerhart Eisler, J. Peters
- Notable work: American Committee for the Protection of Foreign Born, International Labor Defense, International Juridical Association, National Lawyers Guild
- Spouse: Gordon Congdon King
- Children: 1
- Parent(s): Samuel Weiss, Carrie Stix
- Family: William Stix Weiss; Nina Henrietta Weiss Stern, Louis Stix Weiss

Carol Weiss King (24 August 1895 – 22 January 1952) was a well-known immigration lawyer, renowned for her advocacy in defending the civil rights of immigrants, key founder of the International Juridical Association, and a founding member of the National Lawyers Guild in the United States. Her left-leaning career spanned from the Palmer Raids to the McCarthy Era.

== Background ==
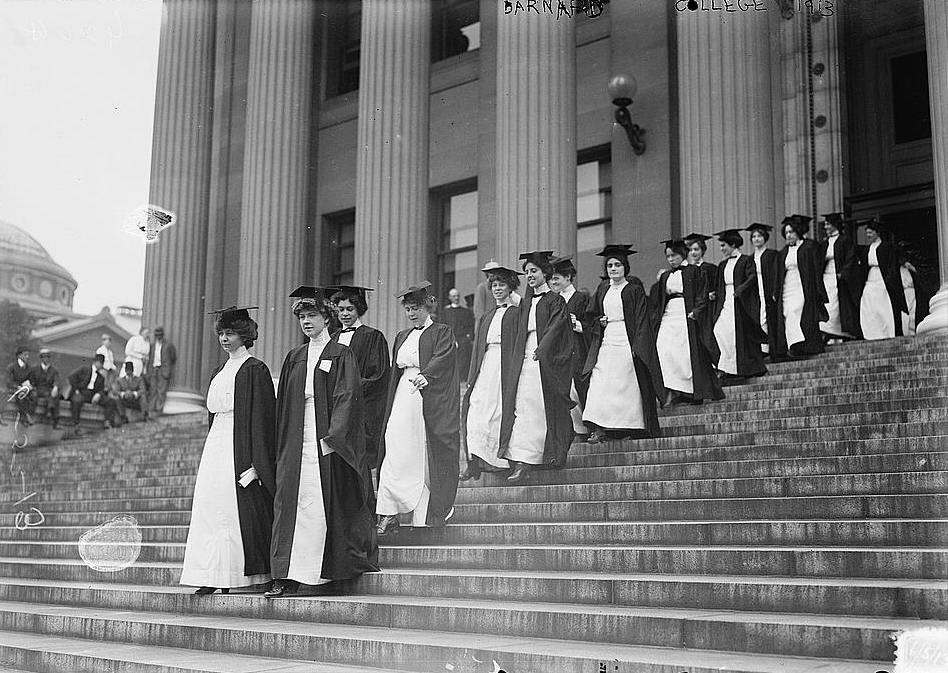
Barnard College class of 1913

Born on August 24, 1895, Carole Therese Weiss was the youngest child of Samuel William Weiss and Carrie Stix. Her father was a founder of the law firm of Frank and Weiss (1875–1880), then practiced alone (1880–1910). Her eldest brother, William S. Weiss, continued their father's firm until forced to stop by multiple sclerosis. Another older brother, Louis S. Weiss, also entered his father's firm, which developed into Paul, Weiss, Rifkind, Wharton & Garrison.

In 1912, Weiss entered Barnard College as a member of the Class of 1916. Archives show many sides of her college life. In 1913, she appeared in a school play, partook in "Mysteries" (sorority rushing), and played basketball. In 1914, she was known as "man-hating" yet managed to appear "resplendent" for the Sophomore Dance. She also joined the managing board of the Barnard Bulletin, whereafter her name appeared as an associate editor. In 1914–15, she was active in the English Club. In 1915, she was involved in the Social Science League, which discussed theories of Scott Nearing and for which she was running as secretary-treasurer. For the Athletic Club, she served as pitcher in 1914.

In 1916, she was among many who had not paid her Athletic Association dues but was in good enough standing to appear listed as a member in the yearbook as well as a committee member for Greek Games. She graduated in 1916. In 1917, Weiss entered law school and in 1920 graduated with a J.D. degree from New York University; her brother Louis graduated with a BA in law from Columbia University, although he started law school a year earlier.

After graduating from law school in 1920 and being admitted to the bar, Weiss commenced her practice at the firm of Hale, Nelles, and Schorr. King became known for her dedication to defending civil rights, particularly in cases involving victims of antiradical hysteria. She gained recognition for her expertise in immigration law, contributing significantly to the field. Throughout her career, she emphasized research and legal brief writing.

== Career ==
By the end of 1916, Weiss was "doing volunteer work for the American Association for Labor Legislation." In 1917, she was a volunteer research assistant for the American Civil Liberties Union (ACLU).

By 1920, as Carol Weiss King, she volunteered to work with Local 25 of the International Ladies Garment Workers Union (ILGWU). In 1921, she had opened her own law office. In 1923, her name appears in the Barnard Bulletin as "lawyer" without affiliation stated.

In 1924, the communist Daily Worker newspaper listed her as one of their most successful solicitors of subscriptions. That same year, she had formed a "loose partnership" with radical attorneys. These included Joseph R. Brodsky, Swinburne Hale, Walter Nelles, Isaac Shorr, and Walter Pollak. One of Carol Weiss King's first and most durable relationships was with Pollak, a onetime partner of Benjamin Cardozo, whom she met through her brother-in-law Carl Stern. King, Pollak and Stern worked on the Scottsboro Boys cases, which Pollak successfully argued in the U.S. Supreme Court, among other cases. (Another source cites her as head partner of "Shorr, Brodsky, and King in 1925.) King also associated with left-wing activists, including members of the Communist Party of the United States of America.

In 1924, she began to edit the Law and Freedom Bulletin an ACLU digest that recorded state and federal cases involving significant questions of constitutional law.

In her 30-year career, she represented hundreds of foreign-born radicals threatened with deportation in administrative proceedings in the lower courts and in the Supreme Court. In 1942, she became general counsel to the American Committee for the Protection of Foreign Born (ACPFB). Due to her association with controversial clients, King herself was subject to surveillance by the FBI.

== ILD, IJA, ACPFB, NLG ==
In 1925, she helped Brodsky found the International Labor Defense for the CPUSA (then operating under the name Workers Party of America) and served on its legal advisory committee. In 1931, she became the primary founder of the International Juridical Association.

In 1937, she helped found the National Lawyers Guild.

In 1942, she became general counsel for the American Committee for the Protection of Foreign Born, until her death in 1952

In a footnote in his 1952 memoir, Whittaker Chambers notes:

In the early 1930s, Hiss had been a member of the International Juridical Association, of which the late Carol [Weiss] King, a habitual attorney for Communists in trouble, was a moving spirit. The International Juridical Association has been cited as subversive by the Attorney General. Also among its members: Lee Pressman, Abraham Isserman (one of the attorneys for the eleven convicted Communist leaders), Max Loewenthal (Max Lowenthal), author of a recent book attacking the F.B.I.

== Cases ==
King supported several United States Supreme Court cases including Powell v. Alabama (1932) (the first Scottsboro Boys case) and Herndon v. Lowrey (1937).

=== Harry Bridges 1938 ===
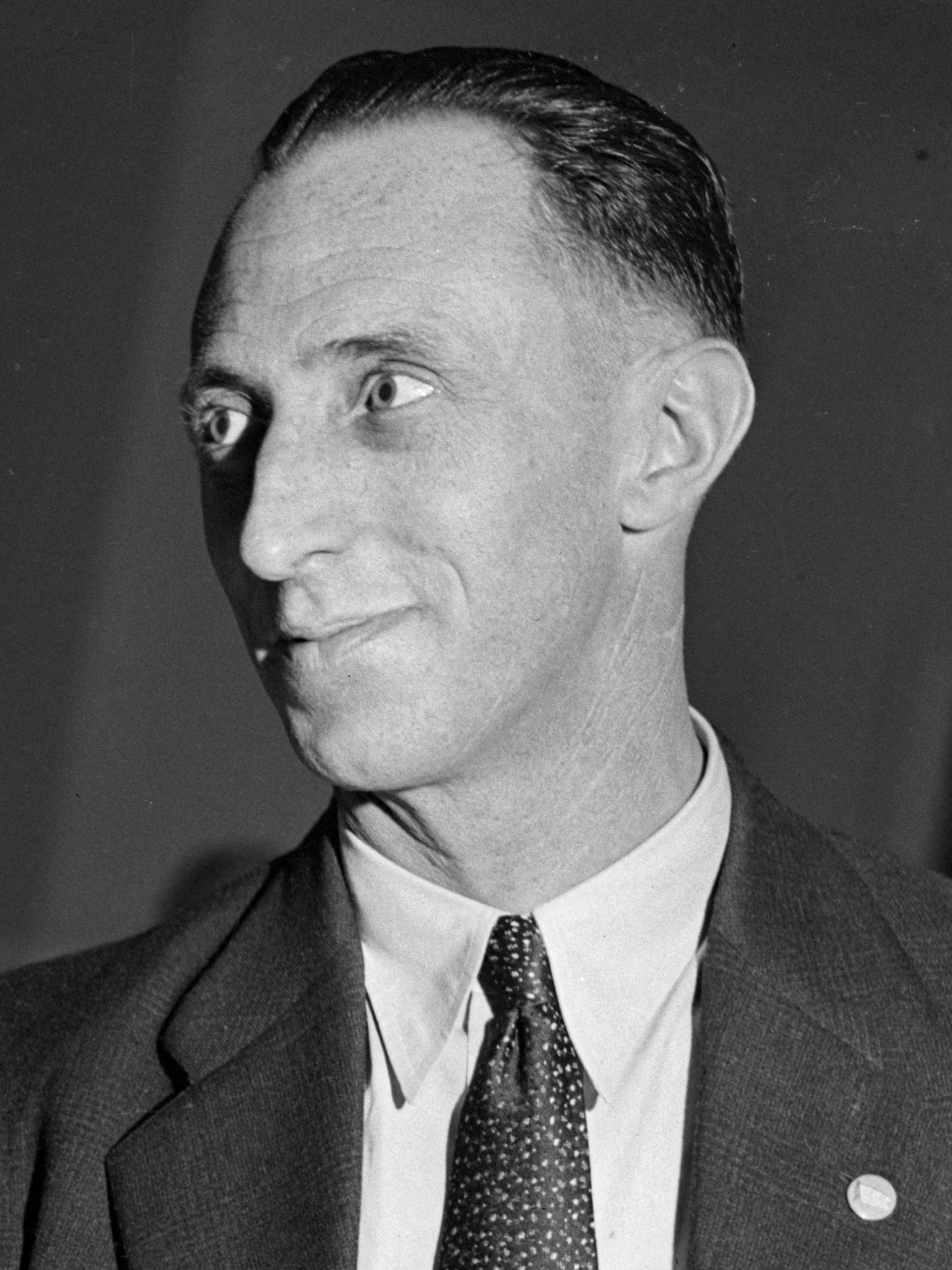
Harry Bridges (1935), whom King defended

King's best-known client was union leader Harry Bridges, who faced deportation in 1938 for alleged membership in the Communist Party. The case reached the Supreme Court of the United States, which reversed the deportation order during World War II.

=== William Schneiderman 1940 ===
King's representation of Communist Party leader William Schneiderman exemplifies her success in enlisting other (male) attorneys to work for free on key constitutional cases — in this case, recruiting Wendell Willkie, the 1940 Republican Party presidential nominee, to represent Schneiderman before the Supreme Court. King won this case in 1943, preventing the Government's revocation of the Communist Party leader's citizenship.

=== Gerhart Eisler 1947 ===
King also represented Gerhart Eisler in his trial in July 1947. She accused FBI agent, Robert J. Lamphere, of framing Eisler. After only a few hours of deliberation, the jury brought in a guilty verdict and he was sentenced to a year in prison. Lamphere asked Eisler as the court was adjourning, "Gerhart, do you think you got a fair trial?" He replied: "Yes, a fair trial but an unfair indictment." Lamphere later recalled: "It was the last time I saw Eisler in person; in a way, I almost liked him - his bravado was astonishing."

=== J. Peters 1948 ===
King also defended "red conspirator" J. Peters against the INS (named by Louis Budenz and Whittaker Chambers as mastermind of a Soviet underground spy ring operating in Washington, DC, during the 1930s and 1940s) and counseled Peters on how to testify before the House Un-American Activities Committee (HUAC) (1948–1949).

Although the J. Peters case was among the best known of King's career, Ann Fagan Ginger makes only a single reference to it in her biography of more than 500 pages.

=== Sung v. McGrath 1950 ===
King took on many cases against the Immigration and Naturalization Service (INS). Her most important legal victory came from Sung v. McGrath (339 U.S. 908, 1950). In this case, the Supreme Court acknowledged that INS was subject to the same administrative and procedural rules as all other federal departments. This ruling froze deportation hearings until the INS agreed to comply with the requirements of the Administrative Procedure Act.

=== Later ===
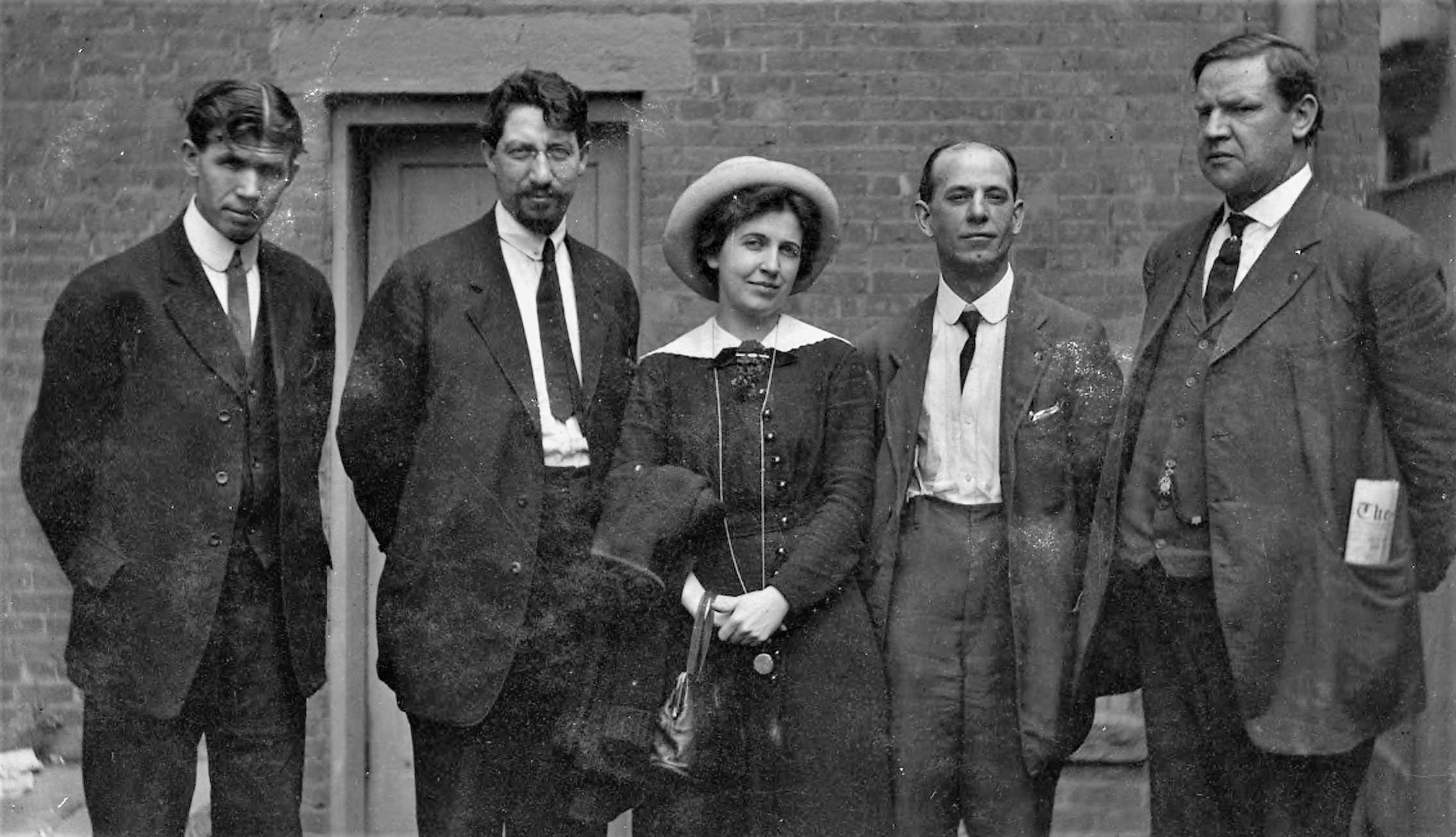
Carol Weiss King's client Elizabeth Gurley Flynn, shown here (center) in 1913 photo with Paterson silk strike leaders Patrick Quinlan and Carlo Tresca left and Adolph Lessig and Bill Haywood right

In 1951, King joined more than half a dozen other lawyers in defending 17 Communist Party members, including Elizabeth Gurley Flynn. The communists were accused of charged conspiring to "teach and advocate violent overthrow" of the government. The other lawyers were: Abraham L. Pomerantz, Victor Rabinowitz, Michael Begun, Harold I. Cammer, Mary Kaufman, Leonard Boudin, and Abraham Unger. Later, they were relieved by O. John Rogge, gangster Frank Costello's lawyer George Wolf, William W. Kleinman, Joseph L. Delaney, Frank Serri, Osmond K. Fraenkel, Henry G. Singer, Abraham J. Gellinoff, Raphael P. Koenig, and Nicholas Atlas.

King herself made only one appearance before the Supreme Court, in Butterfield v. Zydok (342 U.S. 524, 1952), which she lost.

African-American Communist organizer Angelo Herndon was another client.

She also represented petitioner Harisiades in the important U.S. Supreme Court immigration law case Harisiades v. Shaughnessy, 342 U.S. 580, 1952.

== Personal life and death ==
She married Gordon Congdon King in 1917. Her husband died of pneumonia in 1930, leaving her a widow with one son—and her work. (Her brother William married 1915 Barnard alumna, Ray Levi.)

The Federal Bureau of Investigation (FBI) kept King under surveillance due to her close communist associations.

On January 22, 1952, Carol Weiss King age 56 died of cancer.

== Legacy ==
Barnard College recognized Carol Weiss King in a 1951 issue of the Barnard Bulletin:

Carol Weiss King '16, is a prominent lawyer specializing in immigration work. She has served as counsel in several well-known cases, including the Harry Bridges case, for which she was chief counsel up through the U.S. Supreme Court; and the William Schneiderman case, in which she was co-counsel with Wendell Willkie. Mrs. King has also published numerous articles for law reviews.

Other alumnae who appeared in that article include poet Leonie Adams Troy ('22), author Irma Simonton Black ('27), and Margaret Mead ('23).

The National Lawyers Guild's Immigration Project presents the Carol King award each year in Ms. King's honor to an outstanding immigration advocate.

Walter Pollak's son, Senior U.S. District Judge Louis Pollak (who married King's niece), wrote the foreword to Ann Fagan Ginger's 1993 biography of Carol Weiss King.

== Works ==
- "The Sacco-Vanzetti Case is not Dead," New Masses (1933)

== External sources ==
- Ginger, Ann Fagan (1993). Carol Weiss King, human rights lawyer, 1895-1952. Boulder: University Press of Colorado. ISBN 0-87081-285-8. LCCN 92040157.
- "Carol Weiss King". Jewish Women: A Comprehensive Historical Encyclopedia.
- Thompson, Craig (17 February 1951). "The Communists's Dearest Friend". Saturday Evening Post. pp. 30, 90–93.
