= Michael Boudin =

American federal judge (1939–2025)

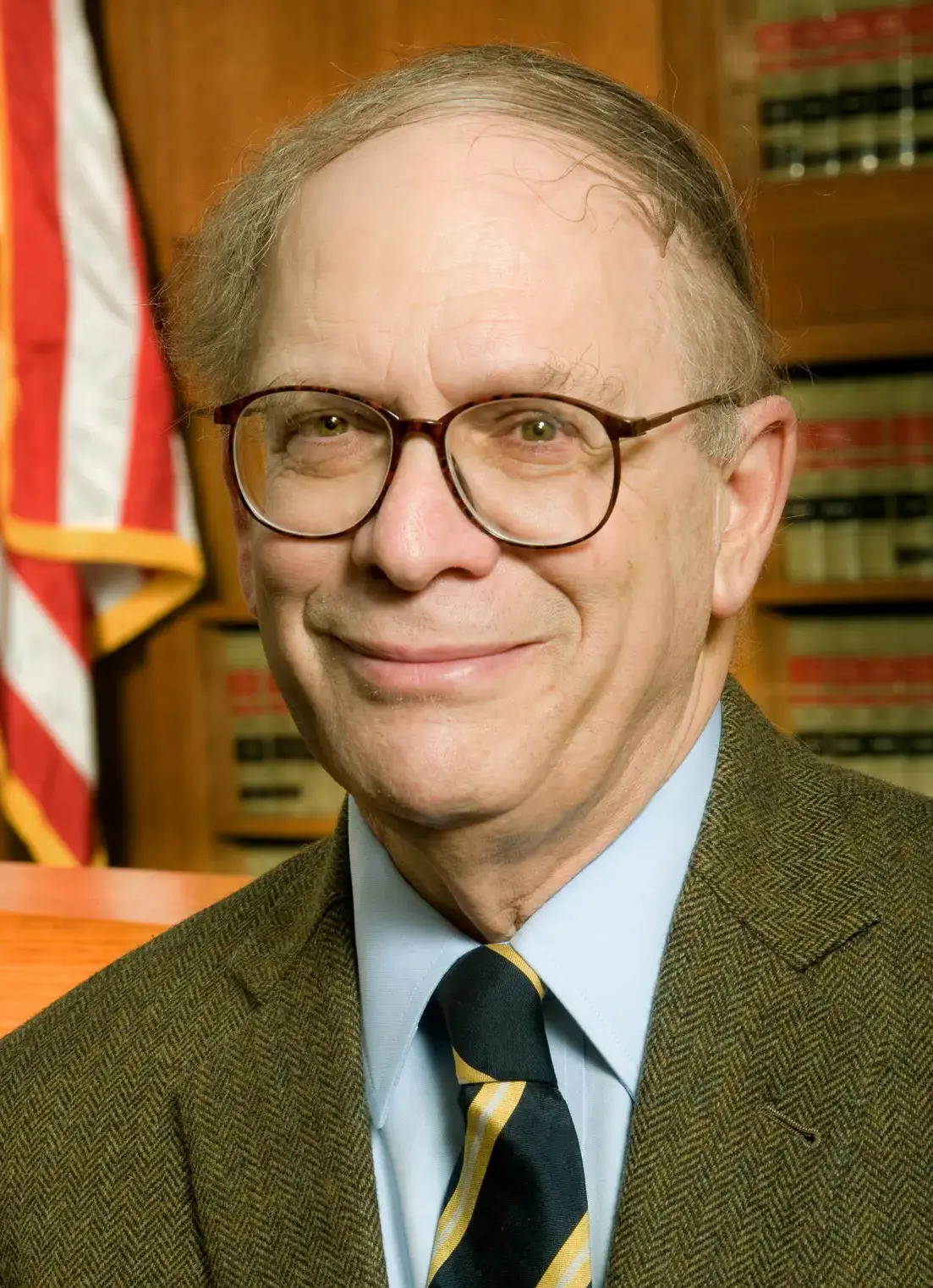
- Boudin in 2011

Senior Judge of the United States Court of Appeals for the First Circuit
- In office June 1, 2013 – December 15, 2021

Chief Judge of the United States Court of Appeals for the First Circuit
- In office June 15, 2001 – June 16, 2008
- Preceded by: Juan R. Torruella
- Succeeded by: Sandra Lynch

Judge of the United States Court of Appeals for the First Circuit
- In office May 26, 1992 – June 1, 2013
- Appointed by: George H. W. Bush
- Preceded by: Levin H. Campbell
- Succeeded by: David J. Barron

Judge of the United States District Court for the District of Columbia
- In office August 7, 1990 – January 31, 1992
- Appointed by: George H. W. Bush
- Preceded by: John H. Pratt
- Succeeded by: Gladys Kessler

Personal details
- Born: November 29, 1939 New York City, U.S.
- Died: March 24, 2025 (aged 85) Boston, Massachusetts, U.S.
- Spouse: Martha Field (separated)
- Children: 3
- Parent: Leonard Boudin (father)
- Relatives: Louis B. Boudin (grand-uncle); I. F. Stone (uncle); Kathy Boudin (sister); Chesa Boudin (nephew)
- Education: Harvard University (BA, LLB)

Michael Boudin (/buːˈdiːn/ boo-DEEN; November 29, 1939 – March 24, 2025) was an American lawyer and jurist who served as a United States circuit judge of the U.S. Court of Appeals for the First Circuit from 1992 to 2021. He served as Chief Judge of that court from 2001 to 2008. Prior to his service on the First Circuit, he was a United States District Judge of the United States District Court for the District of Columbia.

== Early life and education ==
Boudin was born in Manhattan, New York on November 29, 1939 into a Jewish family. He was the son of poet Jean (Roisman) Boudin and civil liberties attorney Leonard Boudin and the older brother of Weather Underground member Kathy Boudin. Michael Boudin was educated at Elizabeth Irwin High School before going on to Harvard University, where he graduated in 1961 with a Bachelor of Arts in government. He then attended Harvard Law School, where became the president of the Harvard Law Review. He graduated first in his class with a Bachelor of Laws in 1964.

Boudin was a law clerk for Judge Henry J. Friendly of the United States Court of Appeals for the Second Circuit from 1964 to 1965, and is noted as being "like a son to the judge"; he was later instrumental in the endowment of the Henry J. Friendly Medal, awarded by the American Law Institute. He subsequently clerked for Justice John Marshall Harlan II of the Supreme Court of the United States from 1965 to 1966.

== Legal career ==
From 1966 to 1987, Boudin practiced law at Covington & Burling, a Washington, D.C., law firm. He worked as a visiting professor at Harvard Law School from 1982 to 1983, and then as a lecturer there from 1983 to 1998. He then served in President Reagan's Justice Department as a deputy assistant United States Attorney General of the Antitrust Division from 1987 to 1990.

== Federal judicial service ==
On May 18, 1990, President George H. W. Bush nominated Boudin to the United States District Court for the District of Columbia, to a seat vacated by John H. Pratt. He was confirmed by the United States Senate on August 3, 1990, and received his commission on August 7, 1990. Boudin served on the District Court for about 18 months, but resigned on January 31, 1992, to return to Massachusetts.

Two months later, on March 20, 1992, President Bush nominated Boudin to an appellate judgeship on the United States Court of Appeals for the First Circuit, headquartered in Boston, to the seat vacated when Judge Levin H. Campbell assumed senior status. He was confirmed by the Senate on May 21, 1992, and received his commission on May 26, 1992. Boudin served as Chief Judge of the First Circuit from 2001 to 2008. He assumed senior status on June 1, 2013. He retired from service on December 15, 2021.

The New York Times stated that Boudin was "not easy to pigeonhole ideologically". He was described by some as a conservative and by others as a centrist. In 2012, Boudin penned a decision holding the Defense of Marriage Act, a federal law defining marriage as an opposite-sex union, unconstitutional. Boudin was widely regarded as having a brilliant legal mind.

== Personal life and death ==
Boudin was married to Harvard Law professor Martha Field. They separated in later years but did not divorce. He was elected to the American Philosophical Society in 2010. His nephew, Chesa Boudin, is an attorney who has served as district attorney of San Francisco.

Boudin died from complications of dementia and Parkinson's disease at a care facility in Boston on March 24, 2025, at the age of 85.

== See also ==
- List of Jewish American jurists
- List of law clerks for the ninth seat of the Supreme Court of the United States
- Louis B. Boudin
- Leonard Boudin
- Kathy Boudin
- Chesa Boudin

Legal offices
Preceded by John H. Pratt	Judge of the United States District Court for the District of Columbia; 1990–1992	Succeeded by Gladys Kessler
Preceded by Levin H. Campbell	Judge of the United States Court of Appeals for the First Circuit; 1992–2013	Succeeded by David J. Barron
Preceded by Juan R. Torruella	Chief Judge of the United States Court of Appeals for the First Circuit; 2001–2008	Succeeded by Sandra Lynch
