= American Communications Association =

The American Communications Association (ACA) was a telegraph and radio workers union, founded in 1931.

== History ==
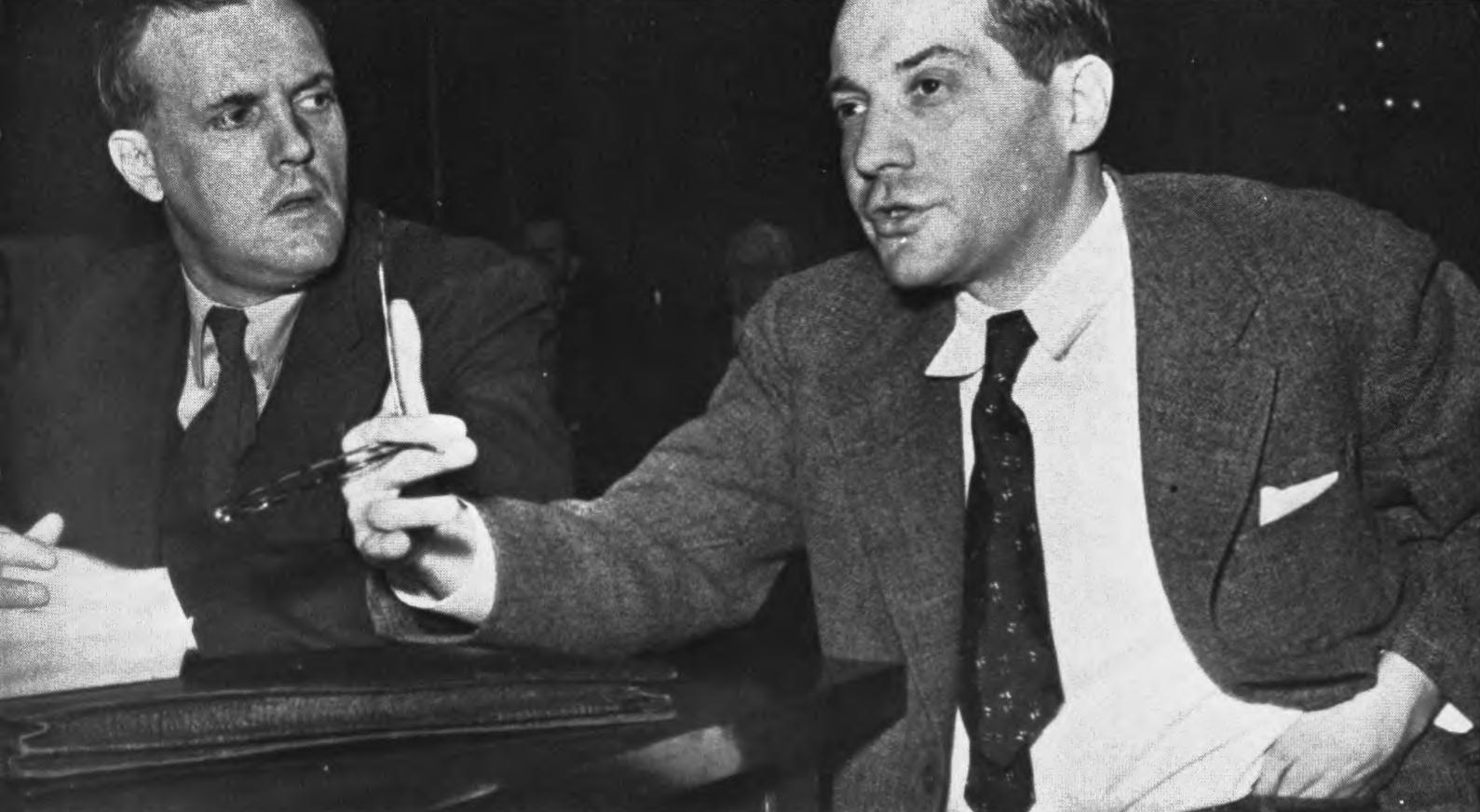
ACA president Mervyn Rathbone (left) is defended by Congressman Vito Marcantonio before the Dies Committee

In 1931, ACA was founded as the American Radio Telegraphists Association (ARTA) by Mervyn Rathbone. The union represented telegraphists and radio operators (on land and at sea) in the United States. The union had previously been involved in a Supreme Court case regarding the use of strikebreakers in strikes (NLRB v. Mackay Radio & Telegraph Co., 304 U.S. 333 (1938)), which it had lost.

In 1937, the union changed its name to the American Communications Association and affiliated with the newly formed Congress of Industrial Organizations. A majority of the union's members were strongly left-wing, and most of the union's leaders were members of the Communist Party USA (CPUSA)—with the union effectively under the control of the CPUSA.

In May-June 1951, the United States Senate Subcommittee on Internal Security (SSIS) held hearings on "Subversive Infiltration in the Telegraph Industry." Appearing under subpoena were the union's lawyer Victor Rabinowitz, ACA president Joseph Selly, ACA secretary-treasurer Joseph Kehoe, executive board member Louis Siebenberg, ACA vice president Dominick Rocco Panza, ACA recording secretary Mollie Townsend, ACA Local 40 chairman John Wieners, ACA Local 40 secretary-treasurer Alfred Doumar, and ACA publicity director Charles Silberman. Hostile witnesses against ACA was nineteen-year-old Herbert Romerstein and retired Western Union employee and ex-ACA member Ann Graham Davis appeared, who claimed to have left ACA when forced to join the CPUSA.
