= Kathy Boudin =

American radical activist (1943–2022)

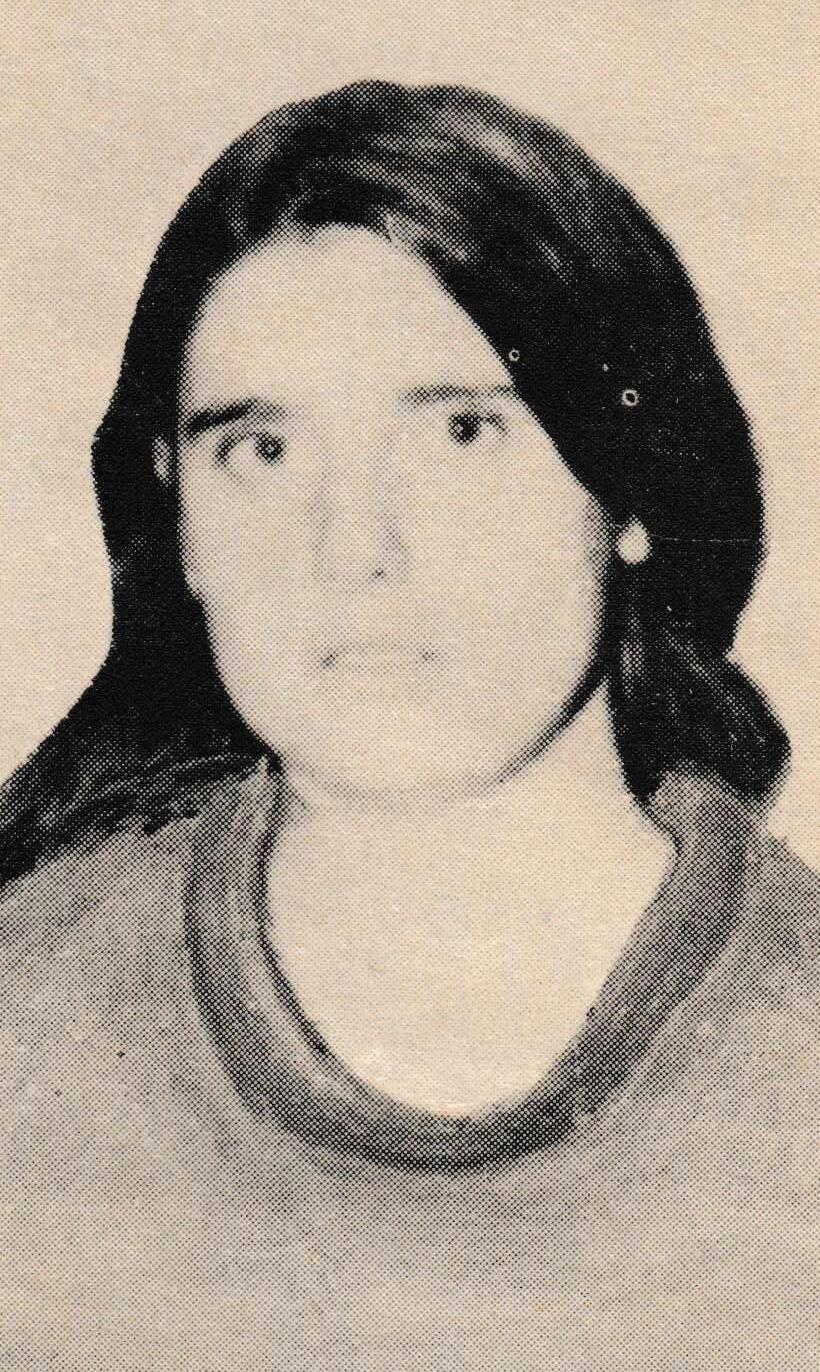
- Born: May 19, 1943; New York City, U.S.
- Died: May 1, 2022 (aged 78); New York City, U.S.
- Education: Bryn Mawr College (BA); Vermont College (MA); Columbia University (EdD)
- Organization: Weather Underground
- Spouse: David Gilbert
- Children: Chesa Boudin
- Relatives: Leonard Boudin (father); Michael Boudin (brother); Louis B. Boudin (great-uncle); I.F. Stone (uncle)
- Status: Paroled after 23 years
- Convictions: Second degree murder First degree robbery
- Penalty: 20 years to life in prison

Kathy Boudin (May 19, 1943 – May 1, 2022) was an American radical leftist who served 23 years in prison for felony murder for her role in the 1981 Brink's robbery.

Boudin was a founding member of the Weather Underground organization, which engaged in bombings of government buildings to express opposition to U.S. foreign policy and racism. The Brink's robbery, in which Boudin acted as a decoy, resulted in the killing of two Nyack, New York police officers and one security guard along with serious injury to another security guard. Boudin was arrested attempting to flee the scene after the getaway vehicle was stopped by police. She pleaded guilty to felony murder and robbery in 1984 in exchange for an agreed-upon sentence of 20 years to life in prison; in 2003, she was released from prison on parole.

Boudin earned an EdD from Columbia University Teachers College in 2007. She later became an adjunct professor at Columbia University School of Social Work, where she served as the co-founder and co-director of the Center for Justice.

== Early life, family, and education ==
Kathy Boudin was born in Manhattan on May 19, 1943 into a Jewish family with a storied left-wing history. Boudin was raised in Greenwich Village, New York City. Her paternal grandparents had emigrated from Russia and Austria. Her great-uncle was Marxist theorist Louis B. Boudin. Her mother was poet Jean (Roisman) Boudin, whose sister Esther was married to radical journalist I.F. Stone (making him Kathy's uncle). Her father, attorney Leonard Boudin, had represented clients such as Judith Coplon, the Cuban government, and Paul Robeson. A National Lawyers Guild attorney, Leonard Boudin was the law partner of Victor Rabinowitz, himself counsel to many left-wing organizations. Her brother, Michael Boudin, became a lawyer and served as a judge on the United States Court of Appeals for the First Circuit.

Kathy Boudin graduated from Bryn Mawr College in 1965 "with distinction". After college, she attended the Case Western Reserve University School of Law for less than a year.

Boudin met her romantic partner, David Gilbert, in the 1970s. She gave birth to their son, Chesa Boudin, in 1980. When her son was 14 months old, she was arrested. She later pleaded guilty to felony murder and was incarcerated. David Gilbert was convicted and incarcerated for his role in the same crime. Thereafter, Chesa Boudin was raised by former Weatherman leaders Bill Ayers and Bernardine Dohrn.

== Weather Underground ==
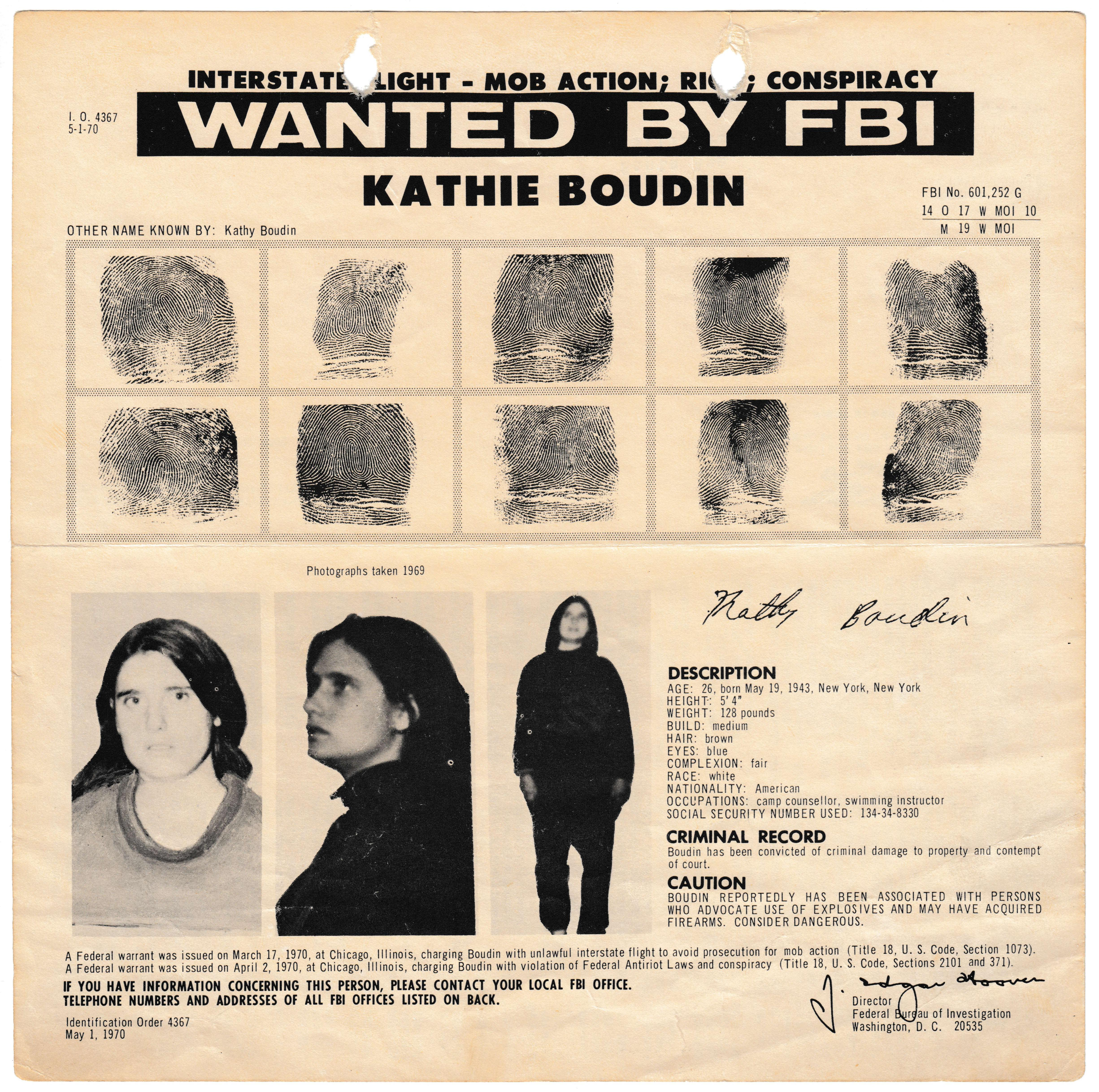
Kathy Boudin FBI wanted poster issued May 1, 1970 with first name misspelled

A radical leftist, Boudin became a founding member of the Weatherman faction of Students for a Democratic Society in 1969. In 1970, this faction became known as the Weather Underground Organization (WUO). Also in 1970, Boudin and Cathy Wilkerson were the only survivors of the Greenwich Village townhouse explosion; a bomb that their comrades were constructing in anticipation of an attack on U.S. Army personnel that evening exploded prematurely, killing three militants and demolishing the building that they were using as a hideout and bomb factory. Boudin emerged from the wreckage naked and then disappeared.

In 1981, Boudin and several former members of the Weather Underground, along with current members of the May 19th Communist Organization and the Black Liberation Army, robbed a Brink's armored car at the Nanuet Mall in Nanuet, New York. Boudin was in the front seat of a U-Haul truck used as a switchcar getaway vehicle and also acted as a decoy. Responding police testified that when they spotted and pulled her over, Boudin feigned innocence and encouraged the two responding officers to put their guns down, whereupon her accomplices leaped from the back of the truck with automatic weapons and shot officers Edward O'Grady and Waverly Brown, killing them both. In addition to killing O'Grady and Brown, the robbers had already seriously wounded guard Joseph Trombino, killed his partner Peter Paige, and injured two other police officers.

=== Guilty plea and incarceration ===
Boudin was arrested attempting to flee after the getaway vehicle she occupied was stopped by police. As part of a negotiated plea agreement to avoid three potential murder convictions that could have resulted in Boudin serving three consecutive 25-years-to-life sentences, she pleaded guilty to felony murder and robbery in 1984 in exchange for an agreed-upon sentence of 20 years to life in prison.

While incarcerated, Boudin published articles in the Harvard Educational Review ("Participatory Literacy Education Behind Bars: AIDS Opens the Door," Summer 1993, 63 (2)) and in Breaking the Rules: Women in Prison and Feminist Therapy by Judy Harden and Marcia Hill ("Lessons from a Mother's Program in Prison: A Psychosocial Approach Supports Women and Their Children," published simultaneously in Women & Therapy, 21), Boudin also co-founded AIDS Committee for Education (ACE) inside the prison in 1988 with other incarcerated women including Katrina Haslip and Judith Alice Clark to provide accurate education on living with HIV. During this time, she earned a master's in adult education from Vermont College, then the women's college of Norwich University.

Boudin also wrote and published poetry while incarcerated, publishing in books and journals including the PEN Center Prize Anthology Doing Time, Concrete Garden, and Aliens at the Border. She won an International PEN prize for her poetry in 1999.

Boudin and Roslyn D. Smith contributed the piece "Alive Behind the Labels: Women in Prison" to the 2003 anthology Sisterhood Is Forever: The Women's Anthology for a New Millennium, edited by Robin Morgan.

After almost 23 years' imprisonment, Boudin was granted parole on August 20, 2003, in her third parole hearing. She was released from the Bedford Hills Correctional Facility on September 18, 2003.

== Life after prison ==
After her release from prison, Boudin accepted a job in the HIV/AIDS Clinic at St. Luke's-Roosevelt Hospital Center, meeting the work provisions of parole that required active job prospects. Later, she founded the Coming Home Program at the Spencer Cox Center for Health at Mt. Sinai/St.Luke's Hospital in Morningside Heights, which provides health care for people returning from incarceration.

In May 2004 Boudin published an essay in the Fellowship of Reconciliation's publication Fellowship. In it, she expressed remorse for her participation in the Brink's robbery, which she described as "horrific." She received an EdD from Columbia University Teachers College in 2007.

=== Columbia University ===
Boudin was named an adjunct professor at the Columbia University School of Social Work, where she was the co-director and co-founder of the Center for Justice at Columbia University. Her appointment was controversial due to her guilty plea to a felony murder charge and her past participation in a group which carried out terrorist attacks in the United States. However, an opinion piece in the Columbia Daily Spectator stated that she took responsibility for her crimes and successfully rehabilitated herself. Columbia School of Social Work Associate Dean Marianne Yoshioka, who hired Boudin for the adjunct-professor post in 2008, stated Boudin had been "an excellent teacher who gets incredible evaluations from her students each year." In 2013, she was Sheinberg Scholar-in-Residence at New York University School of Law. The law school has maintained a video of her Sheinberg lecture.

=== In popular culture ===
Boudin was a model for the title role in David Mamet's play The Anarchist (2012). She also was a model for Willy Holtzman's Off-Broadway play Something You Did (2008). Boudin was an inspiration for the character Merry in Philip Roth's American Pastoral.

== Death ==
On May 1, 2022, Boudin died in New York City at the age of 78. According to her son, Chesa Boudin, Boudin had been battling cancer for seven years.
