= Louis B. Boudin =

American politician (1874–1952)

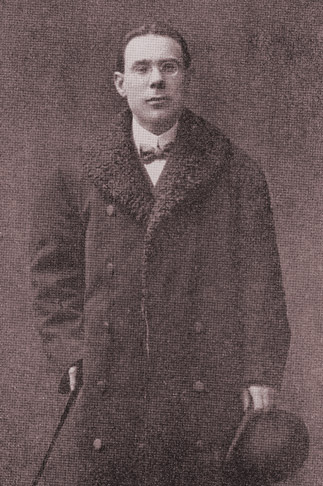
Louis B. Boudin, in a photo taken at the time of his publication of his first book in 1907

Louis B. Boudin (December 15, 1874 – May 29, 1952) was a Russian-born American Marxist theoretician, writer, politician, and lawyer. He is best remembered as the author of a two volume history of the Supreme Court's influence on American government, first published in 1932.

== Early life ==
He was born Louis Boudianoff in Korsun-Shevchenkivskyi, Kiev Governorate, Russian Empire (now Cherkassy Oblast, Ukraine), on February 15, 1874. He was born into a middle-class Jewish family, the son of a shirt manufacturer.

The family emigrated to America in June 1891 and settled in New York City. Louis worked in the garment industry as a shirtmaker and as a private tutor. At the same time, Boudin began legal studies, gaining a Master's Degree from New York University and being admitted to the New York State Bar Association in 1898.

== Political career ==
At first, Boudin was a member of the Socialist Labor Party of America. He was also a member of the governing National Executive Board of the party's trade union affiliate, the Socialist Trade and Labor Alliance from 1898 to 1899. Boudin left the Socialist Labor Party during the party fight of 1899, casting his lot with the dissident faction headed by Morris Hillquit and Henry Slobodin. This dissident organization eventually became one of the main pillars of the new Socialist Party of America, established in the summer of 1901.

Boudin was elected a delegate of the Socialist Party of America to the International Socialist Congress in Stuttgart in 1907 and the 1910 Copenhagen Congress of the Second International.

Boudin was frequently a candidate for public office on the Socialist Party ticket. He ran for Judge of the New York Court of Appeals in 1910, 1914 and 1917, and for Chief Judge in 1916. He also ran for Justice of the New York Supreme Court (2nd District) in 1910, 1912, and 1919.

== Writing career ==
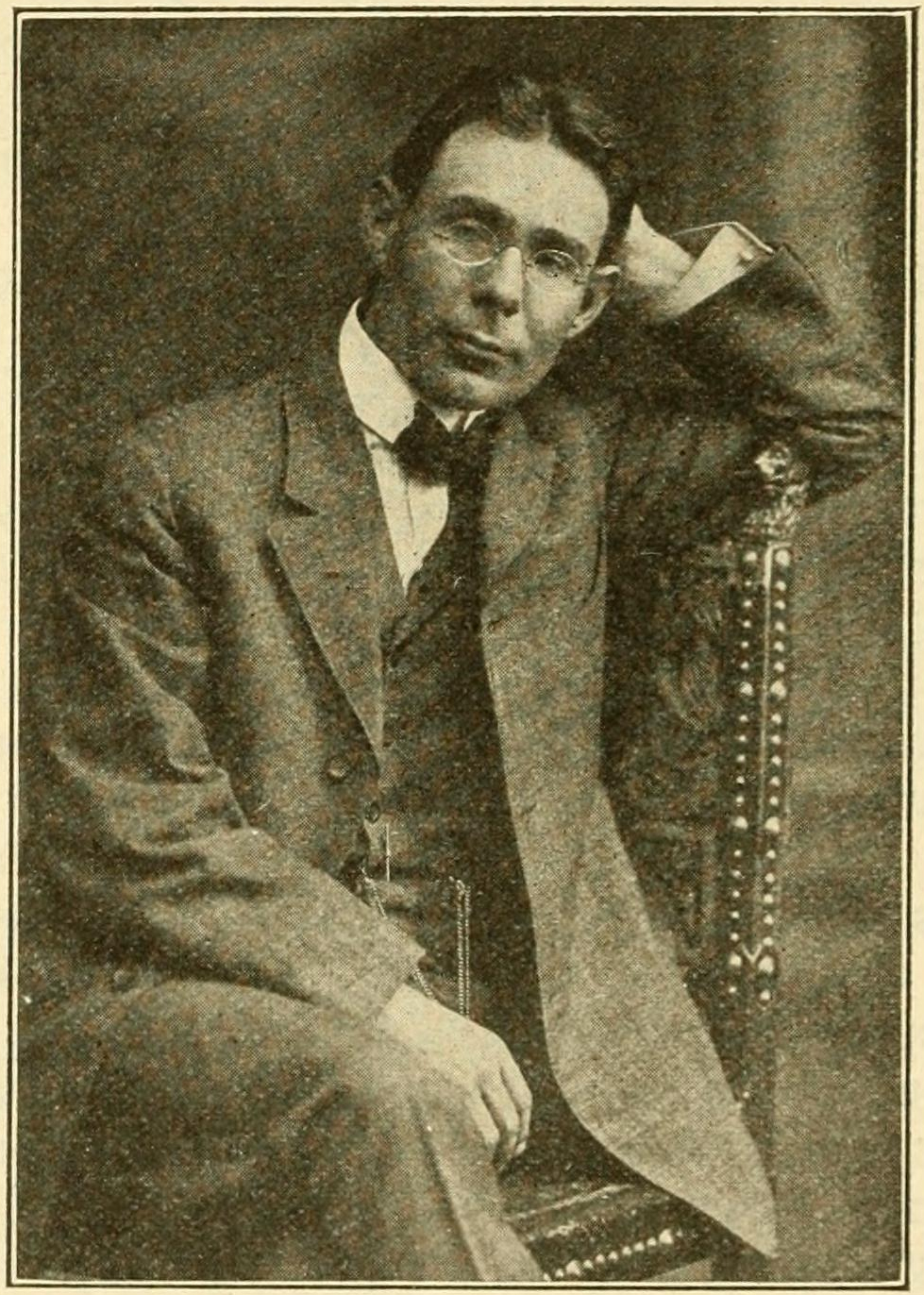
Boudin in Di Tsukunft, 1907

Boudin wrote his first political articles on aesthetics and the materialist conception of history (historical materialism). From May 1905 through October 1906, Boudin wrote a series of articles expounding upon Marxism which were published in the Chicago magazine The International Socialist Review. These articles were collected in book form as The Theoretical System of Karl Marx in the Light of Recent Criticism in February 1907. The title was published by the leading radical publishing house of the day, Charles H. Kerr & Co., and was kept in print continuously over the next two decades through several reissue editions. The book, a defense of such orthodox Marxist tenets as the labor theory of value and historical materialism against their critics of the day, established Boudin's place as one of the foremost American authorities on Marxism among a generation of young political activists.

Together with Ludwig Lore and Louis C. Fraina, Boudin was a founding editor of The Class Struggle, a Marxist theoretical magazine which first saw print in May 1917. The Class Struggle published news and commentary about revolutionary socialist events in Europe, including translations of works by some of the leading figures of the Zimmerwald Left, and was an important influence on the formation of the Left Wing Section of the Socialist Party in 1919 — a group which provided the core of the Communist Party of America and Communist Labor Party later in that year. Boudin had left the project by this juncture, however, as a brief notice in the September–October 1918 issue indicated that he had resigned his position as an editor and member of the Socialist Publication Society owing to "differences concerning the policy of the magazine."

== Later life ==
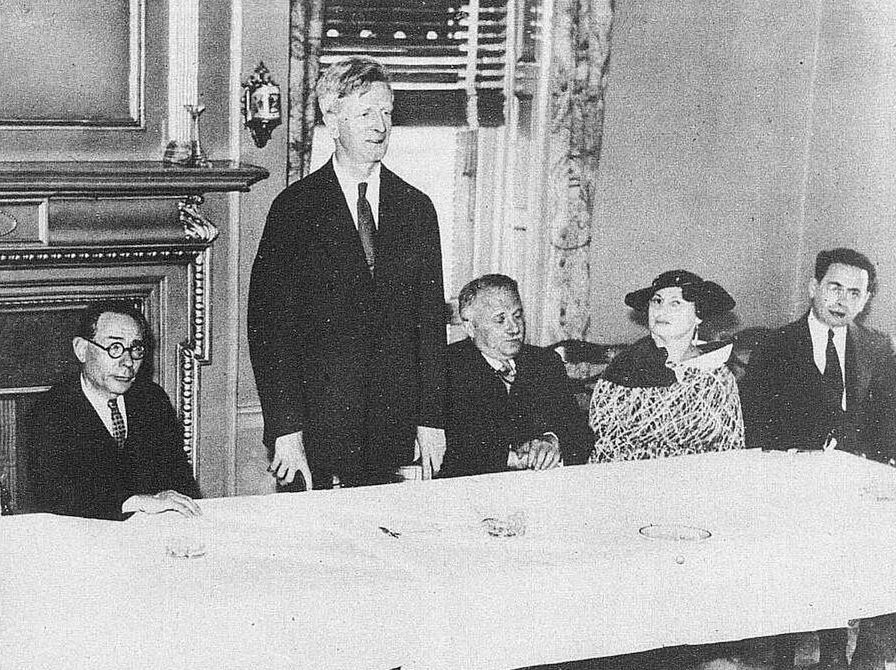
Boudin (seated, far left) at a meeting of the American ORT, 1934. (L-R): Louis B. Boudin, James Grover McDonald, Henry Moskowitz, Florence Dolowitz, Philip Block.

After the formation of the Communist Labor Party of America and the Communist Party of America, Boudin shied away from organized politics but taught in the Communist Party-sponsored Workers' School in New York in the late 1920s and occasionally contributed articles to the CP's artistic magazine, The New Masses, in the second half of the 1930s.

Boudin repudiated communism by 1940, but remained a staunch defender of the civil liberties of Communist Party members.

Throughout the 1930s and the 1940s, Boudin was a frequent contributor of book reviews to scholarly journals such as the Columbia Law Review, The American Journal of Sociology, and The Journal of Politics.

In addition to working as a lawyer, winning several cases related to the rights of workers to organize trade unions, Boudin also wrote the two volume, Government by Judiciary, revisiting a topic with which he had dealt in a previous shorter book. In it, although it was never much read by the radical movement of his day, Boudin argued that the democratic rights of the people had been usurped by the judicial branch of government. While not influential with political activists of the period, Boudin's book remained in use among law students for decades, according to historian Paul Buhle.

== Death and legacy ==
Boudin died after a long illness, in his apartment in Manhattan, New York City, May 29, 1952.

His papers reside at Columbia University in New York City and include the manuscript of an unpublished book, Order Out of Chaos, a study of economic crises.

Boudin's family has continued to be prominent on the political left. His nephew Leonard Boudin was a civil-liberties attorney who represented clients like Daniel Ellsberg, Paul Robeson, Julian Bond, and William Sloan Coffin. Leonard's children are federal judge Michael Boudin and Weather Underground member Kathy Boudin. Kathy's son Chesa Boudin was the district attorney of the city of San Francisco until a voter recall removed him from office in June 2022.

== Works ==
=== Books ===
- The Theoretical System of Karl Marx in the Light of Recent Criticism. Chicago: Charles H. Kerr & Co., 1907.
- Government by Judiciary. Boston: Ginn & Company, 1911.
- Socialism and War, New York: New Review Publishing Co., 1916.
- Government by Judiciary. In two volumes. New York: William Godwin, 1932.
- Congressional and Agency Investigations: Their Uses and Abuses. n.c.: Virginia Law Review Association, 1949.

=== Articles ===
- "Stare Decisis, State Constitutions, and Impairing the Obligation of Contracts by Judicial Decisions." New York University Law Quarterly Review, vol. 11, nos. 1–2 (September–December 1933).
- "Has the Writ of Habeas Corpus Been Abolished in New York?" Columbia Law Review, vol. 35, no. 6 (June 1935), pp. 850–872. In JSTOR
- "The Supreme Court and Civil Rights," Science & Society, vol. 1, no. 3 (Spring 1937), pp. 273–309. In JSTOR
- "The Sherman Act and Labor Disputes: Part I," Columbia Law Review, vol. 39, no. 8 (Dec. 1939), pp. 1283–1337. In JSTOR
- "The Sherman Act and Labor Disputes: Part II," Columbia Law Review, vol. 40, no. 1 (Jan. 1940), pp. 14–51. In JSTOR
- "State Poll Taxes and the Federal Constitution," Virginia Law Review, vol. 28, no. 1 (Nov. 1941), pp. 1–25. In JSTOR
- "Wanted: An Integrated System of Labor Law," Journal of Politics, vol. 4, no. 1 (Feb. 1942), pp. 20–46. In JSTOR
- "Organized Labor and the Clayton Act: Part I," Virginia Law Review, vol. 29, no. 3 (Dec. 1942), pp. 272–315. In JSTOR
- "Organized Labor and the Clayton Act: Part II," Virginia Law Review, vol. 29, no. 4 (Jan. 1943), pp. 395–439. In JSTOR
- "Congressional and Agency Investigations: Their Uses and Abuses," Virginia Law Review, vol. 35, no. 2 (Feb. 1949), pp. 143–213. In JSTOR
- "'Seditious Doctrines' and the 'Clear and Present Danger' Rule: Part I," Virginia Law Review, vol. 38, no. 2 (Feb. 1952), pp. 143–186. In JSTOR
- "'Seditious Doctrines' and the 'Clear and Present Danger' Rule: Part II," Virginia Law Review, vol. 38, no. 3 (April 1952), pp. 315–356. In JSTOR

== See also ==
- Leonard Boudin
- Michael Boudin
- Kathy Boudin
- Chesa Boudin
