= Leonard Boudin =

American lawyer (1912–1989)

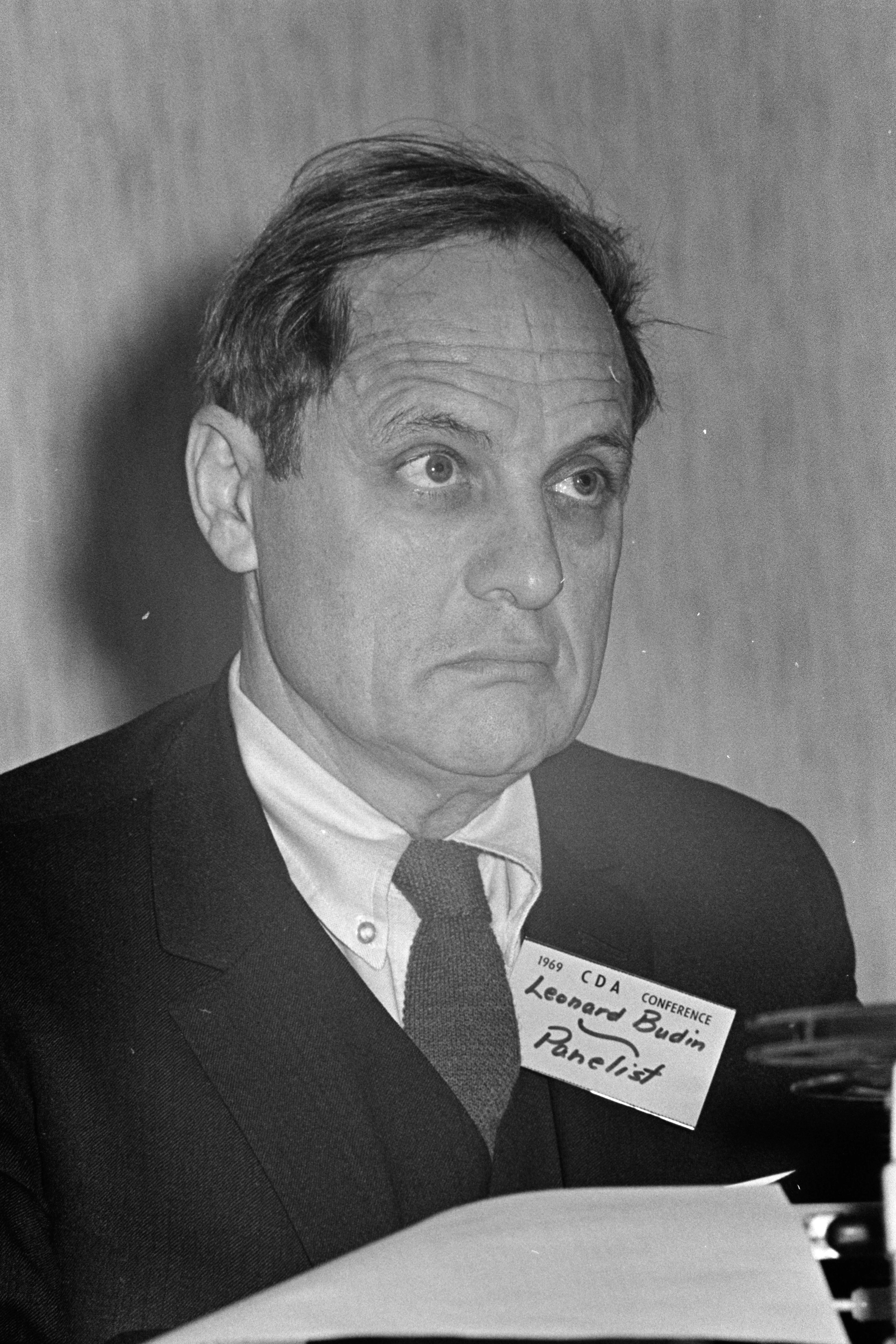
- Boudin in 1969
- Born: July 20, 1912; New York City, U.S.
- Died: November 24, 1989 (aged 77); New York City, U.S.
- Education: City College of New York (BS); St. John's University (LLB)
- Occupation: Lawyer
- Spouse: Jean Roisman (m. 1937)
- Children: Michael and Kathy
- Relatives: Louis B. Boudin (uncle); Chesa Boudin (grandson)

Leonard B. Boudin (July 20, 1912 – November 24, 1989) was an American civil liberties attorney and left-wing activist who represented Daniel Ellsberg of Pentagon Papers fame and Benjamin Spock, the author of Baby and Child Care, who advocated draft resistance during the Vietnam War. Other opponents of the Vietnam War whom he represented were Julian Bond, William Sloane Coffin, and Philip Berrigan.

== Early life and education ==
Boudin was born in Brooklyn, New York on July 20, 1912, the son of Clara (Hessner) and Joseph Boudin, Jewish immigrants; his uncle was lawyer Louis B. Boudin. His parents had emigrated from Russia and Austria. He graduated from the City College of New York with a BS in 1931, and from St. John's University Law School with an LLB in 1935.

== Career ==
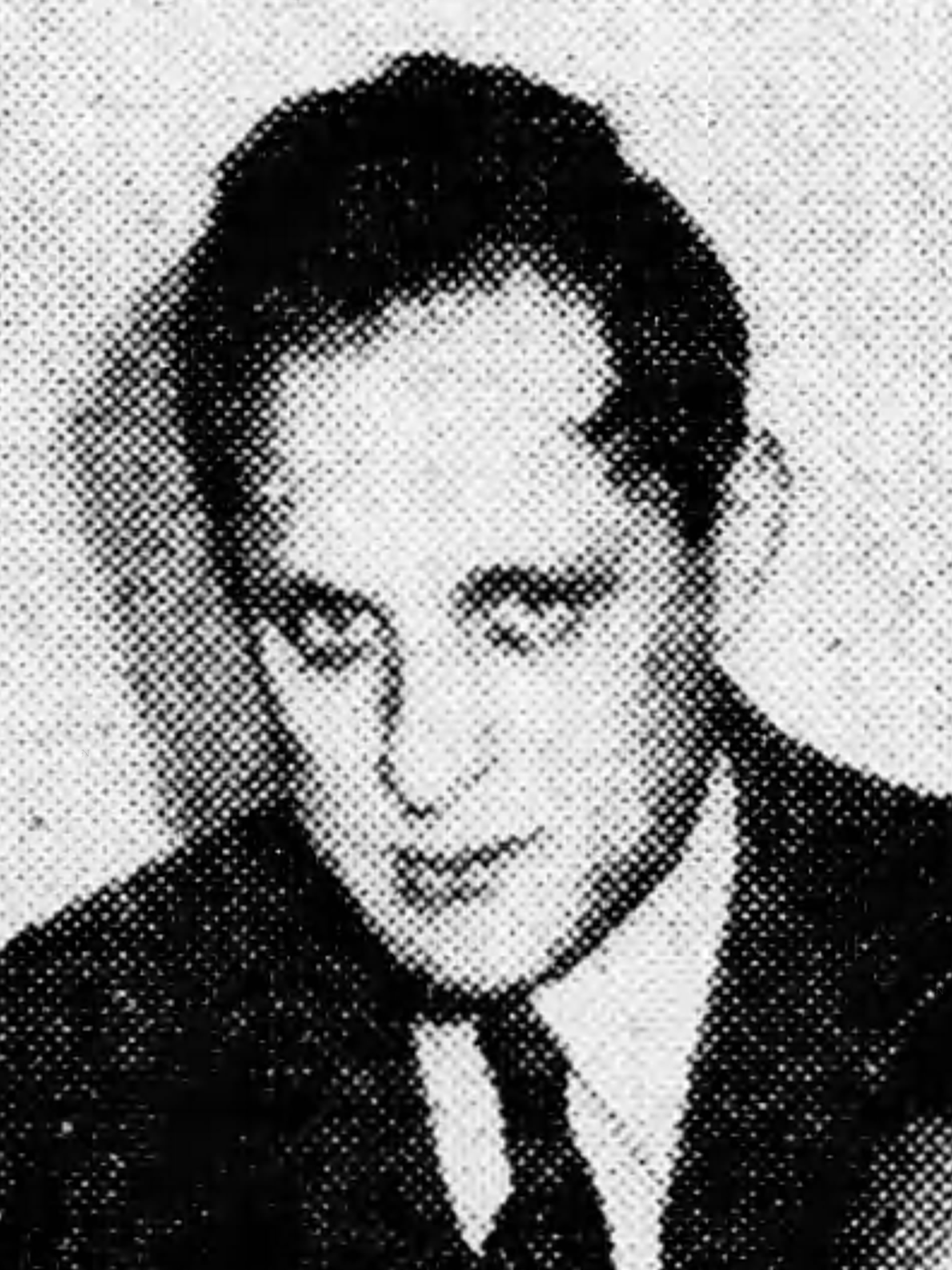
Boudin in 1950

He represented other controversial clients including the Church of Scientology, Judith Coplon, Jimmy Hoffa, the revolutionary socialist government of Cuba, and Paul Robeson. Boudin also often represented those persons subpoenaed by the House Un-American Activities Committee thought or known to have Marxist views or Communist affiliations, such as Mary van Kleeck. Boudin was counsel to the National Emergency Civil Liberties Committee and a member of the National Lawyers Guild. He was the law partner of Victor Rabinowitz, himself counsel to numerous left-wing organizations and individuals.

Boudin argued and won unanimously the first case in which the United States Supreme Court invalidated a federal statute under the Free Speech Clause of the First Amendment, Lamont v. Postmaster General. He also argued and won the landmark case Kennedy v. Mendoza-Martinez, in which the Supreme Court held that draft dodgers could not be stripped of their citizenship without being criminally prosecuted and afforded the protections promised to criminal defendants in the Fifth and Sixth Amendments. He successfully argued the landmark case Kent v. Dulles, which established a right to international travel for individuals holding suspect views.

The papers of Boudin and Rabinowitz' law firm, ultimately Rabinowitz, Boudin, Standard, Krinsky and Lieberman, P.C., indicate work for, among others, Dashiell Hammett, James Hoffa, Rockwell Kent, Alger Hiss, the Fellowship of Reconciliation, unions (including the American Communications Association) and other organizations.

Boudin also taught as a visiting professor and lecturer at a variety of institutions, including Harvard Law School (1970-1971), Yale Law School (1974), UC Berkeley School of Law (1975; 1986), the University of Southern California (1976), Hofstra University School of Law (1978), the University of Colorado Boulder (1979), the University of Washington (1980), Stanford Law School (1985) and Shanghai University (1987).

== Personal life and death ==
Boudin died of a heart attack at St. Vincent's Hospital in Manhattan, New York on November 24, 1989.

Boudin was the nephew of Louis Boudin, an influential Socialist, labor lawyer and professor of constitutional law at Yale University. His brother-in-law was influential left-wing journalist I. F. Stone.

He married Jean Roisman, a poet, in 1937. Together they had two children, Michael and Kathy, who achieved recognition in later life. Michael Boudin became a jurist and was a judge of the United States Court of Appeals for the First Circuit, serving as its chief judge 2001-2008. Kathy Boudin was an activist and co-founder of the 1960s radical group the Weather Underground, who served 22 years in prison for her role in a 1981 robbery that left two police officers and a security guard dead. His only biological grandson, Chesa Boudin, Kathy's son, was the district attorney of San Francisco from 2020 to 2022.

== See also ==
- Louis B. Boudin
- Michael Boudin
- Kathy Boudin
- Chesa Boudin
- Victor Rabinowitz
- I.F. Stone
- National Emergency Civil Liberties Committee
- National Lawyers Guild
