= Pietro and Maria Botto House =

- U.S. National Register of Historic Places
- U.S. National Historic Landmark
- New Jersey Register of Historic Places
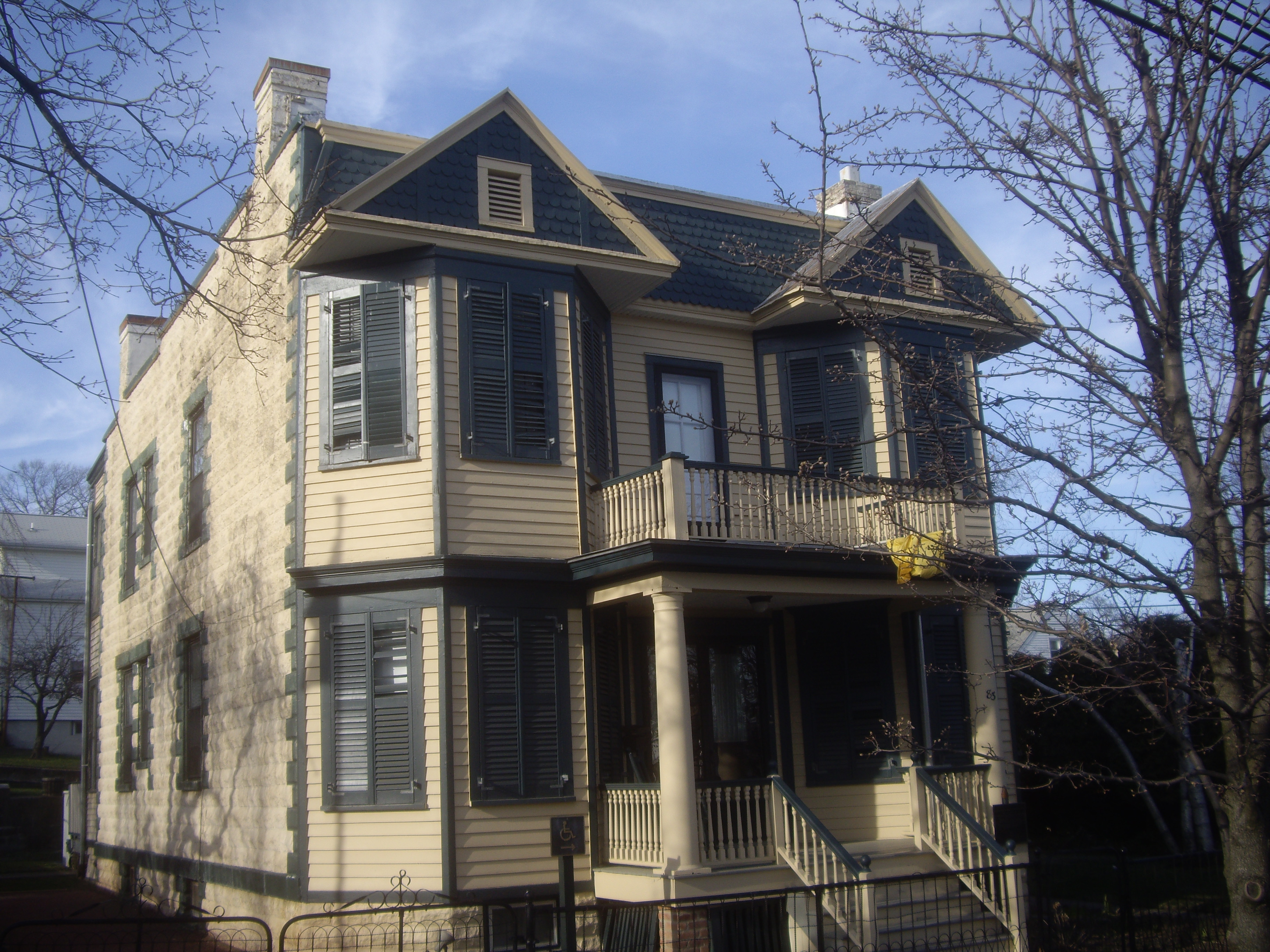

- Location within Passaic County, New Jersey Location within New Jersey Location within the United States
- Location: 83 Norwood Street, Haledon, New Jersey
- Coordinates: 40°56′5.14″N 74°11′19.36″W
- Built: 1908
- NRHP reference No.: 74001188
- NJRHP No.: 2333

Significant dates
- Added to NRHP: July 30, 1974
- Designated NHL: December 17, 1982
- Designated NJRHP: July 1, 1974

The Pietro and Maria Botto House, also known as Pietro Botto House, at 83 Norwood Street, Haledon in Passaic County, New Jersey, United States, is where leaders of the Industrial Workers of the World (IWW) union spoke to the 25,000 striking workers of the Paterson Silk Strike of 1913.

== History ==
=== Early 1900s ===
The original owners, Pietro Botto (1864–1945) and his wife Maria Boggio (1870–1915) were both immigrants from Biella, Italy. They married in 1885 and arrived in the United States in 1892 with their first daughter, Albina. The couple lived in West Hoboken (now Union City, New Jersey) for fifteen years and had there three more daughters, Adelia, Eva, and Olga. They saved their money until they could afford to build their own home in Haledon. In 1908 they finally moved into their new home, which was large enough to accommodate the entire family and included three additional rooms on the second floor that were rented for additional income.

Pietro Botto and the couple's daughters worked as weavers in that town's Cedar Cliffs mills, while Maria did some "outwork", cleaning and snipping imperfections from finished bolts of silk. In weekdays, she also served meals to boarders and working men in her dining room. As it was situated on a country hillside near the trolley line, especially on Sundays and holidays the Botto House became a popular meeting place with its bocce court, the card tables and the cooking provided by Maria and her daughters.

During the Paterson Silk Strike of 1913, Paterson's mayor refused to allow the strikers to assembly in the city. Pietro and Maria Botto, at the urging of Big Bill Haywood, invited the strike organizers to hold rallies at their home in nearby Haledon, where the workers were not on strike, counting on the support of the local socialist major William Brueckman. The Botto House became the Sunday rallying point from March 3 to the end of the strike in June. During this time Maria kept the house in order and fed the activists who addressed the crowd either from the balcony or from in front of the house. In addition to Haywood, these speakers included Upton Sinclair, Carlo Tresca, Elizabeth Gurley Flynn, Adolph Lessig and Patrick L. Quinlan. Despite not being part of the strike himself, Pietro could not find work after the strike, nor could his daughter Eva, who was blacklisted. Maria got sick and died only two years after the silk strike.

=== 1980s - present ===
Because it served as a haven for free speech and assembly for the laborers, the Botto House was placed on both the New Jersey Register of Historic Places and the U.S. National Register of Historic Places in 1974. It was declared a National Historic Landmark in 1982, the first Italian American site to be placed on the nation's most distinguished roster of historic sites.

In 1983 the Pietro and Maria Botto House opened to the public as the American Labor Museum, a non-profit 501(c) educational institution that commemorates the events of 1913 and more in general, is dedicated to "teaching the public about the history and contemporary issues of workers, the workplace, and organized labor with special attention to the ethnicity of working people." The museum features changing exhibits, restored period rooms and Old World Gardens that reflect the lifestyle of an immigrant family of the early 1900s, and a free lending library. It also offers lectures, poetry readings, teachers' workshops, and other educational programs.

Each year, the American Labor Museum gives out the Sol Stetin awards, which "honor outstanding individuals for their contributions toward improving the lives of working people." Previous recipients include:

- Mary Kay Henry
- John Nichols (journalist)
- Edward Smith (trade unionist)
- James Sinegal
- Loretta Weinberg

== See also ==
- List of National Historic Landmarks in New Jersey
- National Register of Historic Places listings in Passaic County, New Jersey
- List of museums in New Jersey
