= New Jersey Library Association =

American library organization

- Abbreviation: NJLA
- Formation: 1890
- Type: Library association
- Location: Bordentown, New Jersey
- Region served: New Jersey
- Executive Director: Brett Bonfield
- Main organ: Executive Board
- Affiliations: American Library Association
- Website: http://www.njla.org

The New Jersey Library Association (NJLA) is a library organization located in Bordentown, New Jersey. It was established in 1890, and is the oldest library organization in the State of New Jersey. The NJLA began in 1890 with 39 members, and currently has over 1,700. The organization states on its website that it "Advocates for library services for New Jersey residents; Provides education and networking for library staff;" and "Supports intellectual freedom and access to books, music, movies, and information."

== History ==
=== 1890 – 1950 ===
On December 29, 1890, 39 charter member libraries formed the New Jersey Library Association and elected their first president, William Prall. Prall, a New Jersey State Assembly member from Passaic County, served as president from 1890–1891. He had previously introduced the state library law in 1884. The original purpose of the organization was "to instill in the minds of assistants a love of the work in which they are engaged". The organization helped to promote state legislation benefiting libraries, and successfully pushed forward passage of the state Traveling Library Law for rural librarians in 1899. It helped promote the law which established the New Jersey Public Library Commission in 1900.

In 1905, the organization helped to set up a summer school for librarians, and in 1922, assisted in the establishment of a "graded summer school for library service". The organization's publication New Jersey Libraries has appeared continuously in various formats since 1911. In 1927, the NJLA assisted the Public Library Commission in forming a library school at the Douglass College, then known as New Jersey College for Women.

=== 1950 – present ===
The NJLA was officially incorporated on April 19, 1951, and structured with an Executive Board to oversee operations. The NJLA has published several studies on the services offered by public and county libraries, including the reports Library Service for the People of New Jersey in 1953, Libraries for the People of New Jersey, or Knowledge for All in 1963, and Interim Goals for a New Jersey Library Development Program in 1977. The Grievance Committee was established by the organization in 1962 to investigate grievances of librarians and maintain professional standards. The Intellectual Freedom Committee was established in the same year, and acts against censorship. The Intellectual Freedom Committee has presented testimony before New Jersey state committees, in opposition to legislation regulating obscenity and pornography. In October 1976, the association passed a resolution that all "future publications and official documents of NJLA avoid terminology which perpetuates sex stereotyping, and that existent publications and official documents, as they are revised, be changed to avoid such terminology". In 1991, the organization sponsored Books for Kids, a statewide program which encourages children to read by themselves.

The NJLA supported the American Library Association's position in challenging the 2001 Children's Internet Protection Act, which mandates public libraries install pornography filters on computers with Internet access in order for the libraries to receive federal funding. The Act was upheld by the Supreme Court of the United States in a 2003 decision. "Obviously we feel it's a very difficult decision to implement. There's no guidance on how to implement it. There's a lot of confusion about what's going to happen and what requirements would have to be followed if federal funds were obtained," said NJLA executive director Patricia Tumulty in a statement about the decision to The Star-Ledger. Tumulty said that the law would disproportionately affect libraries with less available funding. In 2002, the NJLA and corporate sponsor, the Verizon Foundation, started the nonprofit charity program New Jersey Reads to encourage literacy among the 2 million people in New Jersey who have trouble reading. New Jersey Reads was started with US$325,000 in funding from Verizon. In 2003, the NJLA organized a seminar for approximately 150 librarians, educating them on how to protect readers' privacy in light of the USA PATRIOT Act. "We are grappling with this – we are a country at war and everyone wants to be patriotic, but they're forgetting the First Amendment," said one librarian who attended the convention. The association organizes the One Book New Jersey program, and chooses one book for each age group to promote literacy. In 2003, then-First Lady Dina Matos McGreevey was the spokeswoman for One Book New Jersey. One Book New Jersey was developed by the NJLA and the New Jersey State Library.

== Advocacy ==
The NJLA advocate for the Library Bill of Rights and the Freedom to Read Statement published by the ALA. Their website contains articles and resources for public users to educate themselves and to assist their involvement in their communities. The causes that the NJLA advocate for include the fight against censorship, the spreading of awareness about state legislature, and the providing of resources for school libraries and librarians. The NJLA supports intellectual freedom and their website claims that the "NJLA categorically rejects any effort to censor or remove materials from any library, based on content". They also spread awareness about state legislature as it relates to the library community. The website provides a yearly state budget update and a list of recently enacted library legislature for patrons to review. The NJLA also provides a link to a resource that assists users in finding and contacting their state legislator. In order to provide resources for school libraries and librarians, the NJLA also contains a link to the New Jersey Association of School Librarians (NJASL).

The NJLA also provides a list of Executive Board Statements and Resolutions that are available to the general public. This list, by default is sorted in chronological order from newest entry to oldest but includes a filter for quick navigation. In their effort to encourage intellectual freedom, awareness and participation in their communities, and access to education, the NJLA subscribes to a set of core values. A list of these core values can be reviewed on their website.

== Recognition ==
In 1977, the American Library Association presented the NJLA with the annual Grolier Award, which recognizes the "best public relations program promoting public library use". In its entry describing the association in the Encyclopedia of Library and Information Science, the encyclopedia notes: "Whatever will be accomplished, it may be prophesied without fear or contradiction that the NJLA will stand in the front row when a tally is taken of effective and steadfast library supporters."

== See also ==
- American Library Association
- List of libraries in the United States
- List of library associations
- New Jersey Association of School Librarians
- New Jersey State Library
- New Jersey Digital Highway
