= New Jersey Digital Highway =

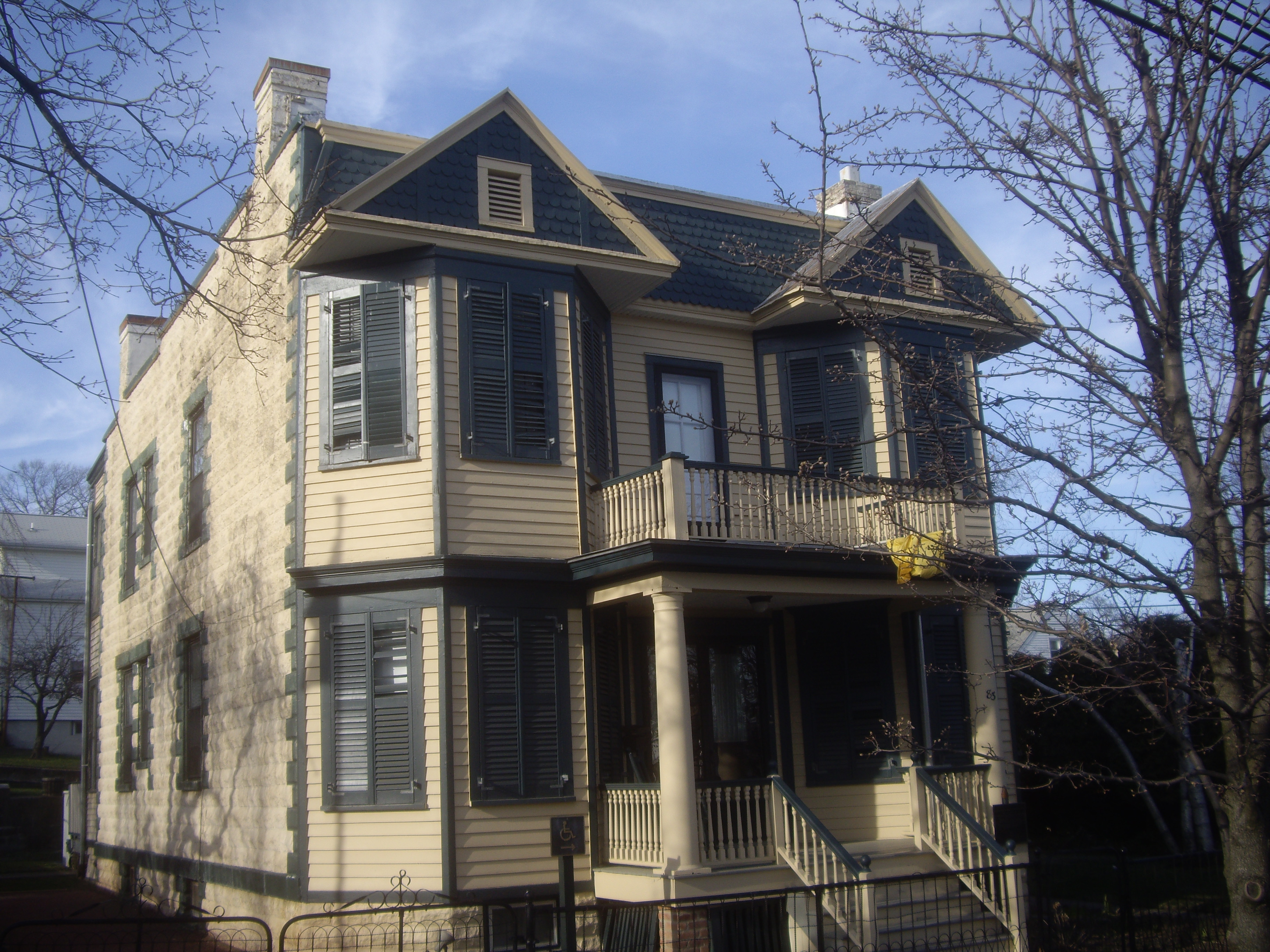
The Pietro and Maria Botto House is one of the cultural institutions contributing to the New Jersey Digital Highway.

The New Jersey Digital Highway (NJDH) is a collaborative initiative led by cultural heritage institutions—including libraries, museums, archives, state agencies and other organizations—in New Jersey to provide online access to cultural and historical information about the state. The main participating institutions include Rutgers University Libraries, the New Jersey State Library, the New Jersey Department of Archives and Records Management, the Pietro and Maria Botto House, and the New Jersey Historical Society, with other institutions around the state providing additional collections.

NJDH is designed to provide long-term preservation and access to cultural and historical artifacts in digital form. Its standard of digitization is a minimum of 600 dpi. The technology infrastructure is the FEDORA repository architecture, coupled with a data model and metadata implementation that provides access and management for digital resources and their analog source artifacts. NJDH provides guidance on digital encoding standards for images, text, and audiovisual files. NJDH also includes a manual on creating and sharing digital resources and offers a web-based workflow management system tool for submitting resources and metadata.

The mission of NJDH is "shared access, local control." It is designed to support collaboration and to provide participating organizations the opportunity to showcase their own collections, even as those collections are maintained and managed by the New Jersey Digital Highway repository architecture. The main person to contact for this project is Linda Langschied, Digital Projects Manager for Rutgers University Libraries.

== History ==
In 2003, the New Jersey Digital Highway was created, funded in part from an approximately $500,000 National Leadership grant awarded by the Institute for Museum and Library Services. The term "highway" was used as a metaphor for linking separate "islands" of information.

After 3.5 years, the NJDH was able to meet all the goals it had set out in its proposals, including the digitization of over 10,000 objects and participation from 17 cultural institutions. At the time of the final grant report written in the mid-2000s, the NJDH reported that its homepage acquired three thousand unique visitors a month, averaging eight to ten thousand visits per month.

In September 2006, a research survey was conducted to determine usefulness, navigation, user lostness, terminology, and layout of the website. Overall, the response to the website was positive, out of 145 participants only 7% reported a negative experience.

In response to the Virginia Tech shooting in 2007, Virginia Tech contacted the Rutgers University Libraries for assistance in creating a digital repository and memorial that used a similar implementation of FEDORA as the New Jersey Digital Highway. Northwestern University, Pennsylvania State University, and Princeton University also adapted Rutger's FEDORA platform and Workflow Management System for their own uses.

=== Theme ===
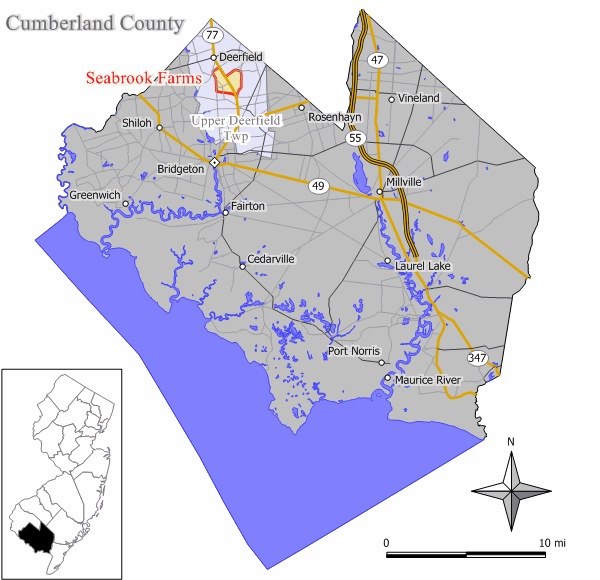
The immigrant experience in places such as Seabrook Farms, outlined in red, was the first theme of the NJDH.

The inaugural collection for the NJDH focused on the theme "The Changing Face of New Jersey: The Immigrant Experience from Earliest Times to the Present", since New Jersey has historically been known as the "gateway state" for new immigrants arriving at Ellis Island and the "garden state" for its multicultural population. The immigrant experience in New Jersey is rich and varied, particularly as exemplified by the Seabrook Farms experience. Seabrook Farms, a family-owned frozen vegetable packing plant, recruited Japanese Americans from internment camps, beginning in January 1944. As World War II ended, they were joined by displaced persons from Eastern Europe, resulting in a rich multicultural community. The New Jersey Digital Highway documents this vanishing way of life in photographs, oral histories and written remembrances.

Another prominent theme for the project, which intertwined with the immigrant experience, was the New Jersey labor movement, with many leaders who were first or second generation immigrants. The American Labor Museum, today known as the Botto House National Landmark, has a collection that includes papers and photographs from prominent Textile Workers' Union leader Sol Stetin as well as images and documents that convey the flavor and vigor of working class life at the turn of the 19th century.

== Collections ==
The New Jersey Digital Highway offers four portals of information for specific audiences: the general public, educators, students, and the librarians, archivists and curators in New Jersey's cultural heritage institutions. Genealogy resources, working with digital primary sources, for educators and students, as well as lesson plans and educational activities are offered.

The New Jersey Digital Highway collection features a selection of resources from a broad range of libraries, museums and archives, including:

- Seabrook Farms Educational and Cultural Center
- Botto House National Landmark
- New Jersey State Library
- Newark Museum

With a grant from the New Jersey Historical Commission, the Monmouth County Historical Association added photographs from the Pach brothers to the online repository.

The Clarence Dillon Public Library digitized their Anne O'Brien Historical collection. The Roseland Free Public Library has also digitized donated historical photographs of Roseland, New Jersey.

The Digital Highway Collection gives guidance on creating standards-based digital collections in every format, addressing copyright issues, selecting collections to digitize and marketing to users. The general user portal has a broad range of information on New Jersey, from primary sources, to fun activities "off the beaten path" to explore New Jersey history and culture. One example page discusses the legend of the Jersey Devil.

=== Jersey City Public Library ===
With a grant by the New Jersey State Library, the Jersey City Free Public Library contributed a collection on the Dutch Immigrants in Jersey City. The initial contribution to NJDH included 3,700 pages of books and pamphlets, 22 photos, 4 maps, and 40 document and manuscript items ranging from 1 to nearly 300 pages.

=== Atlantic County Library System ===
The Atlantic County Library System utilized the service to create a browsable collection of artifacts from its Egg Harbor City German Project, which is organized and accessed at the library system's website but draws dynamically from the New Jersey Digital Highway repository through a search portal. This project resulted in the digitization of more than 30,000 immigration records and thousands of photos.

== Education modules ==
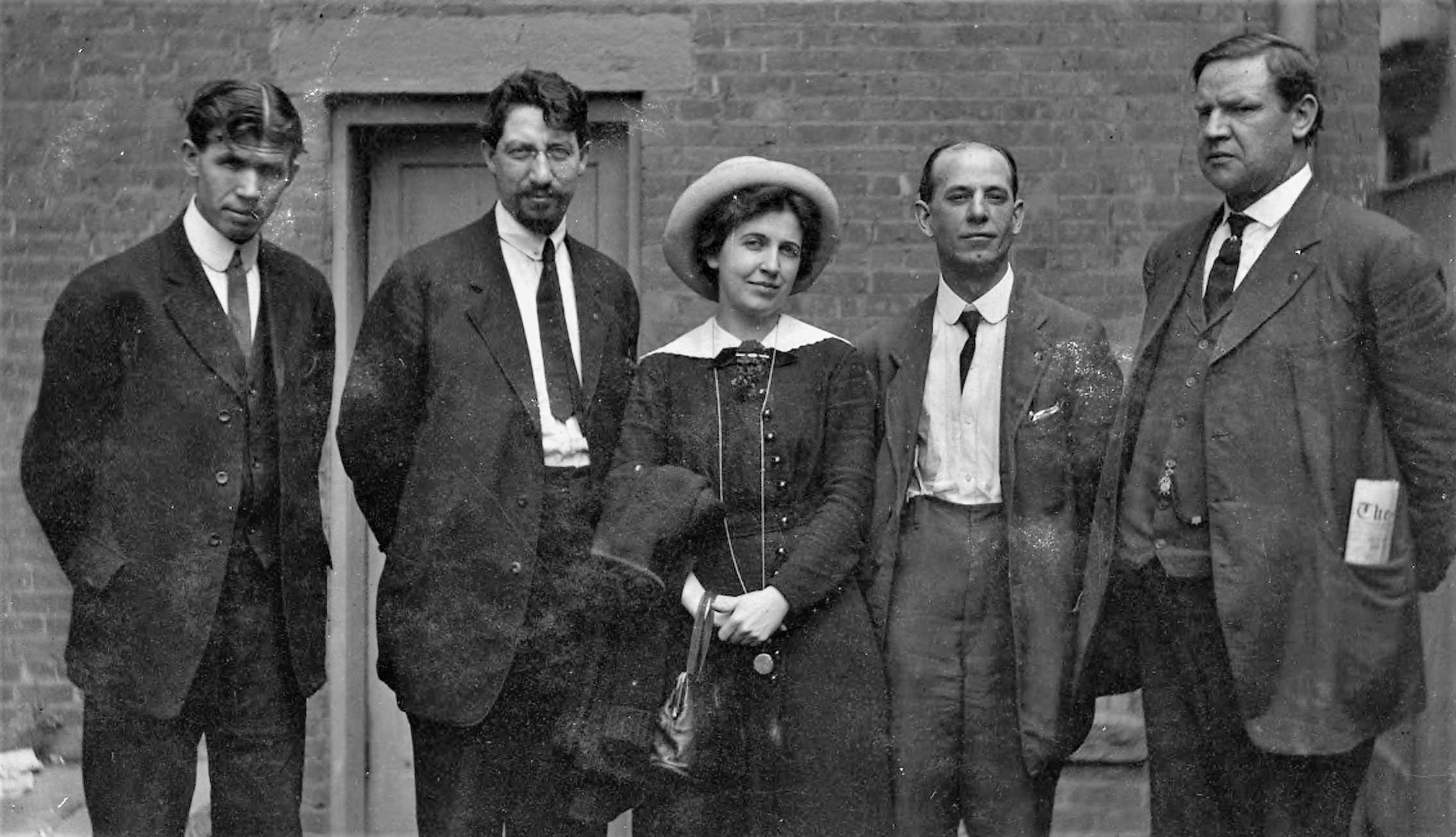
The Paterson Silk Strike of 1913 (strike leaders pictured) is one of the NJDH's education modules.

In February 2011, the former website Electronic New Jersey moved locations to the NJDH. The move provided 23 education modules with instructional activities and assessments about various New Jersey-related topics.

The New Jersey Digital Highway has created several education modules that can be used by teachers and students in school. Initial module topics included the following:

- "Bound for Freedom: The Underground Railroad in New Jersey"
- "New Jersey: A Melting Pot, Mosaic, or..."
- "A New Jersey Global Village"
- "Cold War Immigration"
- "Fields of Opportunity – Fields of Exploitation"
- "Immigrant Children in New Jersey Schools"
- "New Jersey During the Great Depression"
- "The Americanization of Giuseppe, Murray, and Patrick"
- "The Racial Discrimination of Japanese Americans"
- "The Newest Immigration"

In 2005 and 2010 other modules were added to the original 23. More recent education modules have included:

- "Paterson Silk Strike of 1913"
- "Clifford Case—Questioning Executive Power"
- "Title IX and Women's Athletics—The Struggle for Equality"
- "Civil Rights at Rutgers"
- "Cold War Refugees and Rutgers"
