= 1913 Paterson silk strike =

Work stoppage involving silk mill workers in Paterson, New Jersey

Paterson silk strike
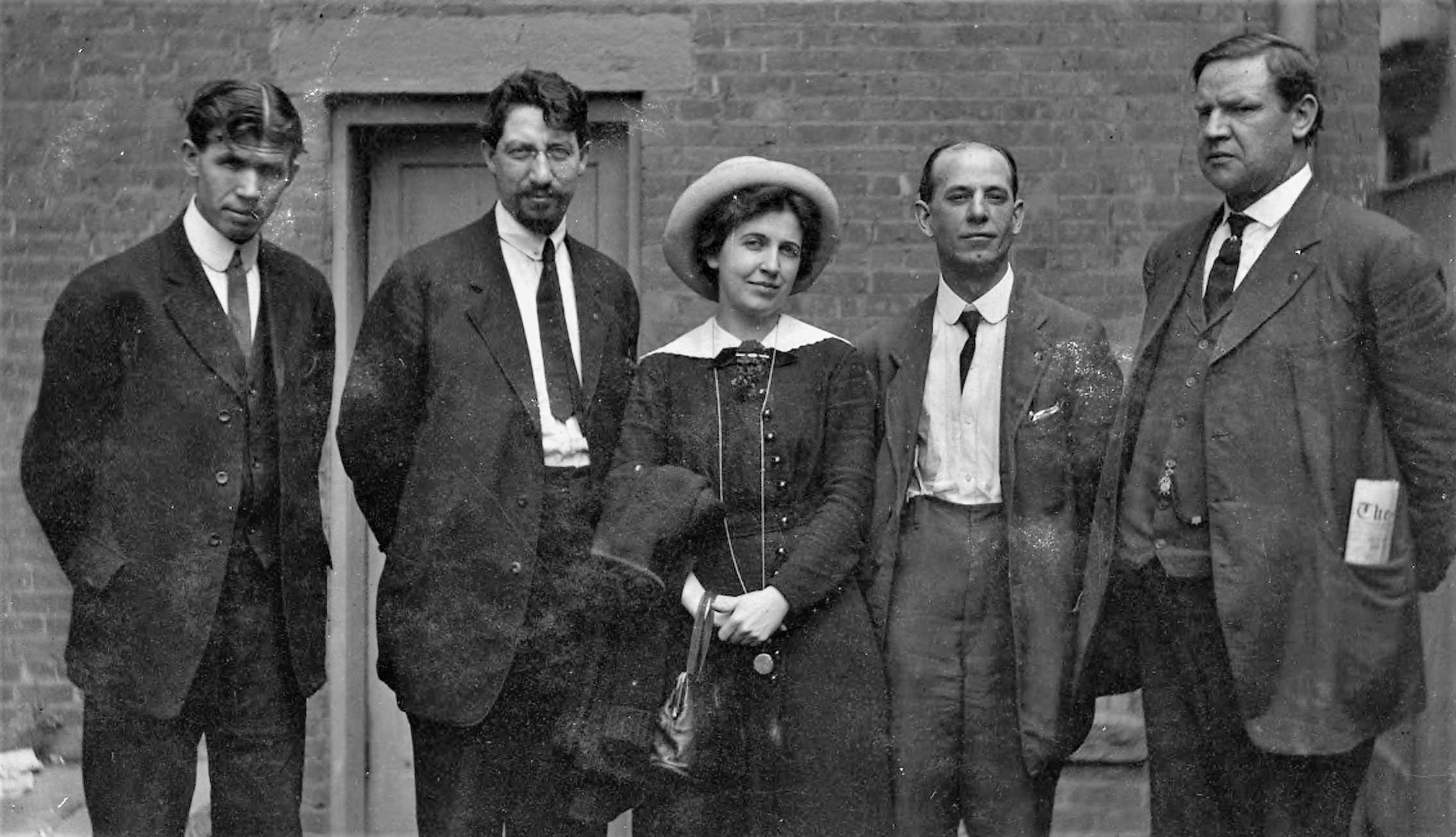
- Strike leaders Patrick L. Quinlan, Carlo Tresca, Elizabeth Gurley Flynn, Adolph Lessig, and Bill Haywood.
- Location: Paterson, New Jersey
- Goals: Eight-hour workday
- Methods: Strikes, protest, demonstrations

The 1913 Paterson silk strike was a work stoppage involving silk mill workers in Paterson, New Jersey. The strike involved demands for establishment of an eight-hour day and improved working conditions. The strike began on February 1, 1913, but didn't generalize until February 25, 1913. The strike ended five months later, on July 28. During the course of the strike, approximately 1,850 strikers were arrested, including Industrial Workers of the World (IWW) leaders Bill Haywood and Elizabeth Gurley Flynn.

== Background ==
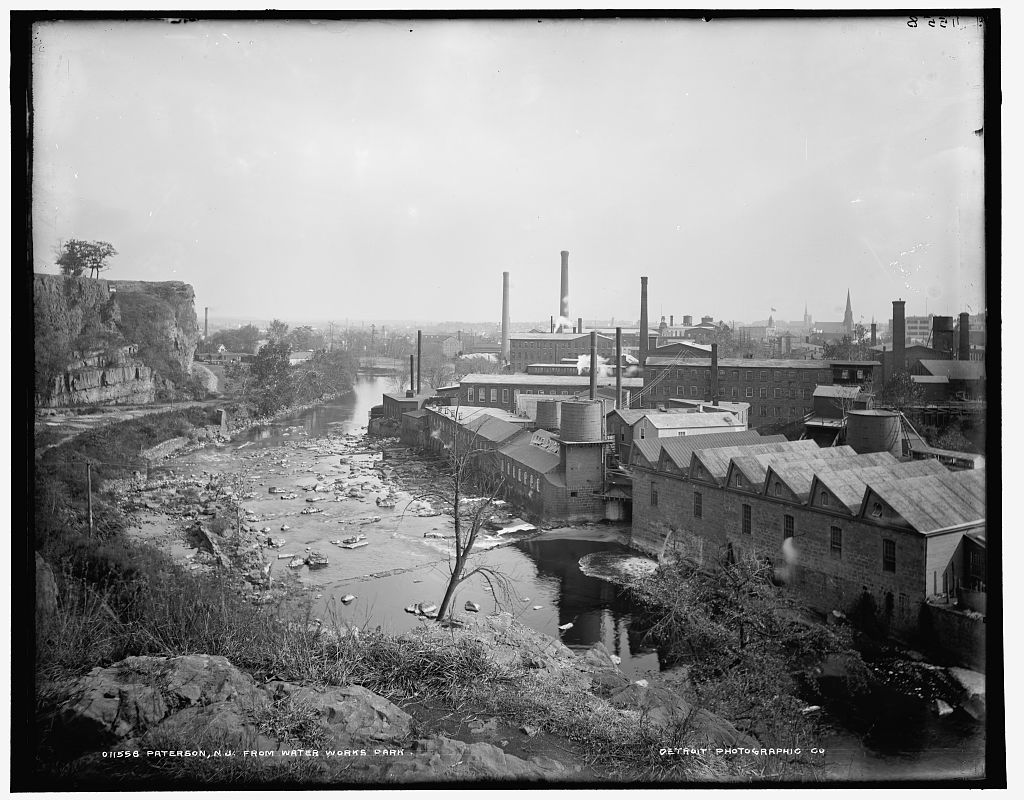
Paterson, New Jersey with the textile mills on the right, c. 1906.

Paterson's strike was part of a series of industrial strikes in the garment and textile industries of the American East from 1909 to 1913. The participants of these strikes were largely immigrant factory workers from southern and eastern Europe. Class division, race, gender, and manufacturing expertise all caused internal dissension among the striking parties and this led many reformist intellectuals in the Northeast to question their effectiveness. A major turning point for these labor movements occurred in 1912 during the Lawrence textile strike in Lawrence, Massachusetts, where laborers were able to successfully pressure mill owners to raise wages, later galvanizing support from left-leaning intellectual groups. The successful strike helped attract interest from intellectual circles in Paterson's labor movements, and gave union organizers confidence in also achieving improved working conditions and wages for Paterson's silk weavers.

The Paterson strikers mobilized after years of declining wages, continued poor working conditions, and long work days. The increasing number of women and children in the labor supply due to changing social customs and improved health through technological advances provided cheaper labor for mill owners and reduced demand for more expensive male laborers, bidding down their wages. In addition, technological advances in silk production reduced demand for skilled labor in the silk mills of Paterson. New technology in silk mills in Pennsylvania, Rhode Island, and Massachusetts which allowed weavers to run multiple looms at once posed significant competition to smaller New Jersey shops which manufactured silk much less efficiently and at a much higher cost. In response to these much larger corporate mills with multiple-loom systems – and in order to stay in business in the long run – New Jersey's mills had to respond by adopting the more efficient technology. Highly skilled weavers such as those in ribbon shops thus fought against multiple-loom systems. The reduced labor intensity of the new silk industry also meant that low skilled broad-silk weavers would be displaced and hurt by the industry changes. All weavers also wanted to shorten their work days and establish a certain minimum wage.

== Strike ==
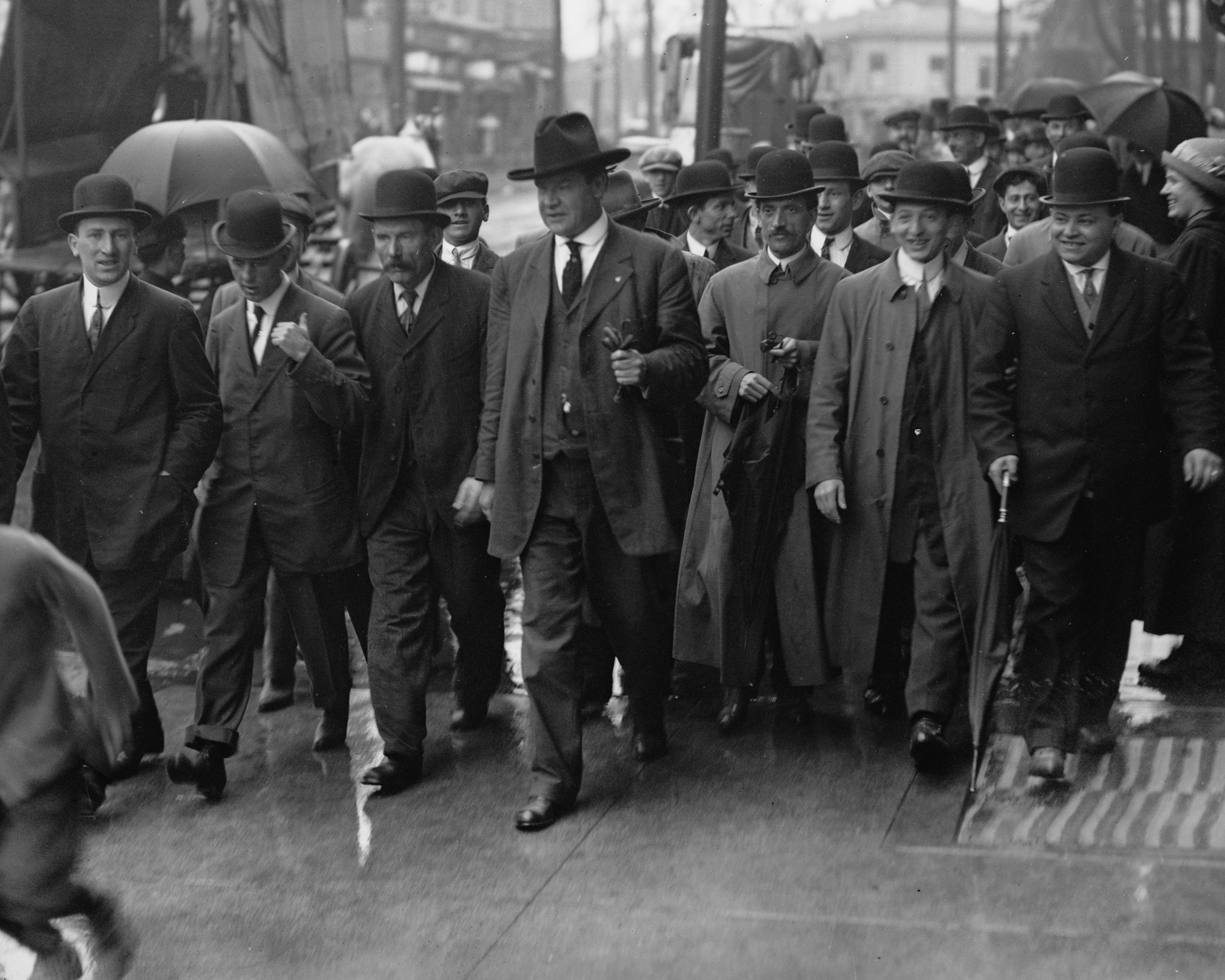
Bill Haywood and his entourage in Paterson during the silk strike.

The Industrial Workers of the World organization was the main outside agent behind both the Lawrence textile strike and the Paterson silk strike. On February 25, 1913, the first day of the strike, the IWW's prominent feminist leader Elizabeth Gurley Flynn was arrested after giving a talk on uniting strikers across racial boundaries. The authorities charged her and her fellow speakers with inciting violence through radical speech. Before the Senate Commission on Industrial Relations, police captain Andrew J. McBride upheld these charges, claiming that the revolutionary air among the textile mills was caused by and could be attributed to the IWW. Paterson's mayor at the time, Dr. Andrew F. McBride, also supported the idea that the strikes were primarily the result of the IWW's propaganda. Regardless, the strikes were carried out for months even after the arrest of IWW leaders, dispelling the notion that the workers were only agitated by outsiders.

The city's suspicion that IWW was responsible for radical protest tactics was in direct conflict with IWW philosophy. Labor leaders within the IWW promoted grassroots mobilization and allowed the strikers freedom to choose the direction of their militancy. Bill Haywood, a founding member of the IWW, helped Paterson strikers create democratically organized strike committee, representing all of the workers’ nationalities and not subject to the supervision of other more conservative and centralized labor groups. Paterson's strike was distinguished because of this decentralization.

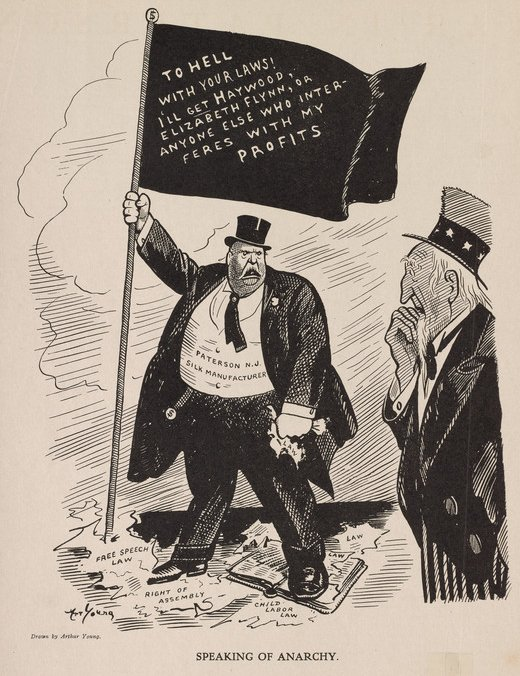
Political cartoon of a silk producer who is holding a flag on which is written "To hell with your laws! I'll get Haywood. Elizabeth Flynn, or anyone else who interferes with my profits."

The 1913 strike in Paterson was preempted by the Doherty Silk Company's construction of a modernized mill in nearby Clifton, New Jersey in 1911. The multiple-loom system of this mill upset workers who feared the inevitable transformation of all of Paterson's mills and the subsequent loss of jobs. In response, sixty weavers struck, beginning a string of union meetings with business agents to negotiate wages for silk workers in Paterson. The following year, Edwald Koettgen formed the Eight-Hour League in Paterson, championing the idea of an eight-hour work day, sowing the final seeds of the 1913 strike.

With the help of the IWW, Paterson silk workers were able to put together a general strike by recruiting thousands of workers. Two weeks into the strike, all types of weavers united to create a list of demands directed to mill owners and employers, ranging from minimum age restrictions to protect children to abolishing the multiple-loom systems to ensure the presence of jobs. It became clear that the protesters had different roles based on which job they were striking against. The ribbon weavers were skilled workers who, having previous militant struggles, helped to educate the strikers on their rights. Ribbon weavers were also advocates for higher wages, as they believed that since they were being more productive with the introduction of the looms, and thus their productivity rate was also higher, they should be getting paid more. They even went so far as to demand that the three- and four-loom systems be completely removed from the mills. The workers believed that the introduction of these mills was stealing jobs away from them and was also lowering their wages. Furthermore, socialism had long been a strong belief of the ribbon weavers, directly clashing with the capitalistic manufacturers and bosses. This resentment finally bubbled over in 1913 during the strikes under the ribbon workers rule of their then-current spokesman, Louis Magnet. Manufacturers responded with a seven-part statement criticizing the economic viability of the demands, among other concerns.

Ultimately, the strike ended in failure on July 28, 1913. Scholars cite an important reason for this failure as Paterson's necessary adaptation to the new machinery and new economics of the silk industry. Manufacturers would not acquiesce to the demands of strikers because they simply could not. Without producing goods at competitive prices through new machinery and cheap labor, they would otherwise have been put out of business by firms in Pennsylvania.

== Pageant in Madison Square Garden ==
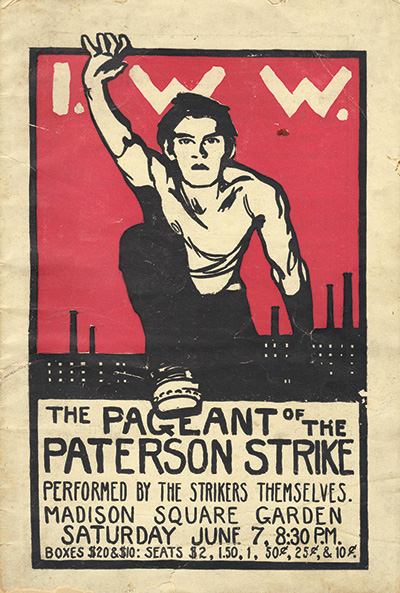
Industrial Workers of the World pageant poster

In an effort to support the strike financially and gain public support, several radical artists and intellectuals in New York City including Walter Lippman, Max Eastman, Mabel Dodge, and John Reed sympathetic to the striker's cause came up with the idea to organize a pageant play in which the events of the strike were reenacted. Haywood and the strike committee worked closely with John Reed on the writing and staging of the pageant, which integrated the strikers' ideas and lived experiences. Labor leaders involved developed and repurposed their own speeches for inclusion in the pageant and even wrote some of the music. Robert Edmond Jones, one of Reed's former classmates, was commissioned to design the set for the pageant. All in all between 800 and 1000 workers participated in the Paterson strike pageant, which was held at Madison Square Garden on June 7, 1913, and drew 150,000 attendees. The strikers were brought into Manhattan on a hired train and marched up Fifth Avenue in what was either a pre-show rally or performative protest before reaching the performance venue. The pageant was organized episodically and invited audience involvement to the extent that some critics have referred to the pageant as a public ritual.

== Defeat ==
Despite the minor success of the pageant, which still came at a loss (since the strikers were allowed in for 10 cents a piece or free instead of the full price of the dollar seats each) which operated at a loss of $2,000, the strikers were defeated. Still the IWW managed to help the hungry strikers children into foster homes to ease their way of life and provide food and aid while their parents and workers were striking. Although they had shut down Paterson and beaten off an attempt by the AFL (American Federation of Labor) to undercut the strike, they were unable to extend the strike to the annexes of the Paterson mills in Pennsylvania. Paterson manufacturers, victorious but frightened, held back for another decade. Strike supporters were torn apart as a result of the defeat, and the IWW never fully recovered in Eastern America.

== Legacy ==
Two were killed in the strike: bystander Valentino Modestino, fatally shot by a private guard on April 17, and striking worker Vincenzo Madonna, fatally shot by a strikebreaker on June 29.

The strike was featured in the 1981 film Reds. It is commemorated today at the Pietro and Maria Botto House National Landmark in Haledon, New Jersey, which served as a rallying point during the strike. In 1934, there was another silk strike in Paterson.

== See also ==
- 1835 Paterson textile strike
- 1902 Paterson silk strike
- New Jersey Digital Highway
- Eight-Hour Leagues

== Sources ==
- Golin, Steve (1988). The Fragile Bridge: Paterson Silk Strike, 1913. Philadelphia]: Temple University Press.
- Tripp, Anne Huber (1987). The I.W.W. and the Paterson Silk Strike of 1913. Chicago: University of Illinois Press.
- Paul, Catherine (2018). "Paterson Silk Strike, 1913." Social Welfare History Project".
