= Peter D. Martin =

American professor and bookstore owner

Peter Dean Martin
- Born: 1923
- Died: March 3, 1988 (aged 65); San Francisco, California, US
- Known for: City Lights Bookstore
- Spouse: Madeleine Martin
- Parent: Carlo Tresca
- Relatives: Elizabeth Gurley Flynn (aunt)

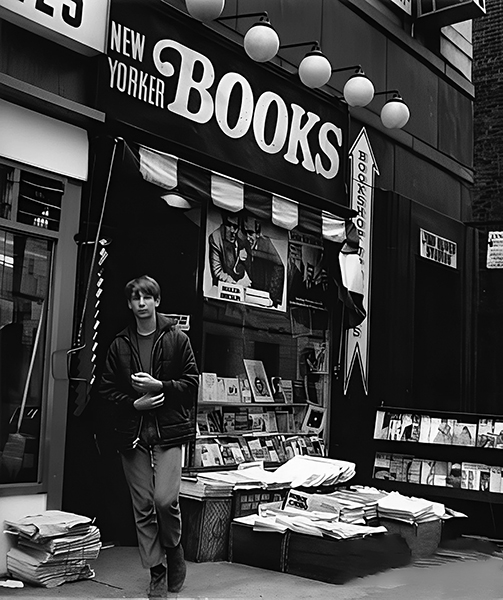
New Yorker Bookshop

Peter Dean Martin (1923 – March 3, 1988) was an American college professor and bookstore owner, known for his founding of the City Lights Bookstore. He was the son of Carlo Tresca and Sabina 'Bina' Flynn, and the nephew of Elizabeth Gurley Flynn.

== Background ==
Martin was teaching sociology at San Francisco State College when in 1953 he founded the short lived City Lights Publishing company. To support the publishing company, he started the City Lights Pocket Book Shop with Lawrence Ferlinghetti.

After two years, he sold his interest in the bookstore and returned to his native New York, where he founded the New Yorker Bookstore with his wife Madeleine Dimond.
