= All the Right Enemies =

1988 book by Dorothy Gallagher

All the Right Enemies: The Life and Murder of Carlo Tresca
- First edition
- Editor: Dorothy Gallagher
- Language: English
- Subject: non-fiction, biography
- Published: 1988 (Rutgers University Press)
- Publication place: United States
- Media type: Print (hardback, paperback)
- Pages: 321
- ISBN: 9780813513102
- OCLC: 17225359

All the Right Enemies: The Life and Murder of Carlo Tresca is a 1988 biography of Italian–American anarchist Carlo Tresca by Dorothy Gallagher.

== Reception ==
The New York Review of Books called All the Right Enemies a "cool, almost laconic, recital", and wrote "it reads like an inspired police report. Yet her restraint serves to enhance the violence and passion of the events she recounts."

All the Right Enemies has also been reviewed by Publishers Weekly, Italian Americana magazine, Kirkus Reviews, Commentary, Dissent, Washington Monthly, The Nation, and The Journal of American History.

It was a 1988 New York Times Notable Book of the Year.
