= Patrick L. Quinlan =

Irish-born American trade unionist

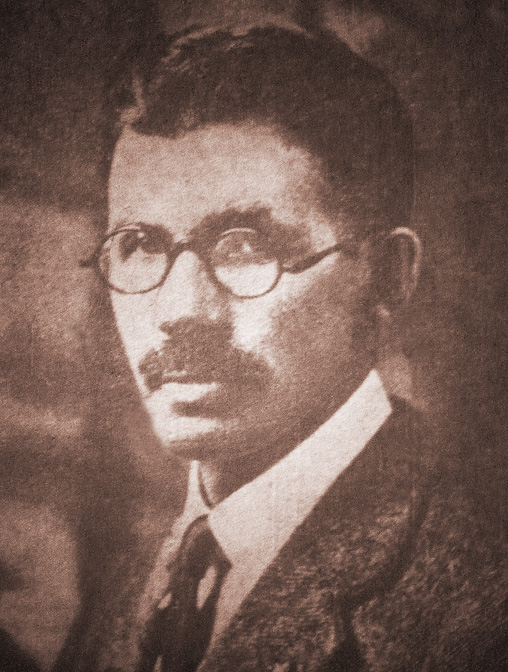
Patrick L. Quinlan as he appeared in September 1921.

Arthur Patrick L. "Pat" Quinlan (1883–1948) was an Irish trade union organizer, journalist, and socialist political activist. Quinlan is best remembered for the part he played as an organizer for the Industrial Workers of the World in the 1913 Paterson silk strike — an event which led to his imprisonment for two years in the New Jersey State Penitentiary.

== Biography ==
=== Early years ===
Arthur Patrick L. Quinlan — known to history as Patrick and to his friends as "Pat" — was born February 23, 1883, in the town of Kilmallock in the southern part of County Limerick, Ireland. He was the son of a farmer and dry goods merchant who emigrated to the United States of America with his family in 1887. Quinlan was sent back to Ireland as a boy with a view to his being educated for the priesthood, and he consequently remained apart from his family in America until his early teens.

He became a member of the Independent Labour Party and, 1900, worked in successful campaign to elect Keir Hardie Member of Parliament for Welsh mining constituency of Merthyr Tydfil.

At the end of 1900, Quinlan returned to the US. There he worked variously as a coal miner, steel worker, teamster, machinist, grocery clerk, sailor, and a longshoreman, among other occupations.

During his time on the New Jersey docks, Quinlan joined the Longshoreman's Protective Association, part of the Socialist Trade and Labor Alliance, the trade union wing of the Socialist Labor Party of America (SLP). This lead Quinlan to membership in the Marxist SLP itself, in which he was a member of Section Newark, New Jersey. During this time he formed a close political association with radical Irish socialist James Connolly — a key leader of the 1916 Easter Uprising who would be executed by the British government in the revolt's aftermath.

In 1907 and 1908 Quinlan worked closely with Connolly on the defense committee working on behalf of persecuted Industrial Workers of the World leaders Bill Haywood, Charles Moyer, and George Pettibone and together they attempted to establish an Irish Socialist Federation inside the SLP. Quinlan was also part of the effort at this time by the New Jersey SLP to broker organizational unity with the rival Socialist Party of America (SPA). When the SLP's dominant leader, party editor Daniel DeLeon took a hostile stance to both an Irish SLP Federation and to organizational unity with the SPA, Quinlan exited the former organization in favor of the latter.

Quinlan was regarded as an effective soapbox orator and formal public speaker, a person capable of winning audiences over with a sarcastic and intense delivery style. In 1910 this ability was put to use by the Socialist Party in a professional capacity when Quinlan was enlisted as a paid organizer for the party for the states of Pennsylvania, Massachusetts, and New York.

=== 1913 Paterson silk strike ===
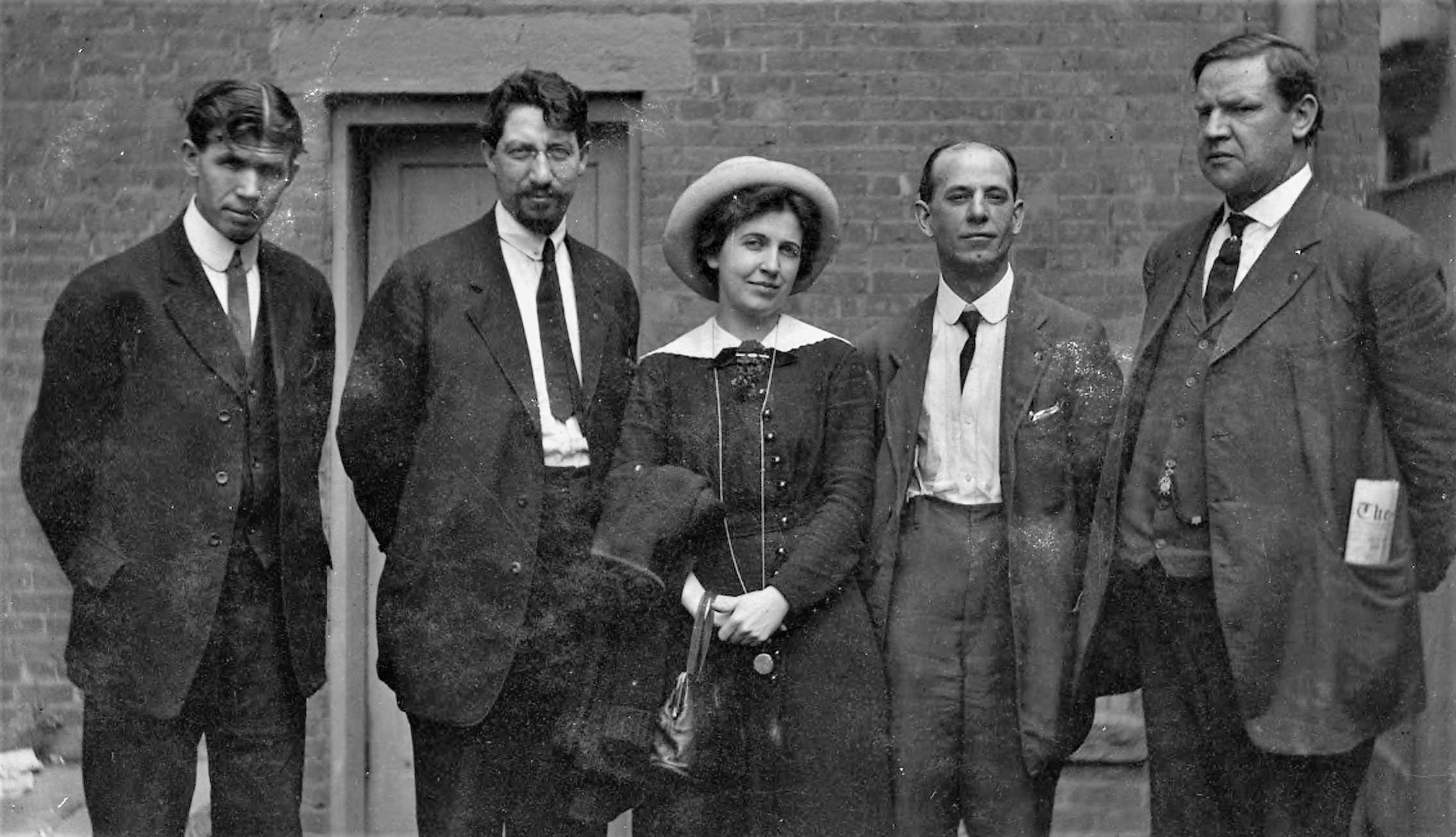
1913 Paterson Silk Strike leaders Patrick L. Quinlan, Carlo Tresca, Elizabeth Gurley Flynn, Adolph Lessig, and Big Bill Haywood.

In 1912 Quinlan was named as a traveling organizer for the Industrial Workers of the World (IWW). It was in this capacity that he became involved in one of that organization's most highly publicized actions, a massive strike of silk workers in Paterson, New Jersey, in 1913.

The strike began on the morning of Tuesday, February 25, 1913. In accordance with a prearranged plan, at 8 am between 4,000 and 5,000 Paterson mill workers simultaneously walked off the job, forming an informal parade to Paterson's Turn Hall, where a mass meeting was scheduled. Along with IWW organizers Carlo Tresca and Elizabeth Gurley Flynn, Quinlan was slated to address the 2,000 or so workers who managed to make their way to this event.

This gathering was interrupted by Paterson chief of police John Bimson, who ordered the meeting to disperse and arrested the three IWW organizers. The trio were offered the chance to avoid prosecution by immediately leaving the city — a choice which was declined. Despite the peaceful nature of the strike meeting, Quinlan, Flynn, and Tresca were consequently charged with inciting a riot and held on $1,000 bail. After spending a night in jail, Quinlan was released on bail and returned to his strike organizing activities.

The Paterson strike was long, costly, and bitter and the "outside agitators" of the IWW were particularly targeted by law enforcement authorities and mill owners looking to break the strikers. On April 25, 1913, a grand jury returned an indictment against Quinlan and four other top IWW leaders, a charge related to Quinlan's speech at Turn Hall on the first day of the strike. Formal charges against Quinlan included inciting personal injury, inciting assault, and advocating burning and destruction. Quinlan was arrested again and a new bail of $7,000 was established. Quinlan was arraigned along with Big Bill Haywood, Elizabeth Gurley Flynn, Carlo Tresca, and Adolph Lessig on Wednesday, April 30.

Quinlan was selected by authorities to go to trial first on the basis of a perceived likelihood of his conviction. On May 7, 1913, Quinlan's trial began, with a large crowd assembling outside the Passaic County Courthouse in Paterson to cheer Quinlan and other IWW leaders and boo the police "in a manner not unlike a sports event." Jury selection occupied the morning and the trial commenced in an afternoon session. Seven witnesses, headed by a police detective sergeant, gave testimony that Quinlan had told the assembled strikers at Turn Hall to leave their jobs "by any means necessary." In his own defense, confirmed by other witnesses, Quinlan indicated that he had not addressed the gathering at all, arriving only after police had broken up the meeting.

Summations took place on May 9, with Quinlan's attorney declaring the case to be "a police frame-up, pure and simple." County Prosecutor Michael Dunn, on the other hand, likened Quinlan to the McNamara Brothers, convicted of a fatal bombing in connection with a Los Angeles iron workers' strike.

Quinlan's case ended in a mistrial, with the jury hopelessly deadlocked with 7 in favor of acquittal and 5 voting to convict. The mistrial did not result in Quinlan's freedom, however, and just two days after the conclusion of the first trial a second trial against Quinlan was begun.

A jury was hastily selected for the second Quinlan trial, with the selection process completed in less than an hour. The same exact case was presented by the prosecution, while the defense bolstered its case with a New York clergyman and prominent lawyer testifying to Quinlan's good character, as well as a local journalist who swore that Quinlan had not spoken at the February 25 meeting in question at Turn Hall. Nevertheless, in the retrial Quinlan was found guilty as charged by the speedily-picked jury after just two hours of deliberations.

No Paterson newspaper criticized the dubious Quinlan verdict, which was further applauded editorially by the Nation magazine and the New York Times.

On Thursday, July 3, 1913, with cases against the other IWW defendants at last concluded, Quinlan went before Judge Abram Klenert for sentencing. Klenert sentenced Quinlan to 2 to 7 years in Trenton State Prison and fined him $500 on the basis of his conviction. No release pending appeal was allowed and the following Monday Quinlan was taken to Trenton to begin serving what would be two years behind bars.

=== After prison ===
Upon his release, Quinlan's complaints about the dire conditions associated with the state's penitentiary system were instrumental in causing an investigative commission to be established. This commission brought about some modest reform of the system, including the abolition of the contract labor system in which prisoners would be rented out as virtual slaves to private capitalists.

The defeat of the 1913 Paterson strike moved Quinlan back into the camp believing in the necessity of political action, bringing him into conflict with leaders of the IWW. The strike's loss effectively ended a period of close cooperation between the Wobblies and the Socialist Party and upon reaching that fork in the road, Quinlan chose to chart his course with the latter.

Active in the Socialist Party of New Jersey, state affiliate of the SPA, Quinlan was elected a delegate to the SPA's 1917 Emergency National Convention, a gathering in St. Louis which established the party's opposition to American participation in World War I, and to the 1919 Emergency National Convention which saw the formal split of the party into Socialist and Communist wings.

Quinlan was also a member of the International Longshoremen's Association from 1917 to 1919. He returned to turbulent Europe in the fall of 1919, spending the next two years visiting Northern and Central Europe as well as Soviet Russia.

In 1920 he attended an International Congress of Transportation Workers in Christiania (Oslo), Norway.

Quinlan proceeded to Soviet Russia, where he attended the 2nd World Congress of the Communist International. Quinlan was afforded status as a voting delegate at that gathering, representing the Labour Party of Ireland.

Quinlan returned to America in 1921, moving to Buffalo, New York, to assume the editorship of the Socialist Party newspaper there, The New Age. He remained in this capacity until 1923. Among the new features appearing in the paper after Quinlan's assumption of the editorship around the first of October 1921 was a recurring editorial page section containing brief, pithy, politically charged barbs, entitled "Small Shot, by Patsy O'Bang."

=== Later years ===
By 1941, Quinlan had become editor of the Gaelic American, a weekly publication associated with the Sinn Féin. In this capacity Quinlan was supportive of the activities of the American Committee for Protection of Foreign Born, a mass organization of the American Communist Party.

=== Death and legacy ===
Patrick Quinlan died in 1948.

== Works ==
- "The Paterson Strike," Solidarity [New Castle, PA], vol. 4, no. 12, whole no. 168 (March 15, 1913), pg. 1.
- "The Paterson Strike and After," The New Review [New York], vol. 2, no. 1 (January 1914), pp. 26–33.
- "Statements of Patrick L. Quinlan on the Fate of the IWW (1917)." Published in Percy Stickney Grant, Fair Play for the Workers: Some Sides of their Maladjustment and the Causes. New York: Moffat, Yard and Co., 1918; pp. 280–284.
- "Zukor, Communist Traitor of Brooklyn Dissected: His Charges Refuted," The New Age [Buffalo], vol. 10, whole no. 474 (Sept. 29, 1921), pg. 6.
- "Irish-English Peace: The Free State Analysed," The New Age [Buffalo], vol. 10, whole no. 486 (Dec. 15, 1921), pg. 1.
- "James Connolly: Irish Republican Leader and International Socialist," The New Age [Buffalo, NY], vol. 10, whole no. 492 (Jan. 26, 1922), pg. 7.
