= New Jersey State Library =

Library in Trenton, New Jersey, US

Coordinates: 40.2210°N 74.7723°W

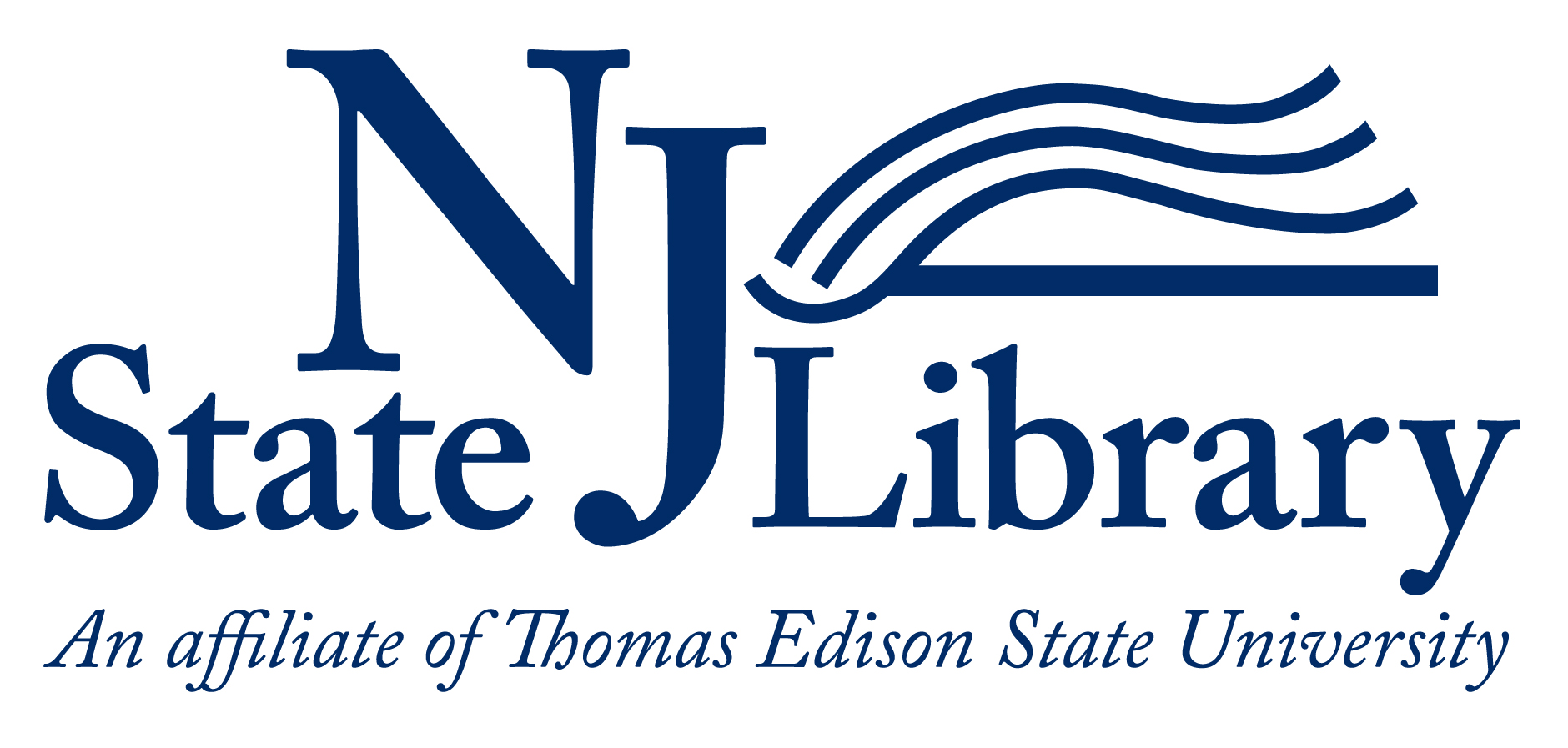

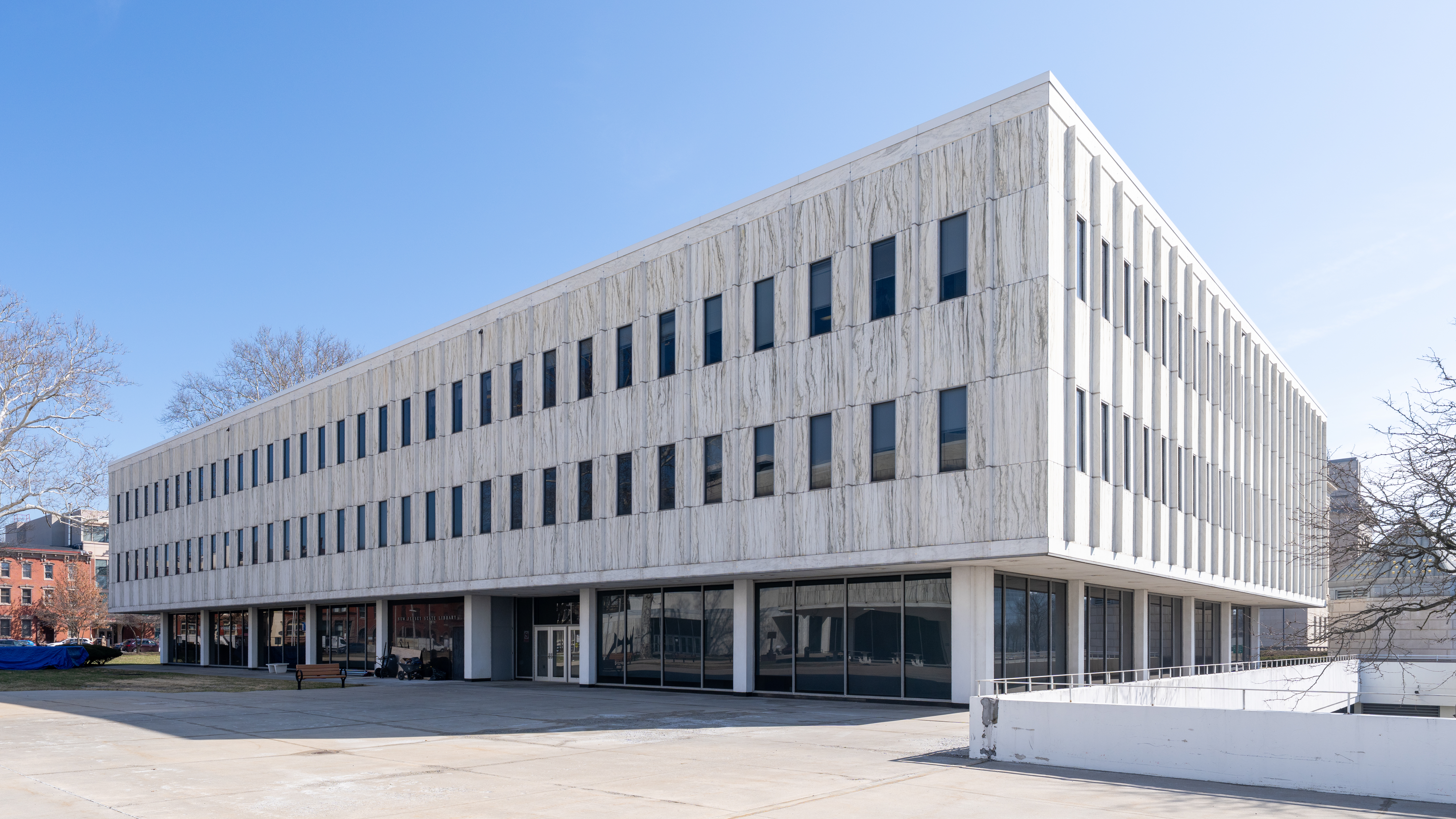
- Location: Trenton, New Jersey, United States
- Type: Public
- Established: 1796

Other information
- Website: www.njstatelib.org

The New Jersey State Library, based in Trenton, New Jersey, was established in 1796 to serve the information needs of New Jersey's Governor, Legislature and Judiciary. The State Library is also responsible to assist in the provision of library and information services to all New Jersey residents. The State Library is an affiliate of Thomas Edison State University and is located in the Capitol Complex in Trenton.

== History ==
Although scholars debate the New Jersey State Library's founding date, the collection began almost a century earlier. Between 1664 and 1702, New Jersey existed as two propriety colonies – East New Jersey and West New Jersey – with all governing documents in manuscript form. In 1704, two years after becoming the Royal Colony of New Jersey, William Bradford began printing laws for the colony. This included An Act to Regulate the Purchasing of Law from the Indians, the first printed law in New Jersey, and a collection of laws passed between 1703 and 1709. In 1711, the assembly began consistently printing its laws and minutes and, by 1725, the “pages of Votes & Proceedings,” the colonial legislative publication, “were being sent to the printer weekly.”

In 1742, the assembly began actively purchasing books and reference materials for the legislative collection, with their minutes referring to them as “books belonging ‘to the Colony of New Jersey.’” By the 1750s, committee reports listed the sources used in each deliberation, which included several reference texts, such as law dictionaries, encyclopedias, and handbooks on parliamentary procedure. In the 1760s, there are several mentions of the assembly ordering boxes, shelving, and cases for their growing collection. The boxes and cases also enabled the assembly to safely transfer necessary documents and books between Perth Amboy and Burlington, the colony’s two capitals. In 1792, after Trenton was selected as the official capital, the collection received a permanent home, though, according to John T. Shaw, the “collection saw periods of neglect until the position of state librarian was created by the legislature in 1822.” According to John Shaw "By 1873 the collection consisted of over 18,000 volumes and the library was well on its way to becoming the great research institution that it is today."

== Activities ==
The State Librarian serves as a representative to the office of the Governor of New Jersey, the New Jersey State Legislature, the various New Jersey state agencies, and other statewide organizations. The current State Librarian is Jennifer R. Nelson.

The State Library Information Center provides resources and services to employees of the Government of New Jersey as well as to employees and students of Thomas Edison State University. Those same resources and services are available, through the Library Network, to residents throughout New Jersey.

Other significant departments and activities within the State Library include the New Jersey State Library Talking Book & Braille Center, founded in 1967; the JerseyConnect infrastructure backbone and service capability; the Lifelong Learning unit; the Innovation & Strategic Partnerships unit; the Library Support Services unit; and the Office of Communication, Marketing & Outreach.

== See also ==
- New Jersey Library Association
- New Jersey State Museum
- Thomas Edison State University
- List of libraries in the United States
