= Elizabeth Gurley Flynn =

American labor leader and feminist (1890–1964)

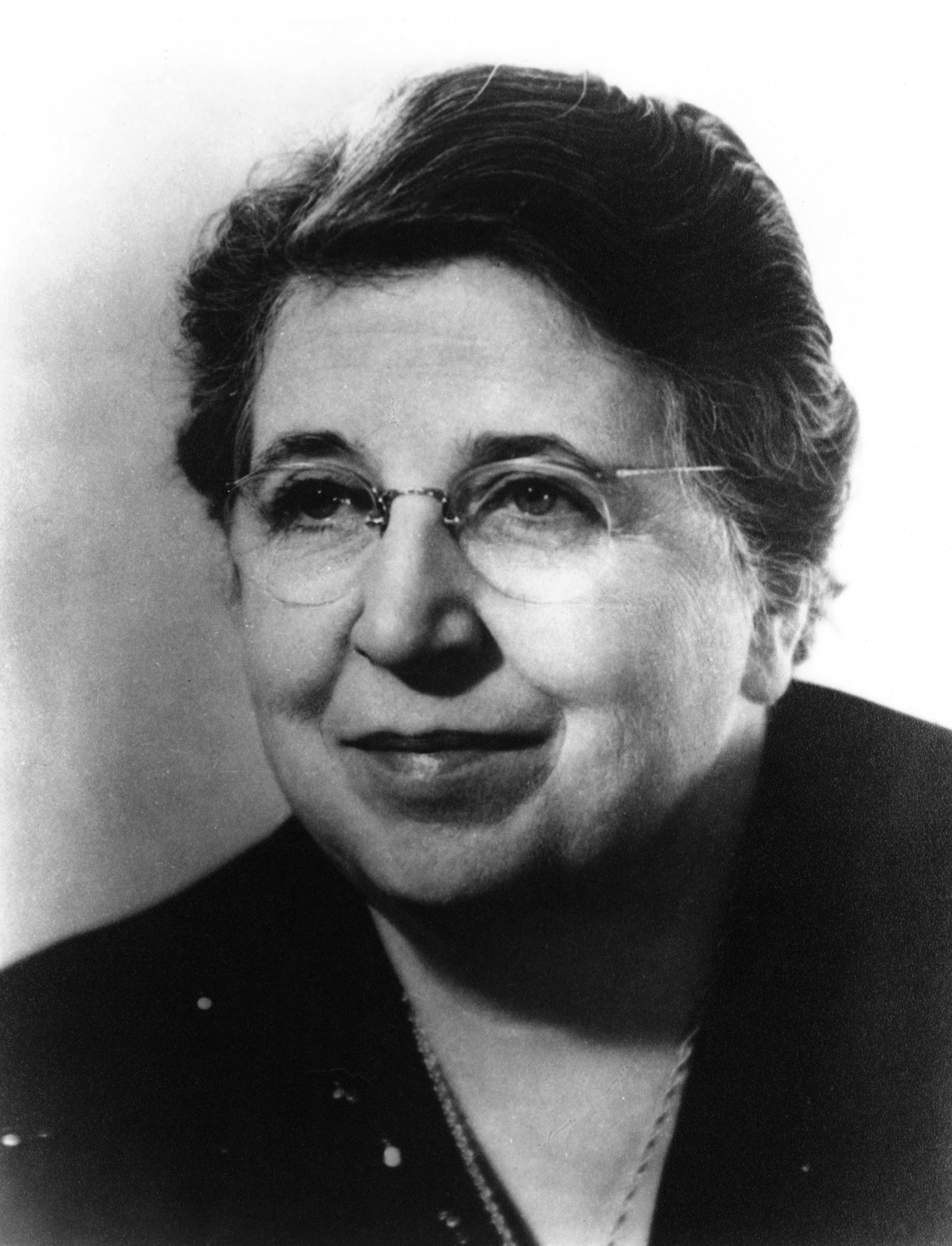
- Flynn c. 1948

Chairwoman of the National Committee of the Communist Party USA
- In office January 31, 1961 – September 5, 1964
- Preceded by: Eugene Dennis
- Succeeded by: Henry Winston

Personal details
- Born: August 7, 1890 Concord, New Hampshire, U.S.
- Died: September 5, 1964 (aged 74) Moscow, Russian SFSR, Soviet Union
- Resting place: Waldheim Cemetery, Chicago
- Party: Communist Party USA (1936–1964)
- Other political affiliations: Industrial Workers of the World; American Civil Liberties Union
- Relations: Carlo Tresca (brother-in-law); Peter D. Martin (nephew)
- Occupation: Labor leader, activist

Elizabeth Gurley Flynn (August 7, 1890 – September 5, 1964) was an American labor leader and feminist. In the early years of her activist career, she was an organizer for the Industrial Workers of the World (known also as the IWW or the Wobblies). During World War I she founded the Workers Defense Union (WDU), to advocate for anyone arrested and imprisoned for violating the Espionage Act while championing the cause of labor. In 1920, Flynn helped found the American Civil Liberties Union. She joined the Communist Party USA in 1936 during the Popular Front period and became one of its most recognized and beloved leaders.

In 1940, in a highly controversial move, the ACLU expelled her from its executive committee because she was a Communist, despite her reputation as a longtime advocate of free speech. She was elected the first woman chair of the Party in 1961. After her passport was revoked because of her Party membership, she appealed successfully for its reinstatement. She died during a visit to the Soviet Union, where she was accorded a state funeral with processions in Red Square attended by more than 25,000 people.

== Background ==
Elizabeth Gurley Flynn was born on August 7, 1890, in Concord, New Hampshire, the daughter of Annie (Gurley) and Thomas Flynn. The family moved in 1900 to the Bronx, New York, where she was educated at the local public schools. She was a bright student and a talented debater, winning a silver medal for her argumentative prowess. Her parents inspired her with stories about the Irish freedom struggle and introduced her to socialism. When she was only 15 years old, she gave her first public speech, "What Socialism Will Do for Women", at the Harlem Socialist Club. After this, she felt compelled to speak out for social change. She left Morris High School before graduation, a decision she later regretted. However, other sources state that she was expelled from high school due to her political involvement.

== Career ==
=== Industrial Workers of the World ===
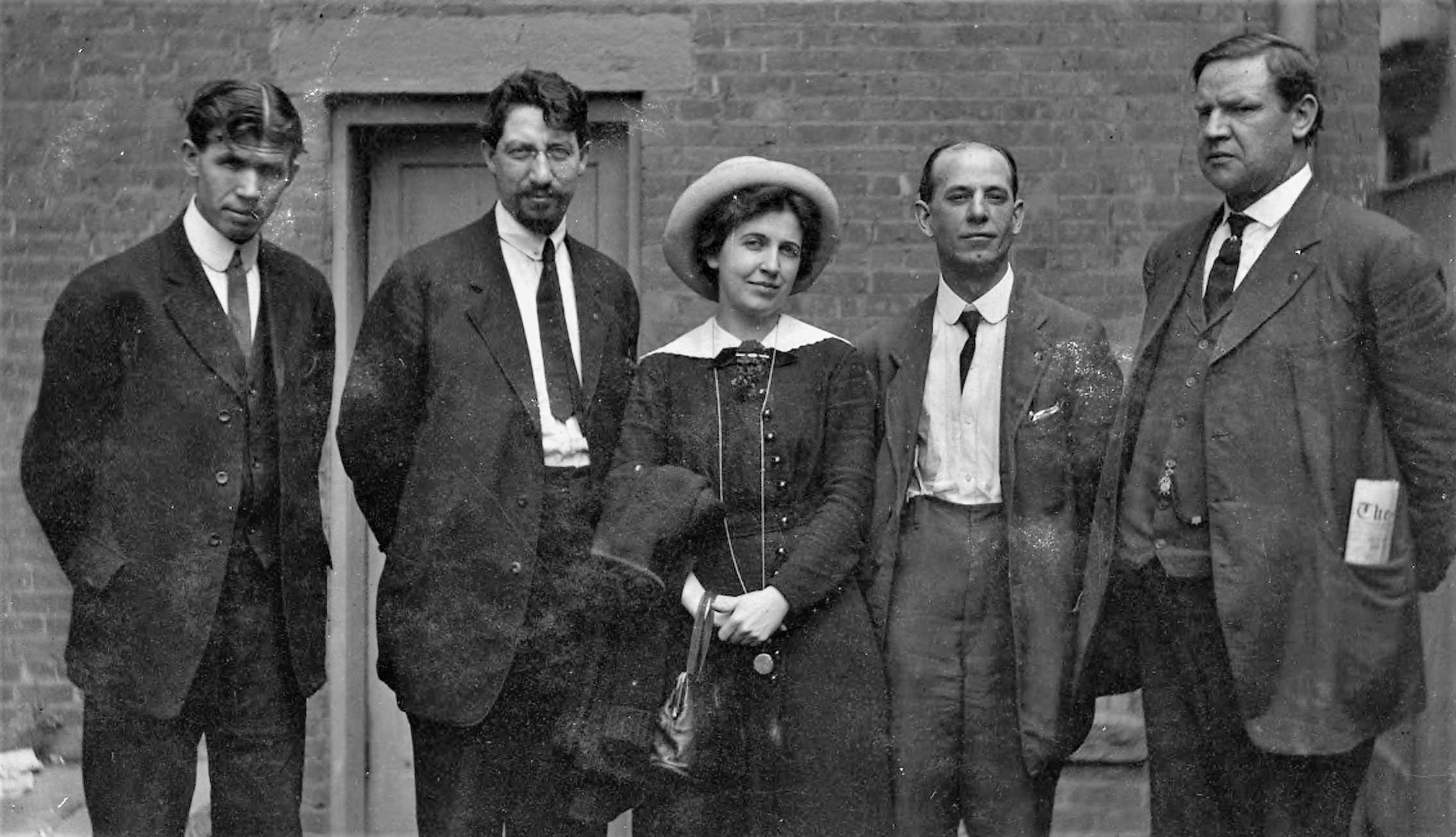
1913 photo of Paterson silk strike leaders Patrick Quinlan, Carlo Tresca, Elizabeth Gurley Flynn, Adolph Lessig, and Bill Haywood

Flynn delivered her first soapbox speech for socialism in New York City in the summer of 1906. She was immediately arrested. Not long after that incident, she joined the Industrial Workers of the World (IWW; also known as the "Wobblies").

In 1907, Flynn became a full-time IWW organizer. She attended her first IWW convention in September of that year. Over the next few years, she organized campaigns among garment workers in Pennsylvania, silk weavers in New Jersey, restaurant workers in New York, miners in Minnesota, Missoula, Montana, and Spokane, Washington; and textile workers in Massachusetts. During this period, author Theodore Dreiser described her as the "East Side Joan of Arc". She was widely recognized for her youth, beauty, speaking ability, intelligence, and wit.

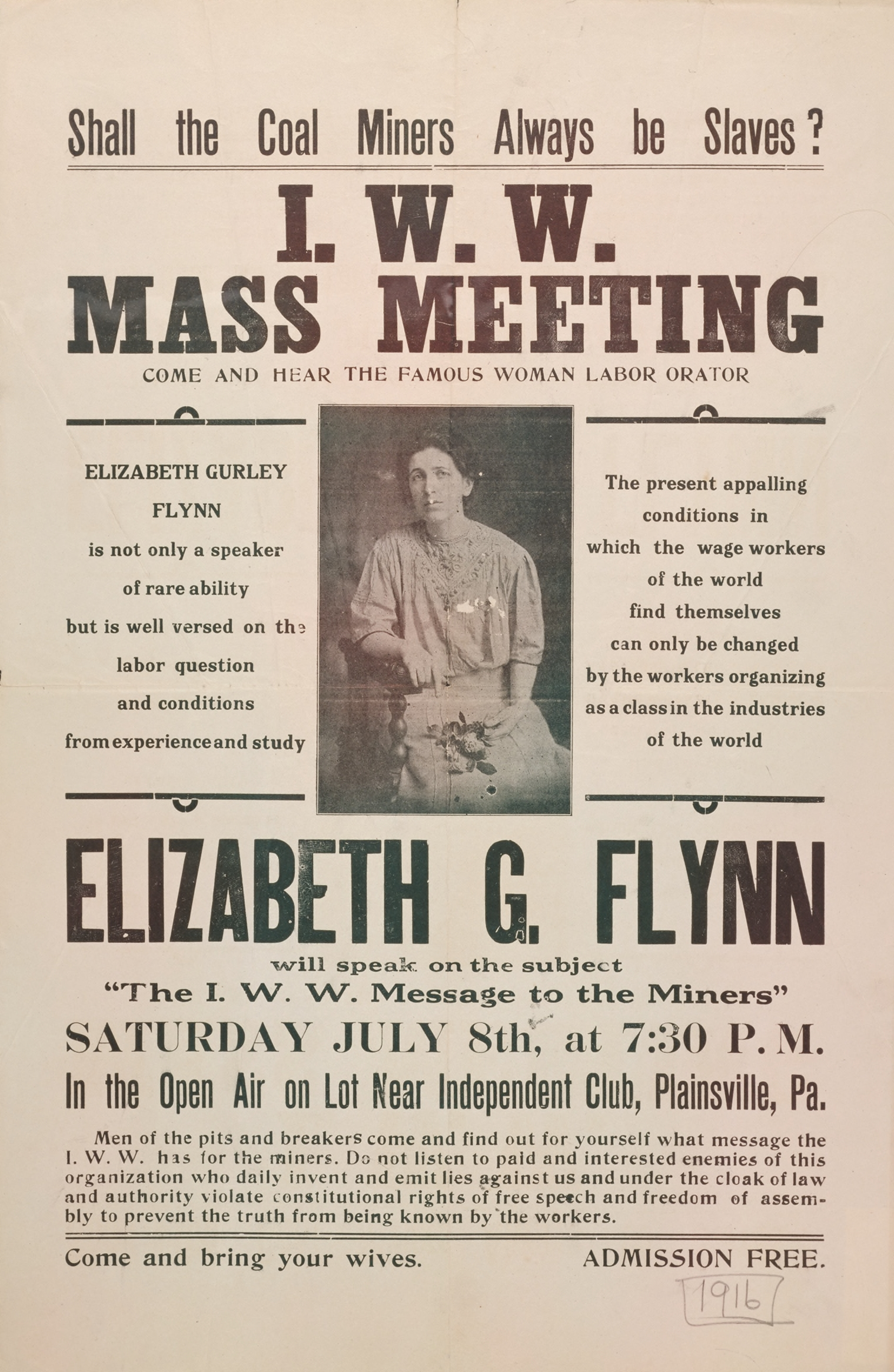
Poster for an IWW mass meeting featuring Flynn, 1916

During one of her IWW speaking engagements Flynn met James Connolly, fellow Wobbly and revolutionary leader of the movement for Irish independence from England. She and Connolly became good friends and she worked with him, Patrick Quinlan, and other Irish Americans to establish the Irish Socialist Federation of New York. The federation aimed to assist working-class Irish in their revolutionary struggles, to educate Irish Americans about socialism, and to encourage working-class solidarity across racial, ethnic, and national lines for the emancipation of workers everywhere. Flynn championed Connolly's idea of a free and independent workers republic in Ireland throughout her life. She also befriended and worked with other Irish freedom fighters, including James Larkin and Hanna Sheehy-Skeffington.

In 1909, Flynn played a leading role in free speech fights in Missoula, MT, and Spokane, WA. The Missoula free speech fight ended in victory for Flynn and the IWW in October 1909. During the Spokane free speech fight, Flynn was arrested and imprisoned. She accused the police of using the jail as a brothel, which resulted in the city hiring a female prison matron. Flynn's allegation prompted Spokane city officials to try to confiscate all copies of the Industrial Worker reporting the charge. On March 4, 1910, Spokane relented, giving the IWW the right to hold speech meetings and letting all IWW protestors free.

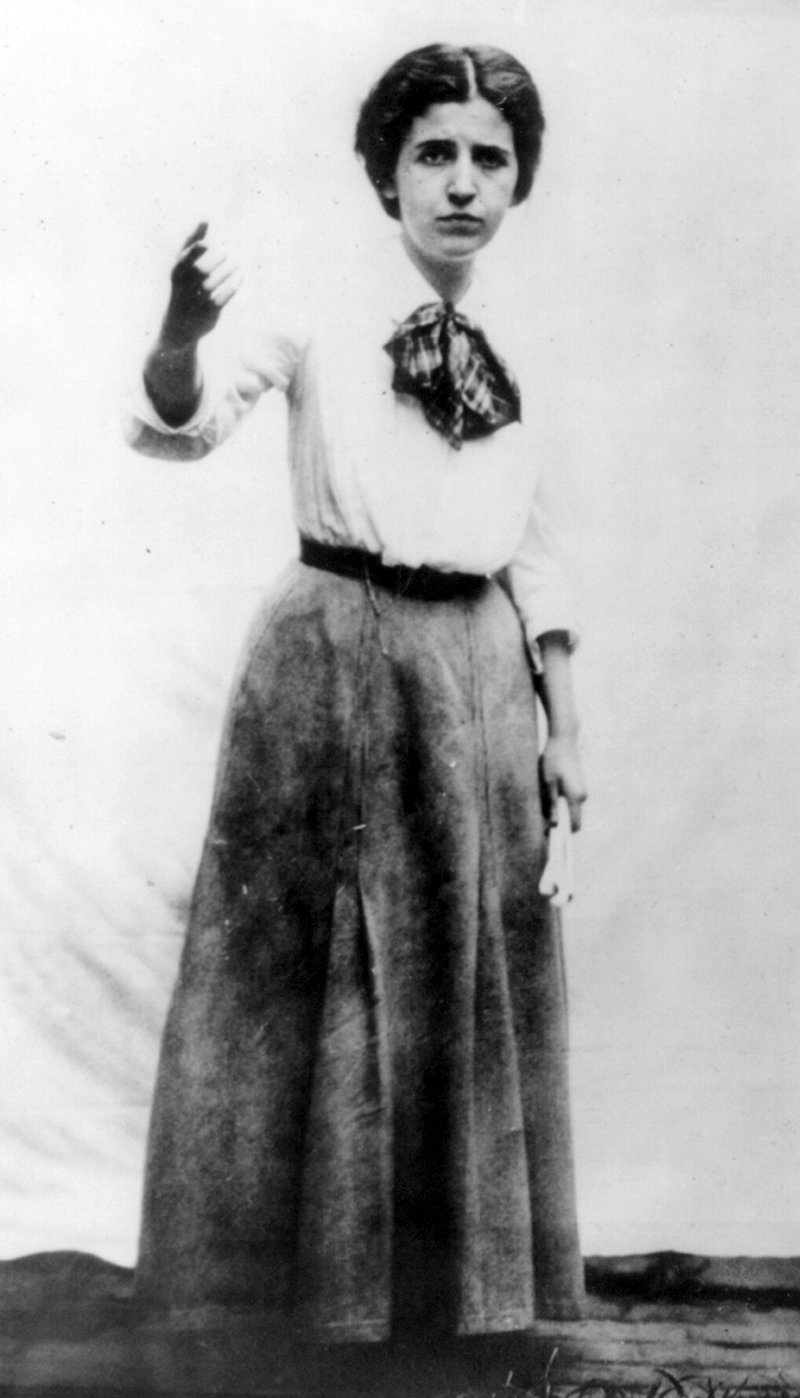
Flynn c. 1910s

During a cross-country speaking tour in spring of 1915, Flynn met with songwriter Joe Hill in the Salt Lake City County Jail, where he was awaiting the Utah Supreme Court to hear his case. Her account of the meeting, published in the May 22, 1915 issue of the Solidarity newspaper, was considered "a significant milestone in the IWW's support of Hill". Over the next several months, she and Hill had an active correspondence. He wrote and dedicated "The Rebel Girl" to her. On November 11, 1915, she managed to meet with President Woodrow Wilson in the White House to plead for clemency on Hill's behalf, but it was to no avail and he was executed eight days later.

Throughout her years of IWW activism, Flynn was arrested on ten occasions, but was never convicted of a crime. Disagreement with William D. Haywood over the structure of the IWW, and over the plea bargain that she and Joseph Ettor had arranged to secure the release of fellow Wobbly organizer Carlo Tresca (who was jailed during the Mesabi Range strike), led Flynn to break with the Wobblies in 1916. After she left the IWW, she continued to exhort workers, especially Black workers, to join the union.

=== Workers' Defense Union ===
Flynn organized the Workers' Defense Union in November 1918. An umbrella organization comprising trade unionists, socialists, syndicalists, anarchists, and communists, the WDU was not sectarian and did not discriminate on the basis of race or gender. It provided assistance with legal defense and publicity for labor activists arrested under the Espionage Act and advocated (unsuccessfully) for political prisoner status for those imprisoned for their labor activism. The WDU also provided material aid to immigrant radicals facing deportation and supported anticolonial movements in India, Mexico, and Ireland.

=== American Civil Liberties Union ===
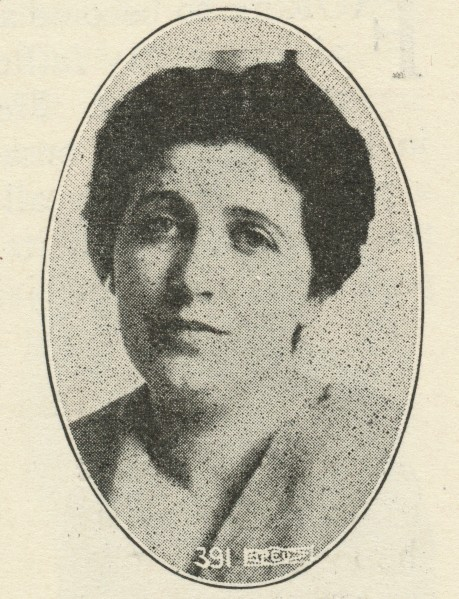
Flynn c. 1922

Flynn was among those who founded the American Civil Liberties Union (ACLU) in 1920. She played a leading role in the campaign against the conviction of Sacco and Vanzetti. Although her primary loyalty was to the labor movement, Flynn was also concerned with women's rights, supporting birth control. Flynn also criticized the leadership of trade unions for being male-dominated and not reflecting the needs of women.

In 1926, while she was actively involved in the defense campaign for Sacco and Vanzetti, Flynn was taken seriously ill while on a speaking trip on the West Coast. Between 1926 and 1936, she took a leave of absence from public life and recuperated in southwest Portland, Oregon, with birth control activist and suffragette Marie Equi. Despite her poor health, Flynn was a vocal supporter of the 1934 West Coast Longshore Strike.

=== International Labor Defense ===
From 1927 to 1930, Flynn chaired the International Labor Defense (ILD), a legal advocacy organization (like the Workers Defense Union), founded by the Communist Party. She resigned from the chair position because of ill health.

=== Communist Party USA ===
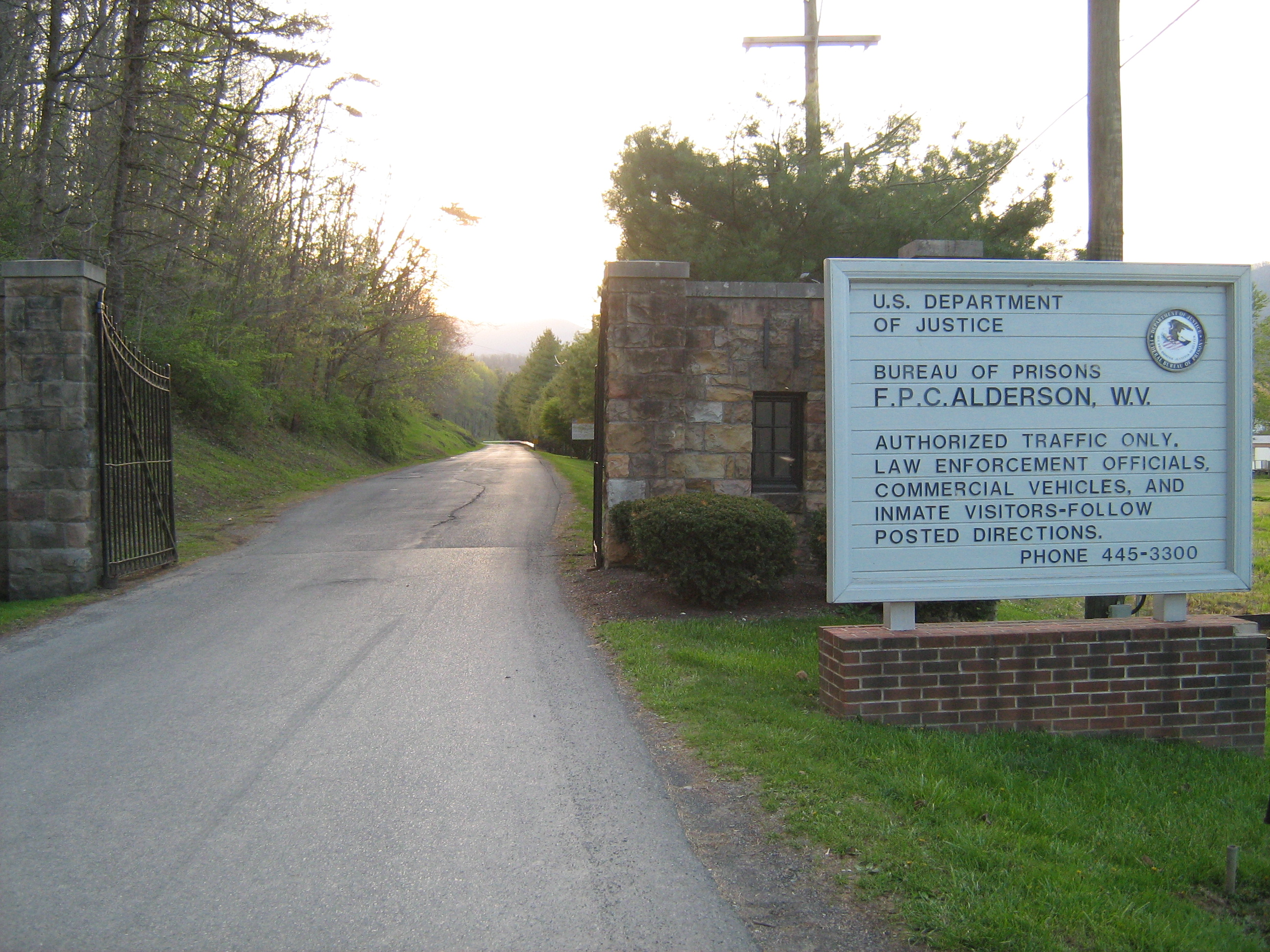
Federal Prison Camp, Alderson, where Flynn was incarcerated

In 1937, Flynn joined Communist Party USA (CPUSA). She wrote a weekly column for its newspaper, the Daily Worker and was an outspoken supporter of labor organizing drives by the CIO(Congress of Industrial Organizations), and a critic of fascist regimes in Italy, Spain, and Germany, as well as increasing political intolerance in the United States. As a Communist, Flynn spoke out against lynching, the poll tax, job discrimination, housing discrimination, and other forms of oppression and discrimination directed against Black Americans. She became close friends with Claudia Jones, a Black Communist, and that relationship gave her a more nuanced understanding of the "triple oppression" that shaped working-class Black women's lives.

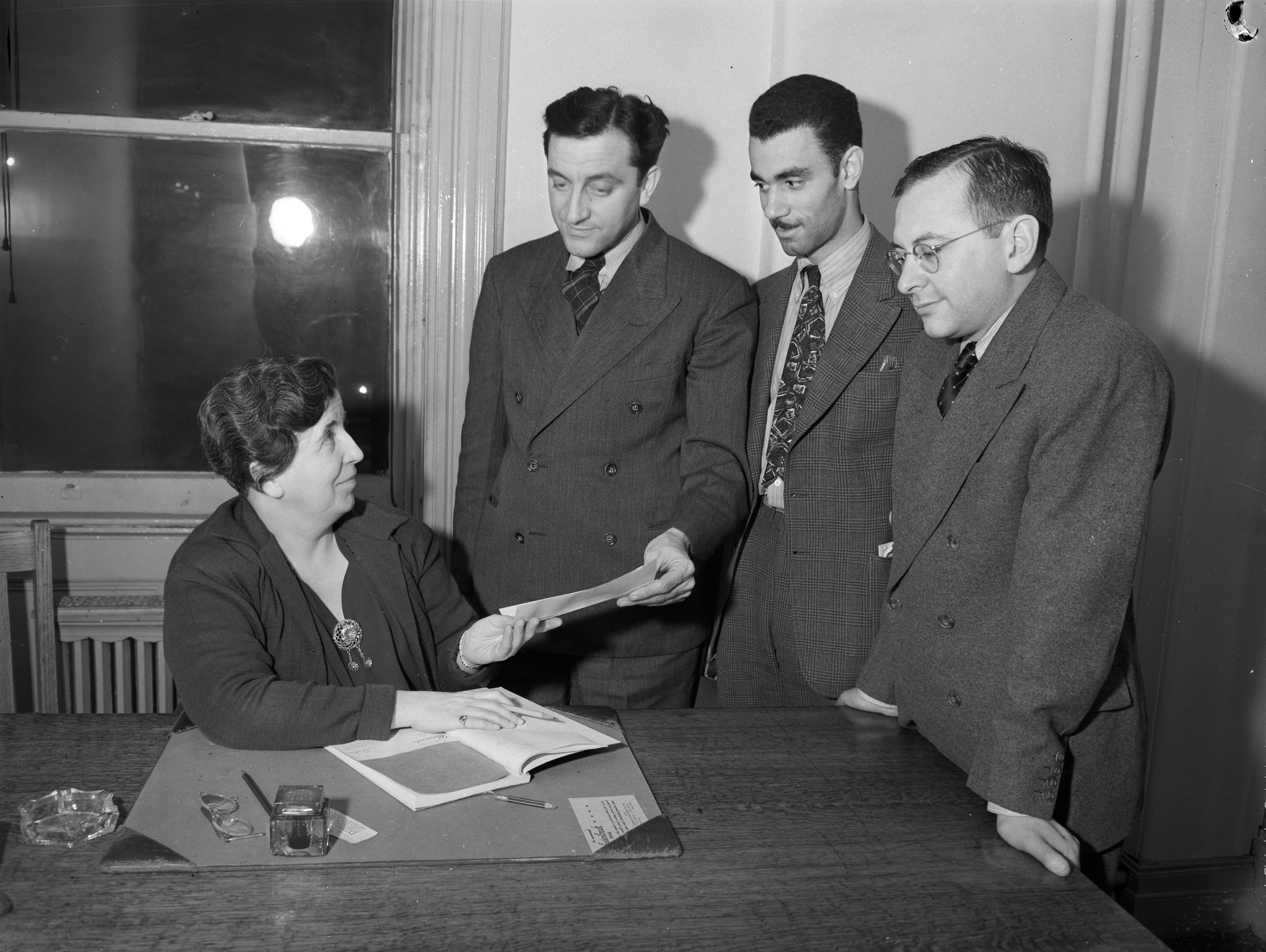
Members of the Young Communist League present Flynn with a thousand-dollar check to be used for the legal defense of Earl Browder, November 1939

In 1939, Flynn was re-elected to the executive board of the ACLU. After the signing of the Nazi-Soviet Pact in August 1939, the ACLU drafted a controversial resolution equating Nazism with Communism and barring Nazis and Communists from holding office in the organization. As Flynn was the only open Communist on the board at the time, the resolution was widely viewed as targeting her for expulsion to protect the reputation of the ACLU. After a "trial", the board voted to expel her, an act that some view as providing a seal of approval for the persecution of Communists. Later in 1976, the ACLU issued a posthumous reversal of their decision to expel her.

During World War II, Flynn actively recruited support for the fight against fascism abroad and played an important role in the campaign for equal economic opportunity and pay for women and the establishment of day care centers for working mothers in the US. In 1942, she ran for Congress at-large in New York and received 50,000 votes. In July 1948, a dozen leaders of the Communist Party were arrested and accused of violating the Smith Act by advocating the overthrow of the US government by force and violence. Flynn chaired their defense committee, raising tens of thousands of dollars for bail, legal fees, and publicity. After the defendants were convicted in the Foley Square trial they appealed to the Supreme Court, which upheld their conviction in Dennis v. United States; two justices wrote in dissent that they were convicted in violation of their Constitutional rights for engaging in activities protected by the First Amendment.

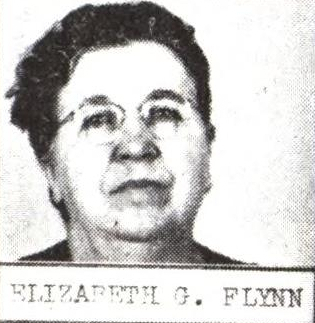
Flynn's FBI mugshot, 1951

In June 1951, Flynn was herself arrested in the second wave of arrests and prosecuted under the Smith Act with sixteen other Communist Party members. They were accused of conspiring to "teach and advocate violent overthrow" of the government. After a nine-month trial, she and her co-defendants were found guilty. Flynn was sentenced to three years in Federal Prison Camp, Alderson near Alderson, West Virginia. She later wrote a prison memoir, The Alderson Story: My Life as a Political Prisoner.

After her release from prison, Flynn continued to fight for free speech and the right of Americans to hold political views without persecution. She ran for the New York City Council as a Communist in 1957, garnering a total of 710 votes.

In 1961, Flynn became the first national chairwoman of CPUSA. A year later, her passport was revoked under Section 6 of the McCarran Act, which made it illegal for any member of the Communist Party to apply for, use, or attempt to use a passport. Flynn appealed the decision. Throughout the appeals process she spoke and wrote articles in defense of the right to travel. In 1963, she and Herbert Aptheker, whose passport had also been revoked, had their case heard by the Supreme Court. The court decided in their favor, ruling that Section 6 deprived an individual of liberty without due process of the law in violation of the Fifth Amendment.

== Personal life and death ==
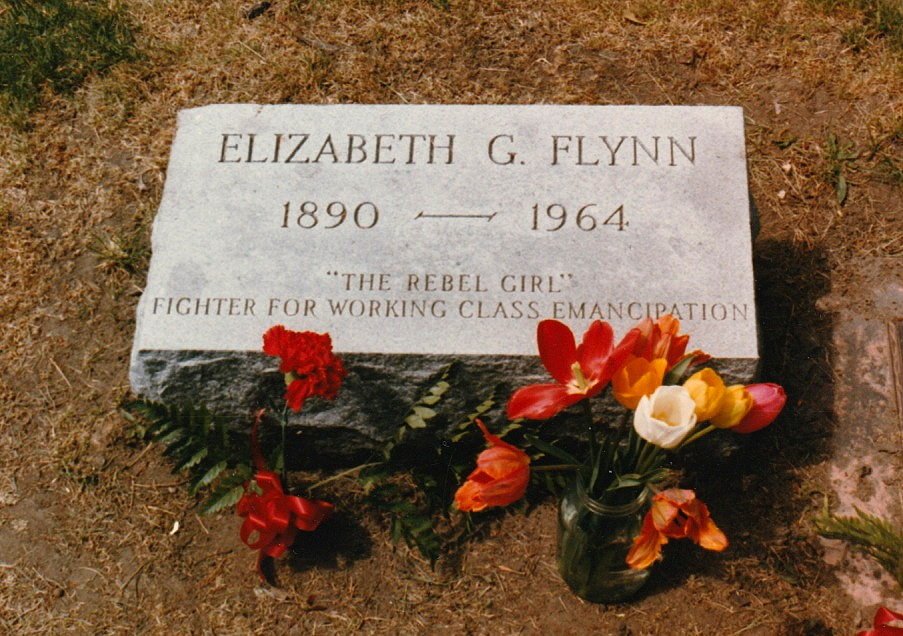
Gravestone of Elizabeth Gurley Flynn

In 1907, Flynn met a Minnesota local organizer for the Industrial Workers of the World, J. A. Jones. He was 16 years older than she, but Flynn stated in her autobiography: "I fell in love with him and we were married in January 1908." The union produced two sons, John Vincent who died a few days after birth, and Fred Flynn, born May 19, 1910 (he died in 1940).

During the 1912 Bread and Roses strike in Lawrence, Massachusetts, Flynn fell in love with Italian anarchist Carlo Tresca. Tresca left his wife and daughter to move in with Flynn and her family. The couple remained together for over a decade, until she learned that Tresca had had an affair with her younger sister, Sabina (Bina), while they were all living together. The affair, which broke Flynn's heart, resulted in a child, Peter D. Martin. Flynn eventually reconciled with Bina and developed a relationship with her nephew.

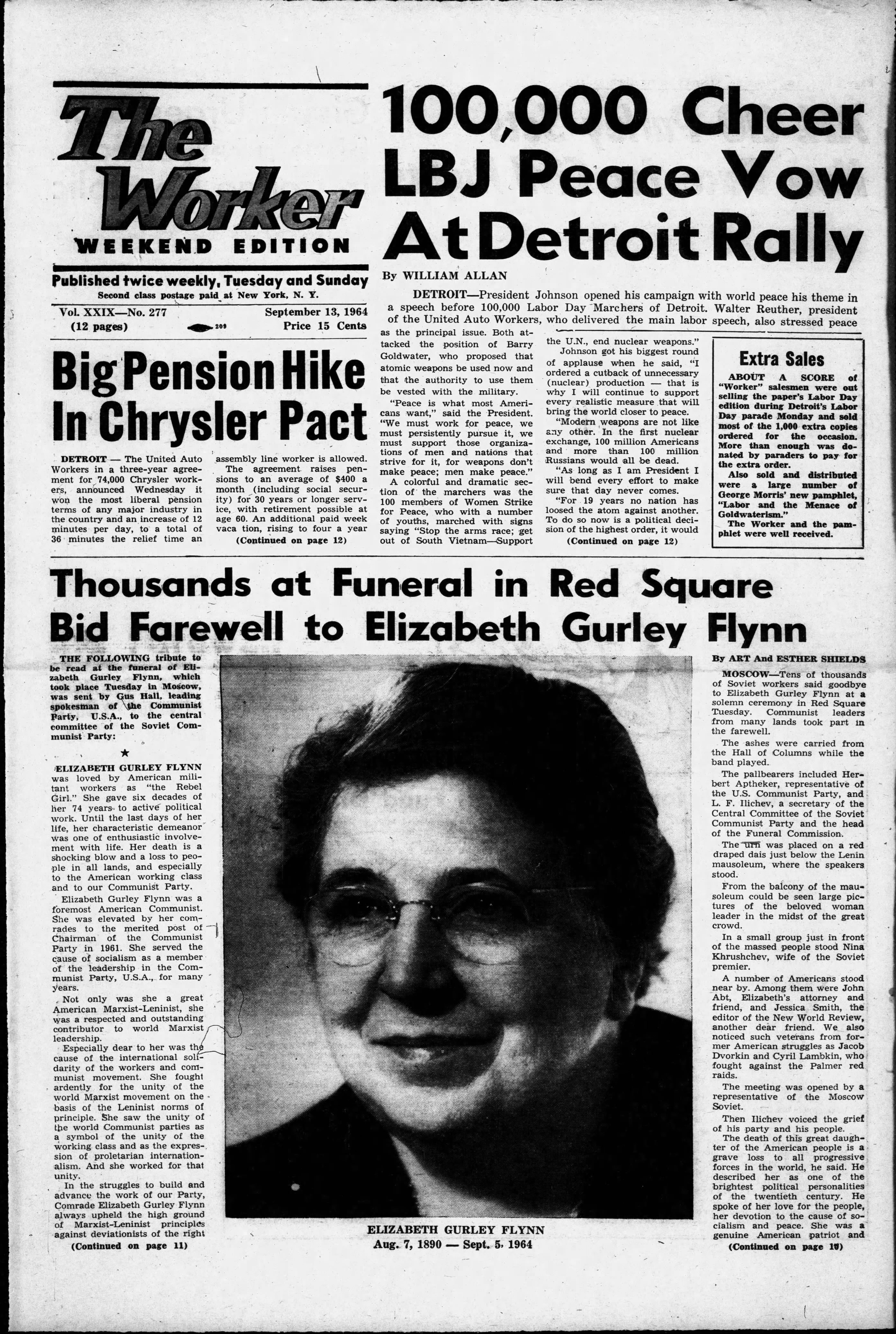
Front page of The Worker shortly after Flynn's death, September 13, 1964

Flynn spent around a decade, from 1926-1936, living together with Dr. Marie Equi, who was an open lesbian. For this reason, Flynn's sexuality has been a topic that has been speculated upon, with some believing she could have been a bisexual or lesbian. However, because of its closed nature, while it's clear they had a close trusted relationship, taking care of each other in times of sickness, their exact relationship and Flynn's sexuality can only be speculated on.

Flynn died in the Soviet Union on September 5, 1964, aged 74.

The Soviet government gave Flynn a state funeral in Red Square with more than 25,000 people attending. In accordance with her wishes, Flynn's remains were flown to the United States for burial in Chicago's Waldheim Cemetery, near the graves of Eugene Dennis, Bill Haywood, Emma Goldman, and the Haymarket Riot Martyrs.

== Legacy ==
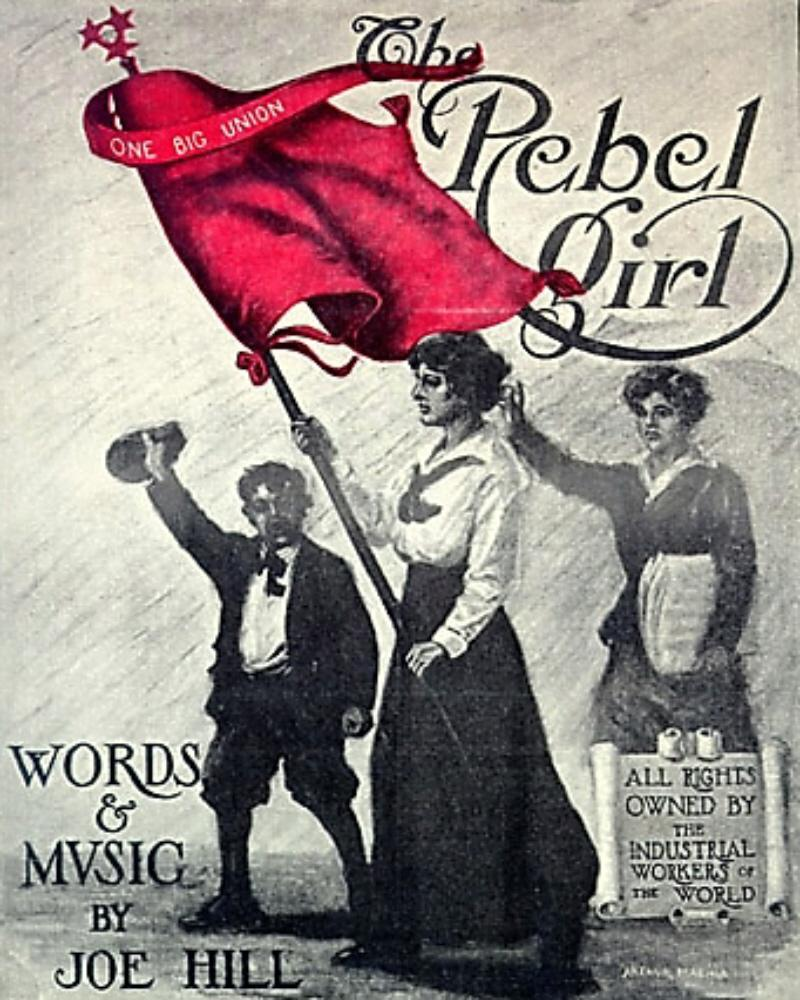
Flynn was the inspiration for Joe Hill's song, "The Rebel Girl" (1915)

Flynn left her small estate (books, clothing, and furniture) to Dorothy Day's Catholic Worker house in New York city following her death. Flynn and Day first met in the 1910s and Flynn regularly sent old clothing and blankets to the New York Catholic Worker house.

Flynn's influence as an activist was far-reaching, and her exploits were commemorated in a popular ballad. A popular song, "The Rebel Girl", was written by labor activist and musician Joe Hill in honor of Flynn.

New Hampshire historical marker no. 278 honored Flynn in her hometown of Concord. The unveiling of the marker in May 2023 led to controversy, with Governor Chris Sununu calling for a review of the process that led to its installation. Within two weeks of being unveiled, the marker was removed on the grounds of her ties to the Communist party and for her advocacy of the overthrow of the United States, for which she was imprisoned. A subsequent statement from CPUSA criticized the removal, stating: "If [her] life is important enough to hide, then her life is important enough to know."

== Works ==
=== Books and pamphlets ===
- Sabotage: The Conscious Withdrawal of the Workers' Industrial Efficiency. Cleveland, OH: IWW Publishing Bureau, 1916.
- Debs, Haywood, Ruthenberg. New York: Workers Library Publishers, 1939.
- I Didn't Raise My Boy to Be a Soldier — for Wall Street. New York: Workers Library Publishers, 1940.
- Earl Browder: The Man from Kansas. New York: Workers Library Publishers, 1941.
- Questions and Answers on the Browder Case. New York: Citizens' Committee to Free Earl Browder, 1941.
- Coal Miners and the War. New York: Workers Library Publishers, 1942.
- Women in the War. New York: Workers Library Publishers, 1942.
- Daughters of America: Ella Reeve Bloor, Anita Whitney. New York: Workers Library Publishers, 1942.
- Women Have a Date with Destiny. New York: Workers Library Publishers, 1944.
- Meet the Communists. New York: Communist Party, U.S.A., 1946.
- Woman's Place in the Fight for a Better World. New York, New Century Publishers, 1947.
- The Twelve and You: What Happens to Democracy is Your Business, Too! New York: New Century Publishers, 1948.
- Labor's Own William Z. Foster: A Communist's Fifty Years of Working-Class Leadership and Struggle. New York: New Century Publishers, 1949.
- Stool-Pigeon. New York: New Century Publishers, 1949.
- The Plot to Gag America. New York: New Century Publishers, 1950.
- A Message to All Women Communists from Elizabeth Gurley Flynn on Mother's Day, May 1950. New York: National Women's Commission, Communist Party, U.S.A., 1950.
- Debs and Dennis, Fighters for Peace. New York: New Century Publishers, 1950.
- Elizabeth Gurley Flynn Speaks to the Court: Opening Statement to the Court and Statement in the Case of the Sixteen Smith Act Victims in the Trial at Foley Square, New York. New York: New Century Publishers, 1952.
- 13 Communists Speak to the Court. New York: New Century Publishers, 1953.
- Communists and the People: Summation Speech to the Jury in the Second Foley Square Smith Act Trial of Thirteen Communist Leaders. New York, New Century Publishers, 1953.
- I Speak My Own Piece: Autobiography of "The Rebel Girl". New York: Masses and Mainstream 1955.
- An Appeal to Women. New York: Campaign Committee, People's Rights Party, 1955.
- Horizons of the Future for a Socialist America. New York: Communist Party, USA, 1959.
- Freedom Begins at Home. New York: New Century Publishers, 1961.
- Ben Davis on the McCarran Act at the Harvard Law Forum by Benjamin J. Davis. New York: Gus Hall-Benjamin Davis Defense Committee, 1962 (introduction).
- The Alderson Story: My Life as a Political Prisoner. New York: International Publishers, 1963.
- The McCarran Act, Fact and Fancy. New York: Gus Hall-Benjamin J. Davis Defense Committee, 1963.
- The Rebel Girl: An Autobiography, My First Life (1906-1926). New York: International Publishers, 1973. —Revised and amended edition of I Speak My Own Piece.
- Memories of the Industrial Workers of the World. New York: American Institute for Marxist Studies, 1977.

=== Articles ===
- "May 1st: The Sun of Tomorrow". New Masses, May 6, 1941.
- "Defend the Civil Rights of Communists!" The Communist. Vol. XVIII, No. 12, December 1939.
- "Mine Eyes Have Seen the Glory". The Masses, May 2, 1939.
- "The Minnesota Trials". The Masses January 1917.
- "Do You Believe in Patriotism?". The Masses, March 1916.

== See also ==
- Matilda Robbins
