= Carlo Tresca =

Italian-American newspaper editor, trade unionist, and labor activist (1879–1943)

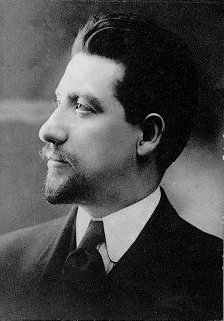
- Tresca in 1910
- Born: March 9, 1879; Sulmona, Italy
- Died: January 11, 1943 (aged 63); New York City, U.S.
- Cause of death: Gunshot wound
- Occupations: Newspaper editor and labor leader
- Spouse: Sabina Flynn
- Children: Peter D. Martin
- Family: Elizabeth Gurley Flynn (sister-in-law)

Carlo Tresca (March 9, 1879 – January 11, 1943) was an Italian-American dissident, newspaper editor, orator, and labor organizer and activist who was a leader of the Industrial Workers of the World during the 1910s. He is remembered as a leading public opponent of fascism, Stalinism, and Mafia infiltration of the trade unions for the purposes of labor racketeering and corruption.

Born, raised, and educated in Italy, Tresca was editor of an Italian socialist newspaper and secretary of the Italian Federation of Railroad Workers before he emigrated to the United States in 1904. After a three-year spell as secretary of the Italian Socialist Federation of North America, he joined the Industrial Workers of the World in 1912, and was involved in strikes across the United States over the rest of the decade. He was jailed in 1925 after printing a paid advertisement for a birth control pamphlet in one of his newspapers.

During the 1930s, Tresca was a vocal critic of the Italian Fascist government of Benito Mussolini and the Soviet Communist government of Joseph Stalin. In 1937, he was a member of the Dewey Commission, which cleared Leon Trotsky of all charges made during the Moscow Trials. Tresca also used his newspapers to mount a public campaign criticising the Mafia. He was assassinated in New York in January 1943, allegedly by Carmine Galante.

== Personal life ==
Tresca was born on March 9, 1879, in Sulmona, Abruzzo, Italy, the son of a landowner. His formal education reached to secondary school. Tresca had no hope of attending university as his family's finances were poor during the economic slump of the 1880s (Long Depression). He enrolled at a seminary instead but left soon afterward and emerged as an anticlerical and an atheist.

From 1898 to 1902, Tresca was secretary of the Italian Federation of Railroad Workers. He was also the editor of Il Germe (The Germ), a socialist weekly based in Abruzzo. Seeking to avoid a jail term for his radical political activities, Tresca emigrated to the United States in 1904, settling in Philadelphia. Tresca had a relationship with Elizabeth Gurley Flynn, and Flynn's sister, Bina, and was the father of Bina's son Peter D. Martin. He also had a relationship with sculptor Minna Harkavy, whose bust of him was erected in his birth town of Sulmona.

== American years ==
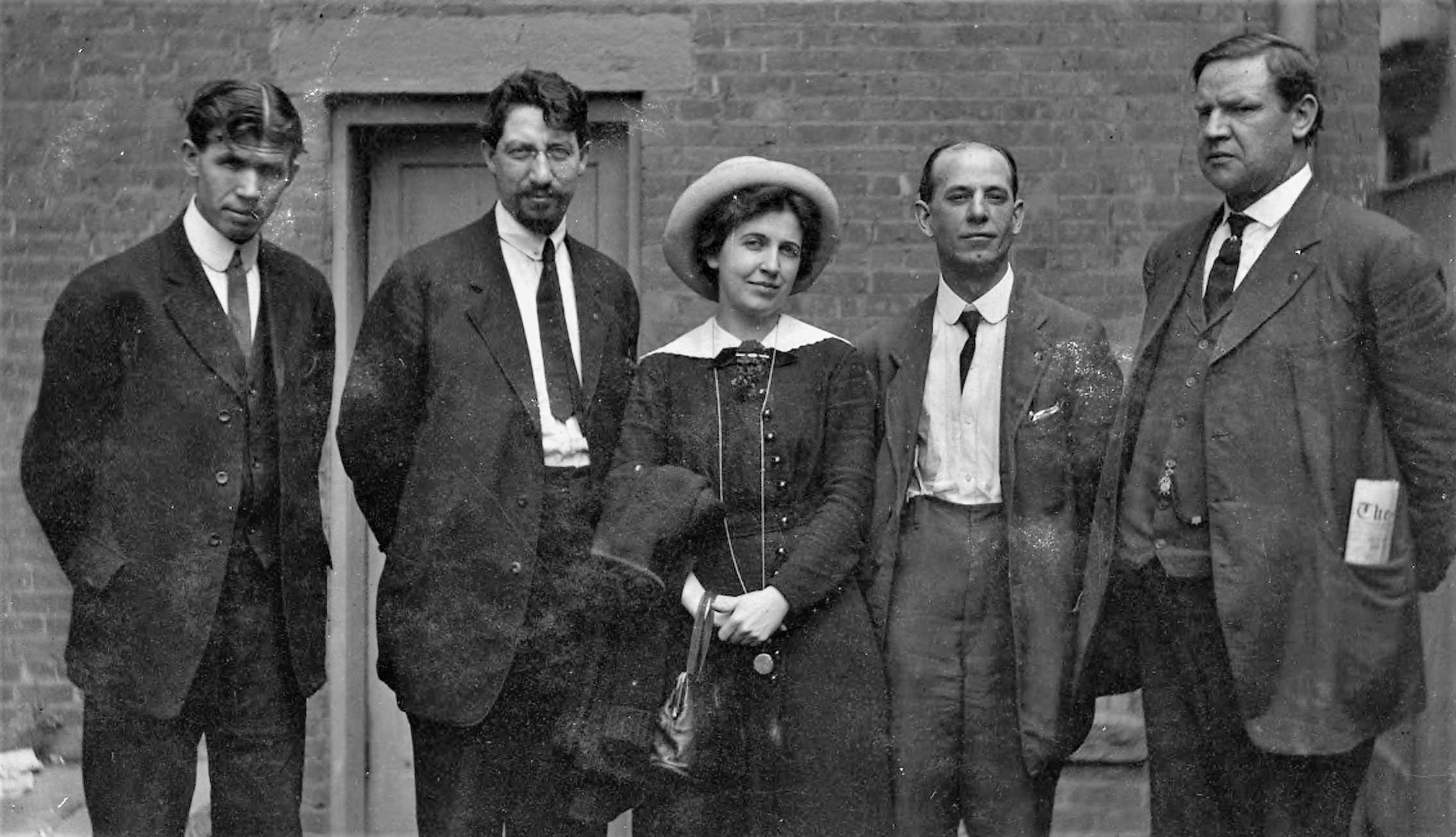
1913 photo of Paterson silk strike leaders Patrick Quinlan, Tresca, Elizabeth Gurley Flynn, Adolph Lessig, and Bill Haywood

In the United States, Tresca was elected Secretary of the Italian Socialist Federation of North America in 1904. He remained in that position for the next three years. During this same interval, Tresca was also the editor of Il Proletario (The Proletarian), the official newspaper of the Italian Socialist Federation. Tresca's political views became increasingly radical and he soon came to identify himself as an anarchist. In 1907, Tresca resigned as editor of Il Proletario (The Proletarian) and began publishing his own newspaper, La Plebe (The Plebeian). He would later transfer La Plebe to Pittsburgh, taking his revolutionary ideas to Italian miners and mill workers in Western Pennsylvania. In 1909, Tresca became editor of L'Avvenire (The Future), remaining in that capacity until the coming of World War I, when the publication was suppressed under the Espionage Act.

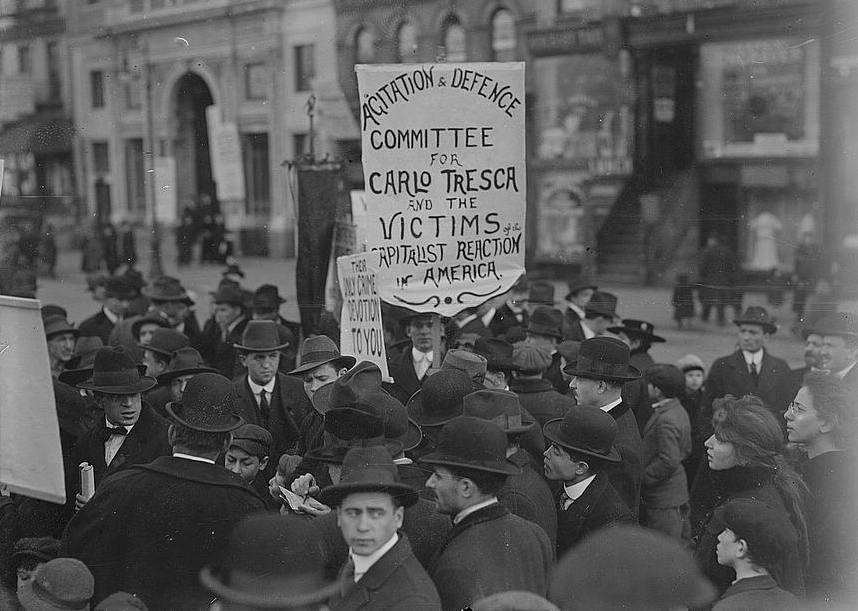
Americans march in a "Sympathy Labor Parade" for Tresca in 1916

Tresca joined the revolutionary syndicalist Industrial Workers of the World (IWW) in 1912, when he was invited by the union to Lawrence, Massachusetts, to help mobilize the Italian workers during a campaign to free strike leaders Joseph Ettor and Arturo Giovannitti, jailed on false murder charges. After the victorious strike in Lawrence, Tresca was active in several strikes across the United States; the Little Falls, New York, textile workers' strike (1912), the New York City hotel workers' strike (1913), the Paterson silk strike (1913), and the Mesabi Range, Minnesota, miners' strike (1916). He was arrested several times and jailed for nine months awaiting trial for murder in conjunction with the Minnesota action, ultimately being released without going to trial.

In August 1920, Tresca became involved tangentially in the Irish War of Independence. As Sidney Czira, secretary of Cumann na mBan in New York, and sister of Grace Gifford, later recalled, "Picketing of the British Embassy in Washington had been going on from 1916 onwards and I remember a very successful picketing that was undertaken as a protest in New York against the British arrest of Dr. Mannix in August 1920. This latter picketing was largely the work of an Italian called Carlo Tresca, a personal friend of the well-known Irish-American family of Flynn, who were great friends of James Connolly. Tresca had great influence among the sea-faring fraternity and suggested that we should call out the seamen from the British ships as a protest against the arrest of Dr. Mannix. This was done by pickets walking on the docks with placards, calling on the men to leave the ships. So far as I was concerned, this was rather an amusing incident, because I had a placard which read something like this, 'Hear the call of the blood and refuse to work on British ships'. I realised that the call of the blood was addressed to Greeks, Italians, Lascars, etc., and when they saw a young woman with a placard they came up to enquire what the strike was about. My efforts to translate 'Hear the call of the blood' into Italian were funny, but I found one word which they all seemed to know was 'tyranny – Irlanda', and smiling and nodding, they would all walk away. The picketing was extremely effective because when we were holding our meetings it was a thrilling sight when, from time to time, we would hear the march of feet and the crew of some ship would come marching into the room. We found out subsequently that Tresca, who had organised them, was generally supposed to be an anarchist! Of course, there were extremely severe penalties under American law for behaviour of this kind."

In August 1923, Tresca was arrested on charges of having printed an advertisement for a birth control pamphlet in his new publication, Il Martello (The Hammer). He was found guilty in an October 1923 trial and was sentenced to a year and a day in Atlanta Federal Penitentiary. This sentence was confirmed on November 10, 1924, and Tresca entered prison on January 5, 1925.

== Making enemies ==
Tresca became a prominent figure among Italian-Americans for his opposition to fascism and was reported to Benito Mussolini as a leading enemy of the fascist movement. Tresca edited an anti-fascist newspaper named Il Martello, where he attacked the myths that undergirded Mussolini's power. Tresca was monitored by the United States Department of Justice, who sought to deport him, and by Rome, where Mussolini feared that Italian-Americans would hurt his reputation with the United States and its banks. With pressure from the Italian ambassador to ban Tresca's newspaper, the American government charged Tresca with publishing obscenities. Tresca was sentenced and subject to deportation, but public dissent led the United States President Calvin Coolidge to commute Tresca's sentence. The fascists turned to violence, with a bombing assassination attempt in 1926, after which the antifascists fought back. Tresca contributed towards stopping Mussolini's ideological spread among Italian-Americans, despite Tresca's lack of reach into Italian-American media and business influence.

During the trial of Sacco and Vanzetti, Tresca organized publicity, fundraising, and the defense lawyer Fred Moore. In the 1930s, Tresca became an outspoken opponent of Soviet Communism and Stalinism, particularly after the Soviet Union had engineered the destruction of the anarchist movement in Catalonia and Aragon during the Spanish Revolution of 1936. In 1937, Tresca was a member of the Dewey Commission, which cleared Leon Trotsky of all charges made during the Moscow Trials. In early 1938, Tresca publicly accused the Soviets of kidnapping Juliet Stuart Poyntz to prevent her defection from the Communist Party USA underground apparatus. Tresca alleged that before she had disappeared, Poyntz had talked to him about "exposing the communist movement".

== Assassination ==
On January 11, 1943, in New York City, Tresca was leaving his parole officer's offices when he dodged surveilling officers by jumping into a car that was waiting for him. Two hours later, Tresca was crossing Fifth Avenue at 15th Street on foot when a black Ford pulled up beside him. A short, squat gunman in a brown coat jumped out and shot Tresca in the back of the head with a handgun, killing him instantly. The black Ford was later found abandoned nearby with all four doors open. One theory at the time was that the suspected assassin was a member of the Mafia, acting on orders from Sicily, and other theories suggested that he was murdered by Italian fascists. Others theorized that Tresca was eliminated by the NKVD as retribution for criticism of the Stalin regime of the Soviet Union.

Vito Genovese, the boss of the Genovese crime family, is said to have allegedly ordered the murder of Tresca, with the shooter allegedly being Carmine Galante of the Bonanno crime family. No one was ever charged in the Tresca murder. A eulogy at his memorial service was delivered by Angelica Balabanoff, a socialist activist and former Bolshevik. According to Lewis Coser's account of the funeral, "I was sitting near a burly Irish policeman who clearly didn't understand a word of Balabanoff's fierce Italian oratory. But at her climax he burst into tears."

== See also ==
- List of unsolved murders (1900–1979)

== Bibliography ==
- Block, Alan A. (1994). Space, Time & Organized Crime. Transaction Publishers. ISBN 978-1-56000-104-1. OCLC 27187164.
- Gallagher, Dorothy (1988). All the Right Enemies: The Life and Murder of Carlo Tresca. Rutgers University Press. ISBN 978-0-8135-1310-2. OCLC 17225359.
- Pernicone, Nunzio (2003). "War among the Italian Anarchists: The Galleanisti's Campaign against Carlo Tresca". In Cannistraro, Philip V.; Meyer, Gerald (eds.). The Lost World of Italian American Radicalism: Politics, Labor, and Culture. Praeger. pp. 77–98. ISBN 978-0-275-97891-4. OCLC 52335014.
- Pernicone, Nunzio (2005). Carlo Tresca: Portrait of a Rebel. Italian and Italian American Studies. Palgrave Macmillan. ISBN 978-1-4039-6478-6.
