= Adolph Lessig =

American silk worker and labor organizer

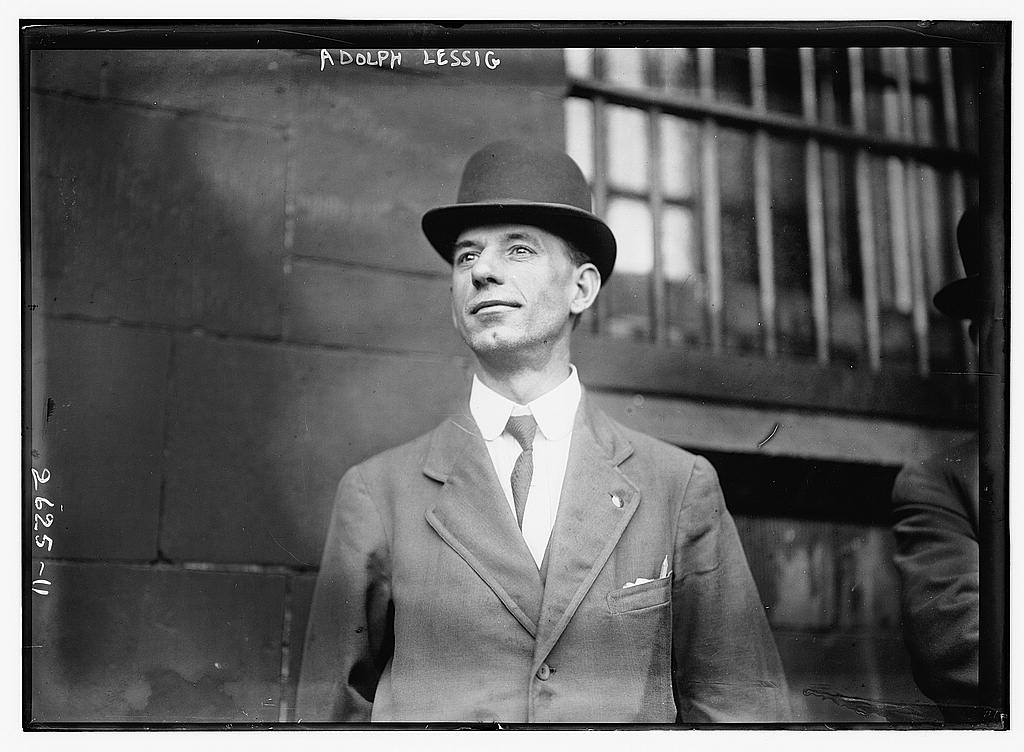
- Lessig in 1913
- Born: 1871; Philadelphia, Pennsylvania, U.S.
- Died: August 12, 1935 (aged 63)
- Occupation: Business agent of Industrial Workers of the World
- Known for: Participating in the Paterson Silk Strike of 1913

Adolph Lessig (1871 – August 12, 1935) was an American silk worker, labor organizer and the business agent of the Industrial Workers of the World. He was one of the leaders of the 1913 Paterson silk strike and was associated with Bill Haywood, Elizabeth Gurley Flynn, and Carlo Tresca.

== Life and career ==
He was born in 1871 in Philadelphia, Pennsylvania.

Lessig was secretary of the Industrial Workers of the World branch in Paterson, New Jersey. In 1913, he led workers in the Paterson silk strike. Lessig was later chair of a strikers' committee in 1924.

He died of a heart attack on August 12, 1935, at his stationery store in Paterson, New Jersey. He was married to Elizabeth Lessig.
