= Nathan Greene (lawyer) =

American lawyer (1902-1964)

- Born: 1902; Brooklyn, New York
- Died: October 30, 1964 (aged 61–62); Manhattan, New York
- Education: City College of New York; Harvard Law
- Employer(s): Cook, Nathan & Lehman
- Organization: International Juridical Association (IJA)
- Known for: lawyer, legal scholar
- Notable work: Labor Injunction (1930) with Felix Frankfurter, co-editor IJA Bulletin
- Spouse: Rosalinda Fleming
- Children: daughter

Nathan Greene, also known as "Nuddy" Greene (ca. 1902–1964), was an American lawyer and legal scholar. He cofounded the International Juridical Association and cowrote The Labor Injunction with his professor and future Supreme Court Justice Felix Frankfurter. The book criticized the U.S. Supreme Court for creating "government by injunction".

== Background ==
Nathan Greene was born in Brooklyn, New York, circa 1902. He attended City College of New York and then graduated with an LLB jurisprudence in 1925 from Harvard Law, where he was a "Frankfurter favorite."

== Career ==
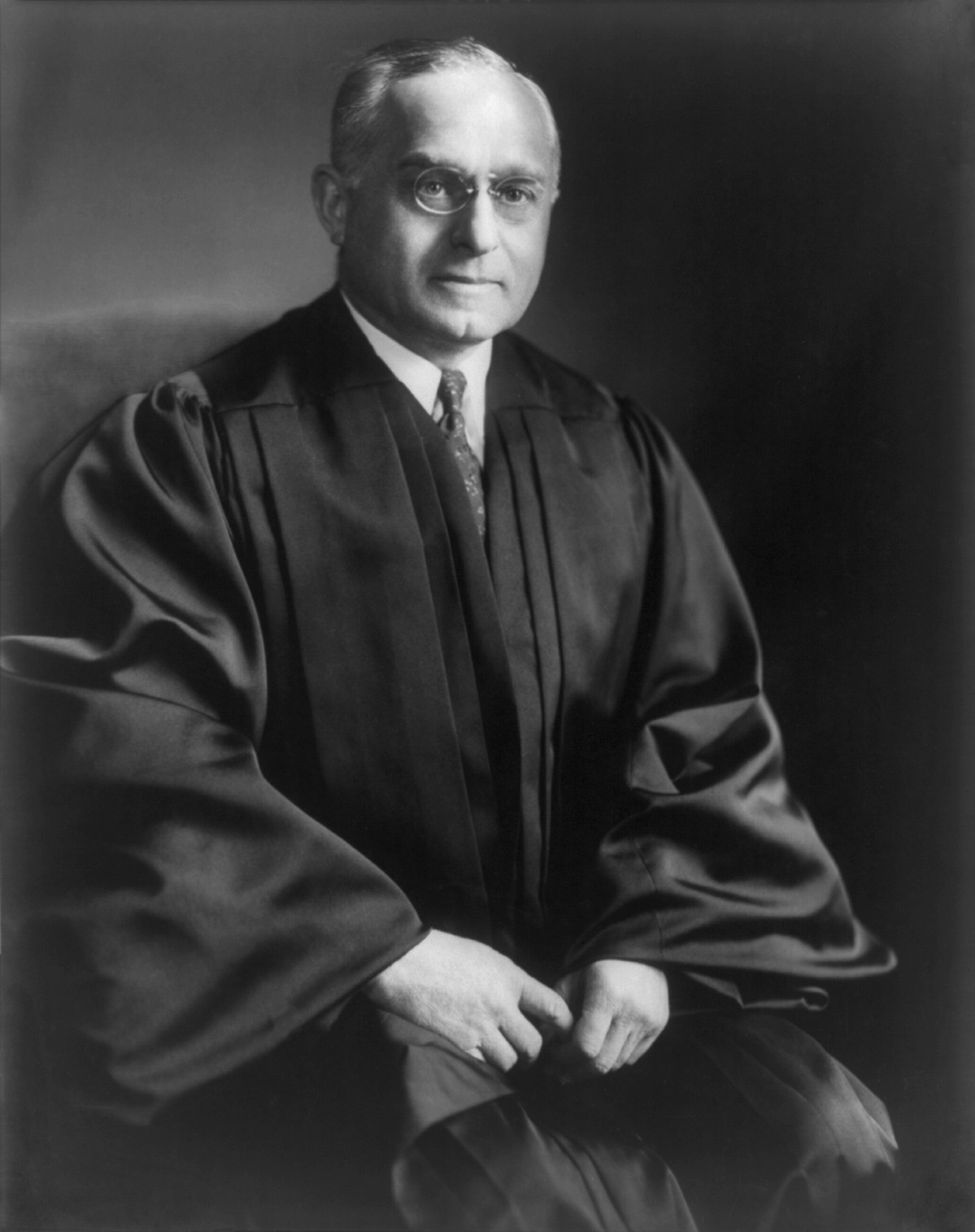
Green co-wrote Labor Injunction with Felix Frankfurter in 1930

In 1930, Greene co-authored the book Labor Injunction with Frankfurter, well received at the time as "at once scholarly and interesting... Mechanically the book is perfect" and also "comprehensive."

=== Practice ===
According to The New York Times (but without specifying when, for whom, or in what capacity), Greene "advised many members of the New Deal Administration on labor legislation."

In the 1930s, Greene became a partner in the New York law firm of Cook, Nathan & Lehman (also known as "Lehman & Greenman"–Lehman was the brother of New York state governor Herbert Lehman). He worked there until the 1940s. While there, Greene became mentor to Joseph Flom, later a partner in Skadden, Arps, Slate, Meagher & Flom. (Louis M. Loeb was a prominent partner in that period.)

In the 1950s, he served as special counsel to Lazard Freres & Co. and joined the Development and Resources Corporation or "D&R," founded in 1955 by David E. Lilienthal. (Lilienthal, leader of the Tennessee Valley Authority or "TVA," also worked for Lazard Freres and then formed D&R as an engineering and consulting firm which shared some TVA objectives, i.e., in supporting major public power and public works projects for overseas clients, including: Iran, Colombia, Ghana, India, Italy, Morocco, Nigeria, South Vietnam, and Venezuela.)

=== International Juridical Association (IJA) ===
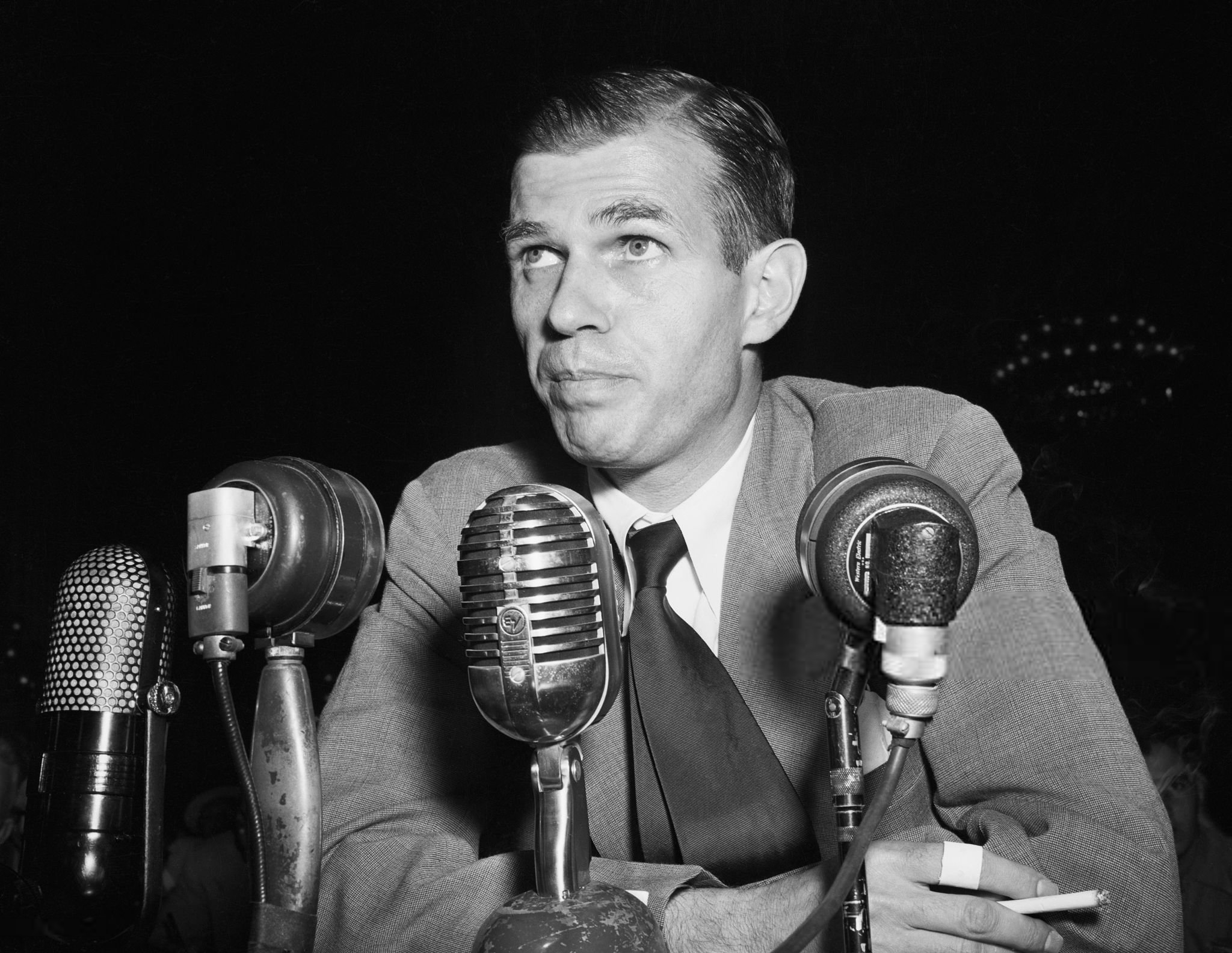
Greene was a co-founder of the International Juridical Association, whose members included Alger Hiss (here in 1948)

By 1932, Greene had become a member of the International Juridical Association (IJA), whose members included: Carol Weiss King, Osmond Fraenkel (ACLU), Joseph Brodsky (lawyer) (ILD), Roy Wilkins (NAACP), Paul Frederick Brissenden, Jerome Frank, Karl Llewelyn, Charles Erskine Scott Wood, Floyd Dell, Yetta Land, Shad Polier, Thomas Emerson, Alger Hiss, Nathan Witt, Lee Pressman, Abe Fortas, and Joseph Kovner. Of King, Greene said:

She made you feel that unless you took the case or wrote the brief, the guy would be deported and maybe killed in his home country. Once you grudgingly committed yourself, you got interested in the legal problems themselves and they kept you going and doing the best you could. Im a lazy guy myself, but I really worked on cases Carol got me into.

With Joseph Kovner, he edited issues of the International Juridical Association Bulletin. Through the IJA, he came to know prominent Communist union officials, including Ben Gold and Irving Potash. He helped them prepare for legal cases, and then he wrote about those cases in the IJA Bulletin. Of the Bulletin, Greene commented said that the editor tried "to understand the day-by-day and month-by-month movements in freedom's ride and to convey this understanding to others."

In 1937, with other IJA members, Greene helped write an amici curiae on behalf picketers, whom the U.S. Supreme Court had bared during Senn v. Tile Layers Protective Union.

In 1938, unlike many other IJA members, Greene refused to help fund a habeas appeal for Johnson v. Zerbst, 304 U.S. 458.

In 1939, Greene helped draft a statement for King in her defense in Re Harry Bridges.

In 1940, Greene made a speech (soon published as "Civil Liberties and the NLRB) at an IJA annual fundraiser dinner in New York City, in which he stated:

To liberty: they have... narrowed the employer's freedom to be irresponsible in the use of his economic power. For liberty: they have raised millions of workingmen to the dignity of free human beings; they have given millions of workingmen access to freedoms about which they had become deeply cynical...

I have heard an important person in this City defend what he called Henry Ford's right of free speech in the cases I have discussed. He said, "I am for free speech though the universe shall smash.

Forgive the IJA. We are for free speech in an un-smashed... world. We believe speech and the other civil liberties are meaningful only to men who dare to use them. And that before "daring" come bread and water, come roots in the community, come respite from fear. Only a resaonbly whole world, not a "smashed" world, will ever tolerate free speech.

In the speech, Greene also criticized the ACLU, which "hoped that on a level playing field, workers' private collective strength could effectively counter the power of capital. Its onetime allies [i.e., including the IJA] reminded it, unavailingly, that background inequalities made its vision fanciful – that employer speech was "a protected commodity in a monopoly market."

In 1945, King had Greene write the brief for Bridges v. Wixon. In essence, the King-Greene case theory argued that a denial of due process occurred because the government had already litigated the case (via the Landis decision), thereby resulting in a form of double jeopardy. In addition, the law due process was violated since Congress had passed the law under which he was prosecuted after Bridges' earlier legal victories.

== Personal life ==
Greene married Rosalinda Fleming and had one daughter. He died on October 30, 1964, at St. Vincent's Hospital Manhattan in New York City, aged 62.

== Works ==
In 1930, Greene co-authored The Labor Injunction with Frankfurther while he was still at Harvard. The book provides "an excellent treatment of the reasons underlying the anti-injunction laws." The article was "a learned and effective plea against the use of injunctions to curb the self-help methods of organized labor and in favor of the then pending Norris-LaGuardia Act." Rather than withhold withhold from remedy for the wrongs, Greene and Frankfurter argued as follows:

No such interpretation is possible for the proposed bill, which explicitly applies only to the authority of United States courts 'to issue any restraining order or injunction.' All other remedies in federal courts and all remedies in state courts remain available.

In their 1931 article "Congressional Power Over the Labor Injunction," Greene and Frankfurter wrote:

Is the denial of all adequate judicial remedies in case of an illegal strike a denial of due process of law? The question is not pertinent, for the bill only withdraws the remedy of injunction. Civil action for damages and criminal prosecution remain available instruments. Illegal strikes are not made legal.

With Felix Frankfurter:

- The Labor Injunction (New York: Macmillan, 1930)
- "Congressional Power Over the Labor Injunction" (New York: Columbia Law Review, 1931)
- The Labor Injunction (New York: P. Smith, 1963) (repreint)

By himself:

- Civil Liberties and the NLRB (New York: International Juridical Association / National Comm for People's Rights, 1940)

Articles:

- Editing of issues of the International Juridical Association Bulletin from 1932 to 1940

== See also ==
- Felix Frankfurter
- David E. Lilienthal
- International Juridical Association
- Carol Weiss King
- Joseph Kovner
- Lee Pressman
- Alger Hiss
- Louis M. Loeb (Cook, Nathan, & Lehman)

== External sources ==
- Library of Congress: Felix Frankfurter papers, 1846-1966
- Maurice Sugar Papers: IJA "Civil Liberties and the NLRB" acc. 232, folder 54:17
