= International Juridical Association =

International Juridical Association (IJA)
- Predecessor: International Labor Defense, International Red Aid
- Successor: National Lawyers Guild
- Formation: 1931
- Founder: Carol Weiss King
- Founded at: New York City
- Dissolved: December 1942
- Headquarters: New York City
- Location: 100 Fifth Avenue
- Coordinates: 40.737222°N 73.993143°W
- Services: Legal
- Official language: English
- Executive Director: Isadore Polier
- Secretary: Carol Weiss King
- Board of directors: Carol Weiss King, Osmond K. Fraenkel, Joseph Brodsky, Roy Wilkins, Paul F. Brissenden, Jerome Frank, Karl Llewelyn, Charles Erskine Scott Wood, Floyd Dell, Yetta Land
- Key people: Joseph Kovner, editor
- Main organ: International Juridical Association Bulletin
- Parent organization: International Juridical Association (Germany)
- Website: lccn.loc.gov/75644638

The International Juridical Association (IJA; 1931–1942) was an association of socially minded American lawyers, established by Carol Weiss King and considered by the U.S. federal government (in the form of the U.S. House Un-American Activities Committee or HUAC) as "another early (communist) front for lawyers. The principal concern about the IJA (and, as of 1942, its successor group, the National Lawyers Guild or NLG) was that it "constituted itself an agent of a foreign principal hostile to the interests of the United States."

== History ==
=== Background ===
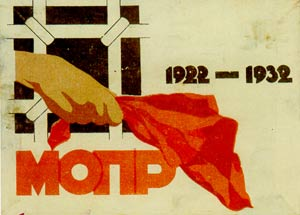
International Red Aid (Russian acronym "MOPR")

HUAC's account of the IJA traced back to 1922, when the Communist International established the International Red Aid (Russian acronym "MOPR") to:

Render material and moral aid to the imprisoned victims of capitalism
Resolutions and Theses of the Fourth Congress of the Communist International (London: Communist Party of Great Britain, 1922) p. 87

HUAC's translation: International Red Aid (MOPR) served to protect Comintern ("subversive") agents "whenever they ran into difficulties with the law of the various countries in which they were operating."

In 1925, MOPR had established an American section known as the International Labor Defense (ILD). The ILD functioned until 1946, when it merged into the Civil Rights Congress (CRC), deemed a "new subversive organization" by HUAC.

According to HUAC, the International Juridical Association (IJA) formed in 1931 and "cooperated closely" with the ILD.

=== Establishment ===
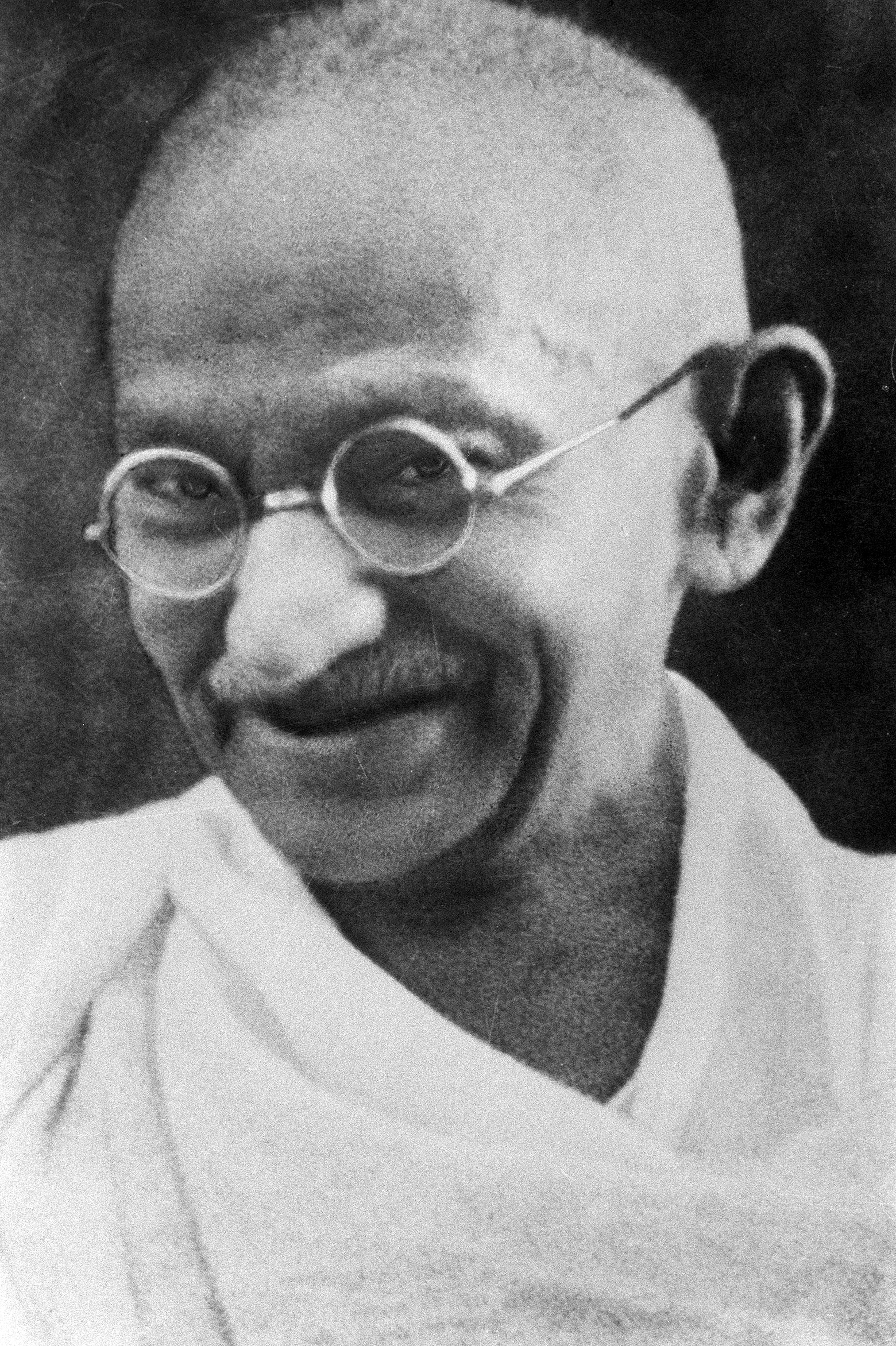
Mahatma Gandhi.

The IJA was the brainchild of Carol Weiss King, according to a biography by Ann Fagan Ginger. As Ginger recounts, King decided to take "a trip to Europe" and happened to choose Russia thanks to an ad for "12 thrilling days in the U.S.S.R" (The source happened to appear in the communist literary magazine New Masses. Ginger wrongly cites summer of 1932 for the ad's wording, which appeared in the April 1932 issue. However, a similar ad appeared in May 1931 with the lead "To the Soviet Union!" and itinerary therein that matches Ginger's account.) In Moscow, King met American Harry Shapiro, a Harvard Law School graduate, with whom she discussed the ILD and its "Soviet counterpart," the MOPR. "Shapiro urged King to help organize a new association of lawyers" in the States to "fight repression on many fronts" as most MOPR national sections were illegal. He gave her names in Berlin to look up. (Ginger's "trip" narration follows that of the NLG.)

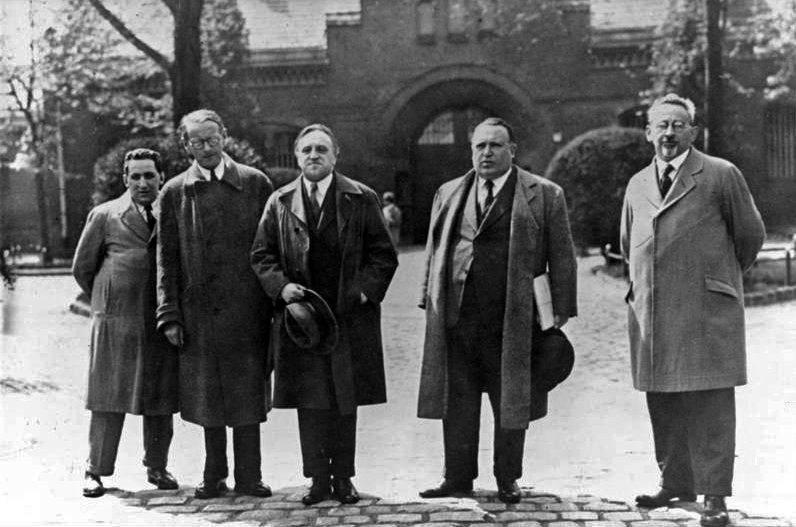
Alfred Apfel, second from left, in front of Berlin prison (1932)

In Berlin, she met with Dr. de:Alfred Apfel, head of a new group called the "International Juridical Association". The IJA already had sections in Germany, France, and Austria. Sections fell under an "Organizing Committee" "International Juridical Association," headed by Apfel. Their purpose was to defend civil liberties and labor unions. (The IJA expanded to Czechoslovakia, Cuba, Netherlands, Indonesia, Mexico, Poland, Venezuela. Members included Mahatma Gandhi.) A similar brief account of Apfel, Weiss, and formation of the American section of the IJA appears in The Red Angel: The Life and Times of Elaine Black Yoneda.

Upon her return to the states, she rented offices for the American section of the IJA in the St. Denis Building at 80 E 11th Street, New York NY 10003. Ginger stated:

Within a few months, she had forty-nine names from twenty states to put on the letterhead, including not only the customary East Coast liberal names but writer Sherwood Anderson from Virginia, and two each from Tennessee and Louisiana, one each from Canada and Puerto Rico.

Funding ran short, so she moved the IJA's offices into her own at 100 Fifth Avenue.

(King's biography in The Yale Biographical Dictionary of American Law states only that she came back from Moscow and Berlin to found the International Juridical Association Bulletin.)

A HUAC report stated that George W. Anderson had helped found the IJA:

George Andersen helped to found a "legal bureau" established in response to this directive in the United States in the early 1930s under the name of the International Juridical Association. He served on the national committee of this Communist-controlled offshoot of the International Labor Defense in 1942. In the same year, he was legal adviser for the Committee for Citizenship Rights, which was intended to protect Communist subversion from any penalties under the law.

The report also carefully notes that Anderson was an NLG member, too.

(Both HUAC reports document the close association of the IJA and NLG with the "American Committee for Protection of Foreign Born (1934–1952).")

=== Merger into NLG ===
According to report by HUAC on the NLG, the IJA "quietly disappeared from the American scene in the early 1940s" and merged into the NLG. As proof points, HUAC stated that the December 1942 issue of the International Juridical Association Monthly Bulletin announced the journal's merger into NLG's Lawyers Guild Review. The December 1942 issue also announced that its writers move to the board of editors of the Lawyers Guild Review and take primary responsibility for the material in its "IJA section.". (A Catalogue of the Law Collection at New York University: With Selected Annotations confirms absorption by 1943.)

== Issues championed ==
=== Approach ===
From inception, King felt the mission of American branch of the IJA was to champion "civil liberties and labor law problems."

She was very careful in envisioning how it would operate:

It would not compete with the existing defense groups – the ACLU, the ILD, and the NAACP; on the contrary, it would assist them in their legal defense work. Building on the European models, she planned a legal research group that would hold forums on current legal problems, draft new social legislation, write briefs in pending cases, and publish a monthly legal bulletin on labor and civil rights law.

In 1932, the IJA bulletin announced further that it would support "human rights."

=== Activities ===
In 1931, the IJA championed was that of Euel Lee AKA "Orphan Jones" (defended by Bernard Ades when King filed papers with the U.S. Supreme Court to hear the case. Then, the IJA's bulletin wrote a defense of communist August Yokinen against his deportation by the U.S. Government (which followed the Yokinen Show Trial of March 1931).

In 1932, the IJA championed the Scottsboro Boys case before the U.S. Supreme Court by recommending the ILD's Walter Pollak as attorney. Further, it raised two constitutional issues: first, the right to counsel (denied to defendants, it argued) and, second, the right to trial by peers (since fellow African-Americans had been excluded from the jury). In May 1932, King represented the IJA with a delegation of attorneys from Johns Hopkins University and the Union Theological Seminary to investigate violent strikes in Bell County, Kentucky. Following the July 1932 arrest of Angelo Herndon in Atlanta, the IJA bulletin began covering the case, after which King helped research the case when the ILD requested help from the IJA. In the fall of 1932, IJA members King and Brodsky among others supported the presidential candidacy of CPUSA leaders William Z. Foster and James W. Ford. Also in 1932, the IJA began to champion the right of foreigners against deportation by the U.S. Government, starting with its reaction against the Dies Deportation Bill of 1932. In June 1932, U.S. Rep. Fiorello H. La Guardia (20th) introduced an anti-deportation bill based on the IJA's recommendations. In November 1932, the IJA experienced some success when the Supreme Court ordered a retrial in the Scottsboro Boys case. In December 1932, King telegrammed President Herbert Hoover and then joined a CPUSA-led Hunger March on Washington (which followed a similar march in the UK earlier that fall).

In 1933, King sent a letter of protest to the German embassy regarding the arrest of Apfel by the new Nazi government. The IJA Monthly Bulletin noted his arrest and death, stating that he had been tortured. The IJA helped organize an international campaign for the Nazi government to release Georgi Dimitrov after acquittal for his role in the Reichstag Fire. During that year, King, Nathan Greene, and other IJA members supported the labor cases of Abe Isserman and others by researching and writing complaints and briefs. The IJA responded to a request by defense lawyer Benjamin J. Davis Jr., the IJA agreed to review the brief of Angelo Herndon.

In 1934, King wrote an argument in the IJA bulletin on how to raise constitutional issues during state criminal cases. The IJA then made recommendations in the Angelo Herndon case. They organized to have Columbia University law professor Herbert Wechsler and Whitney North Seymour, former U.S. assistant solicitor general (1931–1931) write briefs. The IJA organized a luncheon in ohonor of Dr. Kurt Rosenfeld, former Prussian Minister of Justice, then in exile from Nazi Germany.

In May 1935, the U.S. Supreme Court ruled against appeal on the Angelo Herndon case.

In June 1937, members of the IJA attended an ILD national conference in Washington, DC, to review the Memorial Day massacre of 1937.

In 1939, the IJA supported the United Shoe Workers-CIO against Bata Shoes Company, which had come under Nazi control in 1938.

=== Victories ===
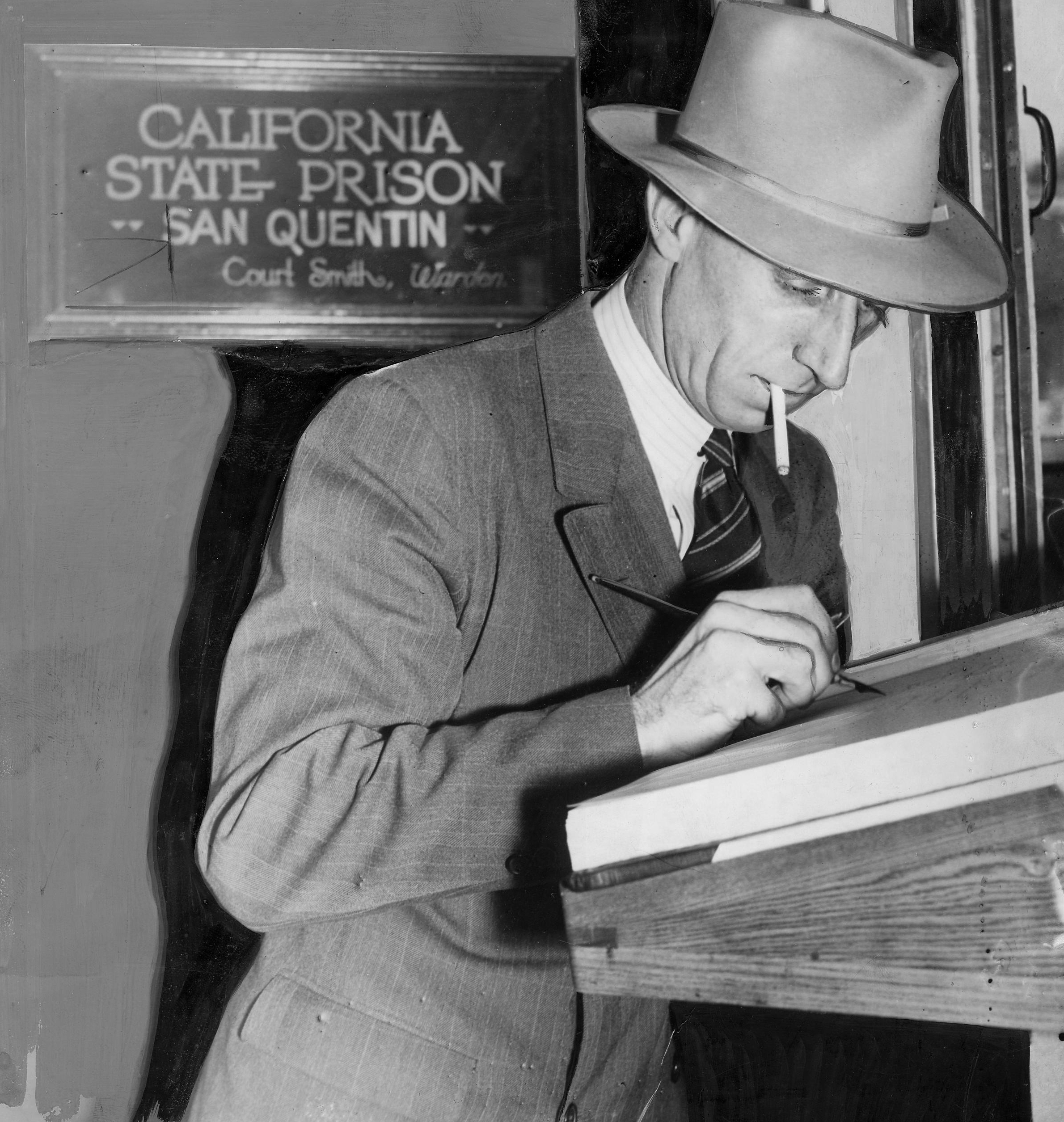
Harry Bridges signs the register at San Quentin State Prison, August 25, 1939

As it folded into the NLG, the IJA counted victories in the following cases:

- Scottsboro Boys
- Angelo Herndon
- Harry Bridges
- Strecker
- De Jonge v. Oregon (1937)
- NLRB v. Jones & Laughlin Steel Corp. (1937)
- Senn v. Tile Layers (1937)
- Hague v. CIO (1939)
- Apex Hosiery Co. v. Leader (1940)

The IJA supported the successful release of Tom Mooney, Warren Billings, and George Dimitrov.

The IJA supported acts of the U.S. Congress, including: Social Security Act, Wagner Labor Relations Act, Norris-LaGuardia Anti-Injunction Act, Tennessee Valley Authority, and Fair Labor Standards Act.

The IJA also supported Executive Order 8802, which forbids racial discrimination in defense industries.

== Organization ==
=== Constitution ===
The first issue of the IJA's Monthly Bulletin contained the preamble of its constitution:

PREAMBLE TO THE CONSTITUTION OF THE AMERICAN SECTION OF THE INTERNATIONAL JURIDICAL ASSOCIATION
The American Section of the International Juridical Association subscribes to the declaration of principles of the International Juridical Association.
Present America offers the example of a country discarding traditions of liberty and freedom, and substituting legislative, administrate and judicial tyranny. This country, once known to the world as the haven of refuge of oppressed peoples now excludes, or deports, those daring to voice unpopular opinions; with a constitution supposed to protect freedom of expression, it now persecutes and imprisons its political dissenters.
The World War made clear that the constitutional guarantee of free speech could not and did no, protect expressions of real dissent. Liberties then swept away have never been recovered. The Post Office refuses the mails to printed matter expressing unpopular views. Criminal syndicalism and criminal anarchy statutes have outlawed meetings of members of minority organizations.
Thus the rights of free speech, free press and free assemblage disappear.
The American Section of the I. J. A. declares its purposes to be as follows:

1. To combat repressive legislation and resist increasing executive, judicial, legislative and administrative oppression.
2. To support progressive legislation.
3. To support the defense of political prisoners especially in the courts.
4. To expose and attack abuses in the administration of the law.
5. To combat oppression for political opinion, color, race, creed, sex, religious belief, or lack thereof, or for any other cause.
6. To rally to the support of workers and their organizations seeking to ameliorate and improve their conditions and against the forces of the state whenever and wherever the latter aligns itself on the side of special privilege.
7. To help establish in this country and throughout the world social and legal justice.

=== Founders and officers ===
According to HUAC, at inception, IJA's officers were:

- Isadore Polier (Shad Polier), executive director
- Carol Weiss King, secretary
- Joseph Kovner, editor of International Juridical Association Bulletin

According to Ginger, at inception IJA's officers were:

- Carol Weiss King
- Osmond K. Fraenkel, representing the ACLU
- Joseph Brodsky, representing the ILD
- Roy Wilkins, representing the NAACP
- Paul F. Brissenden, Professor at Columbia University
- Jerome Frank, Professor at Yale Law School
- Karl Llewelyn, Professor at Columbia Law University
- Charles Erskine Scott Wood, writer
- Floyd Dell, writer
- Yetta Land, labor lawyer from Cleveland and executive secretary

=== Members ===
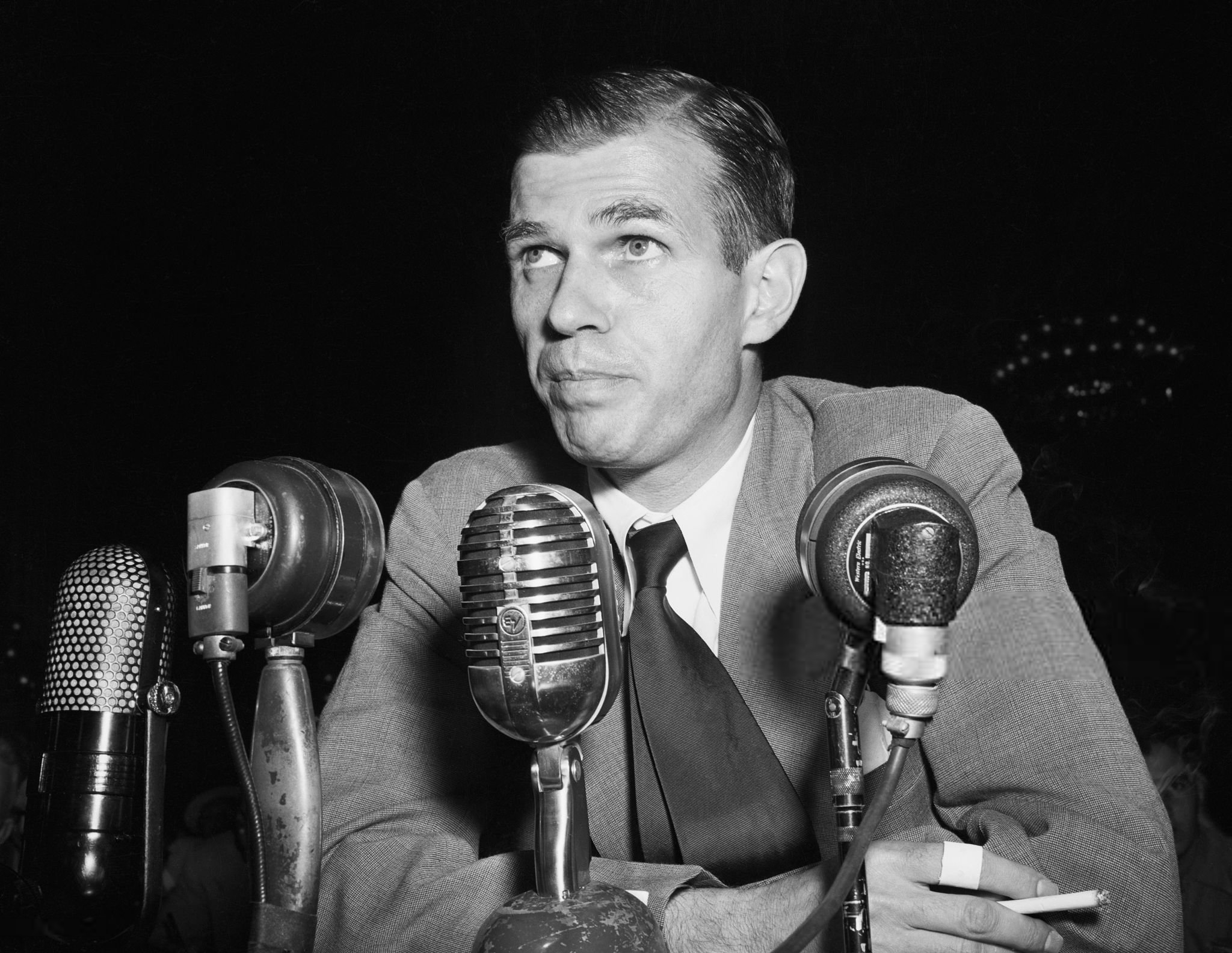
Alger Hiss.

By May 1932, according to Ginger, early IJA members included:

- Isadore (Shad) Polier
- Thomas Emerson (Professor of Law at Yale University)
- Alger Hiss
- Nathan Witt
- Lee Pressman
- Abe Fortas
- Joseph Kovner
- Nathan Greene

By 1935, according to Ginger, members included:

- Abe Isserman
- Leo Linder
- Justine Wise Tulin (after 1937, Justine Wise Polier)
- Charles Howard Houston

By 1937, according to Ginger, members included:

- Max Krauthamar (also member of the NLG, Lawyers Security League, ILD, and the Abraham Lincoln Brigagd)

A 1940 report by the Municipal Civil Commission of New York revealed that the IJA's members included: Max Lowenthal, Joseph R. Brodsky, Thomas I. Emerson, Robert L. Hale, Robert W. Kenny, Carol Weiss King, Shad Polier, and Lee Pressman. (On September 17, 1950, Lowenthal testified before HUAC that the National Lawyers Guild included the following members: John J. Abt, Joseph R. Brodsky, Bartley C. Crum, Thomas I. Emerson, Robert W. Kenny, Carol Weiss King, Shad Polier, Martin Popper, and Allan Rosenberg.)

Further, according to the 1950 and 1959 HUAC reports, other IJA members who were both later "leaders" of the NLG and actively associated with the ILD included:

- Alger Hiss
- Osmond K. Fraenkel
- Louis F. McCabe
- Joseph Brodsky ("charter member of the Communist Party")
- David J. Bentall
- Osmond K. Fraenkel
- Walter Gellhorn
- Herman A. Gray
- Abraham J. Isserman
- Paul J. Kern
- Carol Weiss King (defender of J. Peters, American rezident who created the Ware Group)
- Edward Lamb
- Louis F. McCabe
- Maurice Sugar
- Nathan Witt (member of the Ware Group)

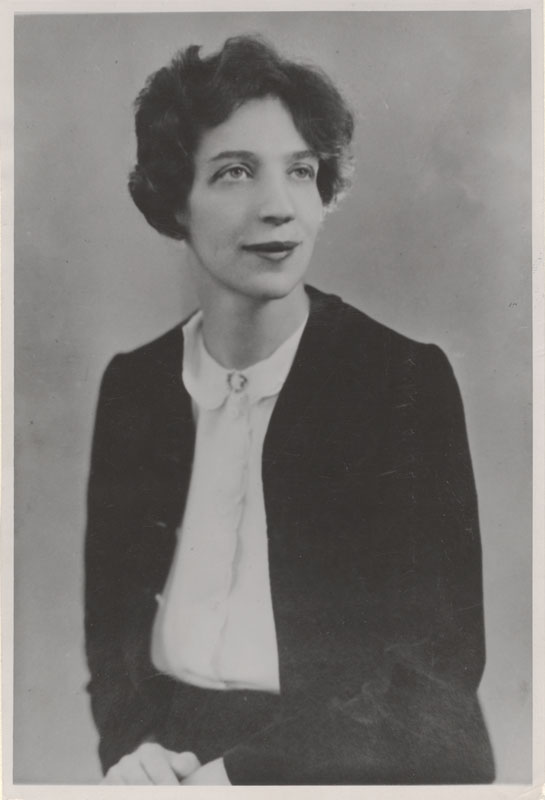
Justine W. Polier.

Justine W. Polier was also a member of the IJA's editorial board: Shad Polier met her through IJA meetings.

Wobbly Elmer Smith was also a member.

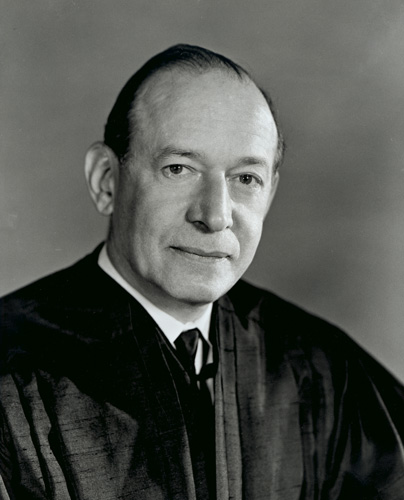
SCOTUS Abe Fortas.

Abe Fortas was a national committee member.

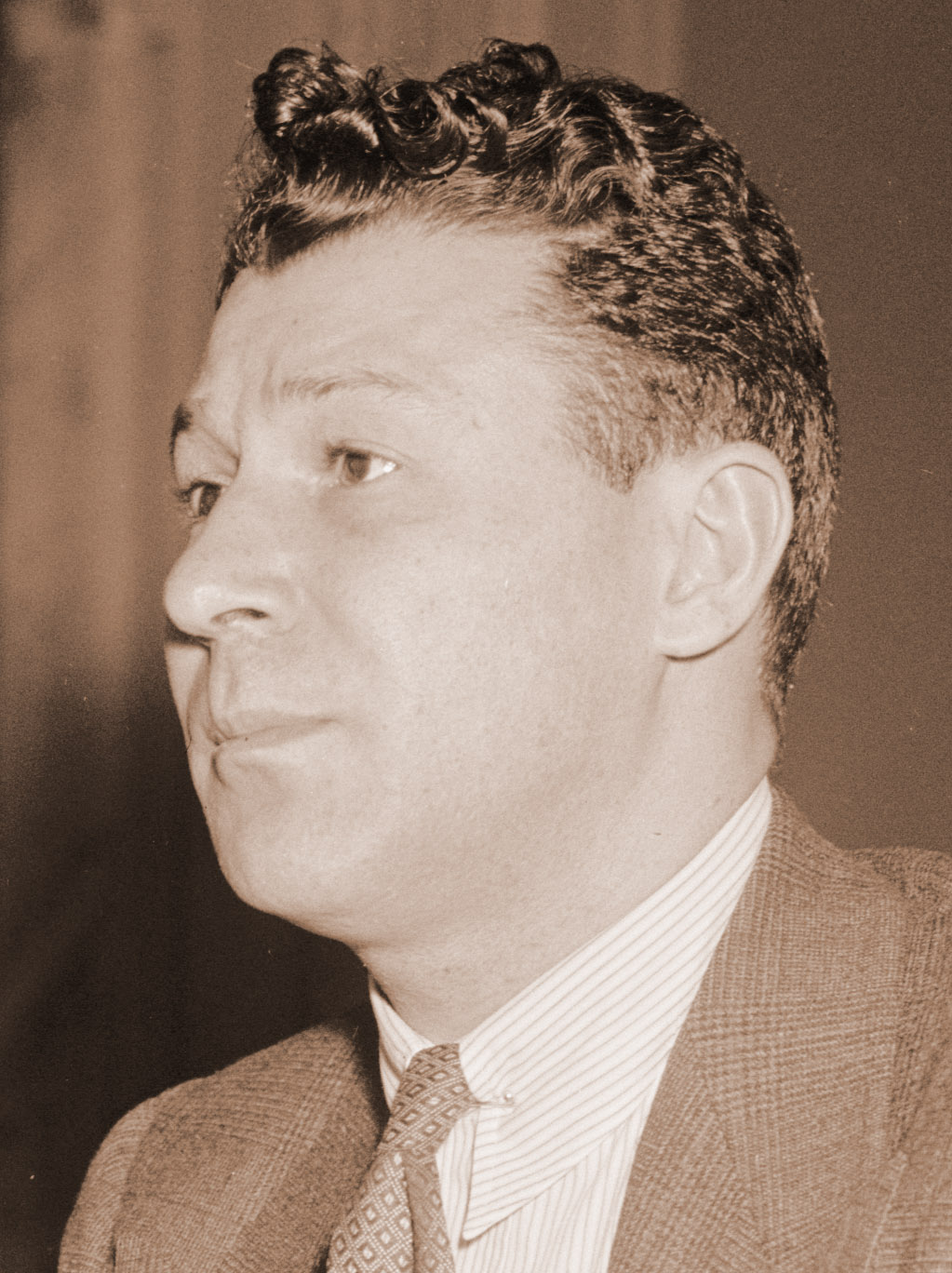
Lee Pressman.

Lee Pressman and Alger Hiss (both members of the Ware Group) were members.

David Scribner, civil rights and labor lawyer, was a member of both the IJA and the NLG.

Elias Lieberman (labor lawyer) was a member.

== Criticism: Communism ==
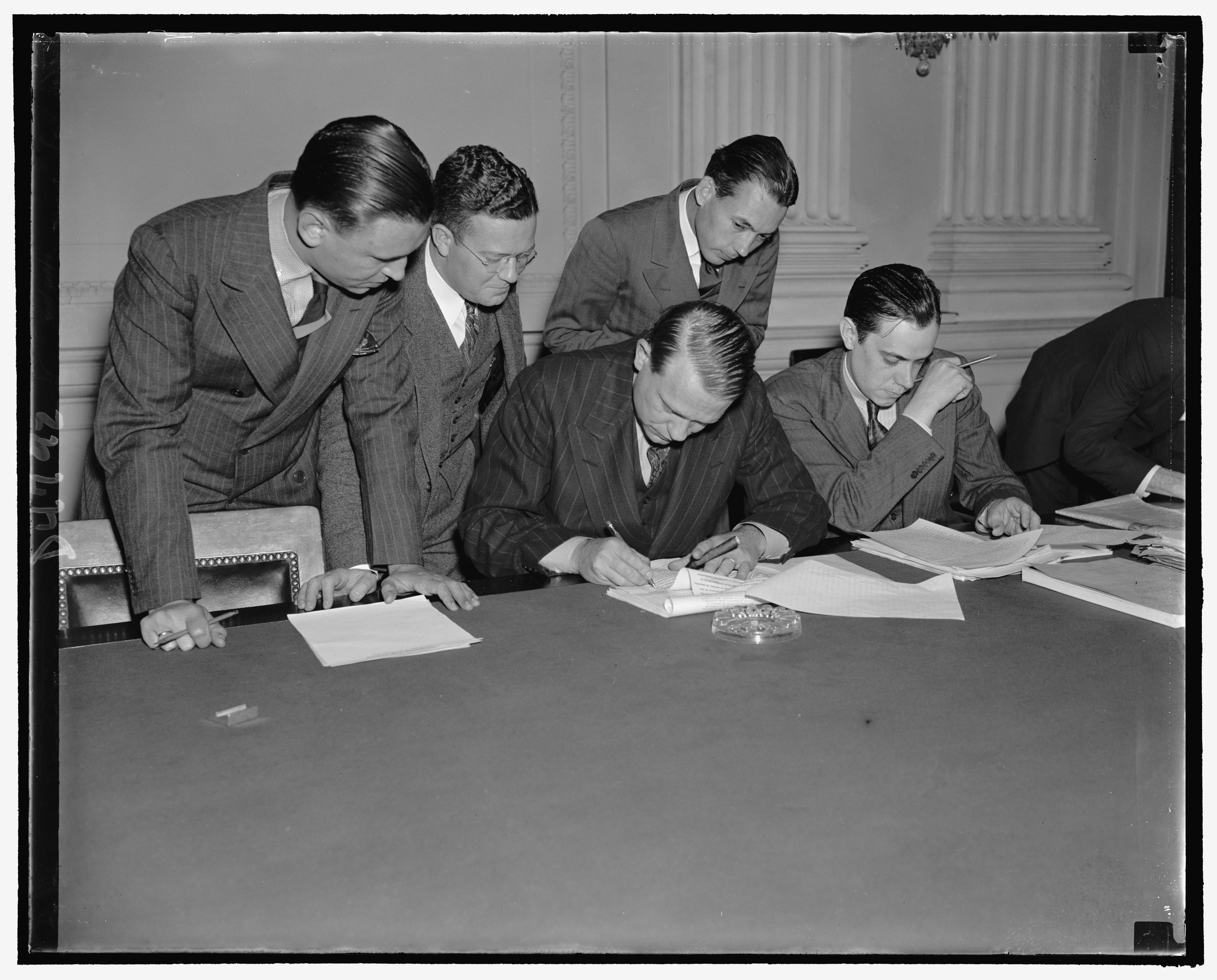
Chairman Dies of HUAC proofs letter replying to FDR (1938)

In 1939, the Dies Committee began investigating the IJA as part of its investigation into the National Labor Relations Board (NLRB).

HUAC characterized IJA as "Another early front for [communist] lawyers was the International Juridical Association ... and its members were closely interlocked with the International Labor Defense as well as the National Lawyers Guild (NLG). Among its prominent members was Alger Hiss." It saw the IJA as active defender of Communists in various kinds of lawsuits; it ascertained a pattern of that "consistently followed the Communist Party line." As early as a report of March 29, 1944, HUAC had considered the IJA a communist "front."

In its 1950 report on the NLG (which includes a brief description of the IJA), HUAC cited the "New York City Council Committee Investigating the

Municipal Civil Service Committee" (1940–1941), which (according to HUAC) stated:

The bulletins of the International Juridical Association from its very inception show that it is devoted to the defense of the Communist Party, Communists, and radical agitators and that it is not limited merely to legal research but to sharp criticism of existing governmental agencies and defense of subversive groups.

HUAC noted that "examination of the [IJA monthly] bulletin reveals consistent support of Communist legal cases during its entire career." In a footnote in his 1952 memoir, Whittaker Chambers notes:

In the early 1930s, Hiss had been a member of the International Juridical Association, of which the late Carol [Weiss] King, a habitual attorney for Communists in trouble, was a moving spirit. The International Juridical Association has been cited as subversive by the Attorney General. Also among its members: Lee Pressman, Abraham Isserman (one of the attorneys for the eleven convicted Communist leaders), Max Loewenthal (sic: should read "Max Lowenthal"), author of a recent book attacking the F.B.I.

== Publications ==
=== Monthly bulletin ===
Throughout, the IJA published the International Juridical Association Monthly Bulletin, edited by Joseph Kovner and Nathan Greene (AKA "Nuddy" Greene).

One of the main functions of the bulletin was to mention and cover "little cases" around the country, which made the bulletin a de facto newspaper of record for such.

HUAC's 1950 report on the NLG noted regarding the IJA that "examination of the bulletin reveals consistent support of Communist legal cases during its entire career.

According to the Encyclopedia of the American Left, the IJA Bulletin was "widely considered the law journal of the Left."

Early content included the following:

- 1931: Enjoining Free Speech: Review of a number of labor injunction cases (June 1931)
- 1932: The Hosiery Workers Injunction at Nazareth, PA: Decision of the Pennsylvania Supreme Court; dissenting opinion by Justice Maxey (January 1932)

"The bulletins go free to a mailing list of about 350 persons and organizations."

=== Archived collections ===
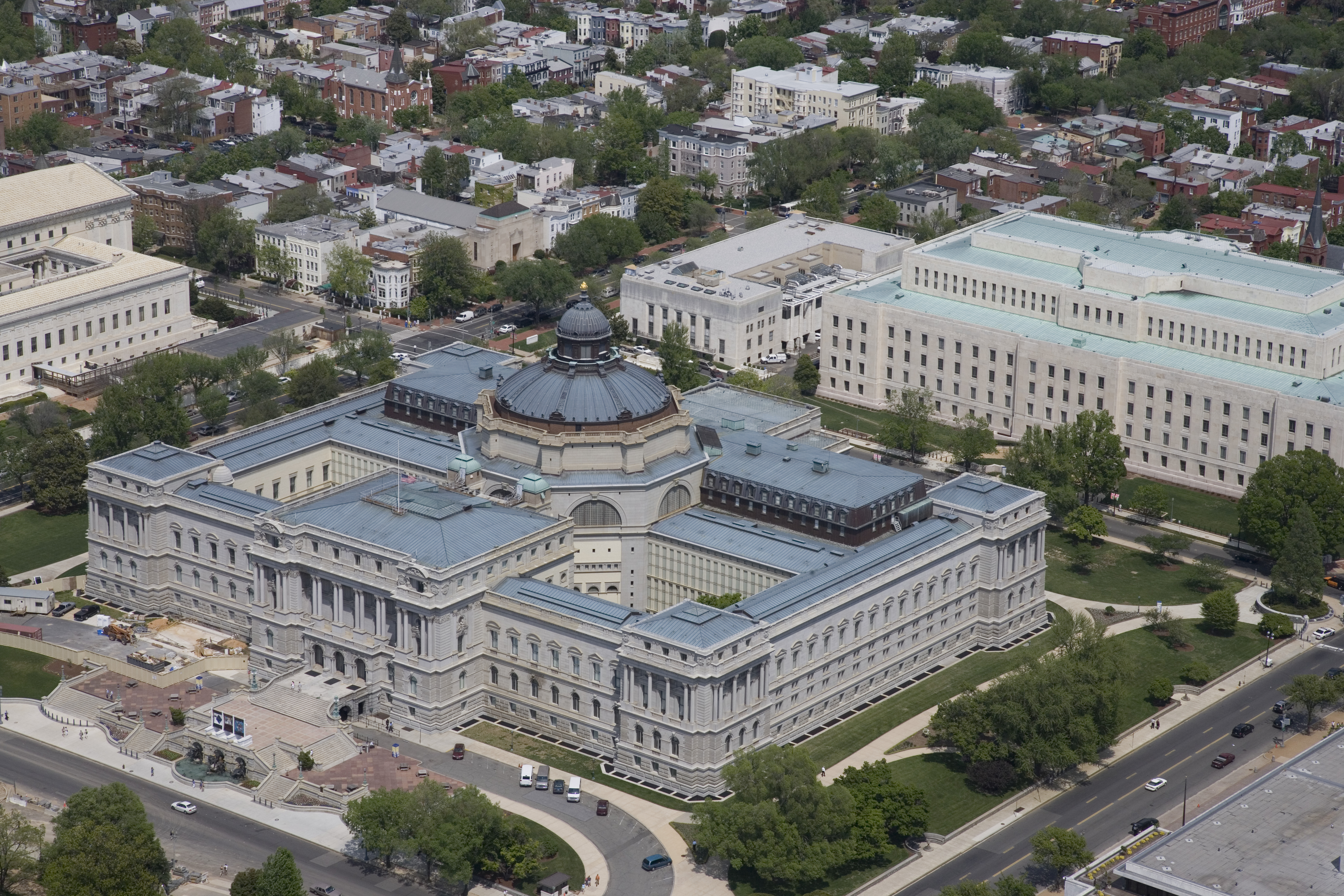
Thomas Jefferson Building

There appears to be no online source for a digitized (OCR) collection of the bulletin.

The Tamiment Library, whose archives include those of the Communist Party of the USA, has no single collection listed only of the IJA's monthly bulletin, although issues and mention appear in scores of other collections of personal papers, photographs, etc.

According to WorldCat, libraries with full or partial archives include:

- Washington area:
  - Library of Congress
  - George Washington University Law Library - Jacob Burns Law Library
  - University of Virginia - Arthur J. Morris Law Library
- Philadelphia area:
  - University of Pennsylvania Law Library - Biddle Law Library
- New York City area:
  - New York Public Library System
  - New York University - Elmer Holmes Bobst Library (Tamiment Library)
  - Yale University - Law School Library
- New York:
  - SUNY Binghamton University Libraries (Glenn G. Bartle Library)
  - Cornell University Library
  - University of Rochester
  - SUNY at Buffalo
  - New York State Appellate Division, Law Library (Rochester)
- North Carolina:
  - Duke University, Law Library (J. Michael Goodson Law Library)
  - New York State Library (Albany)
- Boston area:
  - Harvard College Library
  - Harvard Law School Library
- Ohio:
  - Cleveland Public Library (Main Library)
  - Ohio State University - Michael E. Moritz Law Library
- Indiana:
  - Indiana University - Jerome Hall Law Library
- Iowa:
  - University of Iowa, Law Library
- Illinois:
  - University of Chicago Library
  - Northwestern University, School of Law Library - Pritzker Legal Research Center
  - Northwestern University (Evanston)
  - DePaul University College of Law - Vincent G. Rinn Law Library
  - Southern Illinois University, School of Law (Carbondale)
- Michigan:
  - University of Michigan, Ann Arbor
  - University of Michigan Law Library
- Minnesota:
  - University of Minnesota, Law Library - Twin Cities Campus
- Kansas:
  - University of Kansas Archives - Kenneth Spencer Research Library
  - Washburn University Law Library (Topeka)
  - Fort Hays State University - Forsyth Library (Hays)
- Louisiana:
  - Louisiana State University Law Library - Paul M. Hebert Law Center Library
- Oklahoma:
  - University of Oklahoma, Law Center Library
- Texas:
  - University of Texas at Austin - Harry Ransom Humanities Research Center (HRC)
- California:
  - Los Angeles County Law Library
  - University of California, Los Angeles
  - University of California Berkeley Law Library - Boalt Law Library
  - University of California Berkeley Law Library - McEnerney Law Library
  - University of California Berkeley Law Library - BerkeleyLaw Library
- Oregon:
  - University of Oregon Libraries - John E. Jaqua Law Library
- Washington:
  - University of Washington - Marian Gould Gallagher Law Library

== See also ==
- International Red Aid
- International Labor Defense
- American Committee for the Protection of Foreign Born (ACPFB)
- National Lawyers Guild
- Civil Rights Congress
- Carol Weiss King
- Shad Polier
- Alger Hiss
- Abe Fortas
- English-language press of the Communist Party USA
- Mahatma Gandhi

== External sources ==
- University of California's Bancroft Collection: Labadie Collection - International Juridical Association Bulletin (1931-1942)
- The National Lawyers Guild: Legal Bulwark of the Communist Party. U.S. Government Printing Office (GPO). 21 September 1950.
- Communist Legal Subversion: The Role of the Communist Lawyer. U.S. Government Printing Office (GPO). 16 February 1959.
- Ginger, Ann Fagan (1993). Carol Weiss King, human rights lawyer, 1895-1952. Boulder: University Press of Colorado. ISBN 0-87081-285-8. LCCN 92040157.
