= Danny Evron =

Danny Evron (Hebrew: דני עברון) is the Executive Editor of the Israel Law Review. He is the executive director of The Minerva Center for Human Rights in the Faculty of Law at the Hebrew University of Jerusalem. He has also worked as a lawyer for the Conservative movement in Israel.

== Published works ==
- Project Renewal's housing initiatives: their impact on housing conditions and housing values, Robert I. Lerman, Eliahu Borukhov, Dan Evron, International Committee for the Evaluation of Project Renewal, Joint (J.D.C.) Israel Brookdale Institute of Gerontology and Adult Human Development in Israel, 1985
- "Digest of Selected Judgments of the Supreme Court of Israel", 22 Israel Law Review 487, 1987–88
