= Frances Raday =

- פרנסס רדאי
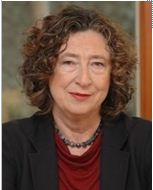
- Raday, 2010
- Born: 29 January 1944 (age 82); Manchester, England
- Education: Hebrew University of Jerusalem

Frances Raday (Hebrew: פרנסס רדאי born 29 January 1944 in Manchester, England) is a professor emerita of Elias Lieberman Chair in Labor Law, Hebrew University of Jerusalem. Raday is currently a professor of law at the Haim Striks Law School at Colman College of Management Academic Studies, where she also acts as president of the Concord Center for Integration of International Law in Israel and as head of the school's graduate programs.

Raday is also an honorary professor at University College London and is doctor honoris at the University of Copenhagen. She has been and continues to be an activist for human rights, as a litigator in Israel's Supreme Court, an expert member of the Convention on the Elimination of All Forms of Discrimination Against Women Committee and a member of various governmental and non-governmental organisations. In 2011 she began a six-year stint as a voluntary member of the UN Human Rights Council's Working Group on Discrimination against Women.

== Biography ==
Raday grew up in the UK. She studied law at the London School of Economics. After completing her LL.B. she worked as a researcher at the British Institute of International and Comparative Law. Between 1966 and 1968 she was a lecturer at the University of East Africa in Tanzania, where she established the first East African labor law course. In 1968 she immigrated to Israel and completed her Ph.D. studies at Hebrew University of Jerusalem, where she became Elias Lieberman Chair in Labor Law. Raday has been visiting professor at the Universities of Southern California, Tulane University, University of Copenhagen and Oxford University.

== Academic and legal career ==
Raday is currently a Professor of Law at the Haim Striks Law School at Colman College of Management Academic Studies, where she is also president of the Concord Center for Integration of International Law in Israel, with its International Human Rights Law Amicus Clinic, and is also head of the School's Graduate Programs.

Raday has served as editor in chief of the Israel Law Review; chair of the Lafer Center for Women’s Studies at the Hebrew University; Chair of the Academic Committee of the Minerva Center for Human Rights; and chair of the Israeli Association of Feminist and Gender Studies.

Raday's research has focused on the development of theory as regards rights to equality of disadvantaged groups. She has written a number of books and many academic articles on these issues. She has also participated in many conferences and panels, given many public lectures and has educated many generations of students in courses on labour law, international human rights, feminism, state and religion and secular constitutionalism.

She is an advocate and activist at both the international and the state levels. Since 2011 she has been vice-chair of the UN Human Rights Council's Working Group on Discrimination Against Women, operating in Geneva and was the chair commencing in June 2013. Previously, she served as an expert member on the UN Committee on the Elimination of Discrimination against Women from 2011. She was succeeded in that role by Elizabeth Broderick in 2017.

Raday is chair of the Advisory Council for Israel's Equal Employment Opportunity Commission. She has been a chair of a number of civil society organisations, amongst them founding chair of the Israel Women's Network Legal Center and chair of the Committee for Advancement of Women of the Israel Bar Association. She is a member of the International Board of the New Israel Fund, Keshev Center for the Protection of Democracy in Israel, the Public Trust Organization, the Van Leer Economics and Society Group, Bashaar - Academic community for Israeli Society outreach and has been a member of other governmental and non-governmental reform or human rights bodies, including the National Committee to set Retirement Age and the Corruption Committee established by the state comptroller.

Since 1979, Raday has been an advocate for human rights in precedent setting cases in Israel's Supreme Court, including employees' rights in transfer of enterprises (the Ramta Case), freedom of association and collective bargaining (the Amit case), Palestinian employees' class action for full National Insurance rights, women's constitutional rights to equality in religious ritual at public sites (Women of the Wall) and sex discrimination in cases concerning sexual harassment, retirement age (the Nevo Case) and promotion. She has appeared as an expert witness in US courts on employee-inventors’ rights to patent ownership. As President of the Concord Amicus Clinic she has been co-counsel in a petition to end extortionate recruitment fees for migrant workers, and in amicus briefs submitted to court on international human rights law regarding trafficking for work or for sexual exploitation, women's rights to equality in divorce, appointment of women to committees appointing judges in the rabbinical courts, the right to appoint women as arbitrators in Sharia courts, age of majority for children in the Occupied Territories and whistleblowing. In 2002, Raday received the Israel Bar Association Prize for Excellent Women Lawyers for her outstanding contribution to the promotion of women.

== Private life ==
Raday was married to Uri Raday who served for 30 years as the Secretary of the Knesset's Security and Foreign Affairs committee (died, 2017). She has three children.

== Published works ==
1. Modesty Disrobed – Gendered Modesty Rules under the Monotheistic Religions, in Feminism, Law and Religion, Eds. Susan J. Stabile, Marie A. Failinger and Elizabeth R. Schiltz, Ashgate Publishing Ltd. (Forthcoming)
2. CEDAW Article 4 and CEDAW Article 11, in Commentary on Convention for Elimination of Discrimination Against Women, OUP (C. Chinkin, B. Rudolph and M. Freeman eds., 2012).
3. Family –An International Affair, (A. Diduck and F. Raday, eds.), International Journal of Law In Context, Special Issue (2012).
4. Gender and Democratic Citizenship: the Impact of CEDAW, 10 International Journal of Constitutional Law 512 (2012).
5. Sacralising the Patriarchal Family in the Monotheistic Religions – ‘Tono form of religion is woman indebted for one impulse of freedom’, in Family – An International Affair, (A. Diduck and F. Raday eds.), International Journal of Law In Context, Special Issue 211 (2012).
6. Israeli Labor Law, in International Labor and Employment Laws, ABA Section of Labor and Employment Law, Volume 2, International Labor Law Committee Section of Labor and Employment Law American Bar Association, The Bureau of National Affairs, 1-38 (William L. Keller ed., 2001, New Ed 2008, Annual Cumulative Supplements, 2009, 2010,2011).
7. Secular Constitutionalism Vindicated, 30 Cardozo Law Review 2769 (2009).
8. Traditionalist Religious and Cultural Challengers – International and Constitutional Human Rights Responses, 41 ISRAEL LAW REVIEW 596 (2008), available on SSRN at: http://ssrn.com/author=628086.
9. Human Rights and the Confrontation between Religious and Constitutional Authority: A Case Study of Israel's Supreme Court, in Secularism, women and the State: The Mediterranean World the 21st Century 213 (Barry A. Cosman and Ariela Keysar Eds., 2009).
10. CEDAW and CERD, in the New Oxford Companion to Law (2007).
11. Culture, Religion and CEDAW's Article 5(a), in The Circle of Empowerment: Twenty-Five Years of the UN Committee on the Elimination of Discrimination against Women (Hanna Beate Schöpp-Schilling & Cees Flintermaneds, The Feminist Press at CUNY, 2007).
12. Claiming Equal Religious Personhood: Women of the Wall's Constitutional Saga, in Religion in the Public Sphere, A Comparative Analysis of German, Israeli, American and International Law 255 (Winfried Brugger & Michael Karayanni Eds., Max Planck Institute, Heidelberg, 2007).
13. Boundaries and Frontiers of Labour Law (Guy Davidov & Brian Langille eds.) – Book .Review, Public Law 612(2007).
14. Self-Determination and Minority Rights, 26 Fordham International Law Journal 453(2003).
15. Culture, Religion and Gender, 1 I. Con, International Journal of Constitutional Law 663 (2003).
