= Benner v. Oswald =

- Court: United States Court of Appeals for the Third Circuit
- Full case name: Benner v. Oswald
- Argued: November 13, 1978
- Decided: January 24, 1979
- Citation: 592 F.2d 174

Court membership
- Judges sitting: Ruggero J. Aldisert, James Hunter III, Edwin D. Steel, Jr. (D. Del.)

Case opinions
- Majority: Aldisert, joined by unanimous

Benner v. Oswald, 592 F.2d 174 (3d Cir. 1974), was a case about the voting rights of undergraduate students at a public American university.

== Facts ==
The board of trustees for the Pennsylvania State University was selected through a process involving several groups aside from the state executive branch (the governor) and the university. The groups included a society of the alumni of the university and local agricultural and industrial societies of Pennsylvania. A group of undergraduate students at the university sued desiring to be involved in the selection process for some of those seats currently selected through the society elections.

== Issue ==
The question presented by this case was whether the Equal Protection Clause of the Fourteenth Amendment to the U.S. Constitution requires that undergraduate students be allowed to participate in the election of the Penn State Board of Trustees—thereby allowing them to have a voice in the board's makeup.

== Holding ==
The Equal Protection Clause of the Fourteenth Amendment, the court held, did not require the undergraduate students be allowed to participate in the selection of the board of trustees. The court ruled that the selection process for the board does "serve important governmental objective" and is "substantially related to the achievement of those objectives". The court decided the election of members of the board of trustees was not equivalent to general elections and the issues addressed in Kramer v. Union School District and Hadley v. Junior College District of Kansas City were not germane. The court also reviewed whether the selection process was reasonable, and decided that it was, as the university sprang from "a land grant college committed to the teaching of agriculture and the mechanic arts."
