= Ellen Silbergeld =

American academic and biologist

Ellen Kovner Silbergeld
- Born: 1945 (age 80–81); Washington, D.C.
- Citizenship: United States
- Education: Vassar College, Johns Hopkins University
- Known for: environmental health research and advocacy
- Awards: MacArthur Fellowship
- Scientific career
- Fields: Toxicology, epidemiology, microbiology
- Workplaces: Johns Hopkins University, University of Maryland, Environmental Defense Fund
- Doctoral advisor: Alan M. Goldberg, Julian Chisolm

Ellen Kovner Silbergeld (born 1945) is a leading American expert in the field of environmental health.

== Background ==
Elizabeth Kovner was born in 1945. Her parents were Joseph Kovner, a lawyer (then with the Congress of Industrial Organizations) and Mary Helen Gion. She has two siblings.

After graduating from Vassar College summa cum laude in 1967, she earned a Ph.D. in environmental engineering at Johns Hopkins University in 1972.

== Career ==
She is a professor at the Bloomberg School of Public Health at Johns Hopkins University and used to be on the faculty at the University of Maryland, Baltimore. Before that she worked as a scientist for Environmental Defense. She was editor-in-chief of the journal Environmental Research she serves on many other editorial boards She is an authority on the toxicological manifestations of lead and mercury poisoning, having done some of the first research on how lead affects the central nervous system. Silbergeld has also been involved in public policy and raised public awareness of the dangers of lead. Her current research focuses on the role is food animal production in the selection and dissemination of antimicrobial resistance. She has written a book on this topic, Chickenizing Farms and Food published by Johns Hopkins University Press in 2016.

In 1993, she received the prestigious MacArthur Fellowship ("genius award") from the MacArthur Foundation.

== Works ==
- Ellen K. Silbergeld (19 August 2016). Chickenizing Farms and Food: How Industrial Meat Production Endangers Workers, Animals, and Consumers. JHU Press. pp. 2–. ISBN 978-1-4214-2030-1.
