= Penn State Board of Trustees =

Governing body for Pennsylvania State University

The Penn State Board of Trustees is the 38-member governing body for Pennsylvania State University. Its members include the university's president, the Governor of the Commonwealth, and the state Secretaries of Agriculture, Conservation and Natural Resources, and Education, as well as a representative for the Governor. The other members include six trustees appointed by the Governor, nine elected by alumni, six elected by Pennsylvania agricultural societies, six by a board representing business and industry enterprises, 3 at-large, 1 student, and 1 academic trustee. Undergraduate students do not elect any trustees; the court case Benner v. Oswald ruled that the Equal Protection Clause of the Fourteenth Amendment did not require the undergraduate students be allowed to participate in the selection of trustees.

As of 2022, the chair of the board of trustees is Matthew W. Schuyler, a graduate of Penn State and chief brand officer at Hilton.

The main responsibilities of the board are to select the president of Penn State, to determine the goals and strategic direction of the University, and to approve the annual budget. Regular meetings of the board are held bi-monthly and take place primarily on the University Park campus, although on occasion meetings are held at other locations within the Commonwealth.

== Current membership ==
Members listed below as of May 31, 2022. Note: The date in parentheses following each name below indicates the year in which the term will expire. Trustees appointed by the Governor serve until their successors have been appointed and confirmed.

=== Members ex officio ===
- Neeli Bendapudi, President, The Pennsylvania State University (Secretary of the Board of Trustees)
- Josh Shapiro, Governor, Commonwealth of Pennsylvania
- Russell C. Redding, Secretary, Pennsylvania Department of Agriculture
- Cynthia A. Dunn, Secretary, Pennsylvania Department of Conservation and Natural Resources
- Eric Hagarty, Acting Secretary, Department of Education, Pennsylvania Department of Education

=== Appointed by the Governor ===
- Abraham Amorós (2024) Director of Operations, PA Municipal League
- Daniel J. Delligatti (2023) President and Owner/Operator, M&J Management Corporation
- J. Alex Hartzler (2022) Managing Partner & Founder, WCI Partners, LP
- David M. Kleppinger (2022) Chairman Emeritus, McNees Wallace and Nurick, LLC (Vice Chairman of the Board of Trustees)
- Terry Pegula (2024) CEO, Buffalo Bills, Buffalo Sabres, and JKLM Energy, LLC
- Stanley I. Rapp (2023) Partner, Greenlee Partners, LLC
- Governor's Non-Voting Representative: William S. Shipley, III, Chairman, Shipley Group

=== Elected by Alumni ===
- Edward B. Brown, III (2022) President & CEO, KETCHConsulting, Inc.
- Alvin F. de Levie (2024) Attorney and Founder, Law Offices of Alvin F. de Levie
- Barbara L. Doran (2022) CEO/CIO, BD8 Capital Partners, LLC
- Anthony P. Lubrano (2023) President, A.P. Lubrano and Company, Inc.
- William F. Oldsey (2022) Independent Consultant/Educational Publishing
- Joseph Vincent “Jay” Paterno (2023) President, Blue Line 409 LLC
- Alice W. Pope (2023) Retired Associate Professor, Department of Psychology, St. John's University
- Brandon D. Short (2024) Executive Director and Portfolio Manager, PGIM Real Estate
- Steven B. Wagman (2024) National Healthcare Business Leader, Siemens Industry, Inc. – Smart Infrastructure Division

=== Elected by Delegates from Agricultural Societies ===
- Randall “Randy” E. Black (2023) CEO and President, First Citizens Community Bank
- Donald W. Cairns (2024) Owner/Operator, Cairns Family Farm
- Valerie L. Detwiler (2022) Senior Vice President, Senior Commercial Banker, Reliance Bank
- Lynn A. Dietrich (2023) Retired Professional Engineer (PE)
- M. Abraham Harpster (2022) Co-Owner, Evergreen Farms, Inc.
- Chris R. Hoffman (2024) Vice President, Pennsylvania Farm Bureau

=== Elected by Board Representing Business and Industry ===
- Mark H. Dambly (2023) President, Pennrose Properties, LLC
- Robert E. Fenza (2024) Retired Chief Operating Officer, Liberty Property Trust
- Walter C. Rakowich (2023) Retired Chief Executive Officer, Prologis
- Mary Lee Schneider (2024) Former President and CEO, SG360°
- Vacant
- Vacant

=== Elected By Board At-Large ===
- Kathleen L. Casey (2022) Senior Advisor, Patomak Global Partners, LLC; KLC Consulting Group, LLC
- Julie Anna Potts (2024) President and CEO, North American Meat Institute
- Matthew W. Schuyler (2023) Chief Brand Officer, Hilton Worldwide (Chairman of the Board of Trustees)

=== Student Trustee ===
- Ruby Bjalme (2027) Student, The Pennsylvania State University

=== Academic Trustee ===
- Nicholas J. Rowland (2024) Professor of Sociology, Penn State Altoona

=== Immediate Past President, Alumni Association ===
- Randolph B. Houston, Jr. (2023) Assistant General Counsel, Buzzfeed, Inc.

=== Emeriti trustees ===
- H. Jesse Arnelle, Attorney
- Cynthia A. Baldwin, Retired Justice, Supreme Court of Pennsylvania
- James S. Broadhurst, Chairman, Eat'n Park Hospitality Group, Inc.
- Charles C. Brosius, Retired President, Marlboro Mushrooms
- Walter J. Conti, Retired Owner, Cross Keys Inn/Pipersville Inn
- Donald M. Cook, Jr., Retired President, SEMCOR, Incorporated
- Marian U. Barash Coppersmith, Retired Chairman of the Board, The Barash Group
- Robert M. Frey, Attorney-at-Law, Frey & Tiley, P.C.
- Steve A. Garban, Senior Vice President for Finance and Operations/Treasurer Emeritus
- Samuel E. Hayes, Jr.
- David R. Jones, Retired Assistant Managing Editor, The New York Times
- Edward P. Junker, III, Retired Vice Chairman, PNC Bank Corporation
- Robert D. Metzgar, Former President, North Penn Pipe & Supply, Incorporated
- Joel N. Myers, President, AccuWeather, Inc.
- Anne Riley, English Teacher
- Barry K. Robinson, Attorney-at-Law
- L. J. Rowell, Jr., Retired Chairman and Chief Executive Officer, Provident Mutual Life Insurance
- Kevin R. Steele, Past President, Penn State Alumni Association
- Cecile M. Springer, President, Springer Associates
- Paul V. Suhey, Orthopedic Surgeon, Martin & Suhey Orthopedics
- Helen D. Wise, Former Deputy Chief of Staff for Programs and Secretary of the Cabinet, Governor's Office
- Boyd E. Wolff, Retired, Owner and Operator Wolfden Farms
- Quentin E. Wood, Retired Chairman of the Board and Chief Executive Officer, Quaker State Corporation
- Edward P. Zemprelli, Attorney
