= Joseph Kovner =

American lawyer

Joseph Kovner (c. 1910–1994) was a 20th-century American lawyer and government official, best known as assistant general counsel to Lee Pressman for the Congress of Industrial Organizations (CIO) in the 1930s and 1940s and then attorney with the Justice Department.

== Background ==
Joseph Kovner was born in Brockton, Massachusetts, circa 1910. He had at least one sister, Florence.

In 1934, he graduated Phi Beta Kappa from Yale Law School, where he was editor of the Yale Law Review.

== Career ==
From 1934 to 1936, Kovner worked in private practice in New York City.

In 1936, he moved to Washington, DC, where he served as counsel on the U.S. Senate Committee on Railroad Finance.

=== International Juridical Association ===
In 1932, Kovner became editor of the International Juridical Association Bulletin, who recruited Nathan Greene to join him.

In 1941, Kovner's name appeared in an "Investigation of Un-American Activities and Propaganda" special report as former editor of the IJA Bulletin. By 1941, his name appeared as a member of the national committee of the National Lawyers Guild. (By 1941, the IJA had merged into the NLG.)

=== Congress of Industrial Organizations ===
In February 1937, Kovner joined Lee Pressman, already general counsel, as assistant counsel for the Congress of Industrial Organizations (CIO). By mid-1937, Kovner had pulled in Anthony Wayne Smith, another Yale Law School graduate, who had worked for Pennsylvania Governor Gifford Pinchot (1934–1937) and then the law firm of William Donovan (where fellow IJA colleague Nathan Witt had also worked). Kovner and Smith were "legal technicians" to Pressman's development of policy and strategy.

In early 1937, prior to the outbreak of the Little Steel Strike, Kovner wrote an early report that persistent, entrenched anti-union efforts by steel industrialists throughout the 1930s rendered the CIO dependent on "decisions and administrative rulings of a reinvigorated NLRB" and on support from the courts. He noted that court decisions did not take note of a company's union status." Also, issues like "union bargaining and minority rights were not answered." Later, Kovner recalled that the CIO viewed the NLRB "as essentially doing the work of the CIO."

Later in 1937, Pressman sent Kovner and Meyer Bernstein into towns affected by the Little Steel Strike.

When the CIO held its first constitutional convention in 1938, Kovner was secretary of the committee which drafted the constitution.

In 1939, Kovner, Smith, and Bernstein helped Pressman prepare CIO testimony against the American Federation of Labor and against industrialist charges against the National Labor Relations Act.

Later, Kovner recalled:

Pressman was the power guy. He was the man who would push things on the power front. He would take a position and go forward with it, and would catch up with the law.

In 1941, Kovner and Smith broke with Pressman as factionalism developed with the CIO over its policies. A central issue was CIO's foreign policy, heavily influenced by Pressman's push for pro-Soviet stance. For example, after the Hitler-Stalin Pact became public in September 1939, Pressman remained pro-Soviet, while Kovner and Smith let anti-Nazism guide them. In early years of World War II, the pact led Pressman to oppose the Lend Lease Act. Kovner and Smith also supported the policies of the CIO's new president Philip Murray, while Pressman remained loyal to founding president John L. Lewis. Smith moved to work with John Brophy, while Kovner moved over to work with Allen Haywood. Pressman replaced them with Eugene Cotton.

In 1948, Kovner appeared before the U.S. Senate Committee on Labor and Public Welfare on behalf of the American Civil Liberties Union. Kovner was again in front of a Senate committee in February 1949 during debates over the CIO supported repeal of the Taft-Hartley Act which restricted union power. Kovner proposed setting up a new commission to, for six months, study different forms of compulsory union membership and to determine what regulations, if any, should be made to protect workers rights. While the commission was working, the Taft-Hartley Act could be repealed and less stringent limits on unions put in place, and Kovner believed that unions would be unlikely to act radically during that period.

In 1951, through questioning of Nathaniel Weyl by the U.S. Department of Commerce's loyalty board, Dublin Keyserling came to be questioned. Her appointment book of 1938 showed a list of attendees (at a Communist-affiliated conference by the Industrial Relations Institute in Mexico City) that included Joseph Kovner, CIO lawyer.

In 1953, Kovner left the CIO and returned to private practice, based out of Concord, New Hampshire. In Concord, Kovner continued to have a public face, during the visit of a congressional committee, Kovner spoke out against militarism and in favor of foreign aid.

=== U.S. Department of Justice ===
In 1958, Kovener joined the U.S. Department of Justice (DOJ). By the time he retired 16 years later in 1974, he was assistant chief of the Court of Claims Section of DOJ's Tax Division.

=== National Wildlife Federation ===
After his retirement in 1974, Kovner served as volunteer lawyer for the National Wildlife Federation.

== Personal and death ==
In 1942, Kovner married Mary Helen Gion (died 1992); they had three children, including scientist Ellen Kovner Silbergeld.

(One biography of Silbergeld mentions that Joseph Kovner "was a liberal lawyer who was ousted from his government job by the House Un-American Activities Committee" who then moved to New Hampshire and only returned to Washington "when the political climate had changed enough.")

Kovner and his wife were Quakers. In Washington, they were members of the Florida Avenue Friends Meeting and the Bethesda Friends Meeting. Later, in Guilford, Maryland, they joined the Homewood Friends Meeting.

Carol Weiss King's biographer Ann Fagan Ginger describes Kovner as "very bright, able, and decent, a compassionate person amid the sharks of the New York legal world" who, leading the IJA Bulletin editors, "argued out the jurisdiction and style of their new periodical with care."

Kovner died age 84 on April 30, 1994, of congestive heart failure following pneumonia in Brooklandville near Baltimore, Maryland.

== Works ==
- "Union Conventions," Labor and Nation (June–July 1946)
- "The Legislative History of Section 6 of the Clayton Act" (Columbia Law Review, July 1947)
- "Basic Issues Between ITU and the T-H Law," in Labor and Nation: Independent National Labor Magazine (1948)
- "Local Union Structure: Formality and Reality," Industrial and Labor Relations Review (October 1955)

== See also ==
- Ellen Kovner Silbergeld
- International Juridical Association
- Nathan Greene (lawyer)
- Carol Weiss King
- Congress of Industrial Organizations
- Lee PressmanUnited States Department of Justice
