= Avigdor Levontin =

Avigdor Victor Levontin (Hebrew: אביגדור לבונטין; 17 June 1922 – 5 January 2016) was an Israeli lawyer.

== Biography ==
Avigodr Levontin earned a Doctor of Juridical Science (Ph. D.) degree from Harvard University.

== Academic and legal career ==
He was the editor in chief of The Israel Law Review when it was established in January 1966. He was a member of the National Academy of Sciences, and an expert in international law. He served as Dean of the Faculty of Law at The Hebrew University of Jerusalem, and was described by Life magazine as a "prominent" professor. He also served on Israel's delegation at the United Nations.

== Published works ==
=== Books ===
- Choice of law and conflict of laws, Avigdor Victor Levontin, Brill Archive, ISBN 90-286-0026-4, 1976
- The myth of international security : a juridical and critical analysis, Avigdor Victor Levontin, Magnes Press, 1957
- Mishpat benleʼumi peraṭi u-vendati, Avigdor Levontin, Mifʻal ha-shikhpul, Histadrut ha-sṭudenṭim shel ha-Universiṭah ha-ʻIvrit, 1957

=== Articles ===
- "Jewish and Democratic – Personal Reflections", Avigdor Levontin, 19 Tel Aviv University Law Review 521, 1994–95
