= Kramer v. Union Free School District No. 15 =

- Supreme Court of the United States

Argued January 16, 1969 Decided June 16, 1969
- Full case name: Kramer v. Union Free School District No. 15, Town of Hempstead
- Citations: 395 U.S. 621 (more) 89 S. Ct. 1886; 23 L. Ed. 2d 583; 1969 U.S. LEXIS 1261

Case history
- Prior: Motion to dismiss granted, 259 F. Supp. 164 (E.D.N.Y. 1966); petition for writ of mandamus denied, 385 U.S. 807 (1966); reversed, 379 F.2d 491 (2d Cir. 1967); case dismissed, 282 F. Supp. 70 (E.D.N.Y. 1968); probable jurisdiction noted, 393 U.S. 818 (1968).

Holding
- Where a state statute grants the right to vote to some bona fide residents of requisite age and citizenship and denies the franchise to others, it must be determined whether the exclusions are necessary to promote a compelling state interest.

Court membership
- Chief Justice Earl Warren Associate Justices Hugo Black · William O. Douglas; John M. Harlan II · William J. Brennan Jr. Potter Stewart · Byron White; Thurgood Marshall

Case opinions
- Majority: Warren, joined by Douglas, Brennan, White, Marshall
- Dissent: Stewart, joined by Black, Harlan

Kramer v. Union Free School District No. 15, 395 U.S. 621 (1969), was a United States Supreme Court decision in which the Court struck down a longstanding New York State statute requiring that to be eligible to vote in certain school district elections, an individual must either own or rent taxable real property within the school district, be the spouse of a property owner or lessor, or be the parent or guardian of a child attending a public school in the district. By a 5-to-3 vote, the court held that these voting requirements violated the Equal Protection Clause of the Fourteenth Amendment to the United States Constitution.

== Background ==
Morris H. Kramer was a 31-year-old unmarried man who lived with his parents in Atlantic Beach, New York, within Union Free School District No. 15, Town of Hempstead (now the Lawrence Union Free School District). Kramer, who was registered to vote in national and state elections, sought to register to vote in the school district's annual school board election and school budget vote.

Kramer undisputedly met the age, citizenship, and residency requirements to vote in the election. However, he was not eligible to vote in school elections under Section 2012 of the New York State Education Law, which provided that to vote in school elections, a resident must either own or lease taxable real property within the school district, be the spouse of a property owner or lessor, or be the parent or guardian of one or more children enrolled in a public school within the district.

== Lower-court proceedings ==
Kramer filed his complaint, seeking to enjoin the school district from enforcing Section 2012 against him, in the United States District Court for the Eastern District of New York. He contended that the statute violated his rights under the Equal Protection Clause of the Fourteenth Amendment, as it had been construed in recent Supreme Court decisions such as Harper v. Virginia State Board of Elections. The school district argued that the statute validly limited the franchise in school elections to those primarily affected by the results of the election, namely property taxpayers in the school district and parents of children attending the district's schools.

At the time, title 28 of the United States Code required that any federal lawsuit seeking to enjoin the enforcement of a state statute must be heard by a specially convened three-judge panel of the District Court, composed of one circuit judge and two district judges, rather than by a single district judge, unless the constitutional challenge was deemed so insubstantial as to be "frivolous." In a May 1966 opinion, District Judge Joseph Zavatt declined to convene a three-judge court. In rejecting Kramer's constitutional claim, Judge Zavatt wrote that "Plaintiff does not and cannot allege that his property is being taxed by the school district without his having a vote, since he owns no property in the district. Neither does nor can he allege that the education of his children is being affected without his having a vote, because he has no children." Judge Zavatt also observed that the constitutionality of the same statute had recently been upheld by the New York state courts. He concluded that the "distinctions drawn by the legislature of the State in Section 2012 of the New York Education Law are so clearly reasonable and plaintiff's claim so obviously without merit, that it can only be characterized as frivolous." The District Court dismissed Kramer's complaint.

Kramer appealed the dismissal to the United States Court of Appeals for the Second Circuit, which reversed Judge Zavatt's decision by a 2-to-1 vote and directed that a three-judge District Court be convened. Writing for the Second Circuit panel majority, Judge Paul R. Hays concluded that in light of then-recent Supreme Court caselaw applying the Equal Protection Clause to voter restrictions, Kramer's constitutional challenge could not be considered frivolous. In a concurring opinion, Judge Irving R. Kaufman agreed that Kramer's challenge "cannot be said to be insubstantial on its face." Chief Judge J. Edward Lumbard disagreed, in an opinion that began: "I dissent. There is no need for three judges to consider a claim so patently without any merit."

On remand, the three-judge District Court upheld Section 2012 by a 2-to-1 vote. Writing for the court, Circuit Judge Leonard Moore held that even in light of recent equal protection jurisprudence, "the selection of the parent and taxpayer groups [as authorized voters in school elections] would appear to be within the permissive limits of power still preserved by the state legislatures as specified by the Supreme Court and the New York Court of Appeals." District Judge John R. Bartels joined Judge Moore's opinion. District Judge Jack Weinstein dissented, opinion that Section 2012 "impose[d] a forbidden property qualification for voting" in violation of the equal protection guarantee. Judge Weinstein observed that under Section 2012, the disqualification from voting in school elections applied not only to "young adults living with their parents," such as Kramer, but also to "older persons residing with their children, to boarders or lodgers, and to clergy, military and others living on tax exempt property."

The Supreme Court noted probable jurisdiction of Kramer's appeal. Oral argument was held on January 30, 1969. Osmond K. Fraenkel, long-time counsel for the American Civil Liberties Union, argued the case for petitioner Kramer. John P. Jehu, Associate Counsel of the New York State Education Department, argued for the school district.

== Representation ==
- Osmond K. Fraenkel argued the cause for appellant, with Melvin L. Wulf and Murray A. Miller
- John P. Jehu argued the cause and filed briefs for appellees; Louis J. Lefkowitz (Attorney General) pro se, Samuel A. Hirshowitz (First Assistant Attorney General), Daniel M. Cohen (Assistant Attorney General), filed a brief for appellee the Attorney General of New York

== Supreme Court decision ==
The Supreme Court reversed the District Court and held that by depriving Kramer and other would-be school election voters of the right to vote based on their lack of property ownership or parenthood, New York had violated the Equal Protection Clause.

The Court's decision was authored by Chief Justice Earl Warren and joined by Associate Justices William O. Douglas, William J. Brennan, Byron White, and Thurgood Marshall. Kramer was one of Chief Justice Warren's last opinions for the Court, handed down on June 16, 1969; Warren retired as Chief Justice one week later, following the conclusion of the Supreme Court's 1968 Term and the confirmation of his successor, Warren E. Burger. The vote in the case was 5 to 3, as no replacement for Justice Abe Fortas, who had resigned the previous month, had yet been confirmed.

Chief Justice Warren's opinion began by observing that under then-recent Equal Protection Clause caselaw, alleged infringements of the right to vote must survive careful judicial scrutiny, because "any unjustified discrimination in determining who may participate in political affairs or in the selection of public officials undermines the legitimacy of representative government." Therefore, to be upheld, a statute restricting the right to vote must survive "strict scrutiny" by being necessary to serve a "compelling state interest"; the mere "rationality" of the statute is not sufficient. Justice Warren also concluded that neither the fact that New York could have chosen to appoint rather than elect its school boards, nor the fact that school boards do not have "'general' legislative powers," affected the Court's analysis.

The Court concluded that "Section 2012 does not meet the exacting standard of precision we require of statutes which selectively distribute the franchise. The classifications of § 2012 permit inclusion of many persons who have, at best, a remote and indirect interest in school affairs and, on the other hand, exclude others who have a distinct and direct interest in the school [election] decisions."

== Justice Stewart's dissent ==
Justice Potter Stewart, joined by Justices Hugo L. Black and John Marshall Harlan, dissented. According to Justice Stewart's dissenting opinion, a statute violates the Equal Protection Clause only if it rests on grounds wholly irrelevant to achieving the legislature's objectives. Under Lassiter v. Northampton County Board of Elections, Justice Stewart argued, states may impose restrictions on voting so long as they are reasonably designed to promote intelligent use of the franchise. Justice Stewart found that the requirements under Section 2012 were permissible under this standard, and asserted that the majority had not sufficiently explained why this case should be judged under a stricter standard.

== Aftermath ==
In the wake of the decision, the New York State Legislature amended Education Law § 2012 to eliminate the restrictions that the Supreme Court had invalidated. Under New York law today, any United States citizen who has resided in a school district for more than 30 days is eligible to register and vote in the district's elections (except for the residents of New York's five largest cities, which do not have school board elections at all).

In the years after Kramer was handed down, the Burger Court cut back on the reach of the Kramer decision, though it has never been overruled. For example, in Salyer Land Co. v. Tulare Lake Basin Water Storage District, the Court held that California could constitutionally limit voting in elections for boards of directors of water districts to landowners within the districts, with votes apportioned based on the assessed value of their land. In reaching this conclusion, the Court observed that the water district exercised "a special limited governmental function" that had "a disproportionate effect on landowners." In Ball v. James, a closely divided Court reached the same conclusion with respect to elections in Arizona water reclamation districts.

Morris Kramer, now in his 70s, still lives in the same house in Atlantic Beach, New York as he did when he sued the school district more than 40 years ago, according to a recent interview in a community newspaper discussing his career as a "civic and environmental activist" on Long Island.

== See also ==
- List of United States Supreme Court cases, volume 395
- Reynolds v. Sims, 377 U.S. 533 (1964)
- Avery v. Midland County, 390 U.S. 474 (1968)
- Williams v. Rhodes, 393 U.S. 23 (1968)
- Benner v. Oswald, 592 F.2d 174 (3d Cir. 1974)
