= Juliet Stuart Poyntz =

American spy for the Soviet Union

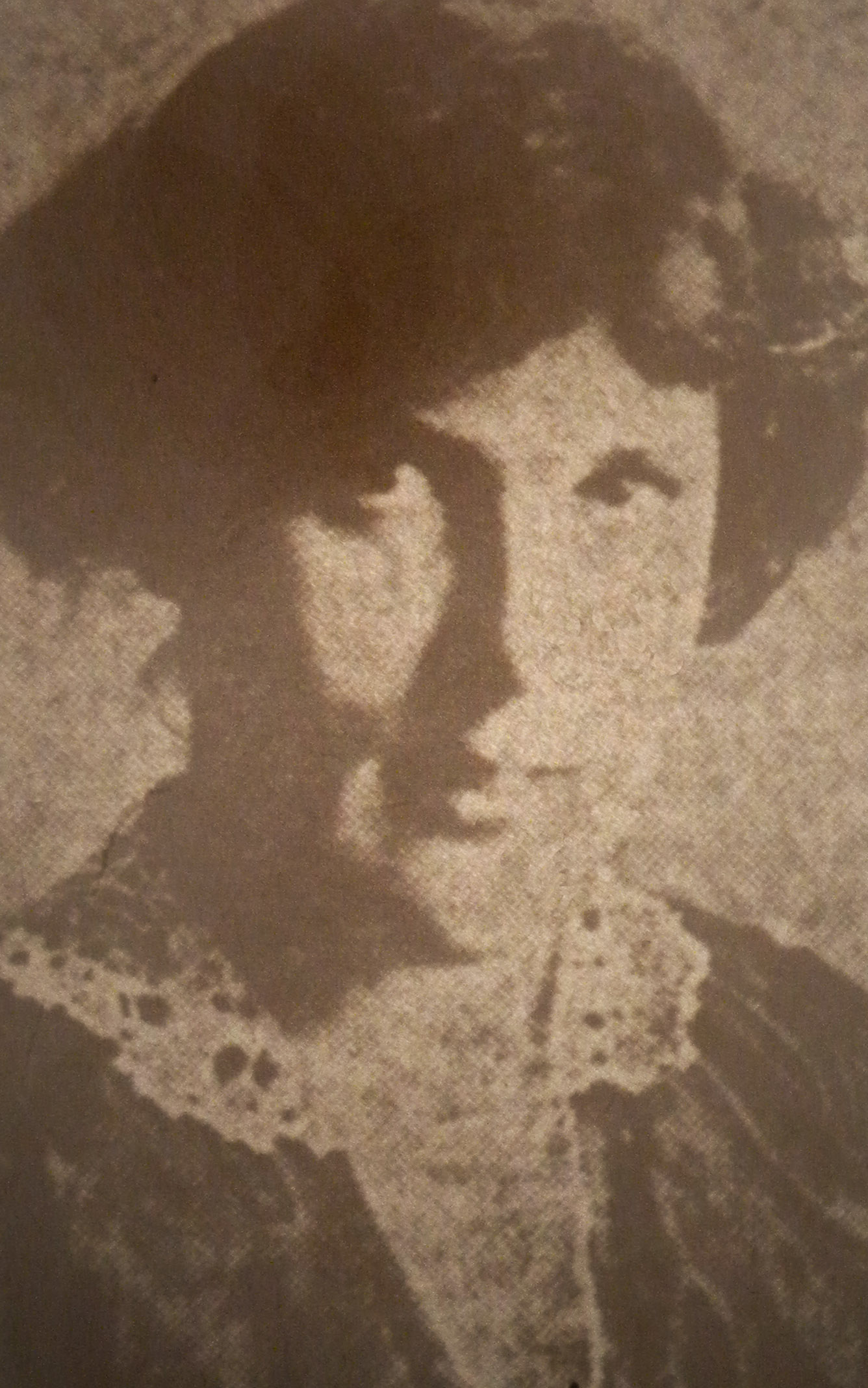
- Poyntz in c.1918
- Born: Juliet Stuart Points; November 25, 1886; Omaha, Nebraska, U.S.
- Disappeared: June 3, 1937; New York City, U.S.
- Status: Missing for 89 years, 5 months and 16 days
- Died: presumably June 3, 1937 (age 50)
- Education: Barnard College (BA); Columbia University (MA)
- Alma mater: Barnard College
- Occupations: suffragist, feminist, trade unionist, socialist, communist, political activist, spy
- Years active: 1909–1937
- Employer(s): various including Barnard College and Communist Party USA
- Agent: GRU
- Known for: unexplained disappearance
- Political party: Socialist Party of America, Communist Party USA
- Spouse: Friedrich Franz Ludwig Glaser
- Relatives: Eulalie Poyntz McClelland (sister)

Juliet Stuart Poyntz (originally 'Points') (25 November 1886 – c. 1937) was an American suffragist, trade unionist and communist spy. As a student and university teacher, Poyntz espoused many radical causes and went on to become a co-founder of the Communist Party of the United States (CPUSA). Later she began working as an intelligence agent for the Soviet Union, travelling secretly to Moscow just as some of her comrades were being executed in Joseph Stalin's Great Purge, after which she resigned from the party. This is widely assumed to have led to her unexplained disappearance in New York City in June 1937 as the likely victim of an assassination squad, possibly because she had been associating with Trotskyists.

== Early life and education ==
Juliet Poyntz was born on November 25, 1886, in Omaha, Nebraska. Her family moved to Jersey City, New Jersey, not long before she entered Barnard College. She was a member of the Daughters of the American Revolution (DAR).

Poyntz moved to New York City as a young adult, where she earned degrees at Barnard College in 1907. She was class treasurer as a freshman, class president as a sophomore, secretary of the Barnard Union, and finally, president of the Undergraduate Association and chair of the student council as a senior. She served as editor-in-chief of Barnard's Mortarboard yearbook, and was a member of the Kappa Kappa Gamma sorority, the Philosophy Club, the Classical Club, the Athletic Association, the Christian Association, and the Sophomore Dance Committee. In 1904, she acted "Casting the Boomerang," at the Brinckerhoff Theatre (now Minor Latham Playhouse). In 1905, Poyntz took part in Barnard's third annual Greek Games, where she recited the "Invocation to the Gods" and tied first place in wrestling. She partook in the Interclass Debate (class of 1906 versus class of 1907). In her senior year, she was voted most popular both in the college and for 1907. She was valedictorian of her class and was inducted into Phi Beta Kappa. By graduation in June 1907, her interests had expanded from suffragism and feminism to trade unionism, labor rights, and socialism.

She received her A.M. degree from Columbia University.

== Political career ==
From 1907 to 1909, Poyntz was "Special Agent for the U.S. Immigration Commission," working in Chicago, Milwaukee, Philadelphia, Utica (New York), Lawrence (Massachusetts), and other cities. She joined the Socialist Party of America in 1909.

She taught at Barnard College for the 1909–1910 academic year, when she was an assistant to history professor James T. Shotwell, who was well known for his liberal and pacifist views.

In 1912, she wrote in Barnard's Class Book, "I am still a woman's suffragist or worse still a Feminist and also a Socialist (also of the worst brand)." She began working in the labor reform movement in 1913. She was instrumental in labor-Left reform organizations such as the U.S. Immigration Commission, the American Association for Labor Legislation, and the Rand School of Social Science.

During the 1910s, Poyntz worked with the International Ladies Garment Workers Union (ILGWU). At Local 25, she met Elias Lieberman, later her attorney. When Poyntz became education director of the ILGWU's Worker's University, she reported to Lieberman as chair of Local 25's Educational Committee. In 1918, she left the ILGWU. She continued to work within the Socialist Party-oriented ILGWU after siding with the fledgling Communist Party USA. During the 1920s, Poyntz was on the staff of the Friends of the Soviet Union and International Labor Defense.

In November 1926, she ran for New York State Comptroller and in November 1928 for New York State Attorney General, both times on the Workers Party ticket.

She later quit her outside work in favor of intelligence activities for the Soviet OGPU during the "Third Period".

According to a book by Benjamin Gitlow, a founding member of the CPUSA, Poyntz was a delegate to several consecutive American Communist Party conventions, and was a member of the Party's Central Executive Committee, besides being on New York's District Executive Committee. She had gone to China on a Comintern (Communist International) mission, and had dropped out of the CPUSA in 1934 in order to work for the OGPU (Soviet military secret police) in gathering scientific information for the Soviet Union. In 1936, Poyntz secretly travelled to Moscow to receive further instructions from Soviet authorities, and was seen there in the company of George Mink (alias Minkoff), an American later implicated in the disappearance of several Trotkskyists during the Spanish Civil War. While there, Poyntz witnessed the Great Purge instigated by Stalin, in which people she had known and worked with were killed. She returned to the U.S. disillusioned and unwilling to continue spying for the OGPU (later the NKVD).

== Disappearance ==
On the evening of June 3, 1937, Poyntz disappeared after leaving the American Woman's Association Clubhouse at 353 West 57th Street in Manhattan, New York City. A police investigation turned up no clues to her fate. Her belongings, all of her clothing, and hand luggage in her room appeared to be untouched, which suggested that she had not intended to leave the building for very long.

In early 1938, Carlo Tresca, a leading Italian-American anarchist, publicly accused the Soviets of kidnapping Poyntz in order to prevent her defection. He said that before she disappeared, she had come to him to talk over her disgust at what she had seen in Moscow in 1936 in the early stages of Joseph Stalin's Great Purge.

Testimony by former Soviet agent Whittaker Chambers tied Poyntz's disappearance to the shadowy Soviet Comintern agent Josef Peters. As an inside member of the Soviet Comintern and OGPU espionage network, Peters is believed to have participated in the planning of the kidnapping and alleged murder of fellow CPUSA member Poyntz by a Soviet assassination squad.

Chambers later stated that he heard Poyntz had been killed for attempted desertion, and this rumor contributed to his caution when he defected in 1938. Elizabeth Bentley stated she was told by Jacob Golos in the late 1930s, and later by KGB officer Anatoli Gromov in 1945, that Poyntz had been a traitor and was now dead. Both Chambers' and Bentley's defections were probably in part motivated by fear of the example set in the Poyntz case.

Author Benjamin Gitlow wrote that Poyntz was disillusioned by Stalin's purges and was unwilling to continue as an espionage agent for the USSR. Gitlow relates that the OGPU/NKVD used Poyntz's former lover, a man named Shakne Epshtein (Shachno Epstein (1881–1945)), the associate editor of the Communist Yiddish daily Morgen Freiheit (and an OGPU/NKVD agent himself), to lure Poyntz out for a walk in Central Park. "They met at Columbus Circle and proceeded to walk through Central Park ... Shachno took her by the arm and led her up a side path, where a large black limousine hugged the edge of the walk ... Two men jumped out, grabbed Miss Poyntz, shoved her into the car and sped away." Gitlow relates that the assassins took Poyntz to the woods near the Roosevelt estate in Dutchess County, and killed and buried her there. "The body was covered with lime and dirt. On top were placed dead leaves and branches which the three killers trampled down with their feet."

Before his own mysterious death, the GRU defector Walter Krivitsky suggested another motive for the NKVD kidnapping of Poyntz. During one of her sojourns in Moscow, Poyntz had become a lover of Red Army Corps Commander Vitovt Putna. In August 1936, the NKVD arrested Putna and accused him of maintaining contacts with Leon Trotsky, from whom he had allegedly received "terrorist directives." Under torture, Putna testified to the existence of a "nation-wide" center of Trotskyists, and to his involvement in a "parallel" military organization. On June 11, 1937, a military tribunal, in camera, condemned Putna and other high-ranking officers to death in the judicial frame-up known as the Moscow Trial of the Trotskyist Anti-Soviet Military Organization. The NKVD, according to Krivitsky, may have abducted Poyntz one week before the trial out of fear that she would defect once the execution of Putna became known, or simply because she was a known friend of the "enemy" Putna.

== Personal life ==
In 1913, Poyntz married Dr. Friedrich Franz Ludwig Glaser, a communist and attache at the German consulate in New York. She kept her maiden name, although she changed the spelling from "Points" to "Poyntz".

== See also ==
- List of people who disappeared
