= Louis M. Loeb =

American lawyer

Louis Melville Loeb (July 12, 1898 – March 16, 1979) was a New York City lawyer, general counsel for The New York Times, and a president of the New York City Bar Association.

== Early life and education ==
Louis Loeb was born in New York City on July 12, 1898 to Emil and Blanche (Pulaski). He was educated at Phillips Exeter Academy, graduating in 1915. He attended Yale University from 1915 to 1919, and Columbia Law School from 1919 to 1922. His education was interrupted by the outbreak of World War I, in which he served as a second lieutenant of field artillery in the United States Army. At Yale, he was a champion swimmer and an actor.

In 1926, he married Janet Cook and raised a son, Robert Louis Loeb, and daughter, Suzanne.

== Career ==
Loeb began his career in 1923 with the law firm of Cook, Nathan, & Lehman. He was partner from 1927 to 1947, until becoming a partner at the firm of Lord Day & Lord from 1948 to 1972.

While at Lord Day, Loeb's most prominent client was the New York Times Company, which he represented as general counsel from 1948 to 1967. Most famously, Loeb successfully represented the Times in the 1964 case New York Times Co. v. Sullivan before the United States Supreme Court. The court's ruling held that news publications could not be sued for libel by public figures unless the plaintiffs were able to establish actual malice in the false reporting of a news story. The case, which had been brought against the Times by Montgomery, Alabama public safety commissioner L.B. Sullivan, allowed newspapers to report on the widespread chaos and police abuse accompanying the civil rights movement. Loeb later called the libel cases he argued for The New York Times "the heaviest responsibility I've ever had since I began practicing law."

In addition to private practice, Loeb held many civic posts. He served as president of the New York City Bar Association from 1956 to 1958. In 1970, he presided over the Bar's Committee on Congressional Ethics, which recommended that legislators divest themselves of holdings in companies relevant to legislation they were drafting. He was also on the New York City Board of Health, and was life governor of the Society for New York Hospitals. He and his wife, Janet Cook Loeb, made financial contributions to the expansion of Scripps Hospital in La Jolla, California, and bequeathed one million dollars to the San Diego Zoological Society. Loeb was a longtime member of the Yale Club and Century Club in New York City and San Diego.

== Death ==
Loeb died of a heart attack on March 16, 1979 in San Diego, California. He was 80 years old.

== See also ==
- Nathan Greene (Cook, Nathan, & Lehman)

== Sources ==
- “Louis M. Loeb, 80; Was Times Counsel.” The New York Times. March 17, 1979.
- New York Times Co. v. Sullivan Supreme Court Decision (1964)
