= Elias Lieberman (labor lawyer) =

American lawyer

- Born: Elias Hillel Liberman; November 10, 1888; Russian Empire
- Died: October 1969 (aged 80); New York City
- Education: New York University
- Occupation: labor lawyer
- Years active: 1912-1969
- Employer: International Ladies Garment Workers Union (ILGWU)
- Known for: attorney for Juliet Stuart Poyntz
- Political party: Socialist Party of America
- Website: rmc.library.cornell.edu/EAD/htmldocs/KCL06036-001.html#d0e171

Elias Lieberman (1888–1969) was a Russian-born, 20th-century American labor lawyer who spent his career in the service of the International Ladies Garment Workers Union (ILGWU) and became known as the "Dean of American Labor Lawyers."

== Background ==
Elias Lieberman was born Elias Hillel Liberman on November 10, 1888, in Bobr, then Russian Empire, now Belarus, where he attended the Minsk yeshiva and high school. In 1909, he arrived in the US and worked various jobs while studying law. In 1920, he received an LLB in law from New York University.

== Career ==
In 1913, Lieberman became deputy clerk of ILGWU Local 25. In 1915 or 1917, he became he became chairman of the ILGWU Local 25's Educational Committee, while Juliet Stuart Poyntz became education director of the Worker's University . In 1916, he became chief clerk. In 1918, he worked with the publication department.

In 1920, Lieberman became an attorney and counsel for the ILGWU (through the 1960s). In 1922, he was admitted to the New York Bar and Federal Bar. He also served as counsel for United Hatters, Cap and Millinery Workers International Union, the International Jewelry Workers' Union Local 1, United Furniture Workers of America, and International Ladies' Handbag, Pocketbook and Novelty Workers' Union among others.

Lieberman also joined The Workmen's Circle (now The Workers Circle), where he served as national executive (1931–1935) an vice president (1933–1935).

Lieberman was also a member of the International Juridical Association, which he told the Federal Bureau of Investigation.

== Death ==
Lieberman died in October 1969.

== Legacy ==
In 1973, the National Center Library at Baruch University started with an initial grant from the Elias Lieberman Foundation.

Also in 1973, Hebrew University's Faculty of Law on Mount Scopus launched an Elias Lieberman Chair in Labor Law. Professor Itzhak Zamir was first to hold the chair. Frances Raday also held that chair.

Lieberman's work remains cited by others, e.g., Labor Relations and the Law (1996).

== Works ==
The review of Unions Before the Bar noted that "Mr. Lieberman writes for the layman and not for the lawyer... a difficult task because it is almost impossible to translate the legal cant." The book presents 27 labor cases and an analysis of the Taft-Hartley Act.

Books

- The Collective Labor Agreement: How to Negotiate and Draft the Contract (1939)
- Unions Before the Bar: Historic Trials Showing the Evolution of Labor Rights in the United States (1950)

== See also ==
- ILGWU
- Juliet Stuart Poyntz
