= Israel Law Review =

- Discipline: Law
- Language: English

Publication details
- History: 1966–present
- Publisher: Hebrew University's Minerva Center for Human Rights (Israel)
- Frequency: Quarterly

Standard abbreviations
- ISO 4: Isr. Law Rev.

Indexing
- ISSN: 0021-2237
- OCLC no.: 1754008

Links
- Journal homepage

The Israel Law Review is the oldest Israeli law journal published in English. The journal focuses on Israeli law and on issues relevant to Israeli society.

== History ==
The journal was established in January 1966 by the Israeli Law Review Association, under the auspices of senior members of the Faculty of Law of the Hebrew University of Jerusalem. It has been published since 2009 by Cambridge University Press under the management of the Minerva Center for Human Rights at the Law Faculty of the Hebrew University of Jerusalem. Originally there was consideration given to publishing the journal in French, but the decision was made to publish it in English. It was peer-reviewed from the outset.

When the journal was established, it became the second law review in Israel, the first being Ha-Praklit ("The Attorney"), which was run by the Israeli Bar and published short practical articles in Hebrew.

At the time of its establishment, Avigdor Levontin was its editor-in-chief. From 1996 until 2001, its editor was Frances Raday. Currently, it is edited by Yuval Shany and Malcolm Shaw.

== Abstracting and indexing ==
The journal is indexed in LexisNexis, Hein, and EBSCO databases.

== Notable articles ==
In 1969, Israeli Supreme Court Justice Haim Cohn published an article in the journal, which was reported on by the Associated Press and picked up widely by newspapers, in which he indicated that Jewish officials sought to save Jesus from Roman execution, but he refused to cooperate.
