= Osmond Fraenkel =

American attorney

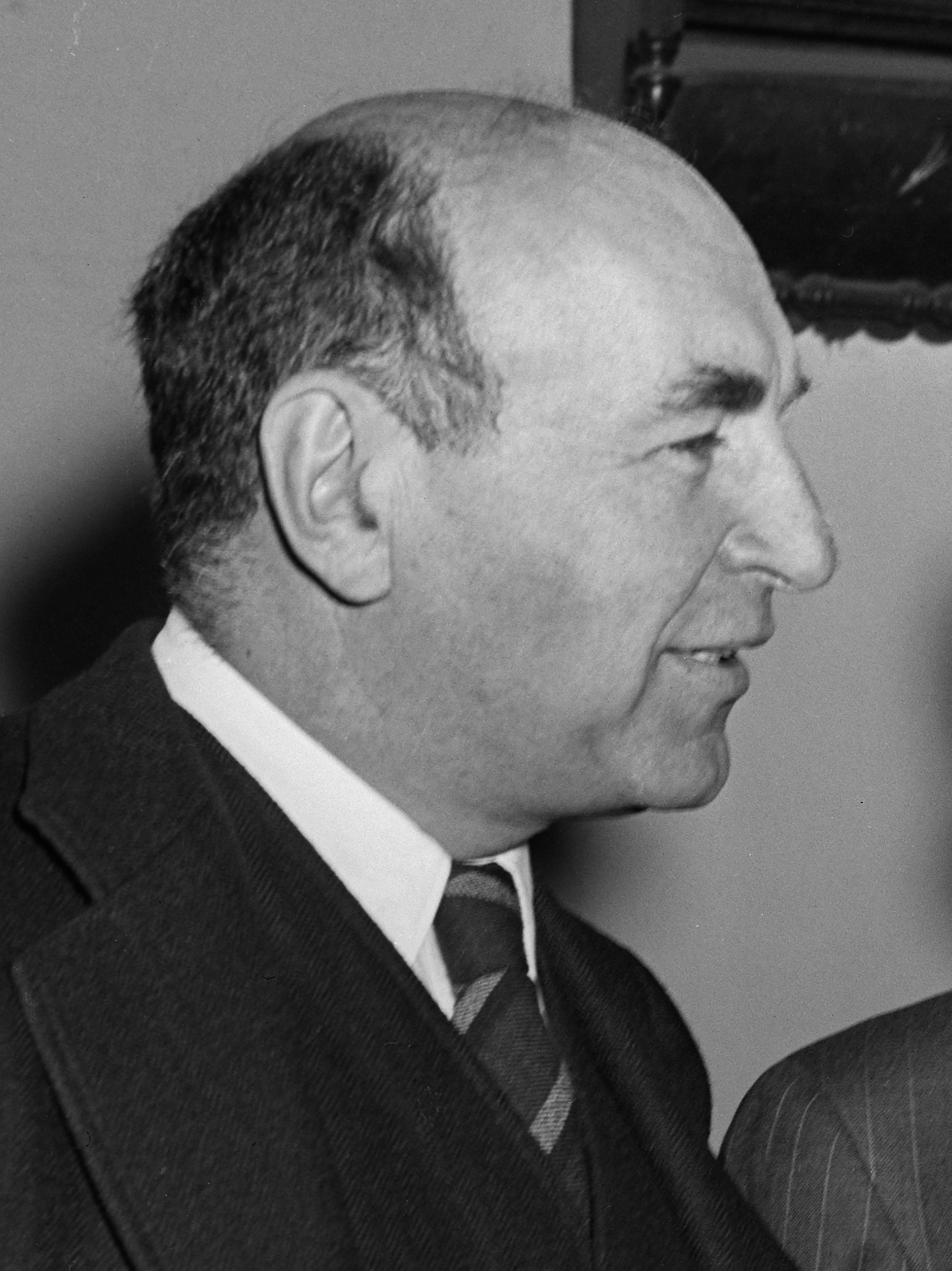
- Fraenkel in 1940
- Born: October 17, 1888; New York City, New York, U.S.
- Died: May 17, 1983 (aged 94); New York City, New York, U.S.
- Education: Harvard College (BA, MA); Columbia Law School (LLB)
- Employer: American Civil Liberties Union
- Spouse: Helene Esberg Fraenkel (m. 1913)
- Children: 3

Osmond Fraenkel (October 17, 1888 – May 17, 1983) was an American attorney who served as general counsel for the American Civil Liberties Union.

== Background ==
Osmond Kessler Fraenkel was born on October 17, 1888, in New York City. His parents were Joseph E. Fraenkel and Emily Kessler.

He attended the Horace Mann School. In 1908, he received a Bachelor of Arts degree magna cum laude as well as a Master of Arts degree from Harvard College. In 1911, he received a Bachelor of laws degree from Columbia Law School.

== Career ==
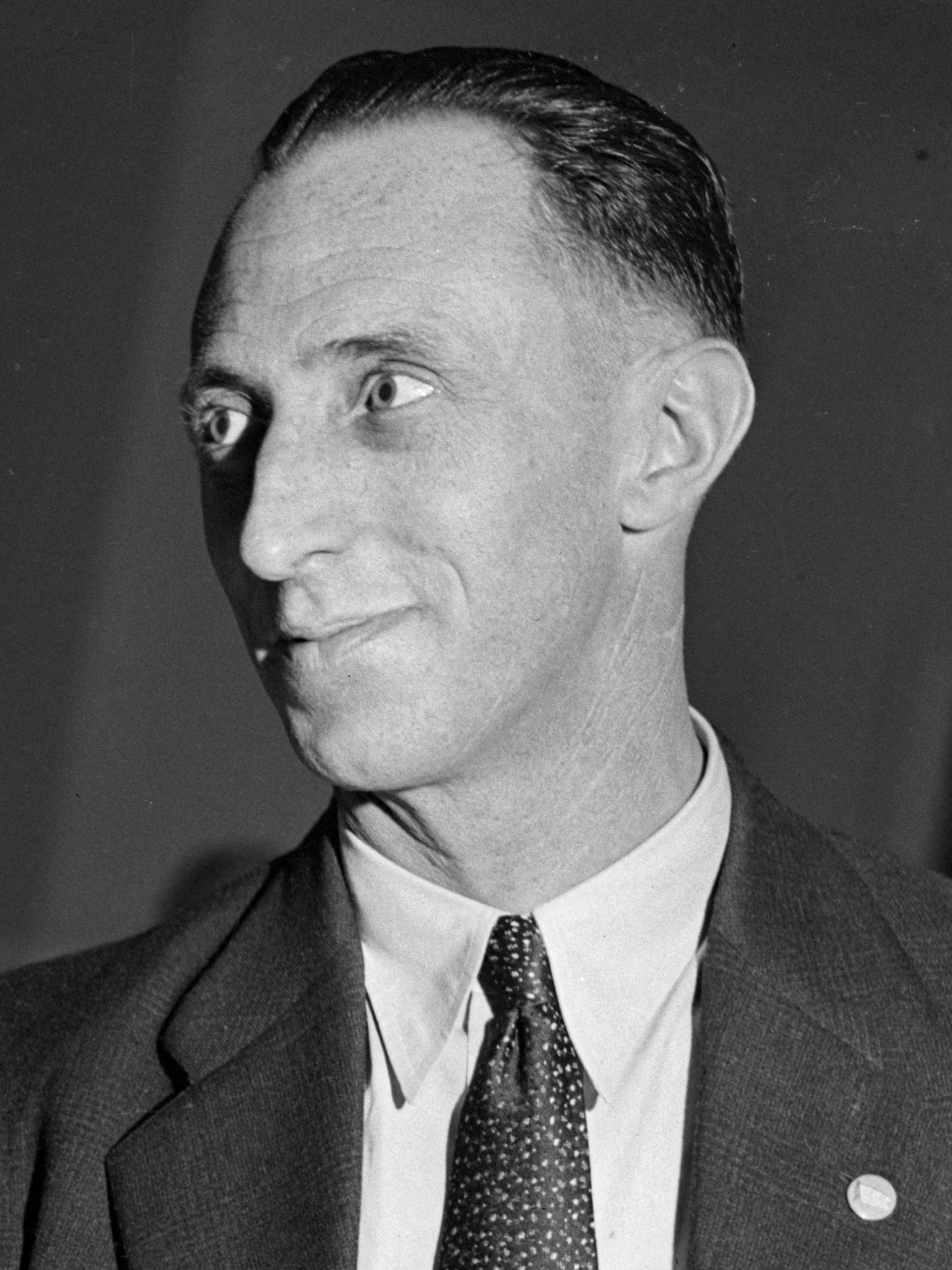
Fraenkel helped defend labor leader Harry Bridges.

In 1910, Fraenkel was admitted to New York State bar. and entered private practice.

=== Private practice ===
In 1916, Fraenkel joined and became a partner in Goldsmith & Fraenkel. In 1928, the firm became Goldsmith, Jackson & Brock through 1942. In 1942, the firm became Fraenkel, Jackson & Levitt through 1945. In 1945, he became counsel to Hays, St. John, Abramson & Schulman, later Hays, St. John, Abramson & Heilbron through 1981. In 1982, he joined Rabinowitz, Boudin, Standard, Krinsky & Lieberman through his death in 1983.

=== Public practice ===
He served co-counsel to the New York Civil Liberties Committee from 1934 (or 1935 ) through 1955, at which time he became general counsel for the American Civil Liberties Union through 1977.

He served as chair of the New York City Welfare Department Hearing Board from 1936 to 1951.

In the 1930s, Fraenkel came to notoriety, first as attorney for the Scottsboro boys, then as attorney for Harry Bridges and Bertrand Russell. In De Jonge v. Oregon he defended a client accused of criminal syndicalism after this person had spoken at a meeting of the communist party.

He defended Consumers Union's pamphlet on contraception from Frank Comerford Walker's opinion that it was obscene.

Other cases argued include:

- 1937: De Jonge v. Oregon
- 1939: Schneider v. State of New Jersey
- 1941: Bridges v. California
- 1958: Trop v. Dulles
- 1967: Turner v. New York (1967)
- 1969: Kramer v. Union Free School District No. 15
- 1974: United States v. Richardson

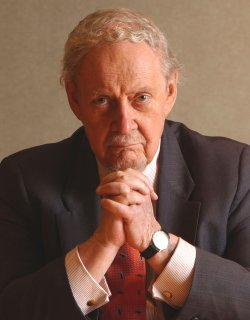
Fraenkel argued his last major case, United States v. Richardson, against Solicitor General Robert H. Bork.

In United States v. Richardson, Fraenkel argued against Solicitor General Robert H. Bork.

He opposed the McCarthyism of Joseph McCarthy. He did legal work for the cases around Japanese American internment, the Pentagon Papers, and school prayer in the United States.

=== National Lawyers Guild ===
Fraenkel was a co-founder of the National Lawyers Guild and was present at pre-formation meeting in New York City on December 1, 1936.

== Personal life and death ==
On December 11, 1913, Fraenkel married Helene Esberg; they had three children: Nancy (Mrs. James A. Wechsler), Carol (Mrs. Mack Lipkin), and George K.

In addition to the National Lawyers Guild, Fraenkel was also a member of Association of the Bar of the City of New York and the American Arbitration Association.

Fraenkel died age 94 on May 17, 1983, in New York City while walking to work.

== Quote ==
- Undated: "People should do whatever they wanted as long as they didn't hurt anyone else." –

== Legacy ==
Norman Dorsen and Ira Glasser called Fraenkel "one of the giants in contemporary life."

== Awards ==
- 1973: Florina Lasker Award from the New York Civil Liberties Union

== Works ==
He authored more than 100 books an articles, including a book on the Sacco and Vanzetti case.

The Library of Congress catalog lists the following works:

- The Sacco-Vanzetti Case (1931, 1969)
- Curse of bigness: miscellaneous papers of Louis D. Brandeis, edited by Osmond K. Fraenkel (1934, 1965)
- Judicial interpretation of labor laws (1939)
- One hundred and fifty years of the Bill of rights (1939, 1941)
- Supreme court and civil liberties: How far has the court protected the Bill of rights? (1941, 1949 1952, 1955, 1960, 1963)
- Our civil liberties (1944, 1969)
  - Bürgerliche Freiheiten; grundrechte und verfassungsmässige Freiheiten in den USA, translated by Otto Schütte (1950)
- Our civil liberties
- Rights we have (1971, 1974)
- Rights you have (1972)

Harvard's catalog on Fraenkel's papers lists three books:

- The Sacco-Vanzetti Case (1931)
- Our Civil Liberties (1945)
- The Supreme Court and Civil Liberties (1966)

== See also ==
- Scottsboro boys
- Harry Bridges
- Bertrand Russell
- Consumers Union
- National Lawyers Guild
- Victor Rabinowitz
- Boudin
