= Paul Frederick Brissenden =

American labor historian (1885–1974)

- Born: September 21, 1885; Benzonia, Michigan, U.S.
- Died: November 29, 1974 (aged 89); San Diego, California, U.S.
- Education: University of California (MA); Columbia Graduate School of Arts and Sciences
- Occupation: Labor historian
- Spouse: Margaret Geer
- Children: 3

Paul Frederick Brissenden (September 21, 1885 – November 29, 1974) was an American labor historian who wrote on various labor issues in the first half of the 20th century. He is perhaps best known for his 1919 work on the Industrial Workers of the World, entitled The IWW: a Study of American Syndicalism.

== Biography ==
Brissenden was born in Benzonia, Michigan, to parents James T. Brissenden and Retta Odell Lewis, both of whom were born in Ohio. His father worked as a farmer. He had two younger brothers, Louis and Richard, and a younger sister, Elizabeth. He earned his Master of Arts at the University of California in 1912, and completed his doctorate in political science at Columbia University in 1917 under supervision of Henry Rogers Seager.

In 1914, Brissenden worked for the U.S. Commission on Industrial Relations. From 1915 to 1920, he worked for the U.S. Bureau of Labor Statistics. He also held position of professor of economics at Columbia University and New York University.

Brissenden was married to Margaret Geer and the father of three sons. He died on November 29, 1974, in San Diego, California.

== Work ==
One of his main works was The IWW: a Study of American Syndicalism, published in 1919, a seminal work on the IWW.

In 1920, he documented labor disputes between miners in Butte and the Anaconda Copper Mining Company.

In 1923 he wrote Justice and the IWW in 1923, in which he criticized the prosecution of I.W.W. members and defended the actions of the IWW members who were imprisoned. He pointed out the prosecutions failure to actually identify the 15,000 alleged deserters, challenged the legality of the evidence seized in raids based on void warrants, and argued that prosecutors lacked sufficient evidence that IWW members had directly obstructed the war, but convicted them on the basis of their association with the IWW. He concludes that members are being imprisoned just for opposing the war.

== Selected publications ==
- 1913, The launching of the Industrial workers of the world.
- 1918, Employment system of the Lake Carriers' Association.
- 1919, The IWW: a Study of American Syndicalism.
- 1919, Employment policies and labor mobility in a California sugar refinery
- 1919, Labor policies and labor turnover in the California oil-refining industry
- 1920. Causes of labor turnover, co-authored with Emil Frankel.
- 1922, Labor Turnover in Industry, a statistical analysis co-authored with Emil Frankel.
- 1923. Justice and the IWW
- 1923. Changes in the purchasing power of manufacturing labor incomes in the United States.
- 1929, Earnings of factory workers, 1899 to 1927.
- 1920. Labor turnover and the federal service.
- 1930, The use of the labor injunction in the New York needle trades.
- 1933, Campaign against the labor injunction.
- 1936, Report of the special commission on wage differentials in the cap and cloth hat industry.
- 1937, The economic condition of the millinery manufacturing industry in the New York Metropolitan Area, 1935-1936.
- 1939, Progress and poverty in millinery manufacturing.
- 1948, Union-management co-operation in millinery manufacturing in the New York metropolitan area.
- 1951, Public policy in collective bargaining.
- 1965, The labor injunction in Hawaii.
- 1965. Settlement of disputes over grievances in the United States : with marginal references to Australia and New Zealand,
- 1965. The challenge of industrial relations in the Pacific-Asian countries, co-edited
- 1966, The settlement of labor disputes on rights in Australia.
