= Ruttenberg =

Ruttenberg may refer to:

- Danya Ruttenberg (born 1975), American rabbi, editor, author
- Derald Ruttenberg (1916-2004), American lawyer who organized industrial mergers
- Harold J. Ruttenberg (1914-1998), American steel union activist, then steel executive
- Joseph Ruttenberg (1889-1983), Russian-born American photojournalist, cinematographer
- Nelson Ruttenberg (1893-1959), American lawyer, politician
- Stanley H. Ruttenberg (1917-2001), American labor activist, Federal government official
