= Meyer Bernstein =

American labor leader and educator (1941-1985)

Meyer Bernstein (1914–1985) was a 20th-Century American labor leader and educator who worked for the Steel Workers Organizing Committee (SWOC), the United Steel Workers of America (USWA), the U.S. Department of Labor, and the United Mine Workers of America (UMW).

== Background ==
Meyer Bernstein was born on March 30, 1914. His parents were Philip Bernstein and Sophie Rubin. He had a brother Jacob and two sisters, Lillian and Jennifer.

In June 1932, he graduated from the Benjamin Franklin Junior-Senior High School in Rochester, New York, where he had managed the School Service Committee and run a newsstand during his senior year. In September 1932, he entered Cornell University on a competitive state scholarship and graduated with a degree in economics in 1936.

== Career ==
In 1936, Bernstein joined the SWOC. In 1937, he helped SWOC in the Little Steel strike, which he described later in his writings. In 1938, Lee Pressman, general counsel of the Congress of Industrial Organizations CIO) as well as of SWOC (a CIO member) sent Bernstein into the field with A. W. Smith, a deputy general counsel to research hiring and firing patterns among "Little Steel." In 1939, he helped Pressman prepare CIO statements. He worked there until 1941 as a research assistant and national representative.

During World War II, he served as U.S. Army Air Corps sergeant.

In 1946, he joined the USWA, became Director of the International Affairs Department, and he worked until 1972. In 1947, Bernstein wrote as an anti-communist against Pressman (amidst a rising tide led by Walter Reuther against pro-communists in the CIO); Pressman resigned shortly thereafter. From 1953 through 1969, his efforts focused on the United Steel Workers International elections.

In 1972, he joined the Labor Department to help observe a rerun of a 1969 United Mine Workers (UMW) election. "He was a union official in District 8 and District 16 of the United Steel Workers." Later in 1972, he became director of the Public and International Affairs Department of the UMW just as Arnold Miller succeeded W. A. Boyle as the union's president. He stayed there into 1973.

United States Department of Labor.

In 1975, he became executive secretary of the Labor Advisory Committee for Trade Negotiations at the Labor Department until retiring in 1982.

== Personal and death ==
At the end of his life, Bernstein lived in Brussels, Belgium.

On December 10, 1985, he drowned near Miami Beach at the age of 71.

== Works ==
After 1945, Berstein's writings focused on Europe.

- The 100 Largest Steel Companies of the Free World (1956)
- The Steelworkers Election, 1965 (1965) (unpublished manuscript)

== See also ==
- Steel Workers Organizing Committee
- United Steel Workers of America
- U.S. Department of Labor
- United Mine Workers of America
- Lee Pressman
- Labor history of the United States

== External sources ==
- Subversive Influence in the Educational Process - US Senate Judiciary Committee: Bernstein for United Public Workers of America (1952)
- Steel Imports - Hearings of the US Senate Finance Committee: Bernstein for United Steel Workers of America (1966)
