= The Color of Truth =

2000 book by Kai Bird

- Author: Kai Bird
- Language: English
- Genre: Non-fiction
- Publisher: Touchstone Books
- Publication date: 2000
- Pages: 298
- ISBN: 978-068-4856-445

The Color of Truth is a book by Kai Bird, published by Touchstone Books in June 2000. Subtitled McGeorge Bundy and William Bundy: Brothers in Arms, it is a biography focusing on the Bundys' role in American foreign policy, especially in the progression of the Vietnam War.

Bird argues evidence presented in The Color of Truth reveals the brothers "registered deep doubts about the American enterprise in Vietnam and did so far earlier than most historians had thought," although they never ceased promoting it during their time with the Kennedy and Johnson administrations. He portrays them as complicated men who served their country, and headed many progressive causes during and after the war, and attributes their refusal to take a hard line against a war they morally opposed to their fear of risking political capital from the anti-communist Vital Center.

== Reception ==
University of Houston–Downtown political scientist James D. Fairbanks, reviewing the book for The Houston Chronicle, called it a "a valuable addition to the literature on the Vietnam War." Writing for the Chicago Tribune, Claude R. Marx found that while the book was "well-researched, well-written", it was "ultimately [an] unsatisfying [work] that often [did] little but restate tired liberal arguments."
