= Portsmouth Steel Company =

- Formerly: Portsmouth Iron & Steel
- Founded: Mid-18th Century
- Defunct: 1950
- Headquarters: Portsmouth, Ohio
- Production output: Steel

The Portsmouth Steel Company, formerly Portsmouth Iron & Steel, AKA Portsmouth Steel Corporation, was a steel manufacturing company based in Portsmouth, Ohio.

== History ==
The town of Portsmouth lies where the Scioto and Ohio rivers in meet. Thanks to iron ore in the foothills of southern Ohio, nearby forests, and the two rivers, made the town an ideal home for blast furnaces. An early site was the Portsmouth Iron Works, operated by Glover, Noel & Company (1831), purchased by Thomas G. Gaylord (1834), who sold to Benjamin B. Gaylord, John P. Gould, and Abram Morrell but still under management by Thomas G. Gaylord & Company. In 1869, Gaylord leased the site to the Portsmouth Iron & Steel Company through 1878. In 1881, the lease resumed to Portsmouth Iron & Steel, which became the Portsmouth Steel Company.

In 1915, the Whitaker-Glessner Company of Wheeling, West Virginia, bought the property of Portsmouth Steel (a former subsidiary) at Portsmouth.

In 1936, Lee Pressman, chief legal counsel of the Congress of Industrial Organizations (CIO) and Steel Workers Organizing Committee (SWOC), visited Portsmouth to help local union members in dispute over the murder of two strikebreakers during a strike.

In 1946, Cyrus Eaton hired 32-year-old Harold J. Ruttenberg (1914–1998), who left the Congress of Industrial Organizations (CIO) and Steel Workers Organizing Committee (SWOC) as vice president in charge of labor relations because he wanted to "make a lot of money." In 1948, Ruttenberg set off an investigation into former CIO and SWOC colleague Lee Pressman. On May 19, 1948, SEC official Anthon H. Lund accused Pressman of interfering in a lawsuit filed against the Kaiser-Frazer car manufacturing company in a Federal District Court in New York City. He specified that between February 3 and 9, 1948, Ruttenberg of Portsmouth Steel Corporation had contacted Pressman for advice on "how to go about filing a stockholder's suite against Kaiser-Frazer." Later in May, during testimony before an SEC board of inquiry, Pressman declared he had "absolutely nothing to do with" the suit. "I have not been requested by anyone to suggest the name of a lawyer who would file a lawsuit against the Kaiser-Frazer Corporation." He stated, "I demand that I be given the opportunity to examine Mr. Lund under oath on the stand to determine who gave him that inaccurate information." The trial's examiner Milton P. Kroll informed Pressman, "You have been given the opportunity to state your position on the record. Your request is denied."

In 1949, Portsmouth Steel settled a labor dispute with the CIO.

In 1950, the Detroit Steel Corporation bought Portsmouth Steel. In 1956, Detroit Steel completed a $150 million modernization program for the plant, including a new coke plant and a steam plant that made use of the waste gas from the blast furnace and coke plant to generate power.

In 1969, Detroit Steel sold the former Portsmouth Steel assets to Cyclops Steel, who in 1972 began to wind down operations at the mill, culminating in a complete shutdown of steelmaking on May 31, 1980, laying off 1,200 employees. The coke plant was sold to McLouth Steel, though when the latter went bankrupt in 1981 the coke plant was divested into an independent entity called New Boston Coke. Over the next decade, most of the former steelmaking facilities would be torn down, remediated, and redeveloped.

A state EPA survey revealed that the emissions from the New Boston Coke plant contained excessively high levels of benzine and butadiene, and filed a lawsuit to force the facility to install a permanent gas flare to burn these agents off. Being financially unable to do so, New Boston Coke shut down in 2002, eliminating 200 jobs. The former coke plant would be torn down in 2007.
