= Stanley Ruttenberg =

American activist and governmental official (1917–2001)

Stanley H. Ruttenberg (March 19, 1917 – March 28, 2001) was an American labor economist, CIO union organizer, director of the research department of the AFL–CIO, and assistant secretary of Labor under U.S. President Lyndon Baines Johnson.

== Background ==
Ruttenberg was born in St. Paul, Minnesota, on March 19, 1917. His brother was Harold J. Ruttenberg. He spent his childhood in Nemacolin, Pennsylvania, and went to school at Massanutten Military Academy, in Woodstock, Virginia. He received a BS from the University of Pittsburgh.

== Career ==
In 1937, Ruttenberg started his 40-year career in labor as an Ohio Valley field representative of the Congress of Industrial Organizations. He served in Cincinnati, Chicago, and other points Midwest. He became assistant to the CIO's director of research, Ralph Hetzel. At some point, he served as an assistant to CIO president John L. Lewis.

Harold J. Ruttenberg, his brother, served as director of research for the Steel Workers Organizing Committee (SWOC). While at the CIO and SWOC, they collaborated on articles. In 1942, the brothers also worked with Hetzel, Lee Pressman, and Vincent Sweeney in writing the initial legal brief to the National War Labor Board (NWLB) for the Little Steel case.

During World War II, he served as a first lieutenant in the U.S. Army on Okinawa and also for the War Manpower Commission.

After the war, he returned to the CIO as an economist. By 1948, he had become the CIO's director of research and education. Around 1953, Ruttenberg seems to have been a member of the League for Industrial Democracy. In mid-1950s, Ruttenberg joined the newly reunited AFL–CIO as chief economist and director of its research department.

In 1962, during the Kennedy Administration, Ruttenberg became special assistant to W. Willard Wirtz, Secretary of the U.S. Department of Labor. He helped redress racial discrimination in state employment offices under Title VI of the Civil Rights Act of 1964 by sending teams to investigate complaints of discrimination around the nation. Advocating voluntary compliance, he made clear his willingness to cut employment service monies to non-compliant states. In 1966, he succeeded Daniel Patrick Moynihan as Assistant Secretary of Labor for Manpower.

In 1969, Ruttenberg left office and established Stanley H. Ruttenberg & Associates, an economic consulting firm, in Washington, D.C. He retired in 1982, though he continued to serve as chairman of the board.

Over his career, he served as director of the National Planning Association, National Bureau of Economic Research, Industrial Relations Research Association, and Resources for the Future.

== Personal and death ==
Ruttenberg married Gertrude Bernstein of Pittsburgh; they met while working for SWOC. They had one daughter and two sons. He died on March 28, 2001, at his home in Bethesda, aged 84, of respiratory failure. Historian Jack Ross is a grandchild.

== Works ==
Books: With Joycelyn Gutchess, Ruttenberg wrote:

- Manpower challenge of the 1970's: institutions and social change. Johns Hopkins Press. 1 March 1970. ISBN 9780801811418.
- Institutions and Social Change
- The Federal-State Employment Service: A Critique. Johns Hopkins University Press. 1970. ISBN 978-0-8018-1228-6. OCLC 877269923.

Articles:

- "AFL-CIO Research: Organization and Operations" (1961)

Articles co-written: Brothers Harold and Stanley co-authored under the CIO aegis on

- "War and the Steel Ghost Towns," Harper's (January 1940)

Pamphlets:

- "World Cooperation for Social Progress" by Ralph J. Bunche, William Green, Paul H. Douglas, Stanley H. Ruttenberg and others (prior to 1953)

== See also ==
- CIO
- AFL–CIO
- U.S. Department of Labor
- Lyndon Baines Johnson

== External sources ==
- CIO and AFL-CIO Research Department, Stanley H. Ruttenberg papers at the University of Maryland libraries.
- "Stanley H. Ruttenberg". JSTOR.
