= Kai Bird =

American author and columnist

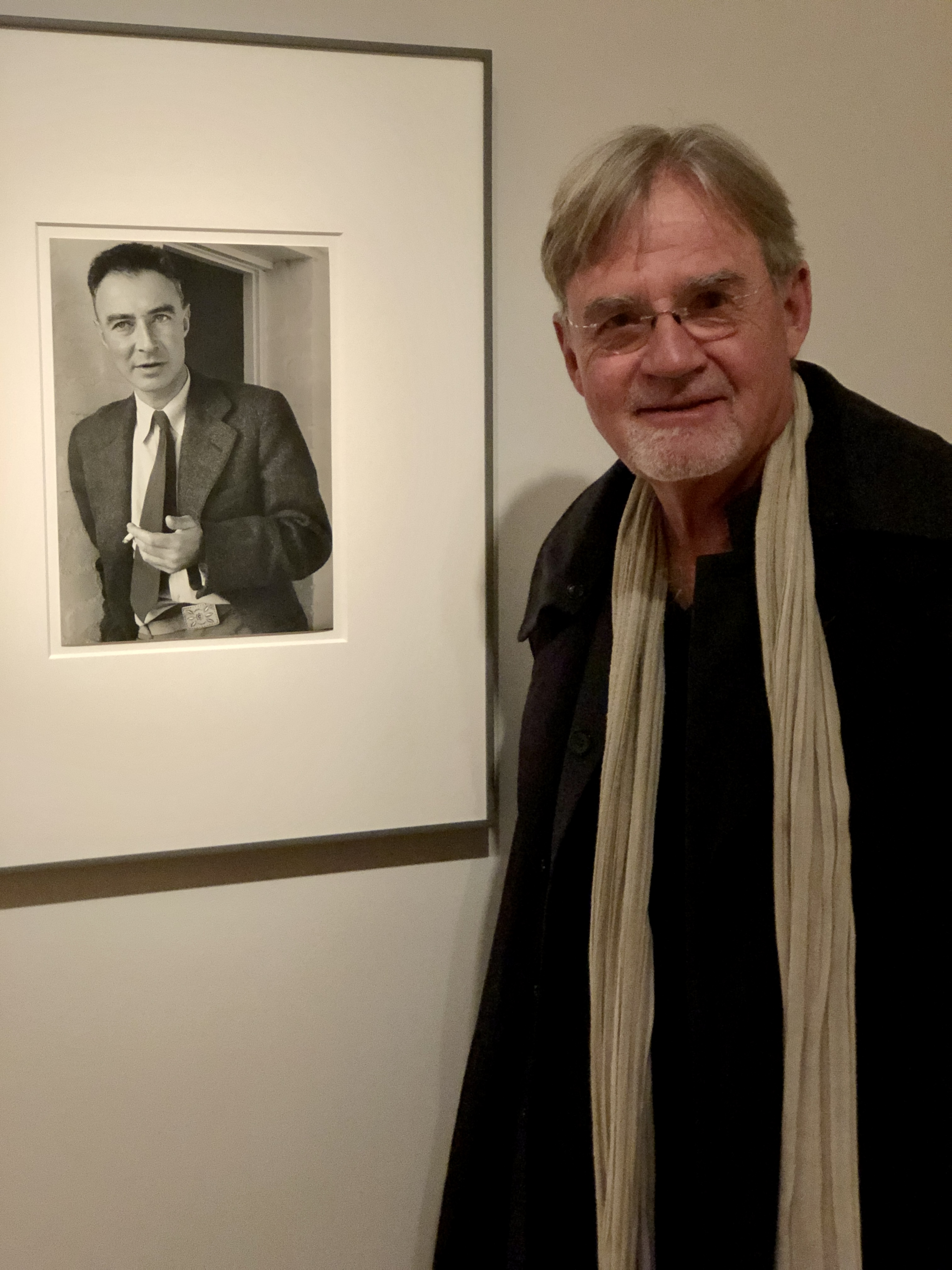
- Kai Bird with portrait of J. Robert Oppenheimer at the National Portrait Gallery
- Born: September 2, 1951 (age 75); Eugene, Oregon, U.S.
- Education: Carleton College (BA); Northwestern University (MS)
- Occupations: Biographer, columnist
- Spouse: Susan Goldmark
- Children: 1
- Website: kaibird.com

Kai Bird (born September 2, 1951) is an American author and columnist, best known for his works on the atomic bombings of Hiroshima and Nagasaki, United States–Middle East political relations, and his biographies of political figures. He won a Pulitzer Prize for American Prometheus: The Triumph and Tragedy of J. Robert Oppenheimer.

== Life ==
Bird was born in 1951 in Eugene, Oregon. His father was a U.S. Foreign Service officer, and Bird spent his childhood in Jerusalem, Beirut, Dhahran, Cairo, and Mumbai. His father named him after Kai-Yu Hsu, a refugee from China he met at the University of Oregon.

Bird finished high school in 1969 at Kodaikanal International School in Tamil Nadu, South India. He received his BA in history from Carleton College in 1973 and an MS in journalism from Northwestern University in 1975. Bird now lives in New York City with his wife, Susan Goldmark, a retired country director at the World Bank. They have a son, Joshua.

In January 2017, Bird was appointed executive director and distinguished lecturer at the Leon Levy Center for Biography, located at the CUNY Graduate Center in New York City.

== Literary career ==
After graduating from Carleton, Bird received a Thomas J. Watson Fellowship, which enables students to do a year of independent study outside the United States. He used the fellowship to do a photojournalism project in Yemen. Two years later, his wife Goldmark was also awarded a Watson Fellowship, and the two of them spent fifteen months as freelance journalists traveling through Bangladesh, India, and Pakistan. "We filed weekly stories with papers like the Christian Science Monitor and Hong Kong's Far Eastern Economic Review," Bird said. "We hardly made any money, but we enjoyed what we were doing." Bird was an associate editor of The Nation magazine from 1978 to 1982 and then a columnist for the magazine.

== Published works ==
Bird's biographical works include The Color of Truth: McGeorge Bundy and William Bundy, Brothers in Arms (Touchstone, 1998); The Chairman: John J. McCloy and the Making of the American Establishment (Random House, 1992); and Hiroshima's Shadow: Writings on the Denial of History and the Smithsonian Controversy (1998), which he co-edited with Lawrence Lifschultz.

In April 2010 his book Crossing Mandelbaum Gate: Coming of Age Between the Arabs and Israelis, 1956–1978 was released by Scribner. It is a meld of memoir and history, fusing his early life in the Arab world with an account of the American experience in the Middle East.

The Good Spy: The Life and Death of Robert Ames (Crown, 2014) is a biography of CIA officer Robert Ames, whose career focus was the Middle East. According to the book, Ames played a key role in starting the peace process that led to the Oslo accords between Israel and the PLO. Ames perished in the April 18, 1983, truck bombing of the American embassy in Beirut.

In 2021, he published a biography of Jimmy Carter entitled The Outlier: The Unfinished Presidency of Jimmy Carter.

In 2026, Bird and his wife Susan Goldmark published a biography of Roy Cohn, titled American Scoundrel: Roy Cohn's Dark Journey from Joe McCarthy to Donald Trump.

=== Articles ===
- Kai Bird with Susan Goldmark, "The Mentor: How Roy Cohn taught Donald Trump everything," The New Yorker, 10 August 2026, pp. 38–47.

== Awards ==
Bird is a recipient of a Thomas J. Watson Fellowship (1973), an Alicia Patterson Journalism Fellowship (1981), a Guggenheim Fellowship (1984), and a John D. & Catherine T. MacArthur Grant for Research and Writing (1993–95). In 2001-2002 he was a fellow at the Woodrow Wilson International Center for Scholars. Bird and co-author Martin J. Sherwin won the 2006 Pulitzer Prize for Biography or Autobiography for American Prometheus: The Triumph and Tragedy of J. Robert Oppenheimer (Knopf, 2005). He and Sherwin also won the 2005 National Book Critics Circle Award for their biography of J. Robert Oppenheimer. In 2008, they also won the Duff Cooper Prize.

Crossing Mandelbaum Gate was a finalist for the 2010 National Book Critics Circle Award in the "Autobiography" category.

In September 2016, he was the featured speaker at Carleton College's opening convocation in Northfield, Minnesota.
