= Harold J. Ruttenberg =

American activist and businessman (1914–1998)

Harold J. Ruttenberg (May 22, 1914 – August 15, 1998) was an American labor activist for the Congress of Industrial Organizations's Steel Workers Organizing Committee (SWOC) and later United Steel Workers of America (USWA), who in 1946 left labor for management and became an "outspoken" business executive in the steel industry.

== Background ==
Harold J. Ruttenberg was born on May 22, 1914, in St. Paul, Minnesota. He had a younger brother, Stanley. He spent his childhood in Greene County, Pennsylvania, where his father owned grocery stores.

In 1935, he received a bachelor's degree in Sociology and Economics from the University of Pittsburgh.

== Career ==
=== Steel union years ===
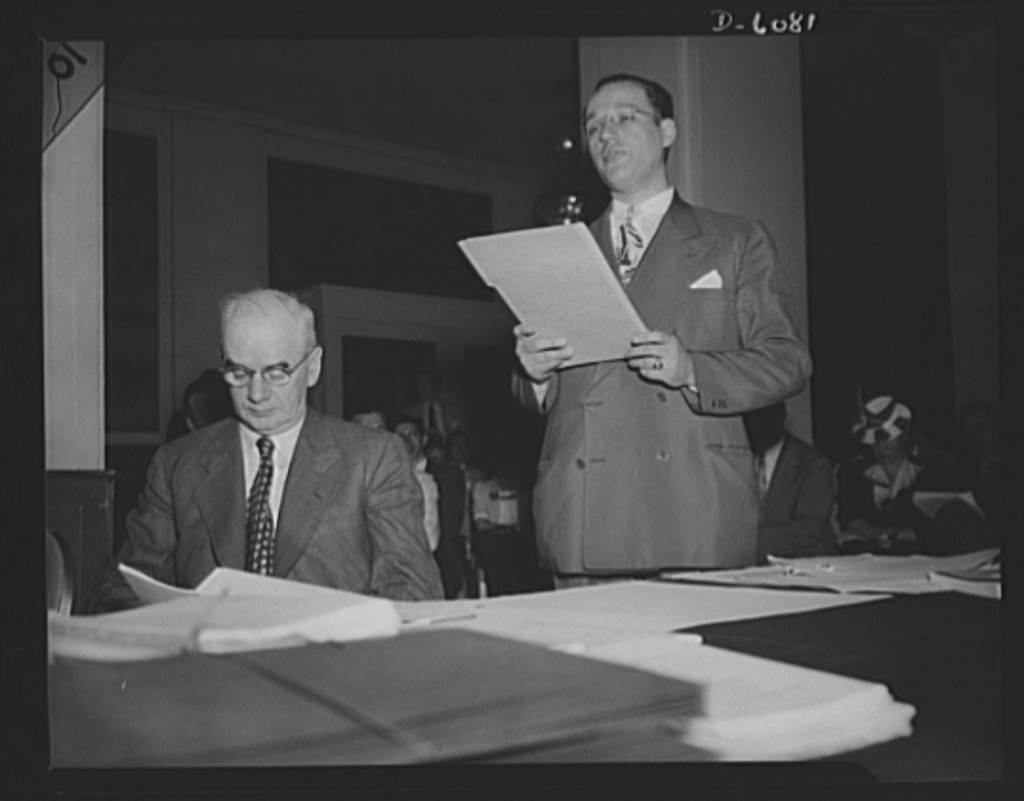
Ruttenberg, as research director for United Steel Workers, speaking at the "Little Steel" hearing before the National War Labor Board in Washington, D.C., in 1942

While a student, he served as investigator on the U.S. Senate's Special Committee on Investigation of the Munitions Industry, AKA the "Nye Committee" (where Alger Hiss served as counsel). The Nye Committee assigned him to work at Federal Laboratories in Pittsburgh; this organization provided munitions to steel companies and to both warring factions in Cuba. He also helped Caroll Dougherty, Economics professor, research material for Brookings Institution publications, through which he became interested in the Amalgamated Iron and Steel Workers Union (AKA Amalgamated Association of Iron and Steel Workers or "AA").

He then worked for the Pennsylvania Security League and the Congress of Industrial Organizations (CIO), which formed in 1936.

Ruttenberg became regional research director of the Pittsburgh for the Steel Workers Organization Committee (SWOC), itself created by the Congress of Industrial Organizations (CIO). He and brother Stanley collaborated on articles. In 1942, the brothers also worked with Hetzel, Lee Pressman, and Vincent Sweeney in writing the initial legal brief to the National War Labor Board (NWLB) for the Little Steel strike.

In 1938 and again from 1942 to 1944 during World War II, he served as assistant director for steel in the War Production Board, which included the "Steel for Victory" drive in Pittsburgh (Summer 1943). By 1946, he had added chair of the CIO's wage research committee to USWA research director. The committee challenged U.S. Bureau of Labor Statistics figures on fallen labor productivity 1939–1944, used by industry to justify refusals to grant adequate wage increases.

=== Split ===
In his obituary, the New York Times summarized a 1971 letter he had written that explained his decision to leave the labor movement and move to industry:

He said that the leadership of the steelworkers' union had let him and two others resign from the union rather than have the union agree to pursue a policy that the three "had advocated of assuming responsibility along with management for increasing productivity as employment benefits increased so that the union could restrain steel price increases." He recalled that both the union and the management sides had refused to do that in 1945 and 1946.

He left the union when the USWA failed to implement his policy recommendations on wages.

=== Steel industry years ===
In 1946, Cyrus Eaton hired Ruttenberg for the Portsmouth Steel Company as vice president in charge of labor relations because he wanted to "make a lot of money.". In 1949, he left Portsmouth to head Stardrill-Keystone Drilling Machine Company, Humanation Associates, and United Steel and Wire Company. His specialty was to rescue companies in financial difficulty. In 1948, Ruttenberg set off an investigation into former CIO and SWOC colleague Lee Pressman. On May 19, 1948, Securities and Exchange Commission official Anthon H. Lund accused Pressman of interfering in a lawsuit filed against the Kaiser-Frazer car manufacturing company in a Federal District Court in New York City. He specified that between February 3 and 9, 1948, Ruttenberg, then vice president of Portsmouth Steel Corporation, had contacted Pressman for advice on "how to go about filing a stockholder's suite against Kaiser-Frazer." Later in May, during testimony before an SEC board of inquiry, Pressman declared he had "absolutely nothing to do with" the suit. "I have not been requested by anyone to suggest the name of a lawyer who would file a lawsuit against the Kaiser-Frazer Corporation." He stated, "I demand that I be given the opportunity to examine Mr. Lund under oath on the stand to determine who gave him that inaccurate information." The trial's examiner Milton P. Kroll informed Pressman, "You have been given the opportunity to state your position on the record. Your request is denied."

In 1958, Ruttenberg said in speech that steelworkers needed "steady jobs with 52 regular pay checks a year" over higher hourly wages. He also criticized David J. McDonald, USWA president, for "sidetracking the dynamic concept of the annual wage" and for resisting ties between wage increases and heightened industrial efficiency. He also criticized steel executives for lack of leadership.

In 1968, in the aftermath of the 1967 Arab-Israeli War, he served as chairman of Rehovoth Instruments Company in Israel through 1978.

In 1973, he became chairman and chief executive the AVM Corporation, where he remained until his death in 1998 (by which time AVM Corporation had become known as the American Locker Group, Inc., manufacturer and distributor of coin-operated metal lockers and plastic security mail boxes).

== Personal and death ==
About 1936, Ruttenberg married Katherine Monori (1914–2002). They had four children.

In 1968, the Ruttenbergs lived part-time in Israel through 1993.

He died age 84 at home on August 15, 1998, in Pittsburgh of heart failure.

== Legacy ==
In 1958, the New York Herald Tribune called Ruttenberg "the brilliant research director and economic wizard for the United Steel Workers and the righthand man of Philip Murray," USWA and CIO president.

The New York Times eulogized him, stating "In his years in the labor world and in management, Mr. Ruttenberg was a perennial advocate of improving ties between the two sides."

Lynn R. Williams cited The Dynamics of Industrial Democracy (1942) by Ruttenberg and Clinton S. Golden as a major inspiration to his own work and career.

== Works ==
- The Strategy of Industrial Peace (1939)
- "War and the Steel Ghost Towns," Harper's with Stanley H. Ruttenberg (January 1940)
- The Dynamics of Industrial Democracy with Clinton S. Golden (1942)
- Self-Developing America (1960)
- My Life in Steel: From CIO to CEO (2001)

== See also ==
- Stanley H. Ruttenberg
- Congress of Industrial Organizations
- Steel Workers Organizing Committee
- United Steel Workers of America
- Nye Committee
- Little Steel strike
- Lee Pressman

== External sources ==
- Rauh Jewish Archives: Photo of Harold J. Ruttenberg (undated)
- Penn State University: Harold J. Ruttenberg papers, 1933–1967
- Archives.org: 1960 letter from Allen W. Dulles to Ruttenberg
- EDGAR Online: American Locker Group Inc: ALGI (OTC)
