= A. W. Smith =

English market gardener

Alfred William Smith (A. W. Smith; 1855–1927), also known as "The Cabbage King", was one of the most successful market gardeners working in South West Middlesex, England in the 19th and 20th centuries. Smith was born in Putney in 1855 but lived most of his life in Feltham until his death in 1927. Smith was remembered by one of his foremen, Alfred Lucas:

"He was a man of extreme modesty, was deeply but silently religious, did not drink or smoke and I never heard him use a profane expression during the whole 14 years I was in his service. He told me he never had time to read a book. He had no holiday when I was with him and he was absent only 3 months when he had a severe breakdown and fear was entertained for his life."

Lucas, as the man who spent much time working with Smith, is the main source of information relating to Smith.

== Career ==
=== Humble beginnings ===
In 1890, Smith began his empire with a modest 40 acre fruit garden (Feltham Glebeland) that faced Staines Road in Bedfont, a single horse, and a few secondhand tools. When Lucas joined the operation around 1890 Smith only had four employees: Tom Witt, Bob Jackson, Tommy Day, and Polly Jackson. After successfully cultivating this garden for some time, Smith expanded his reach by taking over another 40 acres on the Walton Road; this became known as No. 2 Garden. This time Smith chose to plant half the field with fruit trees and half with brussels sprouts, onions, beetroots, and cabbages. Smith's empire continued to expand with 30 more acres, new employees, and new horses and materials. A dramatic new chapter began in Smith's life with the retirement of his father, Henry Smith, in 1891.

=== The rise of an empire ===
After taking over his father's business, A. W. Smith continued to expand his business even further. As he entered this new chapter of business Smith added another crop to his stock: tomatoes. To houses these plants, he built five large glass houses (250 feet long by 15 feet wide), predecessor to modern greenhouses, along the Feltham Hill road towards Sunbury. Since these houses were built on land previously used for cereal crops, Smith had to make a few changes; he dug a five foot deep four foot wide passage to allow water to get into the houses. This new crop proved to be wildly successful, so Smith proceeded to build seven larger glasshouses (250 ft. by 30 ft.). To cope with the water problem for these houses, Smith built a brick water tower nearby. These additions of land and crops required new additions as well; Smith acquired more horses, employees, and tools. This growth in horses depended upon for work led to some troubles as they often needed to be shoed, which could take valuable time, so Smith created his own blacksmith's forge on his property. No longer limited by this, Smith continued to expand his landholdings and stables, acquiring many more horses for work.

The next notable direction Smith took his business in was when he purchased about 45 acres of land just off of Feltham High Street. While this seems simple, it is notable because the land was not incredibly well suited or farming; however, Smith had other plans. He ordered the construction of 20 glasshouses, the largest yet at 600 ft. by 32 ft. to be populated with tomatoes. This massive sea of glass, incredibly expensive at the time, cost £13,500 and came to be known as The Glass City. Unfortunately, the site of the city would prove to cause trouble later on as the plants did not yield as much as planned; several solutions were attempted, including individually potting the 200,000 plants, but none completely solved the problem. Despite this, Smith chose to move his headquarters from Feltham Hill to this new site of Feltham Farm in the year 1899. Smith personally financed and constructed a new complex including a blacksmith's forge, wheelwright, office, and more.

This establishment of the new base of operations proved to be advantageous to Smith as his father's lease on a significant portion of land came to a close and was snatched up by his elder brother E.F. Smith. This land included the former headquarters of the group at Feltham Hill as well as Smith's own residence at Burnham Villa. While it was a huge blow to Smith's morale this event proved to be nothing he could not handle; the loss of some fields was overcome, and he found a new residence in Feltham House.

Smith made up for the 40 acres he lost to his brother by purchasing another 70 acres in Ashford. When showed this land, Lucas points out that it was very far from a point at which it could be useful to a gardener, but Smith was not to be stopped. So, teams began to work the field and make it ready for fruit trees, but a snag arose when one plow broke on a large, mushroom-shaped piece of ironstone (about 20 ft. in diameter). Even when it was revealed that this land was dotted heavily with these ironstone protrusions, Smith refused to be daunted; he ordered men to hand-drill holes in all the stones large enough to fit a parcel of gunpowder. Smith then blasted each chunk of ironstone until he had enough surface room to grow the trees, about 3 ft. of dirt was needed. However, Smith wanted to test the land with a crop of brussels sprouts first, so once the field was fully worked this crop would ensure the ground was properly cleaned for the more costly fruit trees.

Smith's empire began to take its final form with two noteworthy acquisitions of land. The first belonged to a Mr. Batson and was approximately 200 acres in close proximity to Smith's already established holdings. Naturally, when Batson approached Smith with an offer to sell his land, Smith quickly accepted, thereby closing off the territory and extending his reach far into Feltham. The second piece of land was about 300 acres controlled by a Mr. Hatch who, when Smith approached at the end of his lease, agreed to turn the land over to Smith. While both of these land acquisitions required varying degrees of work to get ready for Smith's plans, it was well worth it to establish his over 900 acre empire.

=== The workers ===
Due to the extreme size of his operation, Smith hired large numbers of workers for various tasks, all of which were paid quite fairly for their work. Some of the tasks taken by men were Foremen, Blacksmith, Wheelwright, repairman for glasshouses, diggers, plow workers, pieceworkers, and more. The women were employed in tasks such as weeding, hoeing, planting, and harvesting fruit. A number of Show Travelers were also employed when they came to Feltham; they were given some of the harder tasks of picking more difficult crops, thereby relieving some of the women of this stress. Even so, there was a moment when the women felt unfairly paid at work and attempted a strike; however, Lucas was able to settle the matter without loss of productivity. The most interesting aspect was Smith's hiring policy. He was willing to hire anyone, man or woman, who could put in an honest day's hard work, regardless of their background. Previous convicts were hired right alongside poor widows trying to get by.

=== The workplace environment ===
As was to be expected from his upbringing, Smith entertained specific expectations for his workers. He was never late and would reprimand workers who were late or tried to leave the job early, often outright firing the offender. He specified rules and fines regarding any avoidable problems such as careless destruction of plants, eating product, and so on, but was still seen as a benevolent employer due to his wish to keep those who needed work employed. Smith also took care of his workers, stopping and resolving feuds before they could grow further. Smith also defended his land within his rights; he employed a few people to guard the land at night and keep any poachers or thieves at bay.

Besides ensuring security, Smith also ensured quality. He developed a special version of hoe specifically for cutting lettuce that did not require the user to constantly bend to the ground; this allowed one man to much more quickly cut the lettuce while two or three others picked it up after him. This maintained a single standard of quality since only the one man would choose which heads of lettuce were suitable for cutting. Beyond this, Smith outlined several specific procedures for weeding, digging, picking, and packing. Thus he ensured all the produce bearing his name was up to his high standards and packed perfectly for the journey to market.

=== Crops of "The Cabbage King" ===
As is expected, Smith was very specific with picking what varieties of crops he grew. He grew a number of fruits: apples, both the kind for eating and for cooking, plums, pears, gooseberries, currants, raspberries, strawberries, and cherries. Inside his famous glasshouses, Smith also grew tomato plants. These plants produced on average 4 pounds of tomatoes per plant. Smith also grew mint, both within the glasshouses and without. During various months, he was also a key supplier of parsley, spring onions, leeks, and root crops: potatoes, Jerusalem artichokes, mangold worzel (mangelwurzel), turnips, parsnips, and beetroot. Smith also grew several varieties of beans (runner, broad, and longpod) and peas throughout the season. Smith also grew smaller quantities of large onions, marrows, and rhubarb. In all, the glasshouses alone produced somewhere around 200 tons of food per year while employing about 40 workers.

But the most notable of Smith's crops were his greens. He was a grower that was able to constantly be shipping greens to market throughout the year: spinach in spring, cauliflower and brussels sprouts in summer until mid Autumn, savoy cabbage in late Autumn throughout the winter, and after Christmas until the following April, kale and broccoli. His long cabbage season caused by the adeptness with which the land grew cabbages was what earned Smith the nickname of "The Cabbage King" amongst vendors in Covent Garden and locals of Feltham. Most notably, Smith produced one million cabbages in a single season. He very specifically chose the varieties best suited for glasshouses as well as outdoor growing in the later months.

Smith also grew lilies for a time, on the advice of his brother E.F. Smith. Starting with a small trial venture, Smith was quite satisfied with the product and the money it brought in during the winter months, so he moved to a larger venture and constructed two glasshouses specifically for lilies. However, the large number of lilies produced by the Smith brothers drove the market price of the lilies down that year and Lucas reports Smith had a net loss of £500; Smith thus abandoned lilies and turned these two houses over to cucumbers. Besides this failed venture, Smith also grew wallflowers, forget-me-nots, honesty, and violets.

Managing this vast array of plants required a large amount of fertilizer, namely manure. Originally, Smith used a number of carts to ferry manure to Feltham from London; however, as his holdings grew and technology progressed, he chose to try a more efficient method. Smith obtained permission to build a railway leading to his farm and purchased three rail carts to carry manure as well as his own driving engine. This allowed for workers previously engaged in moving manure to spend their time elsewhere, thus creating more efficiency.

== Politics ==
The passing of the Local Government Act 1894 caused a rift in Feltham; the once united town began to divide over the issues it raised. At this time Smith was approached by some fellow community members and was encouraged to run, so he did in order to maintain the current rates on property. He was elected with a majority to be chairman of the first parish council of Feltham; however, he only attended one meeting after which he declared public life was too slow for him. He remained nominal chair and a co-chair was elected by the rest of the group.

== The end of the story ==
Smith continued work in much the same manner for a number of years. He acquired more land in several different purchases as late as 1920. He worked tirelessly until his death in 1927 caused by heat failure after a bout with influenza at 71. He is buried in Feltham cemetery.
