= Lee Pressman =

American lawyer (1906–1969)

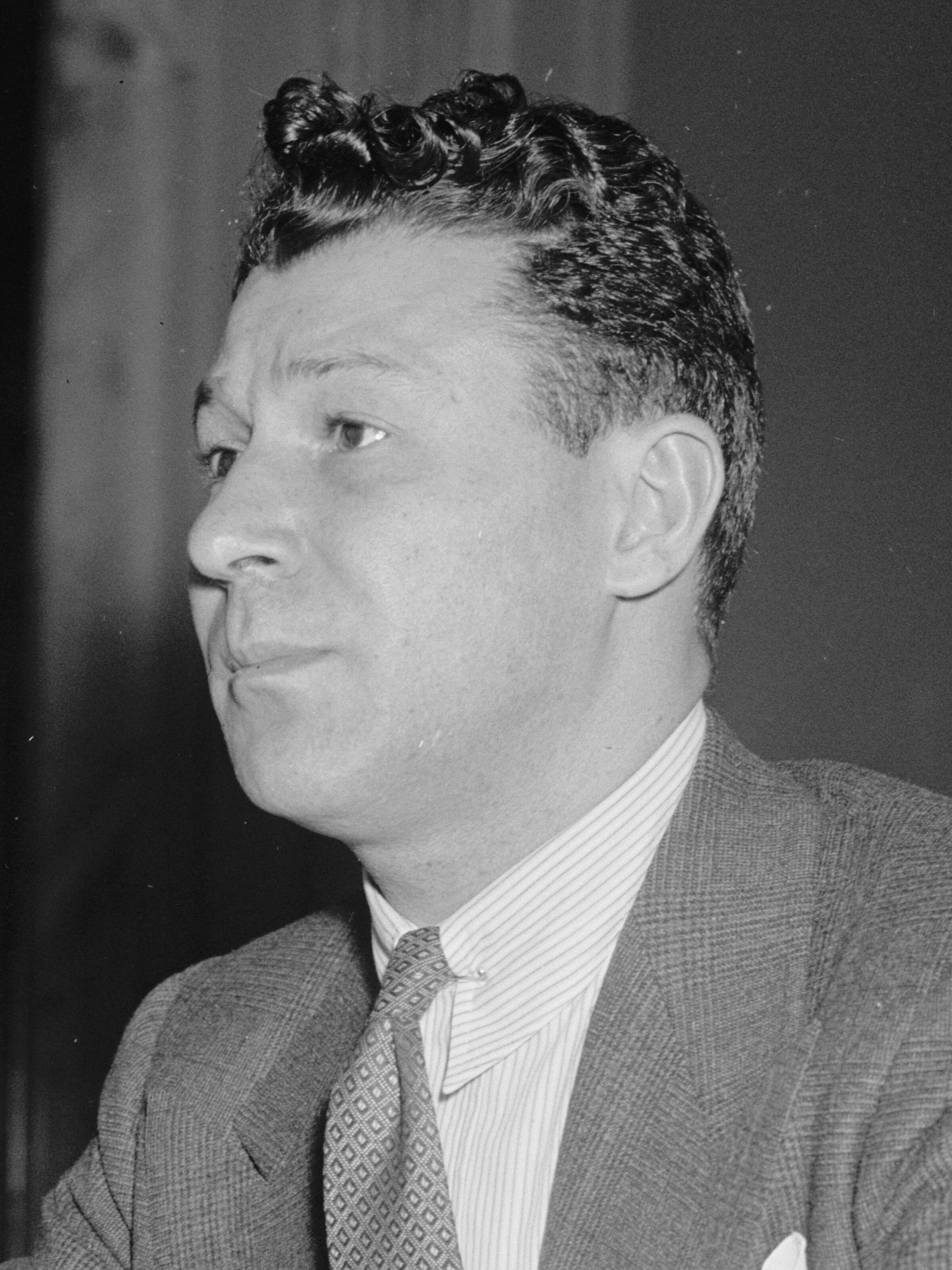
- Pressman testifies before the Senate Committee on Education and Labor, 1938
- Born: Leon Pressman; July 1, 1906; New York City, U.S.
- Died: November 20, 1969 (aged 63); Mount Vernon, New York, U.S.
- Other names: "Vig" (VENONA), "Comrade Big" (anti-communists)
- Education: Cornell University (B.A., 1926); Harvard Law School (J.D., 1929)
- Employer(s): Chadbourne, Stanchfield & Levy, AAA, WPA, Resettlement Administration, CIO, Progressive Party
- Known for: Membership in Ware Group, IJA, NLG
- Notable work: CIO union collective bargaining
- Political party: Communist; American Labor
- Spouse: Sophia Platnik
- Children: Anne Pressman, Susan Pressman, Marcia Pressman
- Parent(s): Harry Pressman, Clara Pressman
- Relatives: Irving Pressman (brother)

Lee Pressman (July 1, 1906 – November 20, 1969) was a labor attorney and earlier a US government functionary, publicly alleged in 1948 to have been a spy for Soviet intelligence during the mid-1930s (as a member of the Ware Group), following his recent departure from Congress of Industrial Organizations (CIO) as a result of its purge of Communist Party members and fellow travelers. From 1936 to 1948, he represented the CIO and member unions in landmark collective bargaining deals with major corporations including General Motors and U.S. Steel. According to journalist Murray Kempton, anti-communists referred to him as "Comrade Big."

== Background ==
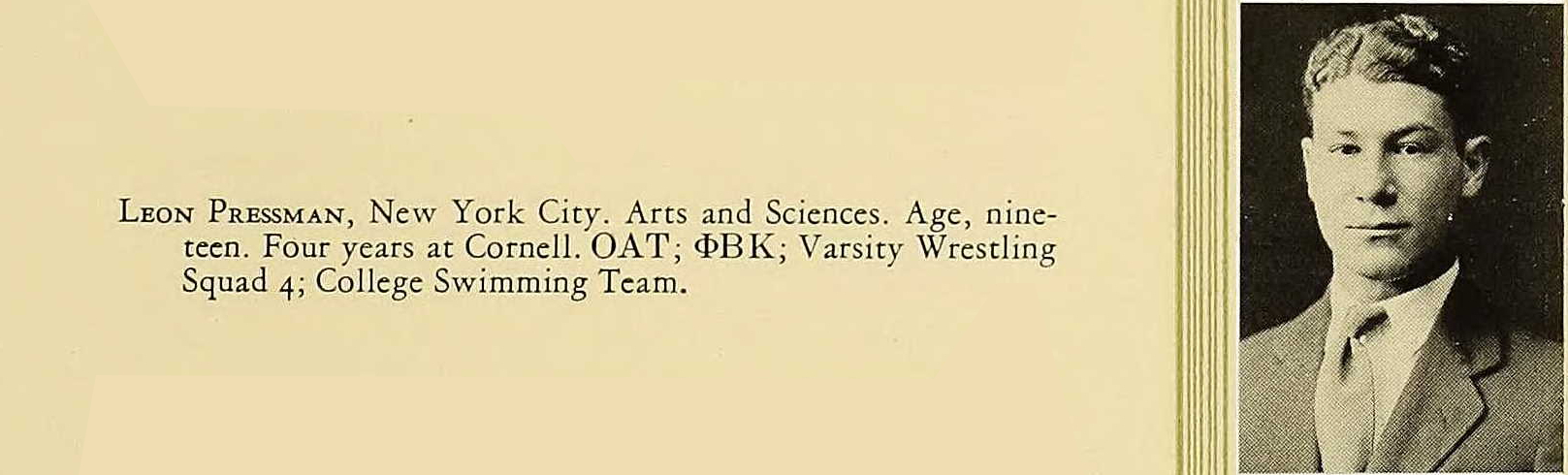
Pressman in the Cornell University yearbook, 1926

Pressman was born Leon Pressman on July 1, 1906, on the Lower East Side of in New York City, first of two sons of immigrants Harry and Clara Pressman of Minsk. His father was a milliner on the Lower East Side of New York City. As a child, Leon survived polio. In his teens, the family moved out to the Bensonhurst section of Brooklyn. In 1922, he entered Washington Square College of New York University, where classmates included Nathan Witt and possibly Charles Kramer (later, fellow AAA and Ware Group members), then transferred to Cornell University, where he studied under labor economist Sumner Slichter.

In 1926, Pressman received his bachelor's degree from Cornell University in Ithaca, New York. In 1929, he received a Juris Doctor degree from Harvard Law School. At Harvard, he was a member of Phi Beta Kappa and was in the same class as Alger Hiss. With future defending lawyer Edward Cochrane McLean, they served on the Harvard Law Review:

Mr. Hiss: ... Lee Pressman was in my class at the Harvard Law School, and we were both on the Harvard Law Review at the same time.

== Career ==
After graduation, he joined the law firm of Chadbourne, Stanchfield & Levy (currently Chadbourne & Parke) in New York City. (During the Great Depression, founder Thomas Chadbourne asserted that the capitalist system itself was "on trial" and became an early champion of both collective bargaining rights and profit sharing for workers.) There, he worked for Jerome Frank (future chair of the SEC). When Jerome left in 1933 to work in FDR's New Deal, Pressman joined a small firm called Liebman, Blumenthal & Levy, to handle Jerome's clients.

=== New Deal service 1933–1936 ===
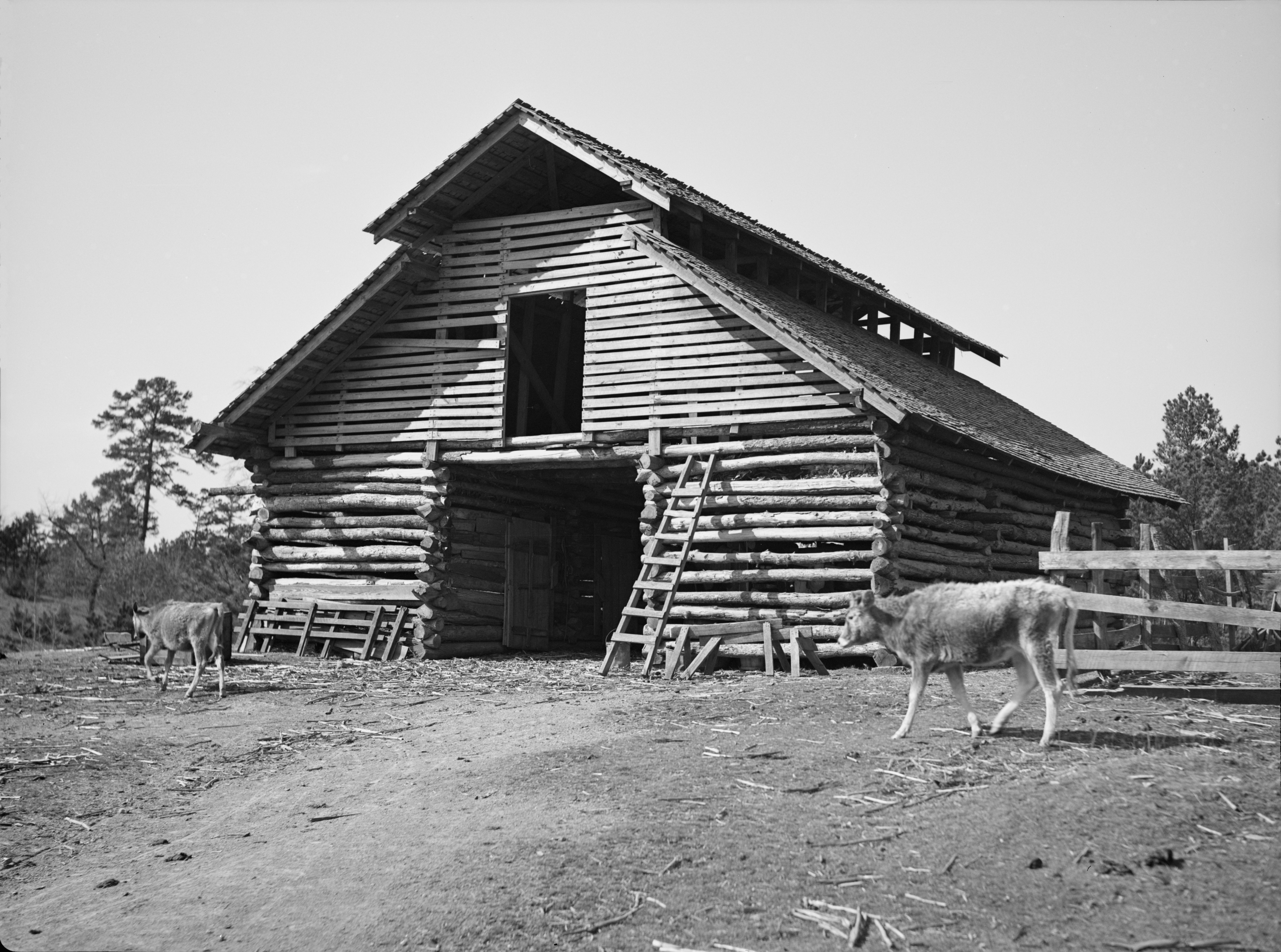
Barn on tenant's farm in Walker County, Alabama, a symbol of AAA efforts, 1937

In 1933, Pressman joined the Ware Group at the invitation of Harold Ware, a Communist agricultural journalist in Washington, DC: "I was asked to join by a man named Harold Ware" (See "Ware Group" sub-section, below)

==== AAA ====
In July 1933, Pressman received appointment as assistant general counsel of the Agricultural Adjustment Administration (AAA) by Secretary of Agriculture Henry A. Wallace. He reported to Jerome Frank, who was general counsel. The New Dealers saw the AAA as complementing the National Recovery Act (NRA – where fellow Ware Group member and lifelong Hiss friend Henry Collins worked). As they arrived at AAA, two camps quickly arose: previously existing officials who favored agribusiness interests and New Deal appointees who sought to protect small farmers (and farm laborers) and consumers as much as agribusiness. Or, as Arthur M. Schlesinger, Jr. summarized the attitude, "There were too many Ivy League men, too many intellectuals, too many radicals, too many Jews." By December 1933, Frank had hired John Abt and Arthur (or Howard) Bachrach (brother of Abt's sister Marion Abt Bachrach) to develop litigation strategies for agricultural reform policies.

In February 1935, Chester Davis fired many of Frank's cadre, including Pressman, Frank, Gardner Jackson, and two others.

==== WPA, RA ====
By April 1935, Pressman had been appointed general counsel in the Works Progress Administration by Harry L. Hopkins. A joint resolution dated January 21, 1935, called the Emergency Relief Appropriation Act of 1935, passed in the United States Congress and became law on April 8, 1935. As a result, on May 6, 1935, FDR issued Executive Order 7034, that essentially transformed the Federal Emergency Relief Administration into the Works Progress Administration. "Pressman set to work analyzing the budget request that would transform FERA into the WPA."

By mid-summer 1935, Rexford G. Tugwell appointed him general counsel of the Resettlement Administration. Pressman split his time between the two agencies. However, by year's end (he recollected in a letter to Tugwell in 1937), he came to believe that New Deals changes occurred only when "major controlling financial interests" concurred or when "financial interests had been able to seize effective control of the code and manipulate it to enhance their power."

=== CIO 1936–1948 ===
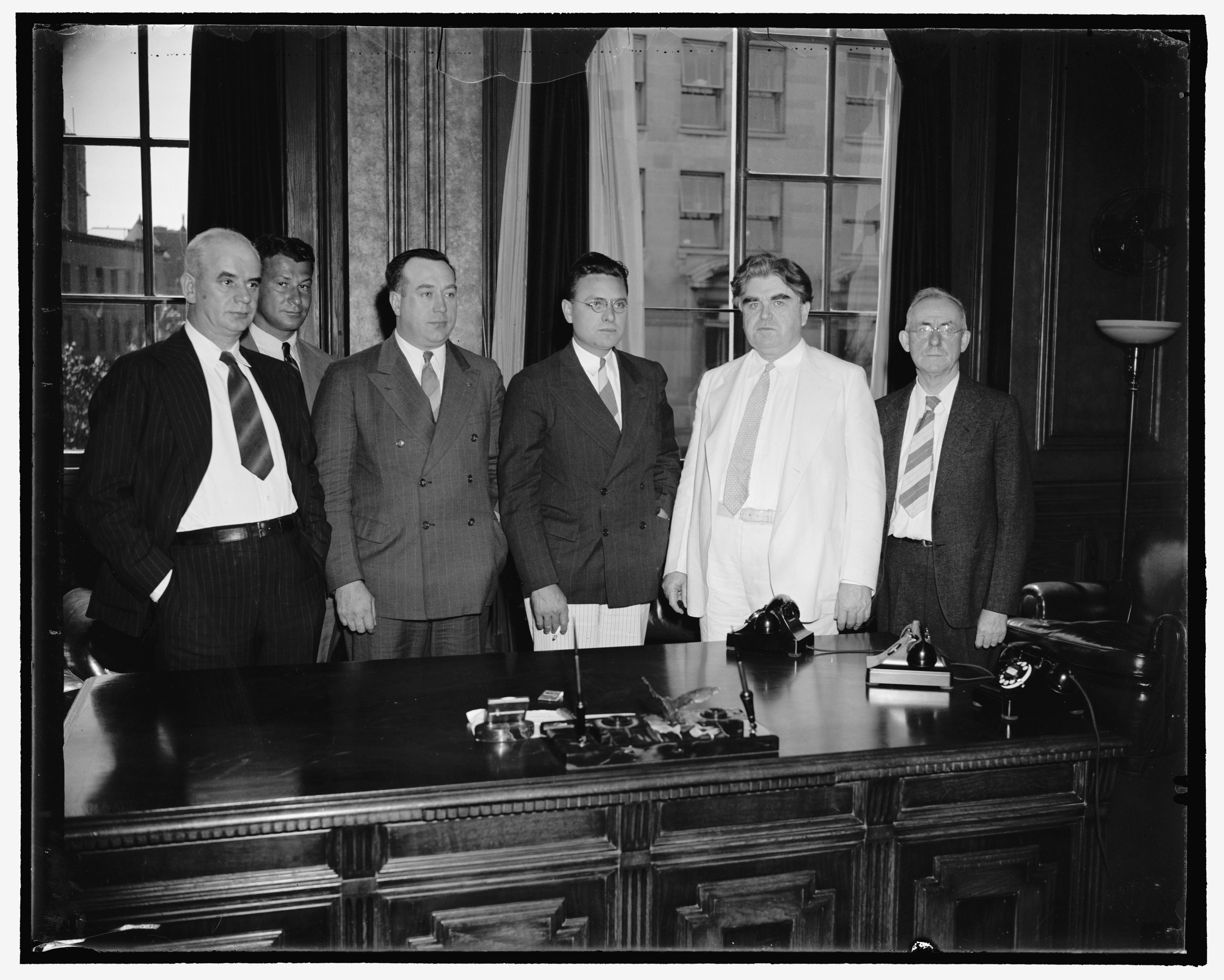
CIO leaders meet with UAW president Homer Martin in Washington, D.C., 1938. (L-R): Philip Murray, Lee Pressman, R. J. Thomas, Homer Martin, John L. Lewis, and John Brophy.

Pressman left government service in the winter of 1935-36 and went into private law practice in New York City with David Scribner as Pressman & Scribner. Clients included the Marine Engineers Beneficial Association (MEBA), the United Public Workers CIO, and other unions.

In 1943, during hearings by a Dies Committee "Special Committee on Un-American Activities," director of research J.B. Matthews asked whether witness Lucien Koch had retained the New York City law firm of "Hays, St. John, Abramson, and Schulman" and "Is this Lee Pressman's firm?"; Koch confirmed "yes." (Osmond K. Fraenkel, a fellow member of the National Lawyers Guild, was also a member of Hays, St. John, Abramson, and Schulman.)

In his role as the CIO's general counsel, Pressman was influential in helping to stop the attempt to deport Communist Longshoreman's Union official Harry Bridges. He continued to interact with Bridges well into June 1948, as longshoremen continued to threaten strikes on the Atlantic and Gulf Coasts and Bridges remained president of the International Longshore and Warehouse Union.

==== Under John L. Lewis 1936–1940 ====
In June 1936, Pressman was named a counsel of the Congress of Industrial Organizations (CIO—later AFL-CIO) for the Steel Workers Organizing Committee (SWOC—later, the United Steelworkers of America), appointed by union chief John L. Lewis as part of a conscious attempt to mobilize left-wing activists on behalf of the new labor federation. According to scholars, "One of Pressman's unofficial roles in the CIO was liaison between the CIO's Communist faction and its predominantly non-Communist leadership."

In 1936-1937, he supported the Great Flint Sit-Down Strike.

In 1937, Michigan Governor William Francis Murphy supported workers rights and the nascent United Auto Workers in a sit-down strike at General Motors plants. He listened to advice Pressman that civil rights statues passed to protect African-American voters during the Civil War might grant the federal government authority to intervene in strikes in terms of Free Speech, like strikes in Harlan County, Kentucky. In February 1939, when President Roosevelt made Murphy United States Attorney General, Murphy created a Civil Liberties Unit within the criminal division of the United States Department of Justice.

In June 1938, Pressman moved back to Washington, D.C., to become full-time general counsel for the CIO and the SWOC. He remained in this position for the next decade. (According to his obituary in the New York Times, he was general counsel from 1936 to 1948.)

In August 1938, Pressman criticized the American Bar Association in The CIO News in his own "bill of particulars," which included the following:

1. Mooney Case: ABA refused to investigate injustice committed therein
2. Industrial Espionage: ABA lawyers have worked with firms "that engage in industrial espionage"
3. Sacco-Vanzetti Case: ABA refused to investigate
4. Wagner Act: Shared ABA and NLG members declared this act "unconstitutional"
5. Racism: ABA membership asked for and often excluded members based on race ("White," "Indian," "Negro," "Mongolian")

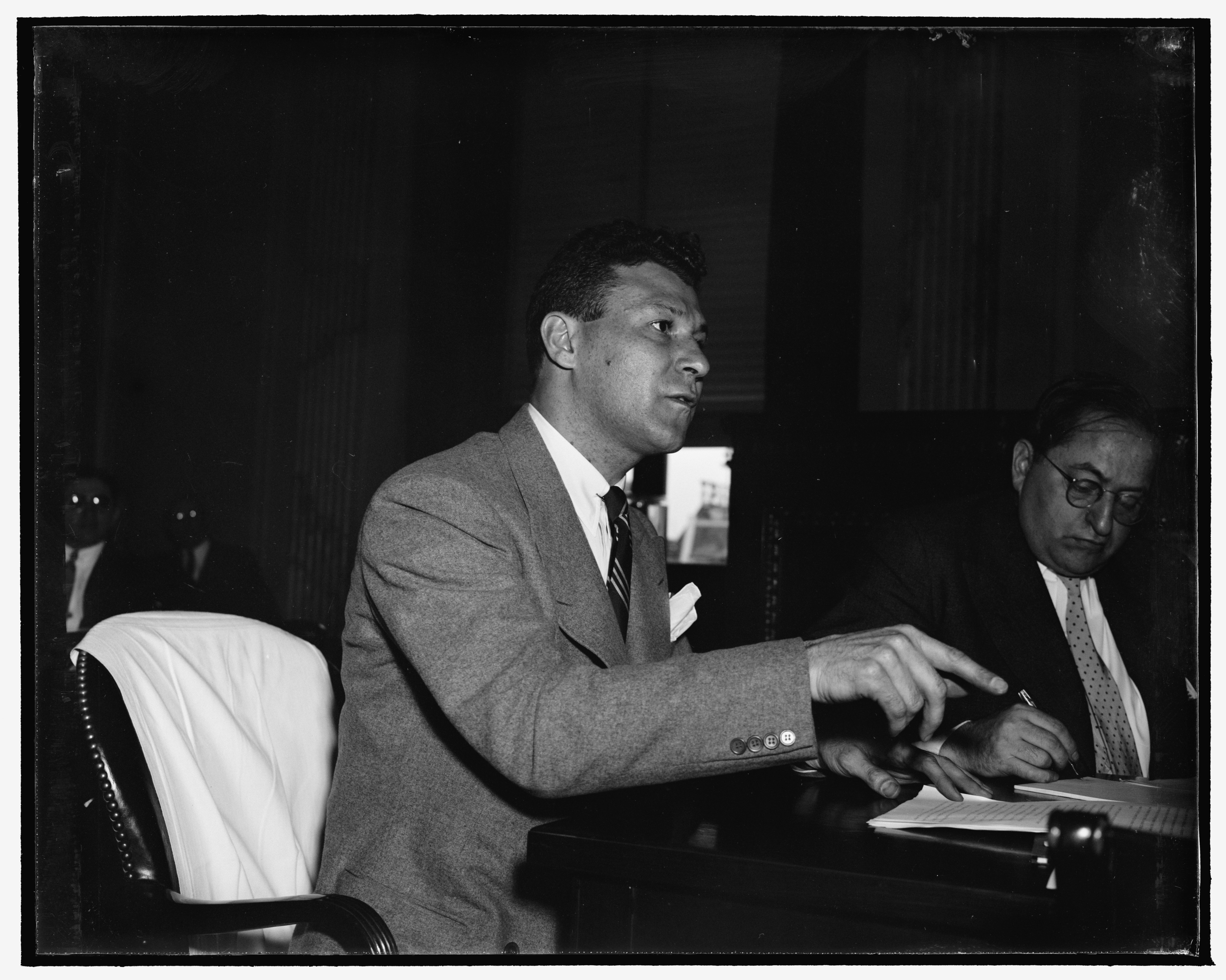
Pressman testifies on behalf of a National Health Bill, 1939

In May 1939, Pressman spoke on behalf of the CIO before the US Senate's Education and Labor sub-committee to support the "National Health Bill" (part of the Reorganization Act of 1939), sponsored by US Senator Robert F. Wagner. He attacked the American Medical Society's position against the bill as "reactionary," which he felt had kept the bill from going "far enough."

From May through August 1939, Pressman attacked support for the "Walsh amendments" to the 1935 National Labor Relations Act (AKA the "Wagner Act"). In May 1939, when AFL president William Green supported the amendments on CBS Radio, the CIO's response, penned by Pressman, accused Green of colluding with the National Association of Manufacturers against not just the CIO but also the AFL, i.e., workers. In August 1939, Pressman appeared before the Senate Labor Committee to state that Green's support did not represent AFL rank and file.

Also in August 1939, Congress passed the Hatch Act of 1939, which restricted political campaign activities by federal employees. A provision of the Hatch Act made it illegal for the federal government to employ anyone who advocated the overthrow of the federal government. The left-leaning United Public Workers of America (UFWA) immediately hired Pressman to challenge the constitutionality of the Hatch Act.

In October 1939, during a closed-door session during a CIO convention, president John L. Lewis declared his intent to rid the CIO of "Communist influence." This decision came in response particularly from Philip Murray and Sidney Hillman, the CIO's two vice presidents, that pre-dated the Hitler-Stalin Pact (announced the previous month). Instead, Lewis would empower eight member of the CIO's 42 executive committee members. Further, Lewis increased the number of CIO vice presidents from two to six with: R. J. Thomas, president of the United Automobile Workers; Emil Rieve, president of the Textile Workers of America; Sherman Dalrymple, president of the United Rubber Workers; and Reid Robinson, president of the International Union of Mine, Mill and Smelter Workers. "Left forces" failed to have Joseph Curran, president of the National Maritime Union, elected vice president. Further, Lewis demoted Harry Bridges from West Coast CIO director to California state CIO director. In 1939, New York Times reported on further internal conflict.

On January 3, 1940, Pressman discussed the "1940 Legislative Program of the CIO" on CBS Radio. orIn his speech, Pressman said:

On pretexts of economy, more money for war purposes and similar catch cries, the reactionary financial interests and their political henchmen hope to reduce appropriations for the unemployed and for publish works, to emasculate labor and social legislation, and to restrict our civil liberties. The CIO ... calls for a determined advance in adapting social legislation to the needs of the whole American people.

==== Under Philip Murray 1940–1948 ====
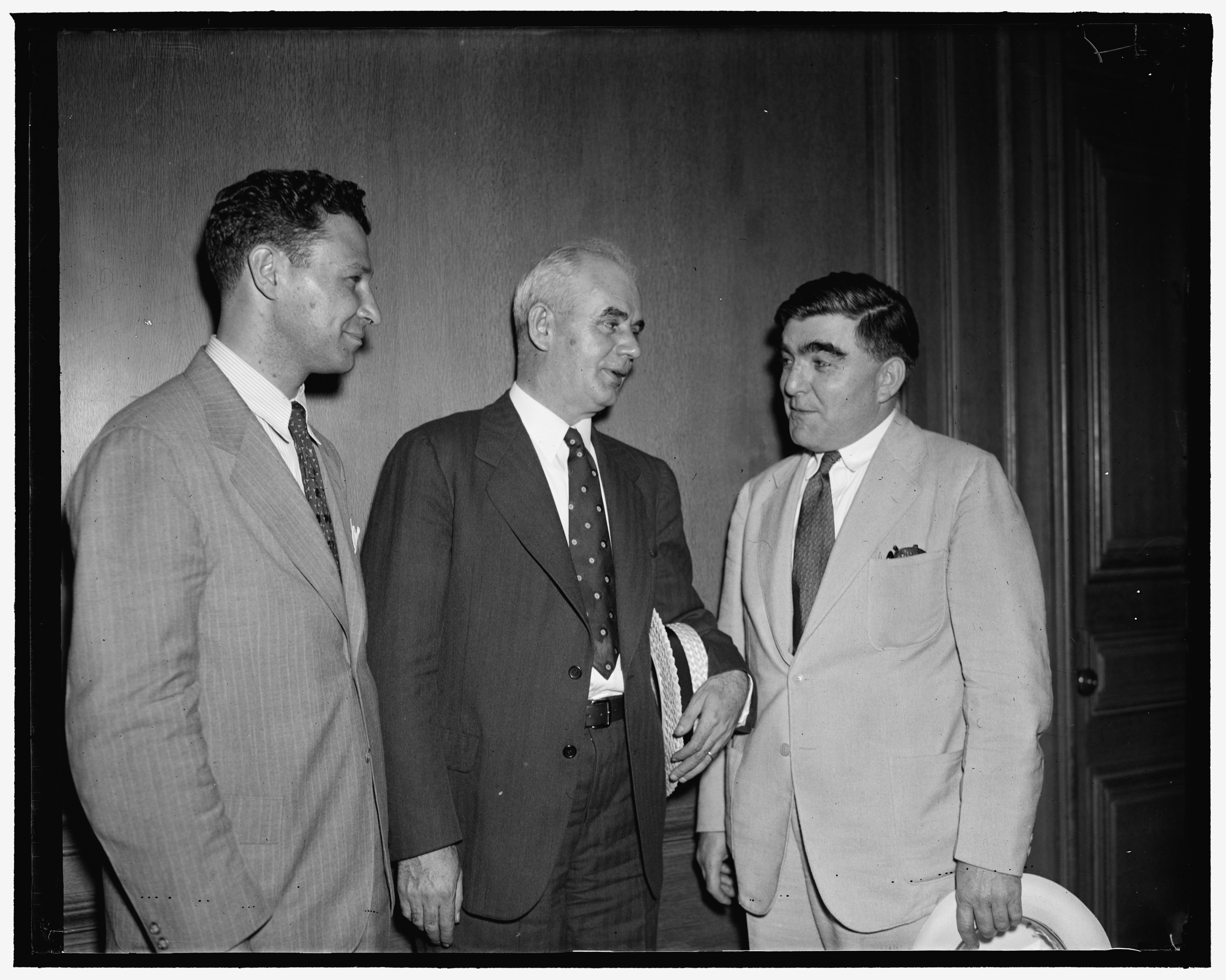
Pressman (left), Steel Workers Organizing Committee chairman Philip Murray (center), and A. D. Lewis (brother of CIO president John L. Lewis), 1937

On January 14, 1940, John L. Lewis retired from the CIO presidency, and Philip Murray succeeded him.

On May 18, 1940, Pressman again spoke on CBS Radio, this time on the "Wagner Act."

In 1941, FDR appointed CIO vice president Sidney Hill to the Office of Production Management. Hillman lobbied for a mediating entity to OPM, and FDR created the National Defense Mediation Board (NDMB). In June 1941, NMDB and the United Auto Workers took over a North American Aviation factory during a strike. Later in June 1941, at a convention of the National Lawyers Guild in Chicago, Pressman criticized the Vinson and Ball bills before the US Congress, both of which he accused of a "long-range" plan whose aims included "destruction of workers' rights to organize, bargain collectively, and strike"; "destruction of labor organizations as the barrier to unchecked monopoly profits"; and "complete control of the national economy and the government by big business."

Pressman continued to give as good as he got. In February 1940, he held a "heated exchange" with US Representative Clare Hatch during a hearing of the US House Labor Committee, again on the issue of amendments to the NRLA (Wagner Act):

Pressman: I'll answer the question all right, Mr. Hoffman. Representative Thomas can take care of himself.

Hoffman: This boy is not going to tell me what to ask. I won't take this from Pressman. Remember that.

Pressman: I'll remember all I say.

Hoffman: You keep a civil tongue in your head.

In September 1941, Pressman received a pin from pro-Communist Mike Quill, leader of the Transport Workers Union (TWU), a CIO member, during a TWU strike. Pressman then urged TWU strikers to stand up to the New York City government, as he had four years earlier in 1937 when the TWU first left the AFL for the CIO.

In July 1942, the National War Labor Board sought advice on FDR's wage stabilization policy by increasing wages in the four "Little Steel" companies with a combined 157,000 employees by one dollar. CIO president Philip Murray and Pressman both supported the increase.

In July 1943, the CIO formed a political action committee, the "CIO-PAC," chaired by Sidney Hillman, and supported by Pressman and John Abt as co-counsels. In his 1999 memoir, Abt, general counsel for the Amalgamated Clothing Workers of America under Sidney Hillman, claimed the leaders of the Communist Party of the USA had inspired the idea of the CIO-PAC:

In 1943, Gene Dennis came to me and Lee Pressman to first raise the idea of a political action committee to organize labor support for Roosevelt in the approaching 1944 election. Pressman approached Murray with the idea, as I did with Hillman. Both men seized upon the proposal with great enthusiasm.

Thus, in 1943, as American spy Elizabeth Bentley resurrected the Ware Group (of which Abt had been a member), could not risk involvement with her or the group. Instead, the group reformed under Victor Perlo as the Perlo Group.

In September 1943 at a conference of the National Lawyers Guild, Pressman praised labor for reducing strikes and promoting the war effort. He praised the National War Labor Board's policy for recognizing labor unions as institutions within the basic framework of our democratic society. He criticized "selfish blocs" in Congress that had opposed FDR's program.

In 1944, Pressman participated in resolution of a labor dispute of a national case in basic steel, involving some six hundreds unions on strike. The six-person board consisted of David L. Cole and Nathan P. Feisinger for the government, Philip Murry of the CIO with Pressman as counsel for unions, John Stevens with Chester McLain of U.S. Steel for industry.

During 1945–1947, Pressman worked with John Abt for the CIO to help create the World Federation of Trade Unions (WFTU) as successor to the International Federation of Trade Unions, itself seen as dominated by communist and socialist parties. During formation of the WFTU and in working with pro-Soviet American unions, "the active role played by" Pressman "in writing and rewriting convention resolutions helped to smooth possible conflicts."

In April 1945, Pressman represented Harry Bridges before the U.S. Supreme Court in Bridges v. Wixon with the help of Carol Weiss King and her recruit, Nathan Greene who penned the brief. Later that month, Pressman joined Murray, Abt, and other CIO officials in Paris for a meeting with Soviet counterparts about the WFTU. In October 1945, he traveled to Moscow with a CIO delegation in the company of John Abt among others.

On June 6, 1946, he contributed to a broadcast entitled "Should There Be Stricter Regulation of Labor Unions?" on America's Town Meeting of the Air show on NBC Radio with Sen. Allen J. Ellender, Henry J. Taylor, and Rep. Andrew J. Biemiller.

In July 1946, at a National Lawyers Guild convention in Cleveland, he attacked the "fallacious notion that increased wages in the interests of adequate purchasing power necessarily bring higher prices." He also attacked future Progressive Party vice presidential candidate, US Senator Glen H. Taylor, for the latter's prediction of economic uncertainty due to monopolies. He asked that an "aroused and enlightened public" make itself heard in Congress and in the 1946 fall elections:

This Congress has sought to stifle labor organization and at the same time has fought vigorously to assure expanded profit levels through tax and price policies. It has resisted any effort to lighten the tax burden on the lower income groups, but has acted swiftly to remove the excess-profits tax on corporations while continuing the carry-back provisions permitting gigantic tax rebates out of excess-profits tax payments of prior years.

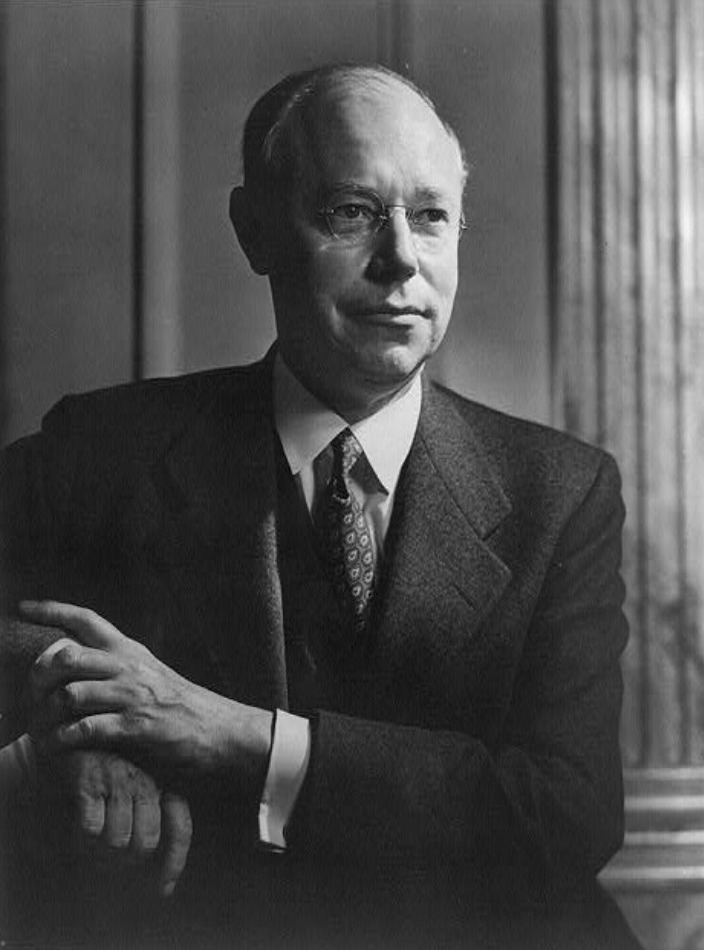
US Senator Robert A. Taft, official portrait

In 1947, Pressman became involved in passage of the Taft-Hartley Act. In January 1947, he appeared on "New York Times radio" station WQXR-FM with US Senator Carl A. Hatch, former National War Labor Board chairman William Hammatt Davis, and General Precision Equipment Corporation general counsel Robert T. Rinear, to debate the topic "Do we need new labor laws?" While endorsing a Truman commission plan, he attacked any labor legislation passed hastily ahead of the commission's results, saying, "Judging from the bills now before Congress, their purpose is merely to penalize labor organizations." Senator Hatch agreed with him that severe wage cuts in terms of real wages and increased cost of living would not find resolutions in terms of legislation that addresses only jurisdictional disputes or secondary boycotts. "We need additional and new laws on all phases of the general problem of labor-management," Hatch said. Again in January 1947, on the topic of the related Portal to Portal Act of 1947, publicly before the US Senate Judiciary Committee, he urged Congress to make that act a simple authorization to employers and unions to settle portal claims through collective bargaining, while prohibiting management from attempting such settlements with individual workers at the "economic mercy" of employers. Further, he urged Congress to use the US Supreme Court's definition of "work" as activities of an employee which required physical or mental exertion for an employer's benefit and under an employer's control. Any legislation that ended portal-to-portal claims, he said, would "most seriously undermine" and in fact threatened "the entire future, operation" of the 1938 Fair Labor Standards Act. Again at month's end, he attacked labor curb bills in Congress during a speech before the University of Cincinnati Lawyers Institute. He said:

Where parties agree to union security, what objection can there be? Nine million workers are now covered by such contracts. The status of the union under the Wagner Act established the obligation not to discriminate against non-members. Why should not all employees, therefore, have an obligation to become members? ...
The anti-trust law stating that the service of the human being is a commodity is a negation of the Constitution, of the 1918 Clayton Act and the [1932] Norris-La Guardia Act ...
The employer's right of free speech is fully protected ...
The act has not created inequality between employers and employees for collective bargaining. The fairness of the Labor Board has been established by decisions of the Supreme Court ...
[A compulsory] "cooling-off period" [would] actually discourage collective bargaining ...
There is adequate protection in State courts for breach of collective bargaining agreements. Federal legislation will limit the protection labor unions now have under the anti-injunction statute. Litigation for alleged breach of contract is negation of collective bargaining and would merely clutter up the courts.

He also asserted that labor unions do not constitute monopolies, compared with industrial combines.

In June 1947, Pressman also wrote an influential critique of the Taft-Hartley Act, used by President Harry S. Truman as background material to justify his "bristling" veto of the measure. Co-sponsor, US Senator Robert A. Taft belittled Truman's veto: "The veto message covers the Pressman memorandum which the Senator from Montana (James E. Murray) put in the record and to which I replied. The veto message substantially in detail follows the Pressman memorandum ... point by point." Taft's accusation drew considerable attention for days. On July 4, the Washington Post's Drew Pearson noted "There've been considerable charges and counter-charges that CIO Counsel Lee Pressman ghost-wrote the hot White House veto message on the Taft-Hartley labor bill. Truth is that he had no direct hand in writing the message, though some of his words did creep in." Pearson explained that White House Assistant Clark Clifford had penned the veto with help from William S. Tyson, solicitor of the US Labor Department, and Paul Herzog, chairman of the National Labor Relations Board – and their "analyses" of the bill bore striking resemblance to Pressman's analysis." Later on June 24, 1947, Pressman appeared again on CBS Radio with Raymond Smethurst, general counsel of NAM to discuss the effect of the new labor law. In August 1947, he gave a strong speech to the International Union of Mine, Mill and Smelter Workers (IUMMSW) against the Taft-Hartley Act.

In August 1947, Pressman and Reid Robinson called for a third party to support Henry A. Wallace for U.S. President during a convention of the Mine, Mill and Smelter Workers ("a Communist-dominated union").

By September, the right wing of the CIO, led by Emil Rieve, claimed they were about to drive left wingers "with Lee Pressman as the leading victim" out of the CIO during its Fall 1947 convention.

In late 1947, Meyer Bernstein of the United Steel Workers of America wrote as an anti-communist against Pressman (amidst a rising tide led by Walter Reuther against pro-communists in the CIO).

=== 1948 ===
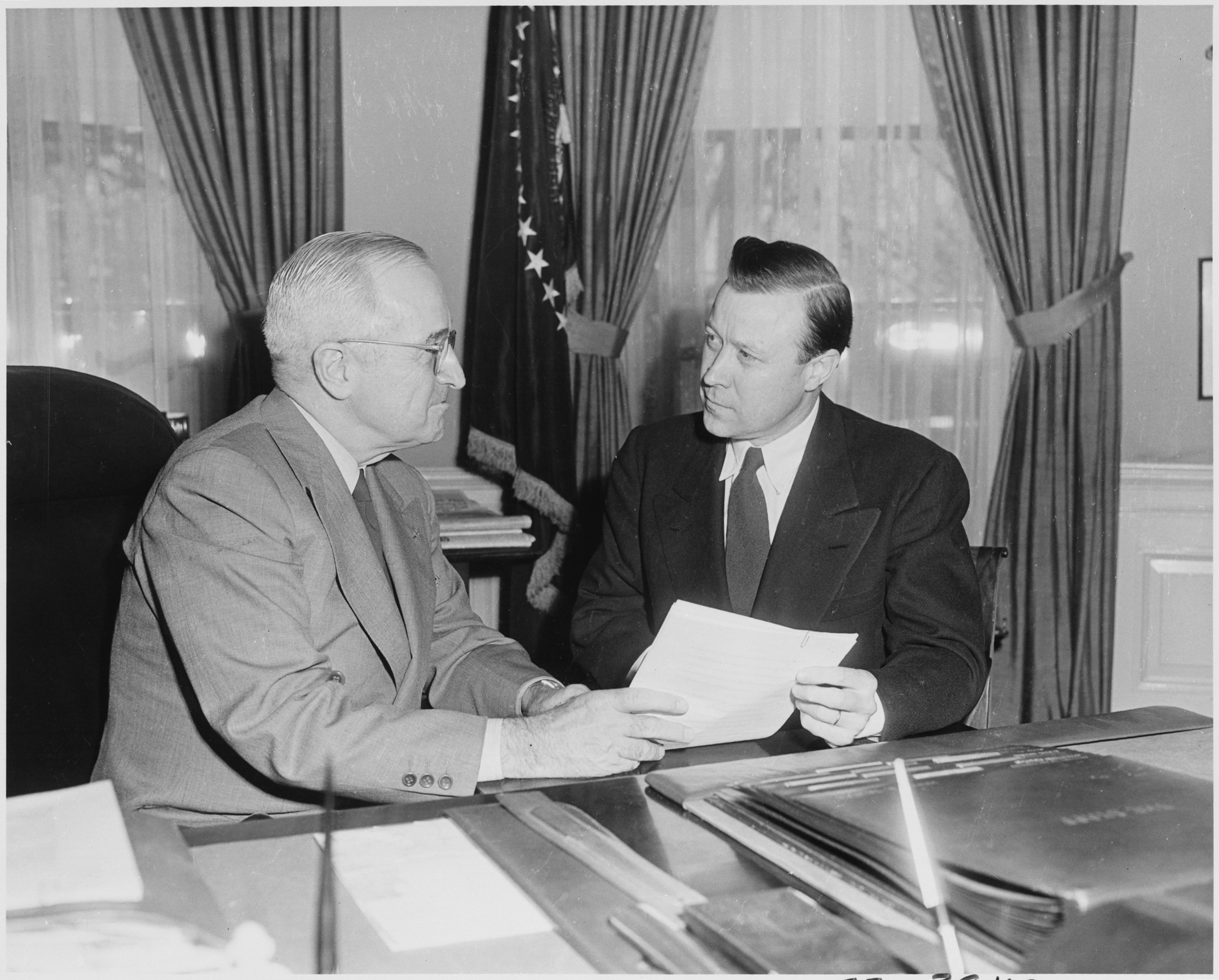
Walter Reuther (right) conferring with President Truman in the Oval Office (1952)

As of 1948, James I. Loeb, co-founder of both the Union for Democratic Action (UDA) Americans for Democratic Action (ADA), stated that Pressman was "probably was the most important Communist in the country ... he certainly was a Communist influence."

In early 1948, Pressman led a group of like-minded colleagues in a pitch to CIO executives to abandon Truman and the Democratic Party for Henry A. Wallace and his Progressive Party. The pitch failed. Repercussions came quickly. In late 1947, housecleaning of the CIO from communists had already begun when Len De Caux was let go by Murray.

==== Private practice ====
On February 4, 1948, Pressman was "fired from his $19,000 job as CIO general counsel, reportedly as a byproduct of a factional struggle within the federation in which anti-Communist labor leader Walter Reuther emerged triumphant. Time magazine (anti-communist) gloated, "Lee Pressman and his Communist line are no longer popular in the C.I.O., where Walter Reuther's right wing is in ascendancy." (On March 4, 1948, CIO president Philip Murray announced his replacement by Arthur J. Goldberg.) Pressman went into private legal practice in New York City following his firing. In March and April 1948, however, it was clear that the CIO still used his services, even after "firing" him. In March 1948, he joined CIO attorneys in opposing Government attorneys, who had declared that "the Taft-Hartley Law's ban against expenditures by labor unions in connection with Federal elections permissibly limited Constitutional guarantees of freedom of speech and of the press." In April 1948, he represented the CIO before the Supreme Court in a case about barring of expenditures by labor unions for political purposes. (Felix Frankfurter, then Supreme Court Justice, taught at Harvard Law while Pressman was a student there.)

In March 1948, Pressman's name appeared in the New York Times as legal counsel of the Furriers Joint Board. The thousand-member Associated Fur Coat and Trimming Manufacturers, Inc., had asked for a return to pre-WWII two-season wage scheme plus compliance with affidavits from non-communist union leaders per the Taft-Hartley Act. The latter condition put pressure on two CPUSA union leaders, Ben Gold and Irving Potash. "In a unique turn of events," Pressman cited a Taft-Hartley Act provision to block a lockout. He sued for a temporary injunction based on failure by employers to give 60-day lockout notice to workers, plus failure to provide thirty-day notification to Federal and state mediation services. He also helped get Potash set free on $5,000 bail while awaiting deportation hearings.

Pressman continued private practice. He continued to represent the MEBA, e.g., over a restraining order against strikes on the Atlantic and Gulf Coasts in 1948. At the Supreme Court he represented Philip Murray (1886–1952), Scottish-born steelworker and American labor leader, first president of SWOC and USWA, and longest-serving president of the CIO.

Also in March 1948, Pressman joined a group of lawyers in defending five "aliens" against deportation hearings due to their Communist ties. Pressman represented all five, at least some of whom had their own attorneys: alleged Soviet spy Gerhart Eisler (represented by Abraham J. Isserman), Irving Potash of the Fur and Leather Workers Union, Ferdinand C. Smith of the National Maritime Union (Pressman); Charles A. Doyle of the Gas, Coke and Chemical Workers Union (Isadore Englander), and CPUSA labor secretary John Williamson (Carol Weiss King). Pressman went on to join Joseph Forer, a Washington-based attorney, in representing the five before the U.S. Supreme Court. On May 5, 1948, Pressman and Forer received a preliminary injunction so their defendants might have hearings with examiners unconnected with the investigations and prosecutions by examiners of the Immigration and Naturalization Service. (All attorneys were members of the National Lawyers Guild.)

On May 16, 1948, the United Public Workers read aloud their general counsel Pressman's letter, summarized by the New York Times:

The Congressional proposal to prohibit payment of Federal wages to members of groups whose leaders refused to swear they were not Communists violated the constitutional rights of civil service workers.

Mr. Pressman contended that the proposed ban would deprive civil service workers of freedom of speech, press and assembly under the first amendment, would violate their right to participate in political activity under the ninth and tenth amendments and would impose a test of "guilt by association" in contravention of the fifth amendment.

One of the most basic doctrines in American jurisprudence is that individuals may not be prosecuted for acts except for those for which they are directly responsible. It is this doctrine which precludes any individual from being adjudged guilty because of association, rather than because of his own personal guilt. It is this doctrine which is directly violated by the proposed rider.

On May 19, 1948, Securities and Exchange Commission official Anthon H. Lund accused Pressman of interfering in a lawsuit filed against the Kaiser-Frazer car manufacturing company in a Federal District Court in New York City. He specified that between February 3 and 9, 1948, Harold J. Ruttenberg, vice president of the Portsmouth Steel Corporation, had contacted Pressman for advice on "how to go about filing a stockholder's suite against Kaiser-Frazer." Later in May, during testimony before an SEC board of inquiry, Pressman declared he had "absolutely nothing to do with" the suit. "I have not been requested by anyone to suggest the name of a lawyer who would file a lawsuit against the Kaiser-Frazer Corporation." He stated, "I demand that I be given the opportunity to examine Mr. Lund under oath on the stand to determine who gave him that inaccurate information." The trial's examiner Milton P. Kroll informed Pressman, "You have been given the opportunity to state your position on the record. Your request is denied."

After passage of the Mundt-Nixon Bill on May 19, 1948, at month's end Pressman submitted a long, undated statement called "The Mundt Control Bill (H.R. 5852), a Law to Legalize Fascism and Destroy American Democracy" as part of proceedings by the Senate Judicial Committee on "Control of Subversive Activities."

During 1948, Pressman formed Pressman, Witt & Cammer; Bella Abzug started her career there. Since February 1948 or earlier, Witt's clients had included the Greater New York CIO Council. In September 1948, Pressman and Charles J. Margiotti tested the campaign-expenditures provision of the Taft-Hartley Act. Pressman and Margiotti each received $37,500 for their services – a fee CIO President Philip Murray called "outrageous, even for Standard Oil."

==== Political involvements ====
Pressman was important enough in American politics to have Arthur Schlesinger, Jr. single him out as recent example in Schlesinger's concept of the Vital Center as first described in a long New York Times article in 1948 entitled "Not Left, Not Right, but a Vital Center." In it, Schlesinger argues first that the 19th Century concept of "linear" spectrum Left and Right did not fit developments of the 20th Century. Rather, he promoted the "circular" spectrum of DeWitt Clinton Poole, in which Fascism and Nazism would meet at the circle's bottom with Soviet Communism (Leninism, Stalinism). He himself promotes the term "Non-Communist Left" (NCL) as an American modification of Leon Blum's Third Force. He cites as example the ascendancy of Walter Reuther in the CIO and ouster of Lee Pressman:

Newspapers will doubtless continue to refer to Walter Reuther as the leader of the Right wing of the CIO, whereas, as every automobile manufacturer knows, Reuther is to the Right only in the sense of being profoundly pro-democratic and anti-Communist ... Instead of backing the Non-Communist Left as the group in Europe closest to the American progressive faith in combining freedom· and planning, the CIO, for example, maintained a disturbing silence over foreign affairs; and altogether too many liberals followed Communist cues in rejoicing at every Soviet triumph and at every Socialist discomfiture. The Wallace Doctrine of non-interference with Soviet expansion prevailed in these years. In recent months, the conception of the non-Communist Left has made headway in the United States. On the moderate Right, men like Senator Vandenberg and John Foster Dulles have recognized its validity. The fight against Communist influence in the CIO, culminating in Walter Reuther's victory in the United Auto Workers and the discharge of Lee Pressman as CIO general counsel, has finally brought the CIO side by side with the AFL in support of the Third Force in Europe.

Schlesinger was carefully noting the entrance of Pressman into national politics.

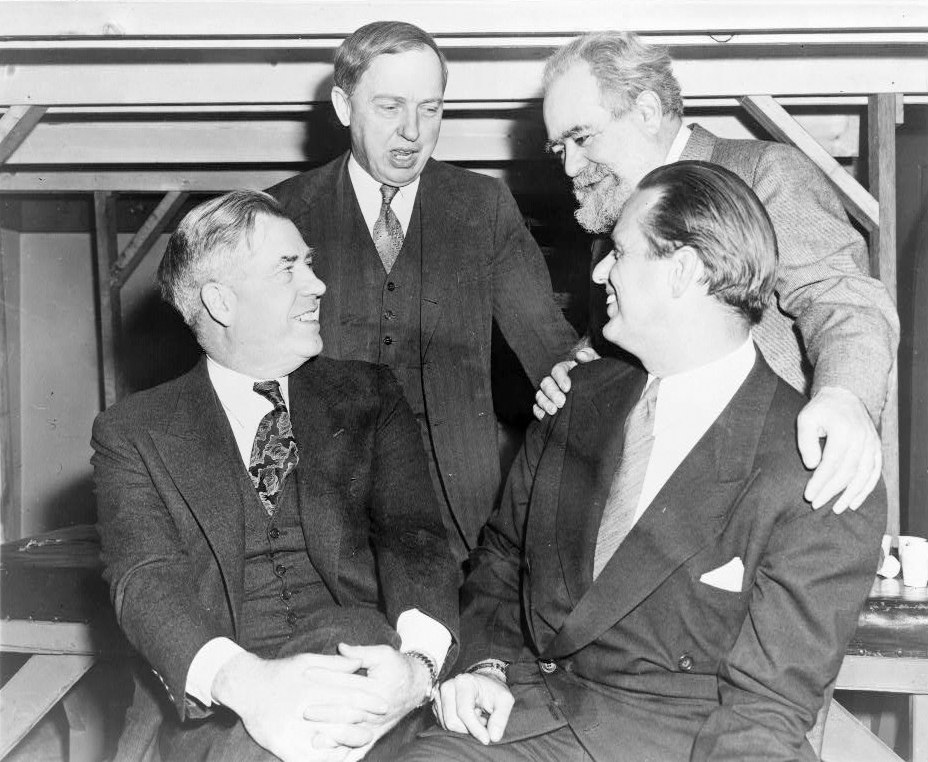
Progressive Citizens of America members, 1947. From left, seated, Henry A. Wallace, Elliott Roosevelt; standing, Dr. Harlow Shapley, Jo Davidson.

Pressman became a close adviser of Progressive Party 1948 presidential candidate Henry A. Wallace. In fact, when his former AAA boss Rexford Tugwell joined the Progressive Party campaign in early 1948, "he did so on condition that Lee Pressman would serve as its secretary."

In March 1948, Pressman joined a 700-member national organization in support of Henry A. Wallace for U.S. president and Glen H. Taylor for U.S. vice president.

By June 1948, the New York Times cited him as "general counsel" for the "National Labor Committee for Wallace." At the party's convention (July 23–25, 1948), Pressman served on the committee (under Rexford Tugwell, who had helped create and directed the AAA back in the early 1930s) to create a platform that the New York Times summed up as "endorsing Red foreign policy."

At the time, the Washington Post dubbed Pressman, Abt, and Calvin Benham "Beanie" Baldwin (C. B. Baldwin) as "influential insiders" and "stage managers" in the Wallace campaign. However, he was reportedly "forced out because of his Communist line."

During the 1948 convention, the New York Times described as follows:

Lee Pressman, who, for years, exerted a powerful left-wing influence as counsel for the CIO, is secretary of the Platform Committee, which will hold another executive session at 10 A. M. Friday before preparing its final draft for submission to the 2,500 delegates who are expected at the convention's closing session next Sunday.

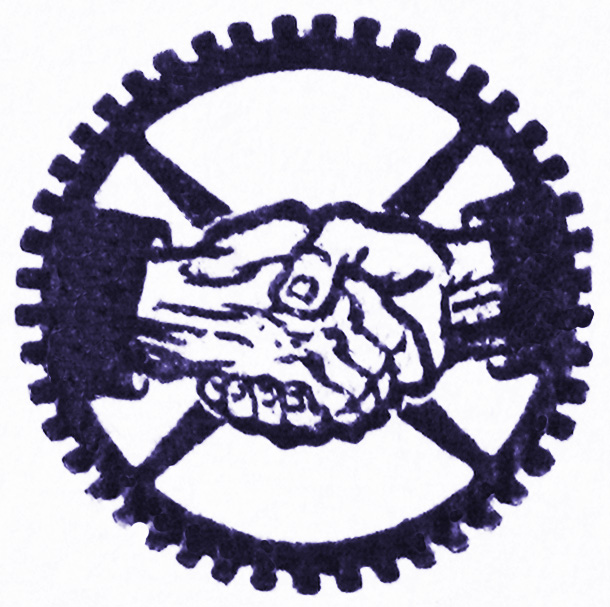
American Labor Party logo

On June 9, 1948, Pressman declared that he himself was running for public office as the candidate of the American Labor Party for U.S. Congress in the 14th District of New York (Brooklyn). In early July 1948, he registered his candidacy. He ran against Abraham J. Multer. Multer used Pressman's communist association against him early on by claiming that he had received his "certificate of election" from the Daily Worker (CPUSA newspaper), thanks to its condemnation of him. In July 1948, he faced condemnation from New York state's CIO head Louis Hollander, who promised to oppose Pressman's candidacy. In late August 1948, he

In August 1948, during the Progressive Party convention in Philadelphia, Rexford Tugwell, chairman of its platform committee found his self-style "old-fashioned American progressive" platform scrapped by a pro-Communist line platform spearheaded by Pressman. TIME magazine noted, "It now seemed obvious to Tugwell that the Communists had taken over."

In the fall of 1948, Communist affiliation continued to hound Pressman's campaign. A month before the election, Pressman might have held out hope, as the New York Times characterized him as a lawyer of "wide reputation" and a man with a "national reputation" and did not mention allegations in Washington. Days before the election, headlines in the Brooklyn and New York area were still appearing, like this from the Brooklyn Daily Eagle: "Pressman: Candidate for Congress, Long Active in Pro-Red Groups."

=== Private practice 1951-1969 ===
Between 1948 and 1950, Pressman had represented "the estates of persons with heirs in Russia" of interest to the Soviets as well as affairs of AMTORG.

By 1951, Pressman had only one major client left, the Marine Engineers Beneficial Association (MEBA). Its president, Herbert Daggett, retained Pressman at $10,000 (some $94,000 adjusted for 2017).

== Espionage allegations ==
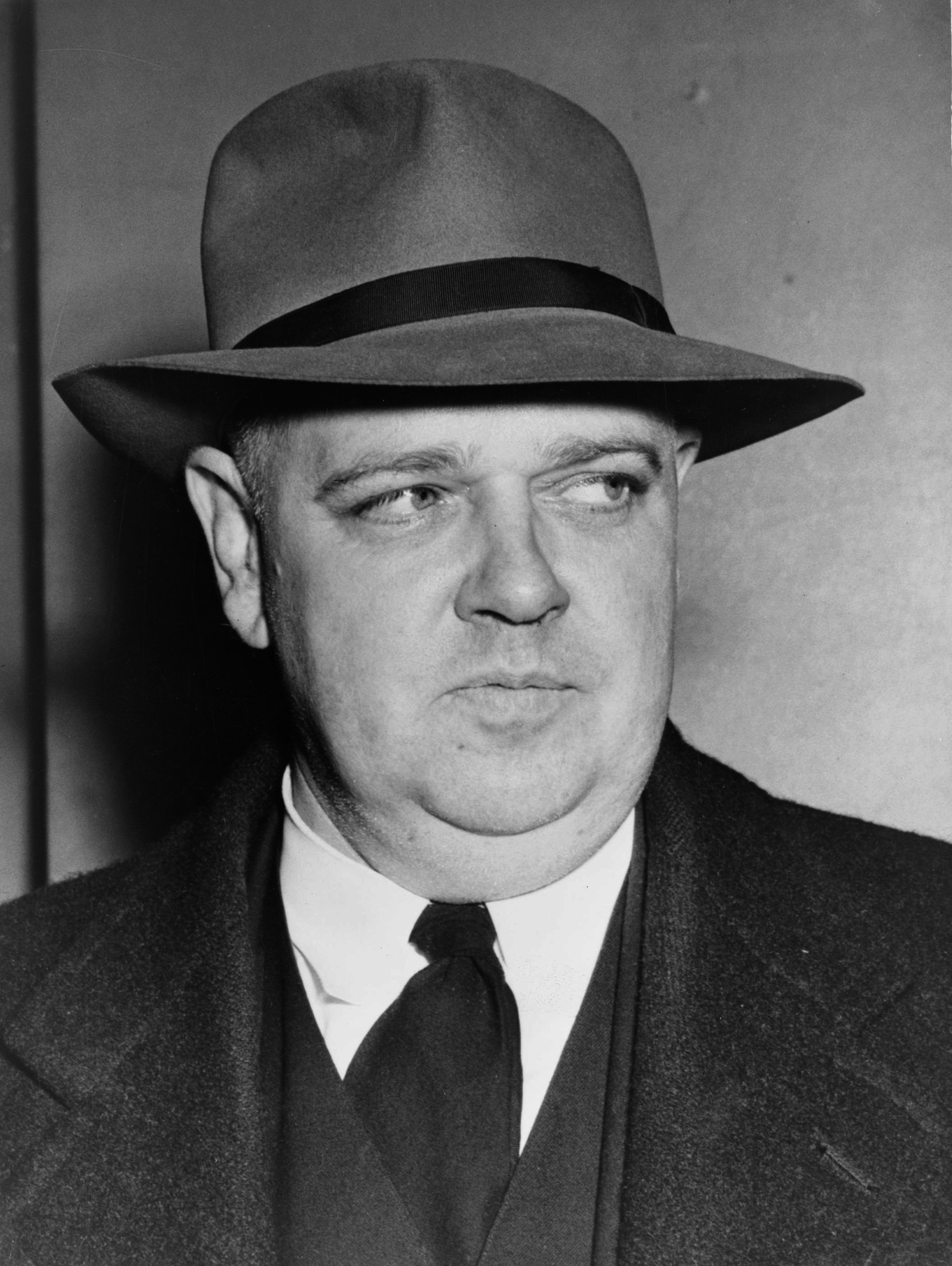
Whittaker Chambers (1948)

=== Ware Group (1933–1935) ===
In 1933, Pressman was one of the original members of the Ware Group. He was present at its earliest known meeting. Furthermore, surmised historian Allen Weinstein, as the "top-ranking AAA official in the Ware Group," he was most likely also a top recruiter of new members. Weinstein also noted that, according to Gardner Jackson, Pressman had recommended that the Nye Committee take Alger Hiss on loan.

In 1935, he left the group and Washington, D.C. Of his time there, Ware Group controller J. Peters said of Pressman that he was a "big climber" and had a "bad case of 'big-shotitis'."

In 1936, when Pressman began work as general counsel for the CIO, Peters recommended against it, as Pressman was hard to control. However, Chambers encouraged him to take the position anyway.

In 1936–1937, Chambers put Pressman in touch with Philip Rosenbliett and "Mack Moren" to travel to Mexico and buy arms for "J. Eckhart," a representative of the Loyalists in the Spanish Civil War.

In 1939, former underground Communist Whittaker Chambers privately identified Pressman to Assistant Secretary of State Adolf Berle as a member of a so-called "Ware group" of Communist government officials supplying information to the secret Soviet intelligence network.

In the 1940s, the FBI investigated Pressman and other Communists. On October 31, 1943, during a CIO convention in Philadelphia, the FBI recorded conversations of Roy Hudson, then CPUSA labor secretary. Hudson met with CIO union leaders (including Harry Bridges). On November 5, they heard identified the voice of a man whom Hudson instructed on Party demands for changes in the CIO platform: the name was Lee Pressman. Pressman's meetings continued with Hudson into September 1944.

Historian Robert H. Zieger held that Pressman was no longer a communist by the time he joined the CIO. Instead, he claimed that Pressman was important to the CIO because he "retained close ties with the CPUSA."

=== 1948 denial ===
On August 3, 1948, in testimony under subpoena before the House Committee on Un-American Activities (HUAC), Chambers identified Pressman as a member of the Ware group.

On August 4, Pressman characterized Chambers' testimony as "smearing me with the stale and lurid mouthings of a Republican exhibitionist who was bought by Henry Luce." By using Chambers, he claimed, HUAC sought to achieve three objectives: distract Americans from "the real issues" (civil rights, inflation, housing, Israel, and repeal of the Taft-Hartley Act), smear FDR's New Deal officials, and discredit Henry Wallace and his associates."

On August 20, 1948, in testimony under subpoena before the HUAC, Pressman declined to answer questions regarding Communist Party membership, citing grounds of potential self-incrimination.

=== 1950 admission ===
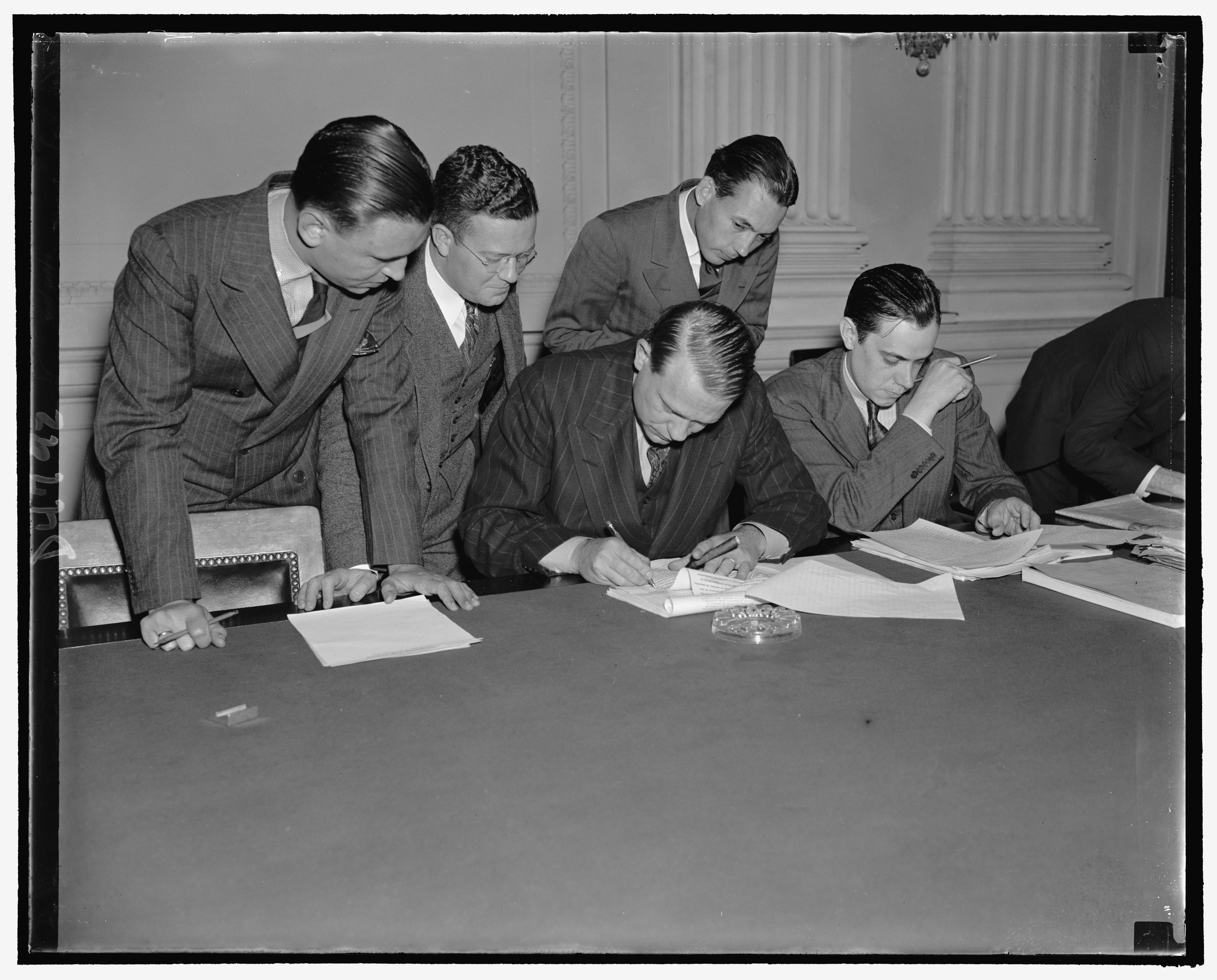
Chairman Martin Dies, Jr. of HUAC proofs his letter replying to FDR's attack on his committee (1938)

During the superheated political environment which surrounded the Korean War, Pressman seems to have stepped back from his previous communist affinities. In 1950, Pressman resigned from the American Labor Party because of "Communist control of that organization," which was reported in the press and which signaled HUAC that Pressman was at last ready to talk.

Called again before Congress to give testimony on Communist Party activities, on August 28, 1950, Pressman reversed his previous decision to exercise his Fifth Amendment rights and gave testimony against his former comrades. Pressman stated:

In my desire to see the destruction of Hitlerism and an improvement in economic conditions here at home, I joined a Communist group in Washington, D. C, about 1934. My participation in such group extended for about a year, to the best of my recollection. I recall that about the latter part of 1935— the precise date I cannot recall, but it is a matter of public record — I left the Government service and left Washington to reenter the private practice of law in New York City. And at that time I discontinued any further participation in the group from that date until the present.

He stated that he had no information about the political views of his former law school classmate Alger Hiss and specifically denied that Hiss was a participant in this Washington group. He indicated that in at least one meeting of his group, perhaps two, he had met Soviet intelligence agent J. Peters. Although he made no mention of having himself conducted intelligence-gathering activities, his 1950 testimony provided the first corroboration of Chambers' allegation that a Washington, D.C., communist group around Ware existed, with federal officials Nathan Witt, John Abt and Charles Kramer named as members of this party cell. TIME magazine mocked Pressman in its reportage in the issue following his hearing:

Like many another smart young man who followed the Communist line, sharp-eyed, sharply dressed Attorney Lee Pressman did very well for a long time. Har-vardman Pressman launched his leftward-turning career in Henry Wallace's AAA back in 1933, ended up as chief counsel of the CIO. He held the post for twelve years. But though he was a skilled labor lawyer, his fellow-traveling finally became too much for Phil Murray; 2½ years ago, Murray tearfully threw him out.
His star did not entirely wane. He became a power among the back-room Reds who steered Henry Wallace through the presidential campaign. But when the Korean war began, he, like Wallace, began slipping away from his Commie cronies. California's Congressman Richard Nixon, scenting opportunity, decided to call him before the House Un-American Activities Committee and ask him a few questions. (Once before, when Whittaker Chambers named Pressman as a member of the same elite apparatus as Alger Hiss, Pressman had taken refuge in the Fifth Amendment, refused to answer Congressmen's questions.)
Last week, Pressman decided to reverse his field...
This week ... he reluctantly consented to name three men who had been fellow Communists in the '30s—John Abt, Nathan Witt and Charles Kramer...

== Personal and death ==
On June 28, 1931, Pressman married the former Sophia Platnik. The couple had three daughters.

He was a member of the International Juridical Association (IJA) ("probably through Shad Polier who was a classmate of mine at law school"), the National Lawyers Guild (NLG), and the New York Bar Association. According to biographer Gilbert J. Gall, Pressman, Witt, and others formed the "radical" wing of the NLG against a more moderate, liberal wing led by NLG president Morris Ernst (also co-founder of the American Civil Liberties Union).

In 1957, he stated during an interview:

I don't think today's generation has nearly as exciting a life as we did when we were in our twenties, but I suppose it's the times. It seems to me that the labor movement with all the strength it has nowadays should be able to organize several million unorganized workers.

Pressman died at home at 26 Forster Avenue in Mt. Vernon, New York, on November 20, 1969. Sophia Platnik Pressman (Cornell '28) died on May 12, 1980, in Sandia Park, New Mexico.

== Legacy ==
"Showing men in power how to get things done legally" was Pressman's special skill, asserts historian Gilbert J. Gall in a biography of Pressman.

TIME magazine (never a friend of Pressman's) wrote at his death:

Died. Lee Pressman, 63, the C.I.O.'s legal counsel from 1936 until 1948, when his far-left politics finally cost him his job and career; of cancer; in Mt. Vernon, N.Y. Pressman never made any bones about his Communist leanings, often supporting the Moscow line. Yet as a union lawyer he was tops; he played a major role in negotiating the original C.I.O. contracts with such industrial giants as U.S. Steel and General Motors, and ably fought labor cases before the Supreme Court.

In 1948, "the first of a series of reports on Communists and Pro-Communists for Wallace" summarized Pressman's role in both the CIO and the 1948 presidential campaign as follows:

Before taking up the question of the Wallace vote in the CIO Executive Board [in January 1948], it is pertinent to discuss the resignation of Lee Pressman as general counsel of the CIO. Less Pressman has exercised a dominant role in the CIO, thanks to his appointment by John L. Lewis.
The main reason for his resignation, given by Pressman himself, was that he would be able to participate in the Wallace campaign for the presidency. Inasmuch as the CIO Executive Board voted in January 1948, three to one against Wallace's candidacy, Pressman's position became untenable.
Long before John L. Lewis selected him as general counsel of the CIO, Lee Pressman was a member of the Communist Party. The fact of Pressman's Communist Party membership was first revealed in the newspapers by Nelson Frank in the New York World Telegram on November 25, 1946. Pressman did not challenge Frank's statement. Frank's revelation may be accepted as authentic, without fear of a challenge by Pressman. Just why Philip Murray submitted meekly to the rule of a known Communist for so many years is a difficult question to answer. Nevertheless, the fact is on the record.
Right down the line for twelve years, Lee Pressman has been loyal to the Communist Party. Henry A. Wallace has done the CIO and the country a distinct service by driving Pressman into the open as a support of Stalin's candidate–nothing more, nothing less. Lee Pressman had to make his choice: either get out of the Communinst Party and hold his job in the CIO, or resign from the CIO and support the Communist Party's candidate. He did the latter, and in so doing clarified the political situation in the United States in 1948...
(Pressman's) resignation ... was one of the most significant defeats which the Communists have suffered in the CIO.

== Subsequent findings ==
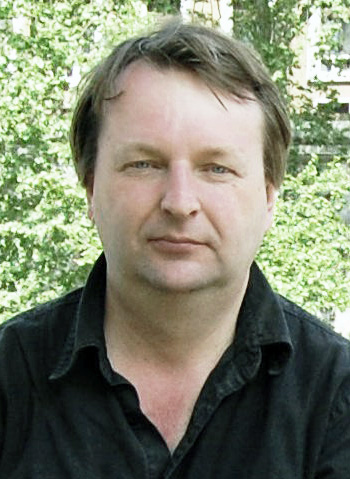
KGB expert Alexander Vassiliev.

Pressman's VENONA codename was "Vig."

In 1946, VENONA reveals that Pressman hosted Mikhail Vavilov, first secretary in the Soviet embassy, at his home in Washington, D.C., where he met fellow (former) Ware Group member Charles Kramer.

In 1948, Anatoly Gorsky, former chief of Soviet intelligence operations in the United States, listed Pressman, code-named "Vig–Lee Pressman, former legal adviser of the Congress of Industrial Organizations" among the Soviet sources likely to have been identified by US authorities, as a result of the defection of Soviet courier Elizabeth Bentley three years earlier.

In 1949, VENONA reveals that the KGB used Pressman to pay Victor Perlo for "analysis." In 1950, it reported "Vig–covering the activities of the Progressive Party." In 1951, Pressman served as "conduit" to pay funds to Harold Glasser.

In 1951, VENONA reveals that Soviet intelligence in Washington reported to Moscow, "Vig has chosen to betray us."

Following the fall of the Soviet Union, archival information on Soviet espionage activity in America began to emerge. Working in Soviet intelligence archives in the middle 1990s, Russian journalist Alexander Vassiliev discovered that Pressman, codenamed "Vig", had told only fragments of the truth to Congressional inquisitors in 1950. Working with historians John Earl Haynes and Harvey Klehr, Vassiliev revealed that Pressman had actually remained "part of the KGB's support network" by providing legal aid and funneling financial support to exposed intelligence assets. As late as September 1949, Soviet intelligence had paid $250 through Pressman to Victor Perlo for an analysis of the American economic situation, followed by an additional $1,000 in October.

A 1951 Soviet intelligence report indicated that "Vig" had "chosen to betray us", apparently a reference to his 1950 public statements and Congressional testimony. Historians Haynes, Klehr, and Vassiliev indicate that the assessment was an overstatement, however. With his carefully limited testimony before HUAC and in his unpublicized interviews with the Federal Bureau of Investigation it is instead charged that Pressman:

... Sidestepped most of his knowledge of the early days of the Communist underground in Washington and his own involvement with Soviet intelligence, first with Chambers's GRU network in the 1930s and later with the KGB. He had never been the classic 'spy' who stole documents. Neither his work in domestically oriented New Deal agencies in the early 1930s nor his later role as a labor lawyer gave him access to information of Soviet interest. Instead, he functioned as part of the KGB espionage support network, assisting and facilitating its officers and agents. He gambled that there would not be anyone to contradict his evasions and that government investigators would not be able to charge him with perjury. He won his bet ...

== Writings ==
Pressman left one posthumously published memoir, a microfiche transcript of a Columbia University oral history interview:

- The Reminiscences of Lee Pressman (1975)

== See also ==
- Cases listed on Wikisource
- Congress of Industrial Organizations
- Collective bargaining
- Soviet espionage in the United States
- List of American spies
- John Abt
- Whittaker Chambers
- Noel Field
- Harold Glasser
- John Herrmann
- Alger Hiss
- Donald Hiss
- Victor Perlo
- J. Peters
- Ward Pigman
- Vincent Reno
- Julian Wadleigh
- Harold Ware
- Nathaniel Weyl
- Harry Dexter White
- Nathan Witt
- Pressman (name)
