= Vital Center =

Phrase

The term Vital Center was coined by the Harvard historian Arthur M. Schlesinger Jr. in his 1949 book of that title.

Schlesinger first mentioned the term in a New York Times article in April 1948 titled “Not Left, Not Right, But a Vital Center.”

US President Bill Clinton started to use the phrase "vital center" in speeches given during his term of office. In 1997, Schlesinger noted in an article for Slate magazine that Clinton hoped to appropriate the term to mean "middle of the road" or something that his "DLC fans" might prefer its meaning to be, which would locate it "somewhere closer to Ronald Reagan than to Franklin D. Roosevelt." In the Slate article, Schlesinger strongly rejected that interpretation of the term:

In my view, as I have said elsewhere, that middle of the road is definitely not the vital center. It is the dead center.

— Arthur Schlesinger, "It's My Vital Center", Slate magazine

He would later reiterate this argument in his 1998 introduction, objecting to the domestic use of the phrase:

"Vital center" refers to the contest between democracy and totalitarianism, not to contests within democracy between liberalism and conservatism, not at all to the so-called "middle of the road" preferred by cautious politicians of our own time. The middle of the road is definitely not the vital center: it is the dead center. Within democracy the argument adheres to FDR's injunction to move always "a little to the left of center."

— Arthur Schlesinger, from "Introduction to the Transaction Edition" of The Vital Center (page xiii, 1998 edition)

In 2022, Oxford University Press published a book called What Happened to the Vital Center? Presidentialism, Populist Revolt, and the Fracturing of America, a reexamination of Schlesinger’s book.
