= Shapley =

Shapley is a surname that might refer to one of the following:

- Lieutenant General Alan Shapley (1903–1973), of the U.S. Marine Corps, was a survivor the sinking of the USS Arizona in the attack on Pearl Harbor
- Harlow Shapley (1885–1972), American astronomer, married to Martha
- Martha Betz Shapley (1890–1981), American astronomer, married to Harlow
- Mildred Shapley Matthews (1915–2016), American astronomy writer, daughter of Harlow and Martha
- Willis Shapley (1917–2005), American administrator for NASA, son of Harlow and Martha
- Lloyd Shapley (1923–2016), Nobel-winning American mathematician and economist, son of Harlow and Martha
- Alice E. Shapley, American astronomer

Shapley may also refer to:

- the Shapley Supercluster
- Shapley (crater), a lunar impact crater on the southern edge of Mare Crisium

Concepts in game theory related to Lloyd Shapley:

- Shapley value and the Aumann–Shapley value
- Shapley–Shubik power index
- Gale–Shapley algorithm
