= Progressive Citizens of America =

American democratic socialist organization

Progressive Citizens of America (PCA)
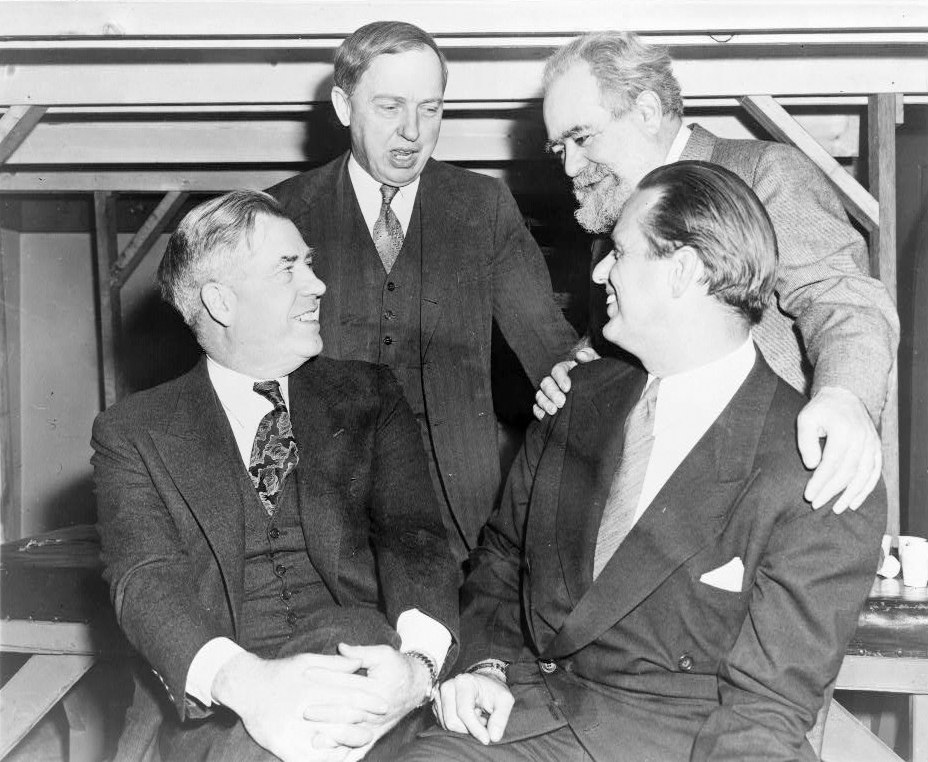
- Progressive Citizens of America members supported Wallace and Progressive Party. From left are seated, Henry A. Wallace and FDR's son Elliott Roosevelt; standing are Dr. Harlow Shapley and Jo Davidson (1947)
- Successor: Progressive Party (1948)
- Formation: December 1946
- Dissolved: 1948
- Merger of: Independent Citizens Committee of the Arts, Sciences and Professions (ICCASP); National Citizens Political Action Committee (NC-PAC)
- Purpose: Create third American political party
- Headquarters: New York City
- Members: 100,000
- Co-Chair: Jo Davidson
- Co-Chair: Frank Kingdon
- Co-vice chair: Philip Murray
- Co-vice chair: Alexander F. Whitney
- Key people: Elinor S. Gimbel, Anita McCormick Blaine, C.B. "Beanie" Baldwin, John Abt, Lee Pressman

Progressive Citizens of America (PCA) was a social-democratic and democratic socialist American political organization formed in December 1946 that advocated progressive policies, which worked with the Congress of Industrial Organizations (CIO) and allegedly the Communist Party USA (CPUSA), as a precursor to the 1948 incarnation of the Progressive Party. It also led to formation of a counter group called Americans for Democratic Action (ADA), formed in January 1947 with progressive domestic views but anti-communist and interventionist foreign policy views, that split liberals and nearly cost Harry S. Truman the 1948 United States presidential election. The organization was dissolved in 1948.

== History ==
In 1944, Elinor S. Gimbel founded a Popular Front group called the Non-Partisan Committee to support Franklin Delano Roosevelt's 1944 presidential campaign. That committee folded into the National Citizens Political Action Committee (NC-PAC), an arm of the Congress of Industrial Organizations - Political Action Committee (or CIO-PAC). Anita McCormick Blaine was also a major supporter of the NC-PAC.

Meanwhile, in 1946 (recalled Arthur M. Schlesinger Jr., an opponent of the PCA, in a 2002 memoir) the Communist Party USA under Eugene Dennis had decided to create a third party for the 1948 presidential election. Bella Dodd described some of those CPUSA decisions in her 1954 memoir.

Guided by Herbert Croly, founder of The New Republic magazine, the PCA formed from the NC-PAC and the Independent Citizens Committee of the Arts, Sciences and Professions (ICCASP). The primary driver for their merger was funding: rather than compete for the same pool, they would merge. Former US Vice President Henry A. Wallace and former New York City Mayor Fiorello LaGuardia spoke at the PCA's founding convention in December 1946.

The Montana Farmers Union (MFU) and the Montana Council for Progressive Political Action (MCPPA) were some of the first organizations to endorse the PCA. Within six months of operations, the PCA had gained some 25,000 members.

The PCA opposed the Truman Doctrine and Loyalty Boards; it gave limited, qualified support to the Marshall Plan. The ADA fully supported the Marshall Plan. Otherwise, "ADA and PCA were in substantial agreement on domestic issues."

By Summer 1947, the PCA had decided to make Henry A. Wallace its candidate for US president.

By June 21, 1947, the House Un-American Activities Committee held its first hearing about the PCA.

From July 9 to July 13, 1947, the Southern California Chapter of the PCA held a Thought Control Conference at the Beverly Hills Hotel that was sponsored by the Arts, Sciences and Professions Council of the PCA. The conference was in response to what the Chapter saw as "an alarming trend to control the cultural life of the American people." Among the known attendees and participants were people considered to be professionals and experts in their fields at the time (and a few to this day). Many were also well-known and included several Hollywood stars.

On October 15, 1947, Eleanor Roosevelt attacked the PCA in her "My Day" column:

It is a strange thing that groups of our own citizens, supposedly liberals, and the new (old) Information Bureau of the Communist Parties of Europe, which we ordinarily allude to as the Comintern, are condemning with one voice the Marshall proposals!... Our own section of liberals who, with the Progressive Citizens of America, follow so closely the arguments put out by the Comintern do themselves harm, for they offer nothing constructive and this increases in many less radical but liberal groups the sense of suspicion and uncertainty regarding the influences under which they operate.

In 1948, the PCA backed Henry A. Wallace as candidate for US President of a new, third iteration of an American Progressive Party (the two proceeding Progressive parties being nicknamed the "Bull Moose Party of 1912 and the LaFolette Party of 1924). By January 1948, with Wallace as its candidate, the PCA claimed to have some 100,000 members.

During Summer 1948, William Z. Foster, head of the CPUSA, came out in favor of Wallace.

The PCA was unwillingly responsible in part for the final downfall of Popular Front organizations, as its counterpart ADA "attracted liberal intellectuals who wanted to purge the left of all Communist Party influences. Its militant opposition to the PCA delivered the coup de grace." The ADA did so by characterizing the PCA as an "unholy alliance of Communists and reactionaries."

In February 1948, the PCA merged with the "Independent Progressive Party" (at least in California).

== People ==
=== Leadership ===
At its formation, the PCA comprised:

- Co-chairs: Jo Davidson, Frank Kingdon
- Co-vice chairs: Philip Murray, Alexander F. Whitney
- Co-executive vice presidents: Hannah Dorner, C.B. "Beanie" Baldwin
- Youth Division head: Gene Kelly
- Legal advisors: John Abt, Lee Pressman

By May 1947, C.B. "Beanie" Baldwin ran the PCA's daily operations.

Hugh De Lacy headed the PCA in the state of Washington at some time; Thomas G. Moore was executive secretary there.

=== Members ===
PCA members included Dalton Trumbo, Charlotta Bass, Edward Biberman, Philip N. Connelly, Earl Robinson, Charles Katz, Robert W. Kenny, John Howard Lawson, Harold Orr, Dr. Linus Pauling, and Frank Tuttle. Actor Edward G. Robinson was a vocal PCA member. Lillian Hellman, Dashiell Hammett, and Elinor S. Gimbel were members and at some point vice chairs. James Cagney, Frank Sinatra, Bette Davis, Olivia de Havilland, Agnes de Mille, Paul Robeson, Lena Horne, and Canada Lee were members. Southern California attorney Edward Mosk was also an active member. Mrs. S. Glidden Loomis was a member of the Legislative Committee in New York City for the PCA. Chester Kinsey of the Montana PCA led the Wallace campaign in that state.

In 1947–1948, Robert M. Lindner served as the Maryland state chairman of the PCA, which then became the state organization for Henry A. Wallace's quixotic 1948 third-party presidential campaign. In 1948 he was added to the national board of the PCA.

On February 21, 1950, actor Gregory Peck testified that he had been a PCA member and had resigned when offered to join its executive board, at which time he learned more about how its "true aims and activities were subversive."

On September 17, 1954, Mrs. Lynn Akerstein testified in Los Angeles that she had joined the PCA in June 1947 as an executive secretary, where she stayed until February 1948. At that time, the PCA merged with the Independent Progressive Party, and Akerstein rolled over as county director. She also stated that the CPUSA influenced the PCA "to very little extent."

== Funding ==
Major funding for the PCA came from Anita McCormick Blaine of Chicago (a daughter and heiress of Cyrus McCormick) and Elinor S. Gimbel (wife of Louis S. Gimbel Jr., an heir of the Gimbel brothers department store).

Lesser funding came from Lillian Hellman and Norman Mailer.

== Publications ==
- The PCA published Progressive Citizen.
- A 1947, 432-page, limited numbered (of 250) first edition hardbound book titled Thought Control in U.S.A. This was "The collected proceedings of the Conference on the Subject of Thought Control in the U.S., called by the Hollywood Arts, Sciences & Professions Council, PCA, July 9–13, 1947."

== Research ==
The top source on the PCA remains Curtis D. MacDougall's three-volume book Gideon's Army:

- Volume 1: The components of the decision
- Volume 2: The decision and the organization
- Volume 3: The campaign and the vote

== See also ==
- Independent Citizens Committee of the Arts, Sciences and Professions
- National Council of Arts, Sciences and Professions
- Progressivism in the United States
- Progressive Party (United States, 1948)
- Henry A. Wallace
- Elinor S. Gimbel
- Anita McCormick Blaine
- Lillian Hellman
