= June Lorraine Matthews =

American nuclear physicist (born 1939)

- Born: August 1, 1939 (age 86)
- Parents: Ralph Matthews (father); Mildred Shapley Matthews (mother)
- Relatives: Harlow Shapley (grandfather), Martha Betz Shapley (grandmother), Willis Shapley (uncle), Lloyd Shapley (uncle)
- Scientific career
- Fields: Physics
- Institutions: MIT
- Thesis: The high energy nuclear photoeffect in light elements (1967)
- Doctoral advisor: William Bertozzi
- Doctoral students: Marla Dowell

June Lorraine Matthews (born August 1, 1939) is an American nuclear physicist.

== Career ==
June Lorraine Matthews was born August 1, 1939, to Mildred and Ralph Matthews and is the eldest granddaughter of Harlow Shapley.

Matthews completed her undergraduate degree in Physics at Carleton College, Northfield, Minnesota in 1960 and her PhD in 1967, titled The high energy nuclear photoeffect in light elements. She did postdoctoral fellowships at University of Glasgow, Scotland and Rutgers University, New Jersey. She became a member of staff at MIT in 1973. In 1984 she became a Fellow of the American Physical Society. From 1994 to 1998 she was Academic Officer in the Physics Department at MIT. In 2000 she was made director of Laboratory for Nuclear Science at MIT.

In 2021 she edited and released a memoir about her grandfather, Harlow Shapley, which had been written by her mother, Mildred Shapley Matthews.

== Selected publications ==
=== Papers ===
- Pasyuk, E.A.; Boudrie, R.L.; Gram, P.A.M.; Morris, C.L.; Zumbro, J.D.; Matthews, J.L.; Tan, Y.; Zelevinsky, V.V.; Glass, G.; Kriss, B.J. (2001). "A study of the Δ−-component of the wave function in light nuclei". Physics Letters B. 523 (1–2): 1–5. arXiv:nucl-ex/9912004. doi:10.1016/S0370-2693(01)01329-6. S2CID 119493593.
- Safkan, Y.; Akdogan, T.; Franklin, W. A.; Matthews, J. L.; Schmitt, W. M.; Zelevinsky, V. V.; Gram, P. A. M.; Taddeucci, T. N.; Wender, S. A.; Pate, S. F. (2007). "Differential cross section for neutron-proton bremsstrahlung". Phys. Rev. C. 75 (3) 031001. arXiv:nucl-ex/0701009. Bibcode:2007PhRvC..75c1001S. doi:10.1103/PhysRevC.75.031001. S2CID 119374635.
- "Experimental Searches for Pre-Existing Delta Components in Nuclear Wave Functions". Proceedings of the Second Workshop on Electronuclear Physics and Internal Targets and the BLAST Detector. 1999.

=== Books edited ===
- Matthews, Mildred Shapley (2021). June Matthews, Thomas Bogdan (ed.). Shapley's round table: A memoir by the astronomer's daughter. BookBaby. ISBN 978-1-0983-8356-5.
