= Independent Citizens Committee of the Arts, Sciences and Professions =

American advocacy association

Independent Citizens Committee of the Arts, Sciences and Professions (ICCASP)
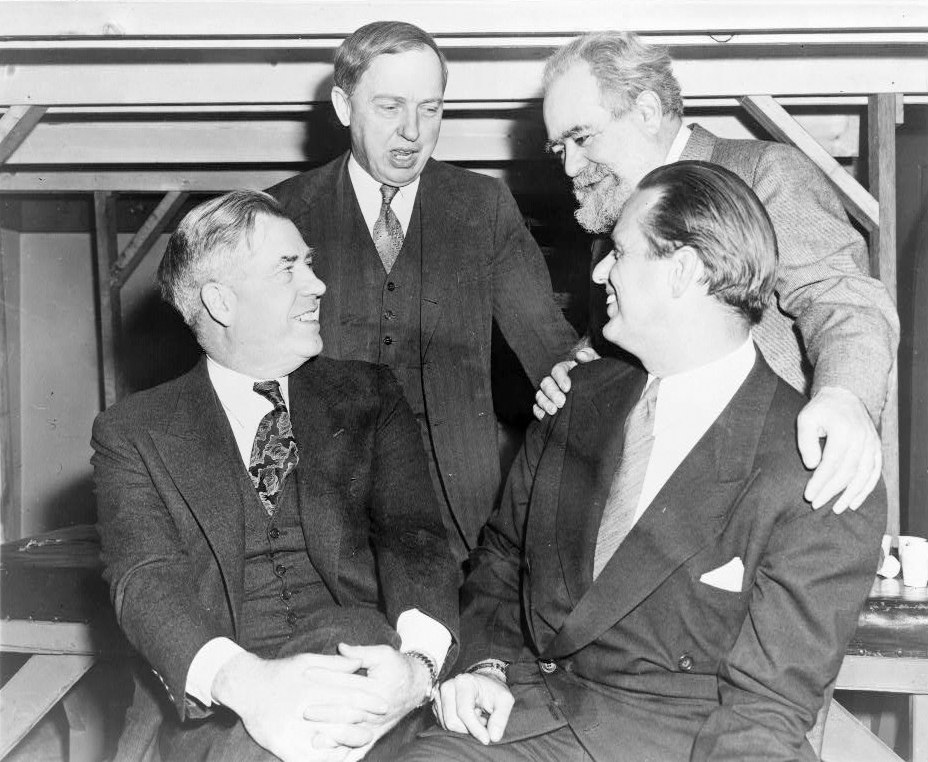
- ICCASP chair Jo Davidson and member Harlow Shapley stand behind fellow Progressive Citizens of America members supporting former US Vice President Henry A. Wallace and his Progressive Party: from left seated, Wallace and FDR's son Elliott Roosevelt (1947)
- Merged into: Progressive Citizens of America
- Formation: June 1945
- Dissolved: December 1946
- Purpose: Create third American political party
- Headquarters: New York City
- Members: 100,000
- Chair: Jo Davidson
- Executive Chair: Harold Ickes
- Board of directors: Leonard Bernstein, Eddie Cantor, Duke Ellington, John Hersey, Gene Kelly, Thomas Mann, Linus Pauling, Eleanor Roosevelt, Frank Sinatra

The Independent Citizens Committee of the Arts, Sciences and Professions (ICCASP) (1945–1946) was an American association that lobbied unofficially for New Deal causes, as well as the cause of world peace; members included future US President Ronald Reagan. Some members would later be accused of infiltrating the group to spread socialist, and occasionally pro-Soviet Communist ideas. The group included a chapter sometimes called the "Hollywood Independent Citizens Committee of the Arts, Sciences and Professions" (HICCASP) involved in the Hollywood Ten.

== Organization ==
January 1946 national group:

- Chair: Jo Davidson
- Treasurer: Fredric March
- Members of the national board of directors: Olivia de Havilland, William Rose Benét, Van Wyck Brooks, Louis Calhern, Marc Connelly, John Cromwell, Morris Llewellyn Cooke, Norman Corwin, Bartley Crum, Dr. Moses Diamond, Donald du Shank, Albert Einstein, Florence Eldridge, Rudolph Ganz, Moss Hart, Lillian Hellman, Howard Koch, John Howard Lawson, Archibald MacLeish, John T. McManus, William Morris, Alonzo F. Myers, John P. Peters, Paul Robeson, Harlow Shapley, Herman Shumlin, Carl Van Doren

Other sources:

- National:
  - Executive chair: Harold Ickes
  - Chair: Jo Davidson
  - Board members: Frank Sinatra, Thomas Mann, Duke Ellington, Eleanor Roosevelt; Leonard Bernstein, Eddie Cantor, John Hersey, Gene Kelly, Linus Pauling
- Chapters:
  - New York: Hannah Dorner (executive director), Edward Condon
  - Hollywood: Linus Pauling (vice president)

== Members ==
- National: Harlow Shapley
- New York: Hannah Dorner
- Hollywood: Humphrey Bogart, Charlie Chaplin, Rita Hayworth, Charles Laughton, Irving Pichel, Linus Pauling, Ronald Reagan, Orson Welles
- Others "associated": James Cagney, Aaron Copland, Oscar Hammerstein, Walter Huston, Canada Lee, Edward G. Robinson

== History ==
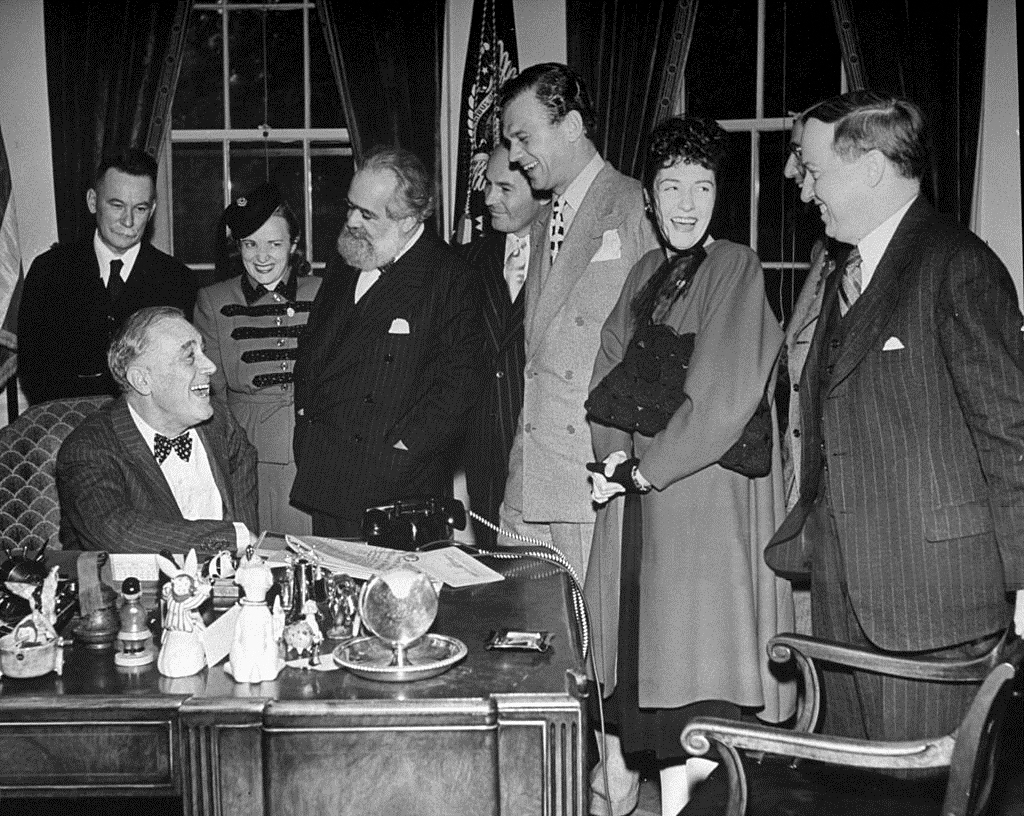
Members of ICCASP precursor Independent Voters Committee of the Arts and Sciences for Roosevelt visit FDR at White House (October 1944), from left: Van Wyck Brooks, Hannah Dorner, Jo Davidson, Jan Kiepura, Joseph Cotten, Dorothy Gish, Harlow Shapley.

The ICCASP started in 1944, as an "Independent Voters Committee of the Arts and Sciences for Roosevelt" (IVCASR).

After FDR's successful fourth election as US President in November 1944, the group formalized itself with professional staff.

The ICCASP formed in 1945 shortly after the end of World War II. From the start, the group found itself at odds with the Truman administration's "aggressive anti-Soviet" and anti-labor policies, as well as his accommodation to racism. Tied to a primary issue of global peace was the issue of atomic power and, more immediately, a "May-Johnson Bill" started in June 1945 that would become the Atomic Energy Act of 1946 (signed August 1, 1946). In November 1945, scientist Linus Pauling spoke to the group on atomic weapons; shortly after, his wife Ava Helen and he accepted membership.

In late 1945, the ICCASP's Hollywood chapter ("HICCASP") published a scathing critique of Dies Committee chairman, entitled Introducing... Representative John E. Rankin.

On January 21, 1946, the group met to discuss academic freedom, during which Pauling said, "There is, of course, always a threat to academic freedom – as there is to the other aspects of the freedom and rights of the individual, in the continued attacks which are made on this freedom, these rights, by the selfish, the overly ambitious, the misguided, the unscrupulous, who seek to oppress the great body of mankind in order that they themselves may profit – and we must always be on the alert against this threat, and must fight it with vigor when it becomes dangerous."

Also in January 1946, ICCASP's Theatre Division, headed by actor José Ferrer, held a discussion on "Artist as Citizen" at the Henry Miller Theatre that featured US Rep. Joseph Clark Baldwin, war correspondent Quentin Reynolds, and Marxist economist J. Raymond Walsh.

In February 1946, Desi Arnaz appeared in a show sponsored by the ICCASP, "a group the FBI said was a communist front."

Ronald Reagan, then politically more a liberal, was a member of ICCASP's Hollywood chapter. Fellow actors, mostly Roosevelt supporters, like Olivia de Havilland, Bette Davis, Gregory Peck and Humphrey Bogart were also in its Hollywood chapter. In 2006, De Havilland described her reason for joining: "I thought, 'I'll join and try to be a good citizen." In June 1946, De Havilland was asked to deliver speeches that she felt seemed to come from the Communist Party line. She refused to deliver the speeches and rewrote them, this time championing President Truman's anti-Communist program. De Havilland described that in meetings of the Citizens' Group, the group rarely embraced the kind of independent spirit it publicly proclaimed, as it always ended up siding with the Soviet Union, even though the rank-and-file members were noncommunist: "I thought, 'If we reserve the right to criticize the American policies, why don't we reserve the right to criticize Russia?'" When reform efforts failed, a number of prominent members from the liberal side like De Havilland and Ronald Reagan left in 1946, causing the ICCASP to be seen increasingly as a Communist front group.

In September 1946, ICCASP joined the CIO-PAC, the National Citizens PAC (NCPAC), the NAACP, the Railroad Brothers, the National Farmers Union, and the Southern Conference for Human Welfare for a Chicago Conference of Progressives. The Union for Democratic Action did not participate because of perceived Communist infiltration.

On September 24, 1946, the ICCASP issued a joint declaration with CIO-PAC that opposed the Baruch Plan. A few months earlier, on June 14, 1946, Baruch (US representative to the United Nations Atomic Energy Commission) (UNAEC) had presented his plan as a modified version of the Acheson–Lilienthal plan; it proposed international control of then-new atomic energy. The USSR rejected Baruch's proposal as unfair (given the fact that the US already had nuclear weapons) and counter-proposed that the US eliminate its nuclear arsenal. The ICCASP (like the Soviets) opposed the Baruch Plan. By October 1946, Ickes was urging the ICCASP to reconsider its position on atomic energy. The ICCASP's position on nuclear arms, plus Republican victories in the 1946 mid-term elections, led members like Ickes to resign "because of perceived Communist domination of the organization." (Baruch resigned from the UNAEC in 1947 as he grew further out of step with the views of the Truman administration.)

On November 14, 1946, scientist Harlow Shapley appeared under subpoena by the House Un-American Activities Committee for his role as a member of ICCASP, a "major political arm of the Russophile left", specifically about ICCASP's Massachusetts's chapter, and also for opposing U.S. Representative Joseph William Martin Jr. during mid-term elections that year. HUAC committee chairman John E. Rankin commented, "I have never seen a witness treat a committee with more contempt" and considered contempt of Congress charges. Shapley accused HUAC of "Gestapo methods" and advocated for its abolition for making "civic cowards of many citizens" by pursuing the "bogey of political radicalism."

On December 26, 1946, ICCASP and the National Citizens PAC merged to form the Progressive Citizens of America (PCA). In his 1993 memoir, John J. Abt (CPUSA legal counsel in the 1950s), recalled negotiating the merger with Calvin Benham Baldwin ("Beanie Baldwin") and Hannah Dorner. A week later, the Union for Democratic Action reformed as Americans for Democratic Action and took an anti-Communist stance against the PCA. "The split in liberal ranks had become a chasm."

== Legacy ==
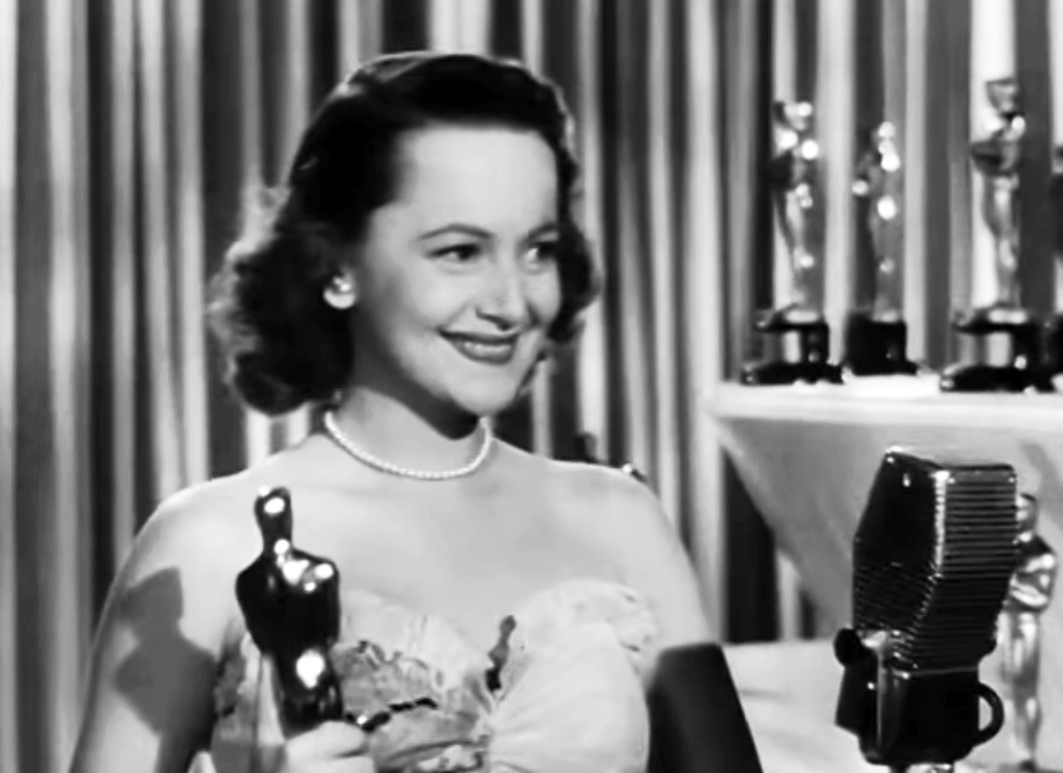
Olivia de Havilland (1946) accepting Oscars around the time she was an ICCASP member

From its start, the ICCASP found itself overlapping in mission with the Artists League of America (ALA), successor of the American Artists' Congress (ACA).

In 1947, the ICCASP came under attack by the House Un-American Activities Committee (HUAC) during congressional hearings on communist infiltration in Hollywood, which led to the indictment of the Hollywood Ten.

In 1948, the ICCASP and National Citizens PAC merged and supported former US Vice President Henry A. Wallace as presidential candidate for the Progressive Party (United States, 1948).

On August 2, 1948, Louis F. Budenz testified before the Senate subcommittee of the Committee of Expenditures in the Executive Department:

The Independent [Citizens] Committee of the Arts, Sciences, and Professions was worked out originally in my office in the Daily Worker, of which Lionel Berman, of the cultural section organizer of the party, was a member, and he was entrusted not only by that meeting but by the political committee, as the result of these discussions with the task of forming the Independent Citizens Committee of the Arts, Sciences, and Professions.

HUAC published details from Budenz's testimony regarding the "National Council of the Arts, Sciences, and Professions," which (according to HUAC) was a "descendant" of ICCASP.

In the 1950s, many former ICCASP members found themselves hounded for communist subversive activities during McCarthyism. For example, scientist Linus Pauling found himself under investigation by the Federal Bureau of Investigation (FBI), HUAC, and internal groups at Caltech, where he worked.

== Works ==
- The Independent (CPUSA), bimonthly, ICCASP New York
- ICCASP news letter (June 1946)
- Don't You Believe It, HICCASP (1946)
- Report From Washington, monthly, IAACP New York (1949)

== See also ==
- Atomic Energy Act of 1946
- Progressive Citizens of America
- National Council of Arts, Sciences and Professions
- Henry A. Wallace
- Progressive Party (United States, 1948)
- English-language press of the Communist Party USA
- List of organizations described as Communist fronts by the United States federal government
