= Marla Dowell =

American physicist

Marla L. Dowell
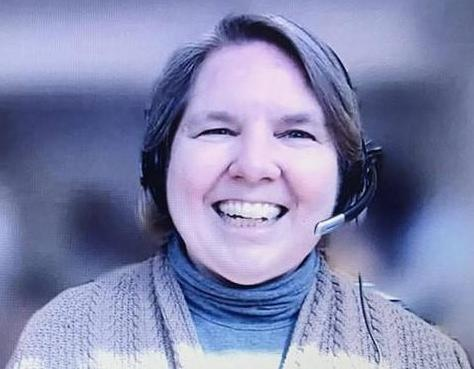
- Dowell, NIST photograph, 2022
- Born: 1965 (age 60–61)
- Education: University of Michigan; Massachusetts Institute of Technology; University of Colorado Boulder
- Scientific career
- Workplaces: JILA; NIST; Dartmouth
- Thesis: Pion single charge exchange in three body nuclei at intermediate energies

Marla L. Dowell (born 1965) is an American physicist who is the Executive Director of the EDGE Consortium.

== Early life and education ==
Dowell became interested in science and mathematics as a child. Her father is an engineer and her step-father was a physicist. Dowell was an undergraduate in physics at the University of Michigan. She was encouraged by her physics professors to pursue a career in research. She moved to the Massachusetts Institute of Technology for doctoral research, where she worked under the supervision of June Lorraine Matthews. Her doctoral research considered pion single charge exchange. After earning her doctorate, Dowell joined JILA, where she worked as a postdoctoral research associate in atomic physics. Dowell has been a long-time advocate for STEM education. She earned a Master of Business Administration at the University of Colorado Boulder.

== Research and career ==
At National Institute of Standards and Technology, Dowell was responsible for the NIST laser metrology program. At the start, the group focused on calibration, but under her leadership, Dowell developed a research program in laser metrology for industrial applications. Connecting fundamental research to industry needs has been a unifying theme of Dowell's career – from optical metrology for semiconductor manufacturing to solving today's challenges with 5G deployment with new electromagnetic metrology. She has leveraged partnerships with other federal agencies to expand NIST research activities in wireless communication networks.

Dowell has written about job hunting strategies for navigating transitions between different STEM disciplines. She has been a long-time supporter of educational and career development opportunities, serving on both the APS Committee on Careers & Professional Development as well as SPIE Education and Outreach Committee.

In 2017, Dowell became director of the Communications Technology Laboratory and the NIST Boulder Laboratory. The National Academies have cited the strength and breadth of the NIST Communication Technology Laboratory programs under Dowell's leadership. In June 2023, Dowell joined CHIPS for America as director of the CHIPS Metrology Program, where she will expand and advance NIST's efforts to deliver a robust measurement science foundation for the semiconductor industry.

In 2023, Dowell was recognized by the President of the United States as a Distinguished Executive for her extraordinary and lasting contributions to scientific research and achievements as a leader in the NIST Community. Dowell is a Fellow of AAAS, IEEE, and SPIE.

In 2025, Dowell was appointed Executive Director of the EDGE Consortium, a collaborative network of leading research universities dedicated to transforming semiconductor-related education and workforce development. The consortium’s mission is to align educational programs with industry needs, foster and promote an innovative workforce, and significantly expand the engineering workforce for the semiconductor industry. Its core pillars—Recruit, Retrain, and Retain—guide efforts to attract diverse talent, upskill the existing workforce, and ensure long-term retention in the semiconductor field.

== Awards and honors ==
- 2000 Judson C. French Award* 2000 Judson C. French Award
- 2005 Department of Commerce Silver Medal
- 2005 NIST Equal Employment Opportunity/Diversity Award
- 2010 Arthur S. Flemming Award
- 2012 Allen V. Astin Award
- 2016 SPIE Women in Optics
- 2019 OSA Diversity and Inclusion Advocacy Recognition
- 2023 SPIE Fellow
- 2023 Presidential Rank Award as Distinguished Executive
- 2024 AAAS Fellow
- 2026 IEEE Fellow
