= 1123 Shapleya =

Stony Florian asteroid

Discovery
- Discovered by: G. Neujmin
- Discovery site: Simeiz Obs.
- Discovery date: 21 September 1928

Designations
- Named after: Harlow Shapley (American astronomer)
- Alternative designations: 1928 ST · 1974 QQ_{2} 2016 FJ_{6}
- Minor planet category: main-belt · Flora

Orbital characteristics
- Epoch 16 February 2017 (JD 2457800.5)
- Uncertainty parameter 0
- Observation arc: 87.81 yr (32,073 days)
- Aphelion: 2.5741 AU
- Perihelion: 1.8758 AU
- Semi-major axis: 2.2250 AU
- Eccentricity: 0.1569
- Orbital period (sidereal): 3.32 yr (1,212 days)
- Mean anomaly: 207.68°
- Mean motion: 0° 17^{m} 49.2^{s} / day
- Inclination: 6.4212°
- Longitude of ascending node: 79.889°
- Argument of perihelion: 317.60°

Physical characteristics
- Dimensions: 10.93±2.29 km 11.282±0.136 km 12.003±0.092 km 12.08 km (taken); 12.084 km 12.32±0.84 km
- Synodic rotation period: 20 h (dated); 24 h (dated); 52.92±0.01 h
- Geometric albedo: 0.2600±0.0630; 0.274±0.044; 0.278±0.037; 0.2797; 0.36±0.19
- Spectral type: S
- Absolute magnitude (H): 11.55±0.29 · 11.59±0.13 · 11.60 · 11.7

1123 Shapleya, provisional designation 1928 ST, is a stony Florian asteroid from the inner regions of the asteroid belt, approximately 11 kilometers in diameter. It was discovered on 21 September 1928, by Russian astronomer Grigory Neujmin at Simeiz Observatory on the Crimean peninsula. It was named after American astronomer Harlow Shapley.

== Orbit and classification ==
Shapleya is a S-type asteroid and member of the Flora family of stony asteroids, one of the largest families of the main belt. It orbits the Sun at a distance of 1.9–2.6 AU once every 3 years and 4 months (1,212 days). Its orbit has an eccentricity of 0.16 and an inclination of 6° with respect to the ecliptic. As no precoveries were taken, and no prior identifications were made, the body's observation arc begins with its official discovery observation at Simeiz.

== Lightcurves ==
In November 2011, the so-far best rated rotational lightcurve of was obtained by American astronomer Robert Stephens at the Center for Solar System Studies in California. Lightcurve analysis gave a rotation period of 52.92 hours with a brightness variation of 0.38 magnitude (U=3-), superseding observations by Wiesław Z. Wiśniewski and a group of French, Italian and Swiss astronomers, that gave a shorter period of 20 and 24 hours, respectively (U=2/2). Shapleya has a relatively slow rotation period, as most minor planets have a spin rate between 2 and 20 hours.

== Diameter and albedo ==
According to the surveys carried out by the Japanese Akari satellite and NASA's Wide-field Infrared Survey Explorer with its subsequent NEOWISE mission, Shapleya measures between 10.93 and 12.32 kilometers in diameter, and its surface has an albedo between 0.26 and 0.36. The Collaborative Asteroid Lightcurve Link adopts Petr Pravec's revised WISE data, that is, an albedo of 0.2797 and a diameter of 12.084 kilometers with an absolute magnitude of 11.59.

== Naming ==
This minor planet was named by the discoverer after Harlow Shapley (1885–1972), American astronomer and director of Harvard Observatory in Cambridge, Massachusetts. The lunar crater Shapley and the Shapley Supercluster are also named after him. Naming citation was first mentioned in The Names of the Minor Planets by Paul Herget in 1955 (H 105).
