= Picard (crater) =

Crater on the Moon

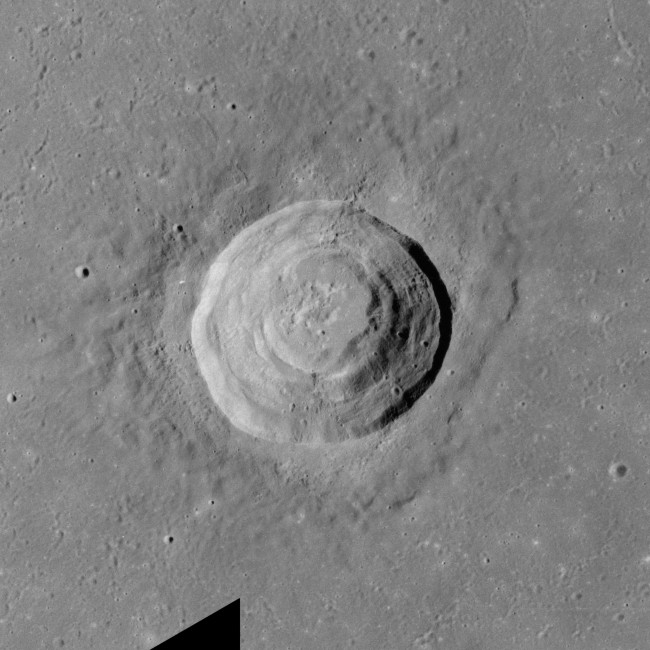
- Apollo 17 Mapping camera image
- Coordinates: 14.57°N 54.72°E
- Diameter: 22.35 km (13.89 mi)
- Depth: 2.4 km
- Colongitude: 306° at sunrise
- Formation: Eratosthenian
- Eponym: Jean-Félix Picard

Picard is a lunar impact crater that lies in Mare Crisium. The crater is named for 17th century French astronomer and geodesist Jean Picard. It is the biggest non-flooded crater of this mare, being slightly larger than Peirce to the north-northwest. To the west is the almost completely flooded crater Yerkes. To east of Picard is the tiny Curtis.

Picard is a crater from the Eratosthenian period, which lasted from 3.2 to 1.1 billion years ago. The roughly circular rim of Picard is well-defined and shows little sign of wear, having a sharp-edged appearance. On the inner wall are a series of layered terraces that seismologists have attributed to a collapse of the crater floor. It has a cluster of low hills at the bottom.

== Satellite craters ==
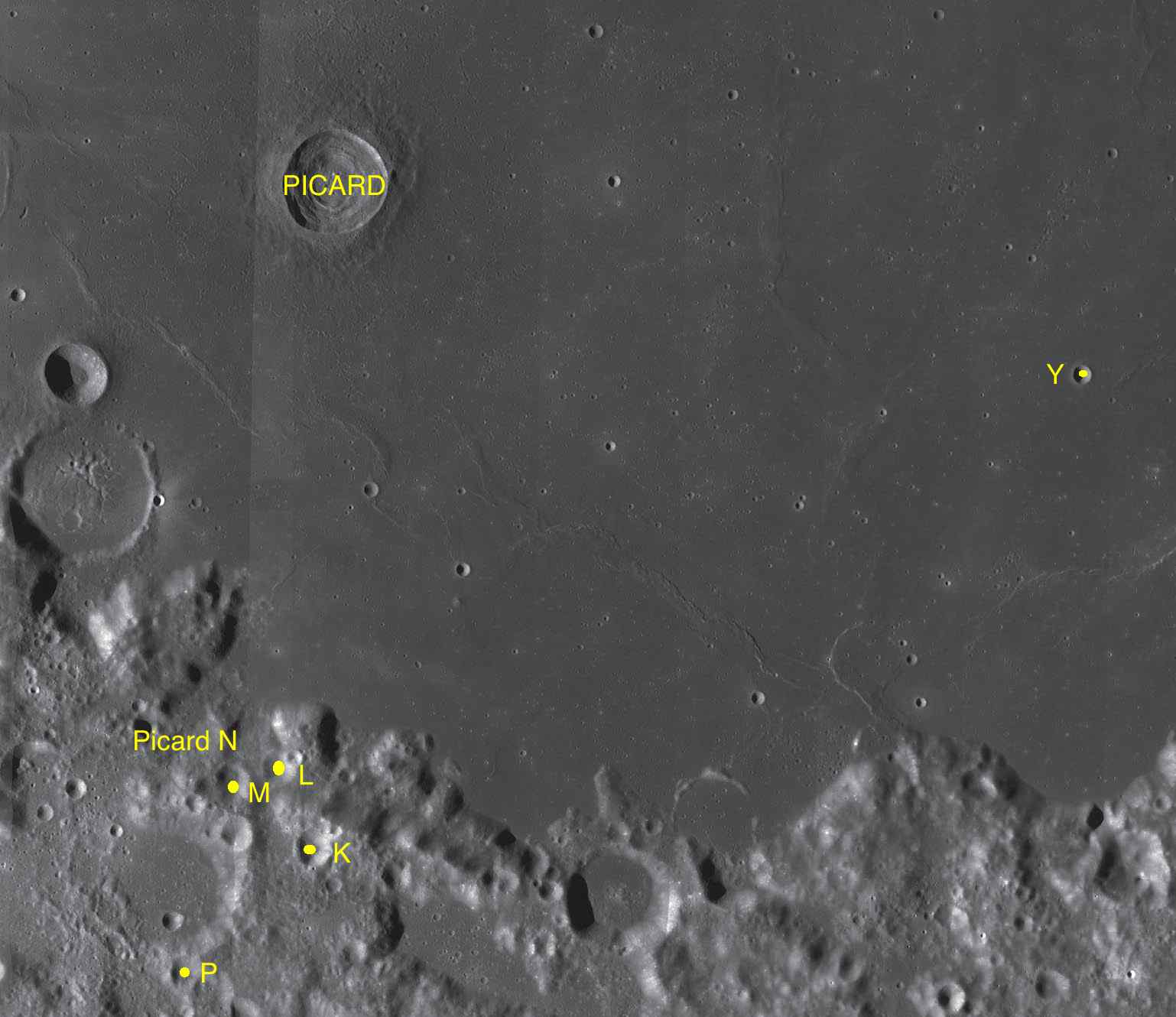
Satellite craters of Picard

By convention these features are identified on lunar maps by placing the letter on the side of the crater midpoint that is closest to Picard.

Picard	Coordinates	Diameter
K	9.73°N 54.56°E	9 km
L	10.32°N 54.31°E	7 km
M	10.21°N 53.95°E	8 km
N	10.52°N 53.57°E	19 km
P	8.82°N 53.62°E	8 km
Y	13.18°N 60.27°E	4 km

The following craters have been renamed by the IAU.

- Picard G — see Tebbutt.
- Picard H — see Shapley.
- Picard X — see Fahrenheit.
- Picard Z — see Curtis.

== Gallery ==
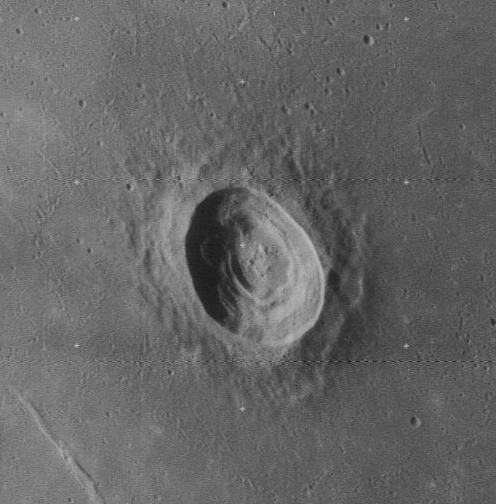
Oblique Lunar Orbiter 4 image

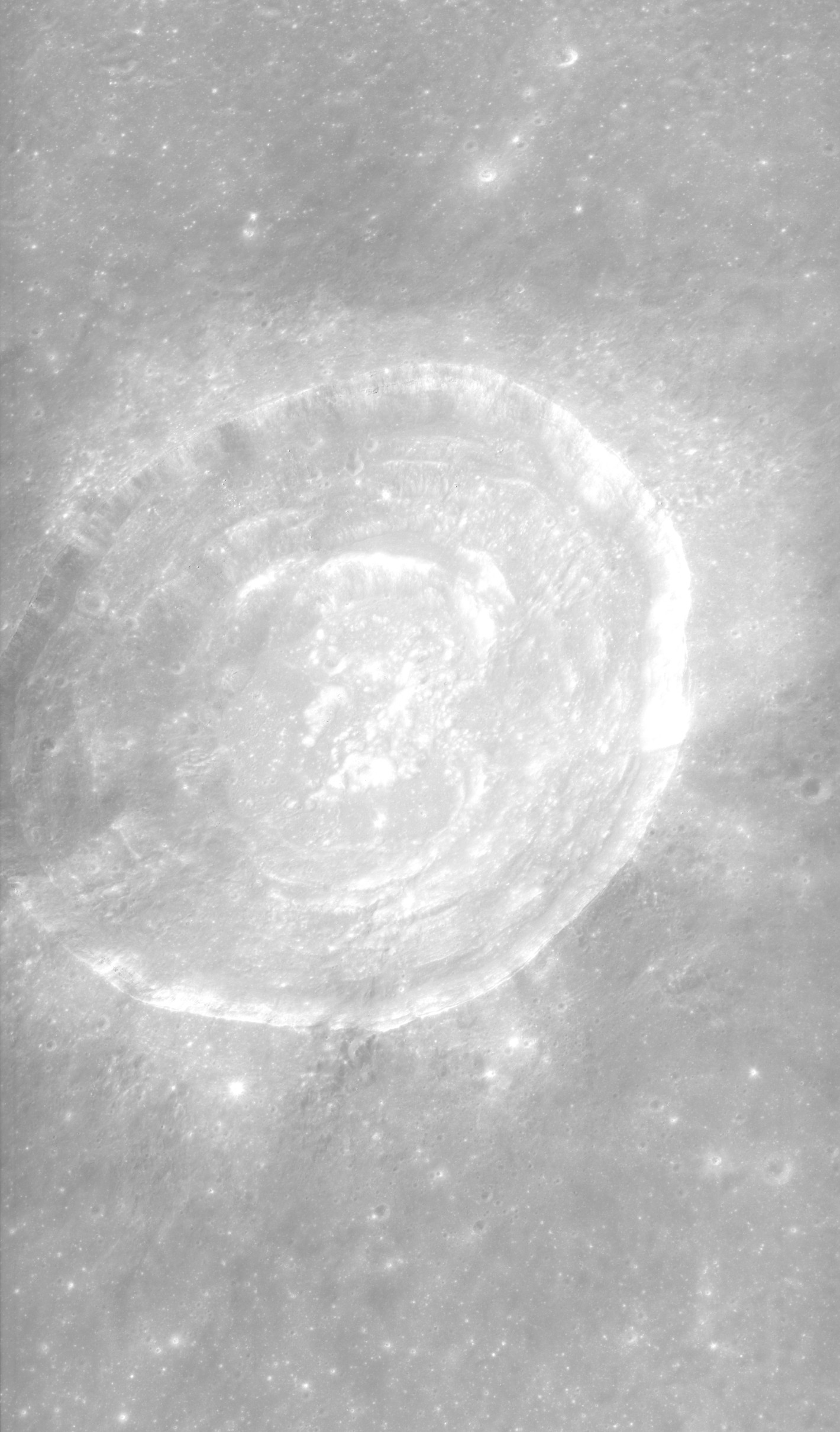
Oblique Apollo 15 Panoramic Camera image, facing south
