= Curtis (crater) =

Crater on the Moon

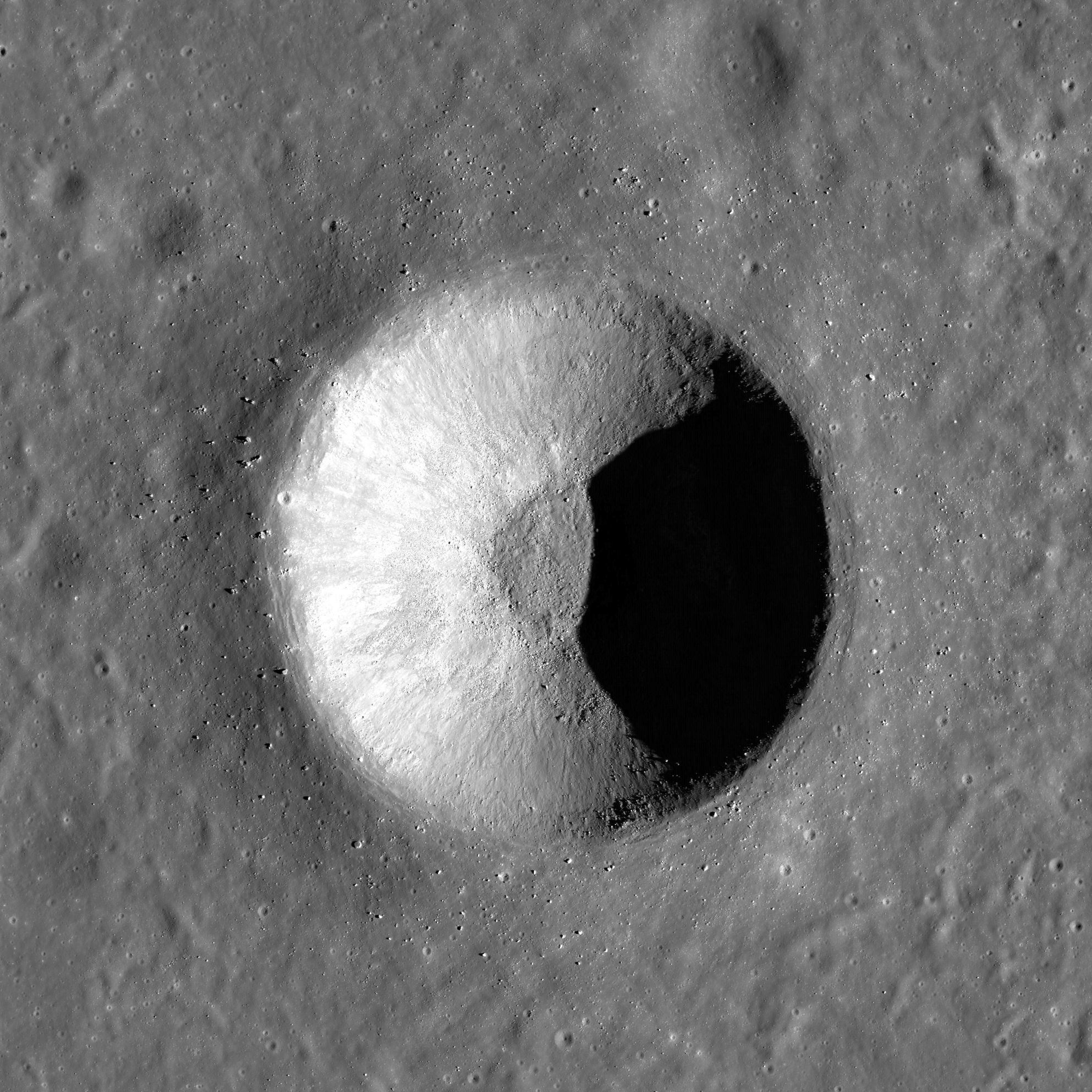
- LRO image
- Coordinates: 14.57°N 56.76°E
- Diameter: 2.88 km (1.79 mi)
- Depth: Unknown
- Colongitude: 187° at sunrise
- Eponym: Heber D. Curtis

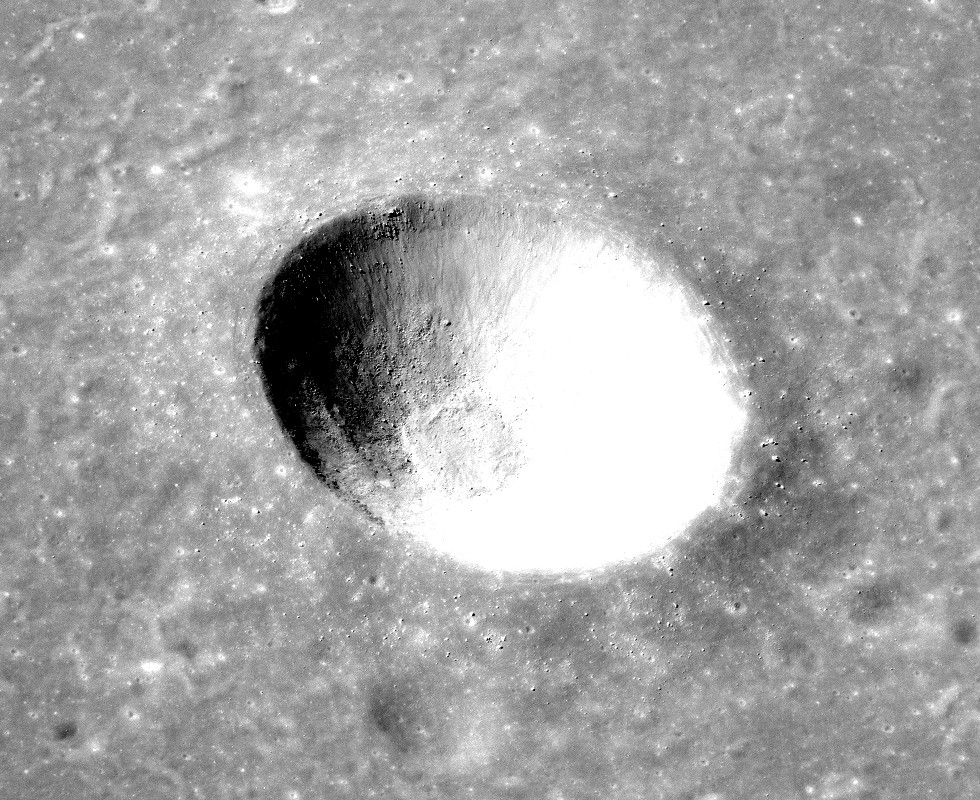
Apollo 17 image

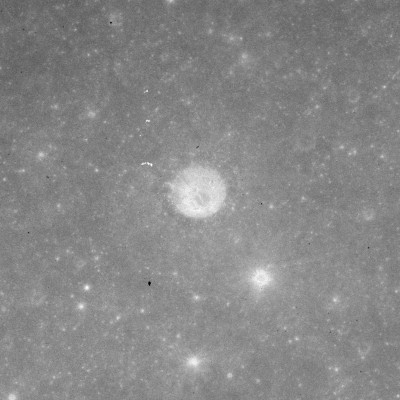
Apollo 15 image

Curtis is a very small lunar impact crater that lies in the southern Mare Crisium, to the east of the larger crater Picard. Curtis is a circular, cup-shaped formation that is otherwise undistinguished.

Previously designated Picard Z, this formation was named after American astronomer Heber D. Curtis (1872-1942). Its designation was officially adopted by the International Astronomical Union in 1973.
