= Shapley (crater) =

Crater on the Moon

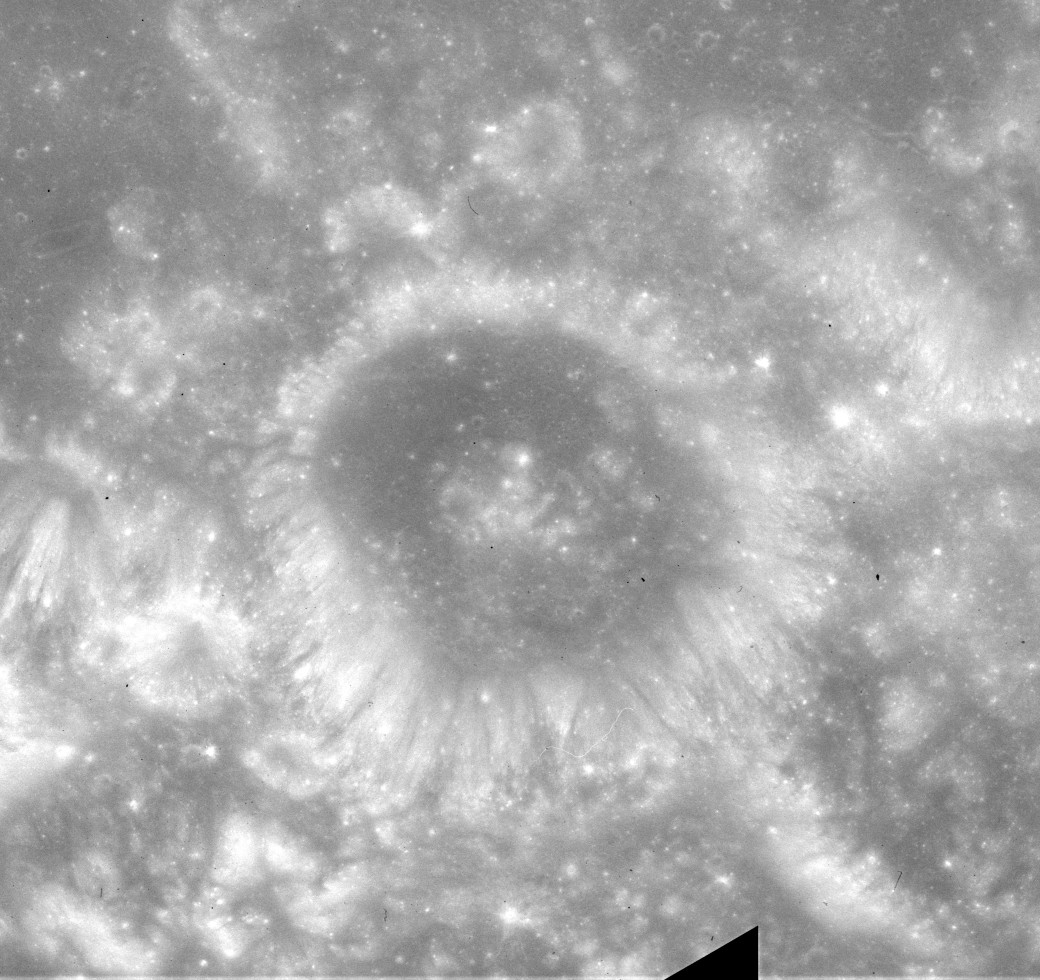
- Apollo 15 image
- Coordinates: 9.4°N 56.9°E
- Diameter: 23 km
- Colongitude: 304° at sunrise
- Eponym: Harlow Shapley

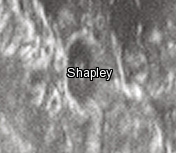
Shapley Crater as viewed from Earth on a telescope at the University of Hertfordshire's Bayfordbury Observatory

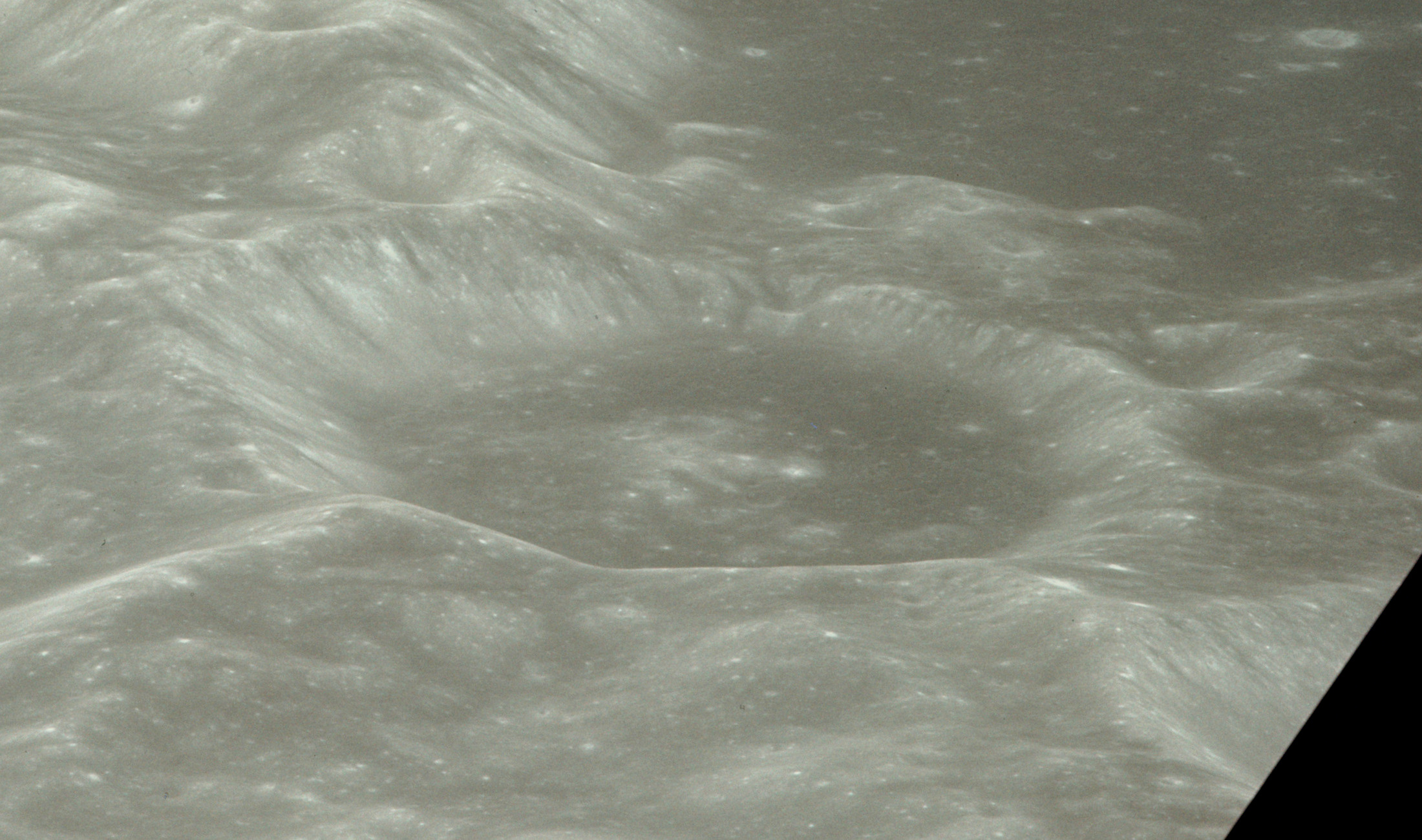
Oblique view from Apollo 17

Shapley is a lunar impact crater that lies along the southern edge of Mare Crisium. It was named after American astronomer Harlow Shapley. It was previously designated Picard H. However the crater Picard lies about 150 kilometers to the north-northwest across the Mare Crisium. Somewhat closer to this crater are Tebbutt to the west, and Firmicus to the east-southeast.

This crater is roughly circular, but appears somewhat oval when viewed from the Earth due to foreshortening. The interior wall is slightly wider in the southern half, and the outer ridge is attached to a ridge that leads to the south then southeast. The interior floor has a dark hue that matches the adjacent lunar mare, having a lower albedo than the terrain to the south. There is a low central peak near the midpoint of the floor.

== See also ==
- 1123 Shapleya, minor planet
- Shapley Supercluster
