= Calvin Benham Baldwin =

American politician (1902–1975)

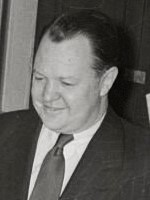
- Baldwin in 1948
- Born: August 19, 1902; Radford, Virginia, US
- Died: May 12, 1975 (aged 72); Bethesda, Maryland, US
- Other name: Beanie Baldwin
- Education: Virginia Polytechnic Institute
- Occupations: Government official, union and political activist
- Years active: 1923–1955
- Employer: New Deal government
- Known for: Administrator of New Deal's Farm Security Administration, 1948 campaign manager for Progressive Party's Henry A. Wallace, "accused of radicalism and of trying to 'communize American agriculture'" (NYT)
- Spouse(s): Louise Delp (first), Lillian Hoell (second)
- Children: 2

Calvin Benham Baldwin, also known as Calvin B Baldwin, C.B. Baldwin, and generally as "Beanie" Baldwin (August 19, 1902 – May 12, 1975), served as assistant to US Secretary of Agriculture Henry A. Wallace and administrator of the New Deal's Farm Security Administration in the 1930s, worked for the CIO in the 1940s, and then worked with the Progressive Party from 1948 to 1955.

== Background ==
Calvin Benham Baldwin was born on August 19, 1902, in Radford, Virginia. He attended the Virginia Polytechnic Institute from 1920 to 1923.

== Career ==
=== Early years (1923–1933) ===
For five years during the 1920s, he worked for the Norfolk and Western Railroad. In 1929, Baldwin became the manager and owner of the Electric Sales and Service Company in East Radford, Virginia.

=== Government service (1933–1943) ===
With the advent of the New Deal, Baldwin became assistant to Secretary of Agriculture Henry A. Wallace. He first worked with the Agricultural Adjustment Administration (AAA) and then as assistant to Rexford Tugwell for the Resettlement Administration, as of its founding in 1935.

In 1937, the Resettlement Administration became the Farm Security Administration (FSA). In 1940, Baldwin became FSA administrator. The FSA distributed low interest loans to small farmers and encouraged cooperatives.

=== CIO, CIO-PAC, NCPAC (1943–1948) ===
In 1943, Baldwin left government to work with the Congress of Industrial Organizations's Political Action Committee (CIO-PAC), headed by Sidney Hillman, president of the Amalgamated Clothing Workers of America and a long-time vice president of the CIO. He tried to secure labor vote for US President Franklin Delano Roosevelt.

In 1945, CIO-PAC founded the National Citizens Political Action Committee (NCPAC), a "liberal lobby" whose membership included communists. Baldwin became the NCPAC's executive vice-chairman and its "driving force." Critical of Truman, NCPAC and other liberal organizations united to form the Progressive Citizens of America (PCA).

=== Progressive Party (1948–1955) ===
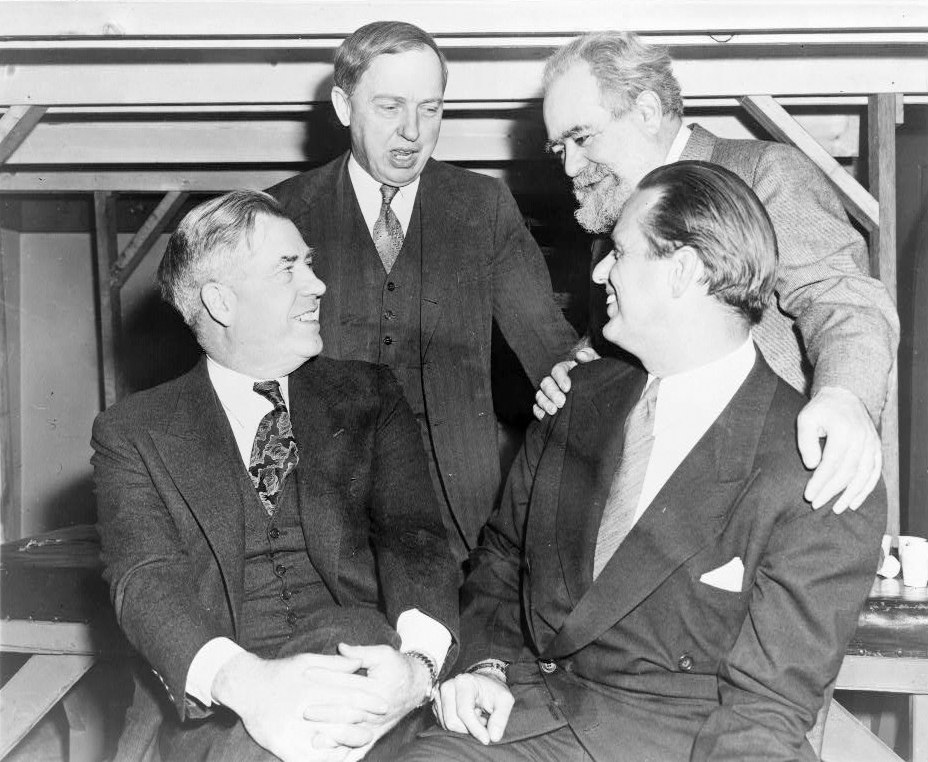
Progressive Citizens of America members, 1947: from left, seated, Henry A. Wallace, Elliott Roosevelt; standing, Dr. Harlow Shapley, Jo Davidson.

Following Baldwin's lead, the PCA fielded a third-party presidential candidate Henry A. Wallace under the Progressive Party banner.

In January 1948, Wallace had Baldwin leave the PCA to become his campaign manager. (Baldwin credited their campaign as having moved Truman politically to the left.) By August 1948, the Washington Post had dubbed Baldwin along with John Abt and Lee Pressman (the latter two members of the Soviet underground Ware Group involved in the Hiss-Chambers Case) as "influential insiders" and "stage managers" in the Wallace campaign.

Baldwin remained the Progressive Party's national secretary until it closed in 1955.

== Personal and death ==
Baldwin lived his later years in Kent, Connecticut. In 1970, son Calvin Benham Baldwin Jr., joined the National Cancer Institute, where he worked for 33 years.

He died of cancer on May 12, 1975, in Bethesda, Maryland.

== Reminisces ==
In her memoir, Virginia Foster Durr recalled:

Beanie Baldwin became head of Wallace's Progressive Citizens of America, and he was one of the reasons I joined Wallace's campaign. I had known Beanie during our years in Washington, and he and I shared many New Deal dreams. He was Calvin Benham Baldwin, but everyone called him Beanie. He had been one of Henry Wallace's assistants when Henry was secretary of agriculture in the 1930s. There seemed to be no other choice for me. There was no Republican party to speak of in Virginia. There may have been ten or twelve Republicans, but I never met any. And the Democratic party of Virginia was absolutely controlled by Harry Byrd. It was a machine that was impossible to break.

W.E.B. Du Bois pledged his support to the 1948 Wallace campaign in a latter to Baldwin that reads:

New York City, July 15, 1948
Dear Mr. Baldwin,
As I have written you before, I am unable to take any active part in partisan politics during this campaign. This is because of the vote of the Board of Directors of the National Association for the Advancement of Colored People, passed in 1944. This vote forbids salaried officers of the Association from taking part in political campaigns. Had I known of this action before rejoining the Association in 1944, I would have insisted on a clearer understanding. I agree with the aim of the Association to be non-partisan, but I am certain that this action does not accomplish this, and in fact intense partisan activity on the part of closely connected with the Association is putting us very distinctly in politics.
Nevertheless, my duty is clear to me. I will obey the letter of the Board's vote, and for that reason, will not attend the Philadelphia meeting or act on any of its committees.
On the other hand, I will retain my right to vote, of which no organization can legally deprive me, and whenever I consider it necessary I will publicly announce my choice of Henry Wallace for president and the reasons therefore. In any such announcement, I will be careful to say that this is my personal opinion and in no way expresses or seeks to express the policy of the NAACP or any of its members.
Very sincerely yours,
W.E.B. Du Bois

Son Calvin Benham Baldwin Jr., recalled:

My father... was a New Dealer, and headed up Farm Security Administration during the New Deal. When he left government, he helped organize the CIO Political Action Committee. Then he helped organize the Progressive Party, and was Henry Wallace's campaign manager when he ran for President in 1948. So I grew up in a very political family. That was, I'd say, a disastrous campaign. Although the Progressives claim that they pushed Harry Truman to the left, and that's what led to that surprising victory in 1948, when he beat Dewey.

== Legacy ==
In his obituary, the New York Times wrote:

Mr. Baldwin served from 1940 to 1943, as Administrator of the Farm Security Administration, regarded by many historians as one of the most successful, if controversial, New Deal agencies. He was accused of radicalism and of trying to "communize American agriculture." Against this opposition, Roosevelt warmly endorsed "the high standard of public service" that characterized Mr. Baldwin's career.

The University of Iowa's biography states: "A supporter of the New Deal's most radical programs, C.B. Baldwin favored national health insurance, guaranteed jobs for the poor, and expanded federal housing."

== See also ==
- Rexford Tugwell
- Henry A. Wallace
- John Abt
- Lee Pressman
- Farm Security Administration
- Progressive Party
- New Deal
- Agricultural Adjustment Administration
- Resettlement Administration
- Congress of Industrial Organizations
- Progressive Citizens of America
- Ware Group

== External sources ==
- "Guide to the C.B. Baldwin Papers". University of Iowa.
- "C.B. Baldwin Dies; New Deal Official Shifted to Wallace". New York Times. 13 May 1975.
- Social Networks and Archival Context (SNAC): Baldwin, Calvin Benham, 1902–1975
