= Fahrenheit (crater) =

Crater on the Moon

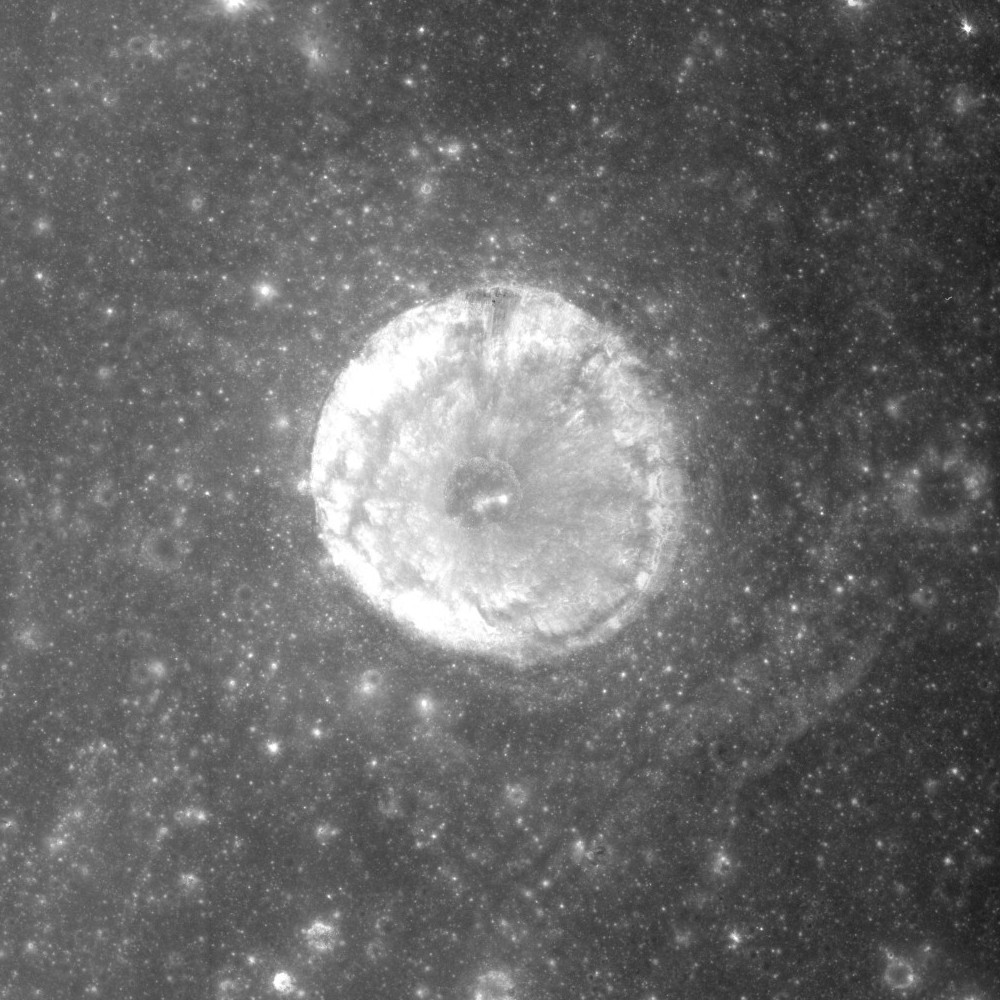
- Apollo 17 Panoramic camera image
- Coordinates: 13.12°N 61.71°E
- Diameter: 6.65 km (4.13 mi)
- Depth: 1.3 km (0.81 mi)
- Colongitude: 299° at sunrise
- Formation: Eratosthenian
- Eponym: Daniel G. Fahrenheit

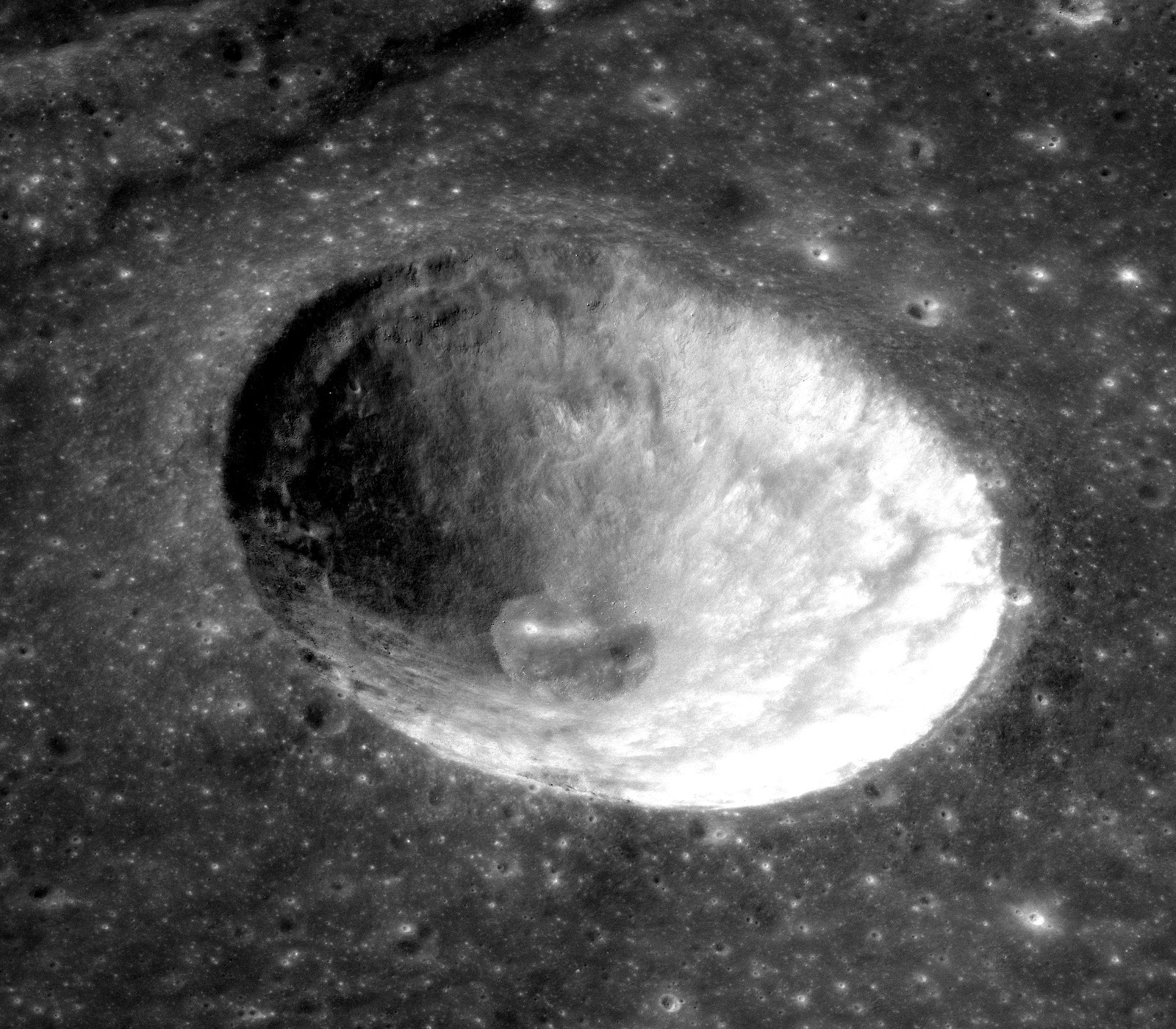
Apollo 17 image

Fahrenheit is a tiny, bowl-shaped lunar impact crater located in the southeast part of the Mare Crisium. It dates to the Eratosthenian period of the lunar geologic timescale, but shows little appears of degredation from subsequent impacts. This area of the surface is nearly devoid of impact features of interest. To the east are the wrinkle ridges named Dorsa Harker, and beyond them is Promontorium Agarum at the edge of the mare. The landing site of the Soviet Luna 24 probe is located about 18.4 kilometers to the southeast.

The crater is named after German-Dutch physicist Daniel Gabriel Fahrenheit (1686-1736). Its designation was officially adopted by the International Astronomical Union in 1976. Previously, it was designated Picard X. The crater Picard is located to the east-northeast on the Mare Crisium.
