= Gimbel =

Gimbel may refer to:

== People ==
- Adam Gimbel (1817–1896), American businessman and founder of the Gimbels department store
- Bernard Gimbel (1885–1966), American businessman who served as president of the Gimbels department store
- Bruce Alva Gimbel (1913–1980), American businessman who served as president of the Gimbels department store
- Elinor S. Gimbel (1896–1983), American progressive leader and women's rights activist
- Howard Gimbel (born 1934), Canadian ophthalmologist
- Norman Gimbel (1927–2018), American lyricist
- Peter Gimbel (1927–1987), American filmmaker and underwater photojournalist
- Richard Gimbel (1898–1970), American businessman, war veteran, and curator
- Roger Gimbel (1925–2011), American television producer
- Sophie Gimbel (1898–1981), American fashion designer
- Thom Gimbel (born 1959), American musician

== Other ==
- Gimbels, American department store

== See also ==
- Gimbal, a pivoted support that allows the rotation of an object about a single axis
- Johnny Gimble (1926–2015), American country musician and fiddler
