= Willis Shapley =

American civil servant

Willis Harlow Shapley
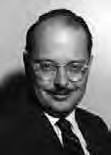
- Willis H. Shapley, NASA photo
- Born: March 2, 1917; Pasadena, California
- Died: October 24, 2005 (aged 88); Washington, D.C.
- Burial place: Oak Hill Cemetery, Washington, D.C. 38.913°N 77.057°W
- Education: Harvard University; University of Chicago (B.A.)
- Parents: Harlow Shapley (father); Martha Betz Shapley (mother)
- Relatives: Mildred Shapley Matthews (sister); Lloyd Shapley (brother)
- Awards: NASA Distinguished Service Medal (1969); NASA Distinguished Service Medal (1988)

Willis Harlow Shapley (March 2, 1917 – October 24, 2005) was an American civil servant best known as the third-ranking administrator for NASA during the Apollo program.

== Biography ==
Shapley was born March 2, 1917, in Pasadena, California. His parents were astronomers Harlow Shapley and Martha Betz Shapley. He attended Harvard University before transferring to University of Chicago, from which he graduated with a B.A. degree in 1938 and where he continued to perform research and other graduate work until 1942.

In 1942, Shapley began federal government service with the Bureau of the Budget (now the Office of Management and Budget) where he worked as an examiner. In that role, he reviewed federal funding, including that for the Manhattan Project, which developed the first nuclear weapons. He ultimately rose to the position of Deputy Chief of the Bureau's Military Division.

=== NASA ===
Shapley's first involvement in the space program was in helping to craft the March 1958 memo that led to the creation of NASA. Later, after the Soviet Union successfully launched the first man into space, he was part of the committee that drafted a memo advocating for NASA's crewed space program, which served as the starting point for President John F. Kennedy's Special Message to the Congress on Urgent National Needs on May 25, 1961, calling for the U.S. to land a man on the Moon and return him safely to Earth.

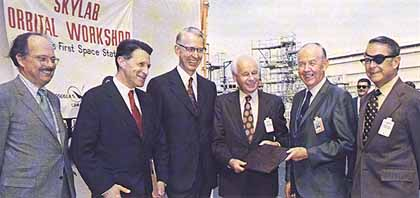
Shapley (far left) at the Skylab rollout ceremony, with Caspar Weinberger, James C. Fletcher, Eberhard Rees, Walter Burke, and Dale D. Myers; Huntington Beach, California, September 1972.

In 1965, Shapley joined NASA as associate deputy administrator, replacing George L. Simpson, Jr. His responsibilities included the space agency's budget, public and legislative affairs, Department of Defense and other interagency affairs, and international relations.

In February 1969, NASA Administrator Thomas O. Paine appointed Shapley to head up the newly-formed Committee on Symbolic Activities for the First Lunar Landing, whose job it was to determine the nature of the artifacts to be left on the Moon as part of the Apollo 11 lunar landing, most notably, the Lunar Flag Assembly. In addition, he set policies for the handling of lunar samples and Apollo-related scientific research.

=== Late career ===
Shapley retired from NASA in 1975, after which he consulted for the American Association for the Advancement of Science, the Office of Management and Budget and Office of Science and Technology, among others. In 1987 he came out of retirement at the request of NASA Administrator James C. Fletcher, rejoining NASA to assist in the investigation into the 1986 Space Shuttle Challenger disaster, reviewing the agency's performance leading up to and following the disaster. He continued to serve as associate deputy administrator for policy until 1988, when he retired again.

After his second retirement, Shapley continued to work for NASA in a consulting capacity, and served on the Carnegie Commission on Science, Technology and Government and in the Office of Science and Technology Policy under President George H. W. Bush.

Shapley was a two-time recipient of the NASA Distinguished Service Medal; first in 1969 and again in 1988.

Shapley died October 24, 2005, at Sibley Memorial Hospital in Washington, D.C., from cellulitis, a bacterial infection. He is buried at Oak Hill Cemetery in Washington.
