= Harlow Shapley =

American scientist and political activist (1885–1972)

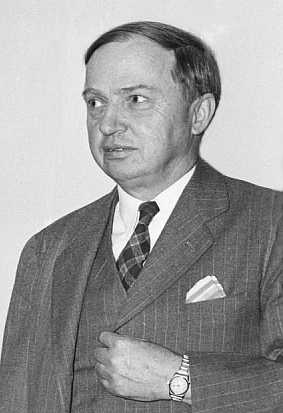
- Shapley in 1947
- Born: November 2, 1885; Nashville, Missouri, U.S.
- Died: October 20, 1972 (aged 86); Boulder, Colorado, U.S.
- Education: University of Missouri, Princeton University
- Known for: Determining correct position of Sun within Milky Way Galaxy; head of Harvard College Observatory (1921–1952)
- Spouse: Martha Betz Shapley
- Children: 5, including: Mildred Shapley Matthews (b. 1915); Willis Shapley (b. 1917); Lloyd Shapley (b. 1923)
- Awards: Henry Draper Medal (1926); Gold Medal of the Royal Astronomical Society (1934); Rittenhouse Medal (1935); Bruce Medal (1939)
- Scientific career
- Fields: Astronomy
- Doctoral advisor: Henry Norris Russell
- Doctoral students: Cecilia Payne-Gaposchkin, Carl Seyfert
- Other notable students: Georges Lemaître, Peter Millman

Harlow Shapley (November 2, 1885 – October 20, 1972) was an American astronomer, who served as head of the Harvard College Observatory from 1921–1952, and political activist during the New Deal and Fair Deal.

Shapley used Cepheid variable stars to estimate the size of the Milky Way Galaxy and the Sun's position within it. In 1953 he proposed his "liquid water belt" theory, a concept now known as a habitable zone.

== Background ==
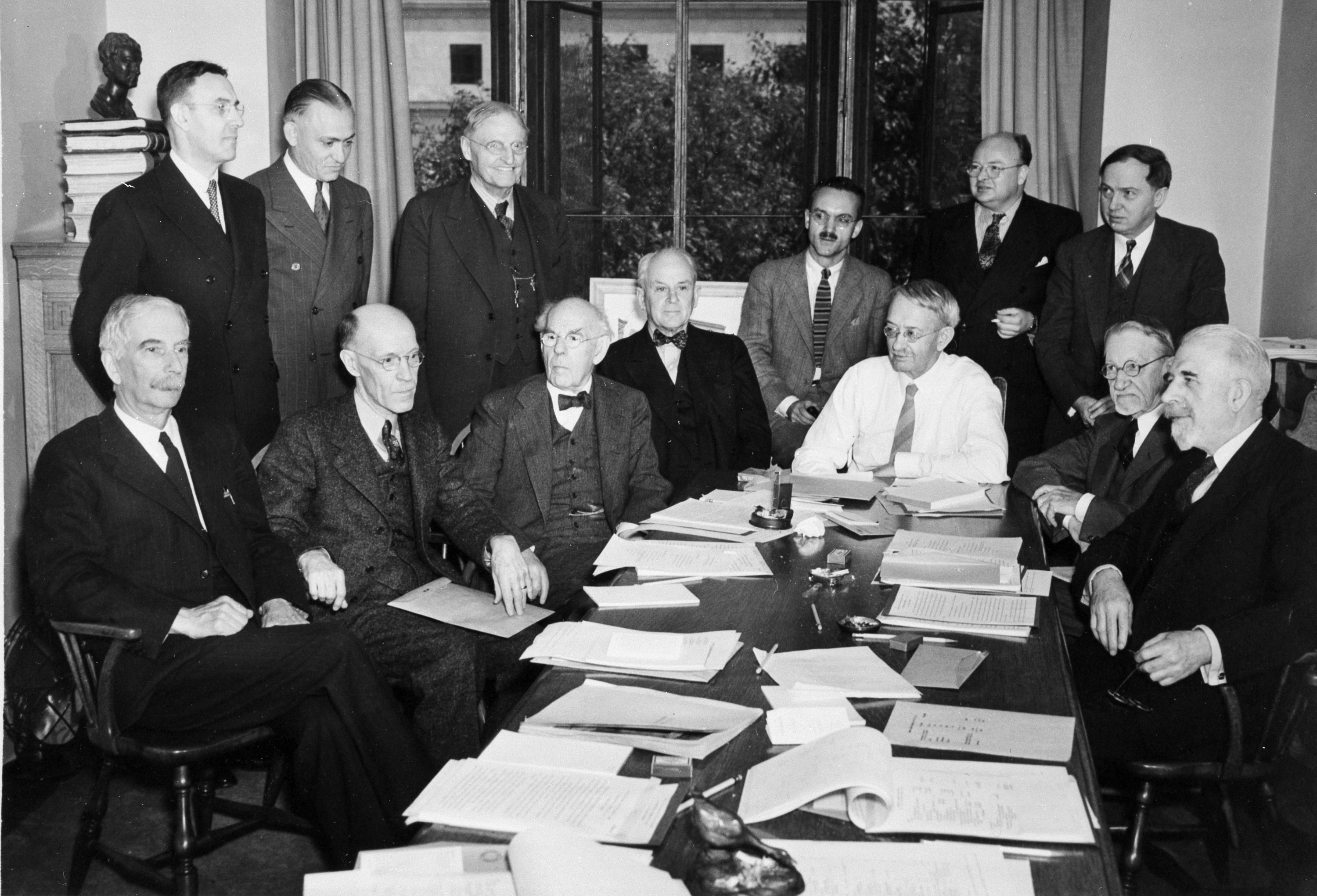
Shapley (first standing from the right) at a Science Service board meeting in 1941

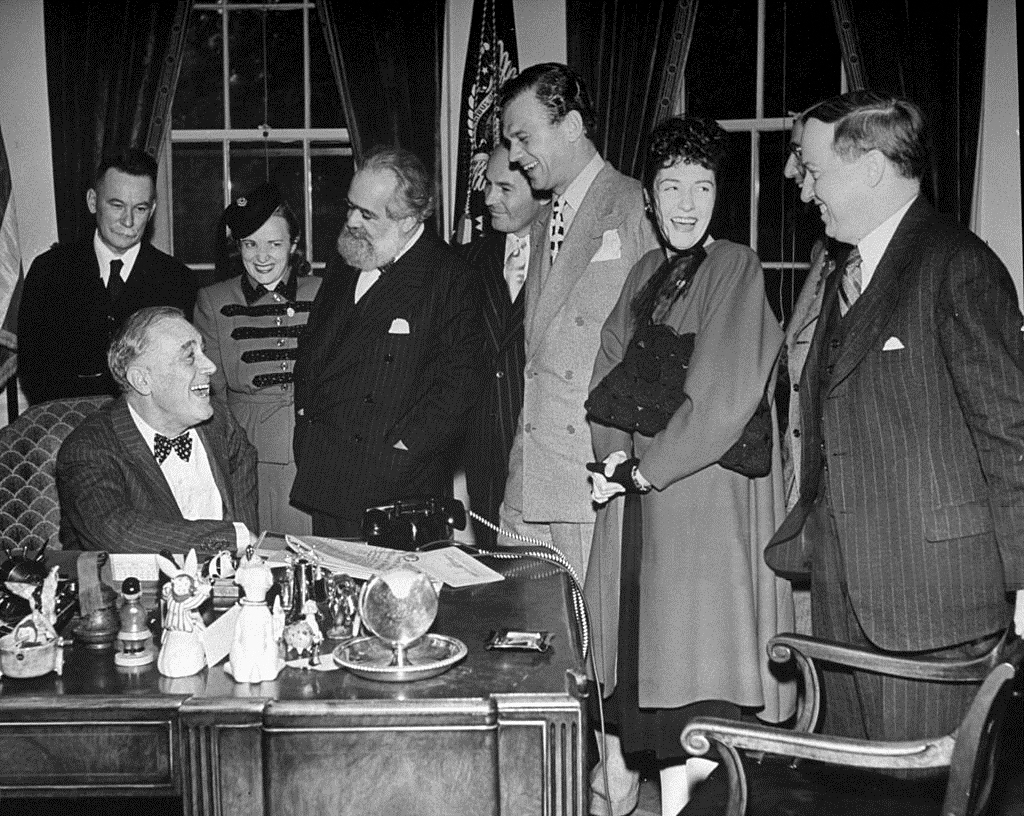
Members of the Independent Voters Committee of the Arts and Sciences for Roosevelt visit FDR at the White House (October 1944). From left: Van Wyck Brooks, Hannah Dorner, Jo Davidson, Jan Kiepura, Joseph Cotten, Dorothy Gish, Dr. Harlow Shapley

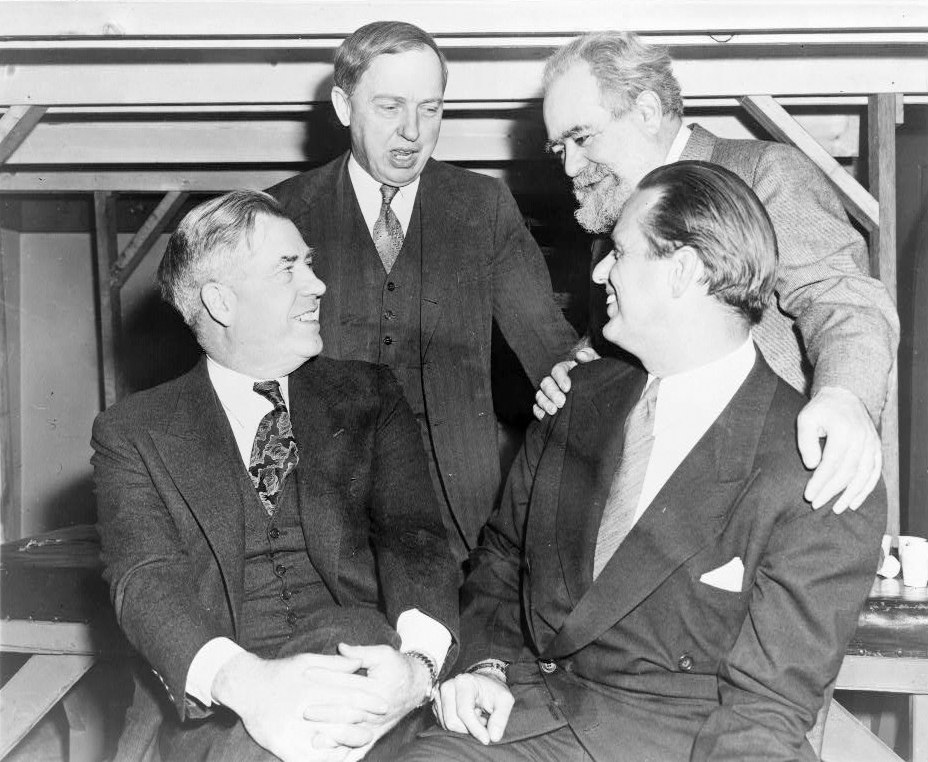
Progressive Citizens of America members, 1947. From left, seated, Henry A. Wallace, Elliott Roosevelt; standing, Dr. Harlow Shapley, Jo Davidson

Shapley was born on a farm five miles outside Nashville, Missouri, to Willis and Sarah (née Stowell) Shapley. He went to school in Jasper, Missouri, but not beyond elementary school. He worked as a journalist after studying at home and covering crime stories as a newspaper reporter for the Daily Sun in Chanute, Kansas, and intermittently for the Times of Joplin, Missouri. In Chanute, he found a Carnegie library and started reading and studying on his own. Shapley returned to complete a six-year high school program in 1.5 years, graduating as class valedictorian.

In 1907, Shapley went to the University of Missouri to study journalism. When he learned that the opening of the School of Journalism had been postponed for a year, he decided to study the first subject he came across in the course directory. Rejecting Archaeology, which Shapley later claimed he could not pronounce, he chose the next subject, Astronomy.

=== Early years ===
After graduation, Shapley received a fellowship to Princeton University for graduate work, where he studied under Henry Norris Russell and used the period–luminosity relation for Cepheid variable stars (discovered by Henrietta Swan Leavitt) to determine distances to globular clusters. He was instrumental in moving astronomy away from the idea that Cepheids were spectroscopic binaries, and toward the concept that they were pulsators.

He realized that the Milky Way Galaxy was far larger than previously believed, and that the Sun's place in the galaxy was in a nondescript location. This discovery supports the Copernican principle, according to which the Earth is not at the center of the Solar System, the Milky Way galaxy, or the Universe.

=== The Great Debate of 1920 ===
Shapley participated in the "Great Debate" with Heber D. Curtis on the nature of nebulae and galaxies and the size of the Universe. The debate took place on April 26, 1920, in the hall of the United States National Academy of Sciences in Washington DC. Shapley took the side that spiral nebulae (what are now called galaxies) are inside the Milky Way, while Curtis took the side that the spiral nebulae are "island universes" far outside the Milky Way and comparable in size and nature to the Milky Way. This issue and debate are the start of extragalactic astronomy, while the detailed arguments and data, often with ambiguities, appeared together in 1921.

Characteristic issues were whether Adriaan van Maanen had measured rotation in a spiral nebula, the nature and luminosity of the exploding novae and supernovae seen in spiral galaxies, and the size of the Milky Way. However, Shapley's actual talk and argument given during the Great Debate were completely different from the published paper. Historian Michael Hoskin says "His decision was to treat the National Academy of Sciences to an address so elementary that much of it was necessarily uncontroversial", with Shapley's motivation being only to impress a delegation from Harvard who were interviewing him for a possible offer as the next Director of Harvard College Observatory. With the default by Shapley, Curtis won the debate. The astronomical issues were soon resolved in favor of Curtis' position when Edwin Hubble discovered Cepheid variable stars in the Andromeda Galaxy.

At the time of the debate, Shapley was working at the Mount Wilson Observatory, where he had been hired by George Ellery Hale. After the debate, however, he was hired to replace the recently deceased Edward Charles Pickering as director of the Harvard College Observatory (HCO).

=== Conversion to Hubble's ideas ===
He is also known to have opposed Edwin Hubble's observations that there are additional galaxies in the universe other than the Milky Way. Shapley fiercely critiqued Hubble and regarded his work as junk science. However, after he received a letter from Hubble showing Hubble's observed light curve of V1, a Cepheid variable star in the Andromeda galaxy, he withdrew his criticism. He reportedly told a colleague, "Here is the letter that destroyed my universe." He also encouraged Hubble to write a paper for a joint meeting of the American Astronomical Society and American Association for the Advancement of Science. Hubble's findings went on to fundamentally reshape the scientific view of the universe.

Despite having earlier argued strongly against the idea of galaxies other than the Milky Way, Shapley went on to make significant progress in the research of the distribution of galaxies, working between 1925 and 1932. In this time period, with the Harvard College Observatory, he worked to map 76,000 galaxies. One of the first astronomers to believe in the existence of galaxy superclusters, Shapley later discovered a large and distant example, which was later named the Shapley Supercluster. He estimated the distance to this supercluster at 231 Mpc, which is within 15% of the currently accepted value.

=== Harvard College Observatory ===
He served as director of the HCO from 1921 to 1952. During this time, he hired Cecilia Payne, who, in 1925, became the first person to earn a doctorate at Radcliffe College in the field of astronomy, for work done at Harvard College Observatory.

From 1941 he was on the original standing committee of the Foundation for the Study of Cycles. He also served on the board of trustees of Science Service, now known as Society for Science & the Public, from 1935 to 1971.

=== Activism ===
In the 1940s, Shapley helped found government funded scientific associations, including the National Science Foundation. He shares credit with British biochemist Joseph Needham for the addition of the "S" in UNESCO (United Nations Educational, Scientific and Cultural Organization).

On November 14, 1946, Shapley appeared under subpoena by the House Committee on Un-American Activities (HCUA) in his role as member of the Independent Citizens Committee of the Arts, Sciences and Professions (ICCASP), which HCUA described as a "major political arm of the Russophile left". It had opposed re-election of U.S. Representative Joseph William Martin Jr. during mid-term elections that year and was asked to answer questions about the ICCASP's Massachusetts' chapter. HCUA committee chairman John E. Rankin commented about Shapley's attitude, "I have never seen a witness treat a committee with more contempt" and considered contempt of Congress charges. Shapley accused HCUA of "Gestapo methods" and advocated for its abolition, saying that it had made "civic cowards of many citizens" by pursuing the "bogey of political radicalism."

A few weeks later, in early 1947, Shapley became president of the American Association for the Advancement of Science (AAAS). At the time, the AAAS's choice appeared to be a "rebuke" of HCUA and a positive championing of scientists. In his inaugural address, Shapley referred to the danger of the "genius maniac" and proposed the elimination of "all primates that show any evidence or signs of genius or even talent" (a suggestion that was apparently tongue-in-cheek). Four other global threats he listed were: drugs that suppressed the desire for sex, boredom, a world war with weapons of mass destruction, and a plague epidemic.

In March 1949, Shapley chaired the Cultural and Scientific Conference for World Peace at the Waldorf-Astoria in New York. It was sponsored by the National Council of Arts, Sciences and Professions. Arch-conservative William F. Buckley, Jr., authored a 1951 book, God and Man at Yale: The Superstitions of "Academic Freedom," wherein, in the eve of McCarthyism, he attacked liberalism at Yale and academia in general. In the book, Buckley cited Shapley's participation and averred that event was "Communist-inspired" and "Russian-dominated."

In 1950, Shapley was instrumental in organizing a campaign in academia against Worlds in Collision by Russian expatriate psychiatrist Immanuel Velikovsky. Scientists generally considered this controversial US bestseller to be pseudoscience.

== Global policy ==
He was one of the signatories of the agreement to convene a convention for drafting a world constitution. As a result, for the first time in human history, a World Constituent Assembly convened to draft and adopt the Constitution for the Federation of Earth.

== Personal life ==
Shapley married Martha Betz (1890–1981) in April 1914, whom he had met in Missouri. She assisted her husband in astronomical research both at Mount Wilson and at Harvard Observatory. She wrote numerous articles on eclipsing stars and other astronomical objects.

They had one daughter, editor and writer Mildred Shapley Matthews; and four sons. These included Lloyd Shapley, a mathematician and economist who won a Nobel Memorial Prize in Economics in 2012, and Willis Shapley, who became a Senior Executive Service leader at NASA. His eldest granddaughter, June Lorraine Matthews, became a physicist.

Although Shapley was an agnostic, he was greatly interested in religion.

Shapley died in a nursing home in Boulder, Colorado on October 20, 1972, shortly before his 87th birthday.

== Awards and honors ==
- Elected Member of the American Academy of Arts and Sciences (1920)
- Elected Member of the American Philosophical Society (1922)
- Elected Member of the United States National Academy of Sciences (1924)
- Henry Draper Medal of the National Academy of Sciences (1926)
- Prix Jules Janssen of the Société astronomique de France (French Astronomical Society) (1933)
- Rumford Prize of the American Academy of Arts and Sciences (1933)
- Gold Medal of the Royal Astronomical Society (1934)
- Bruce Medal of the Astronomical Society of the Pacific (1939)
- Janssen Medal from the French Academy of Sciences (1940)
- Pius XI Medal (1941)
- Franklin Medal (1945)
- Henry Norris Russell Lectureship of the American Astronomical Society (1950)

== Legacy ==
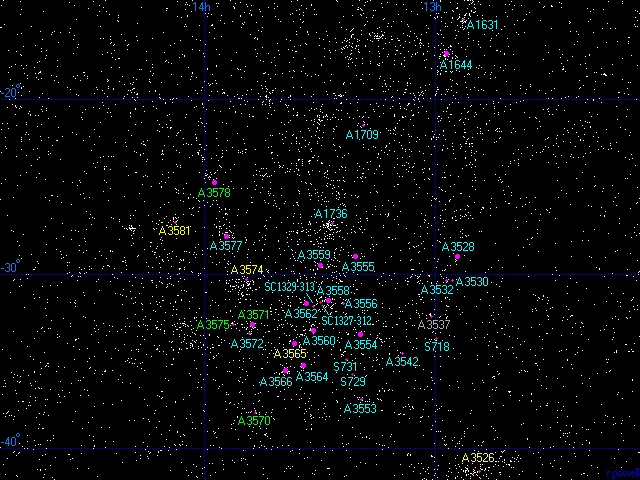
Shapley Supercluster map

Named after him are:

- The crater Shapley on the Moon
- Asteroid 1123 Shapleya
- Shapley Supercluster
- Harlow Shapley Visiting Lectureships In Astronomy, American Astronomical Society

Before the anti-communist phrase "Better Dead Than Red" became popular during McCarthyism in the 1950s, Shapley said in a 1947 speech entitled "Peace or Pieces" that "A slave world is not worth preserving. Better be lifeless like the cold moon, or primitively vegetal like desolate Mars, than be a planet populated by social robots."

== Works ==
Shapley wrote many books on astronomy and the sciences. Among these was Source Book in Astronomy (New York: McGraw–Hill, 1929, co-written with Helen E. Howarth, also on the staff of the Harvard College Observatory), the first of the publisher's series of source books in the history of the sciences.

In 1953, he wrote the "Liquid Water Belt" which gave scientific credence to the ecosphere theory of Hubertus Strughold.

In his 1957 book Of Stars and Men, Shapley proposed the term Metagalaxies for what are now called superclusters.

Shapley attended Institute on Religion in an Age of Science conferences at Star Island and was the editor of the book Science Ponders Religion (1960).

=== Books ===
- Shapley, Harlow (1972). Galaxies. The Harvard books on astronomy. Harvard University Press. ISBN 978-0674340510.
- Shapley, Harlow (1969). Through Rugged Ways to the Stars. Scribner.
- Shapley, Harlow (1967). Beyond the Observatory. Scribner.
- Shapley, Harlow (1964). The View from a Distant Star: Man's Future in the Universe. Dell Publishing, Co.
- Shapley, Harlow, ed. (1960). Source book in astronomy, 1900–1950. Source books in the history of the sciences. Harvard University Press.
- Shapley, Harlow (1958). Of Stars and Men: The Human Response to an Expanding Universe. Beacon Press.
- Shapley, Harlow (1958). A Census of Northern Galaxies in an Area of 3600 Square Degrees. Harvard College Observatory. Annals, v. 88, no. 7. Beacon Press.
- Shapley, Harlow, ed. (1953). Climatic Change: Evidence, Causes, and Effects. Cambridge: Harvard University Press.
- Shapley, Harlow (1948). Galactic and Extragalactic Studies, XVIII. Volume 36. National Academy of Sciences.
- Shapley, Harlow (1936). Time and Its Mysteries. Series 1:Lectures given on the James Arthur Foundation, New York University. New York University Press.
- Shapley, Harlow (1934). The Angular Diameters of Bright Galaxies. The Observatory.
- Shapley, Harlow (1930). Star Clusters. New York: McGraw-Hill.
- Shapley, Harlow (1930). Flights from Chaos: A Survey of Material Systems from Atoms to Galaxies, Adapted from Lectures at the College of the City of New York, Class of 1872 Foundation. Whittlesey House, McGraw–Hill Book Company, Inc. Bibcode:1930fcsm.book.....S.
- Shapley, Harlow (1926). Starlight. George H. Doran Co.
- Shapley, Harlow (1924). Descriptions and Positions of 2,829 New Nebulae ... Harvard College Observatory. Annals, v. 85, no. 6. The Observatory.

=== Papers ===
- Shapley, Harlow (October 21, 1919). "Star Clusters and their Contribution to Knowledge of the Universe". Proceedings of the American Philosophical Society. 63 (5): 337–345.
- Shapley, Harlow (August 1920). "Note on Pterergates in the Californian Harvester Ant". Psyche: A Journal of Entomology. 27 (4): 72–74. doi:10.1155/1920/73165.

== See also ==
- Habitable zone
- Milky Way Galaxy
- National Science Foundation
- RR Lyrae
- UNESCO
