= National Council of Arts, Sciences and Professions =

The National Council of (the) Arts, Sciences and Professions (NCASP or ASP) was a United States–based socialist organization of the 1950s. Entertainment trade publication Box Office characterized the ASP as "an independent organization to support [presidential candidate Henry] Wallace."

The ASP sponsored the Cultural and Scientific Conference for World Peace, held at the Waldorf Astoria hotel in New York City over three days in late March 1949. It was a controversial conference, picketed by Catholic War Veterans. W. E. B. Du Bois gave an impassioned speech on the final night. The ASP asked Du Bois to represent them at the World Congress of the Partisans of Peace in Paris in April 1949. Du Bois also attended, on behalf of the ASP, the All-Soviet Peace Conference in August 1949.

== Campaign against the Hollywood blacklist ==
The ASP actively campaigned against the Hollywood blacklist, filing an amicus brief to the Supreme Court against conviction of the 'Hollywood Ten' in the fall of 1948. The ASP placed an advertisement in the December 1, 1948 issue of Variety, signed by Arthur Miller, Norman Mailer, Lillian Hellman, Clifford Odets, and others, calling for the revocation of the Hollywood blacklist; theater professionals Alfred Drake and Garson Kanin were listed as co-chairmen of the ASP's Theatre Division. The ASP staged a series of public New York City rallies against the Hollywood blacklist in the fall of 1951.

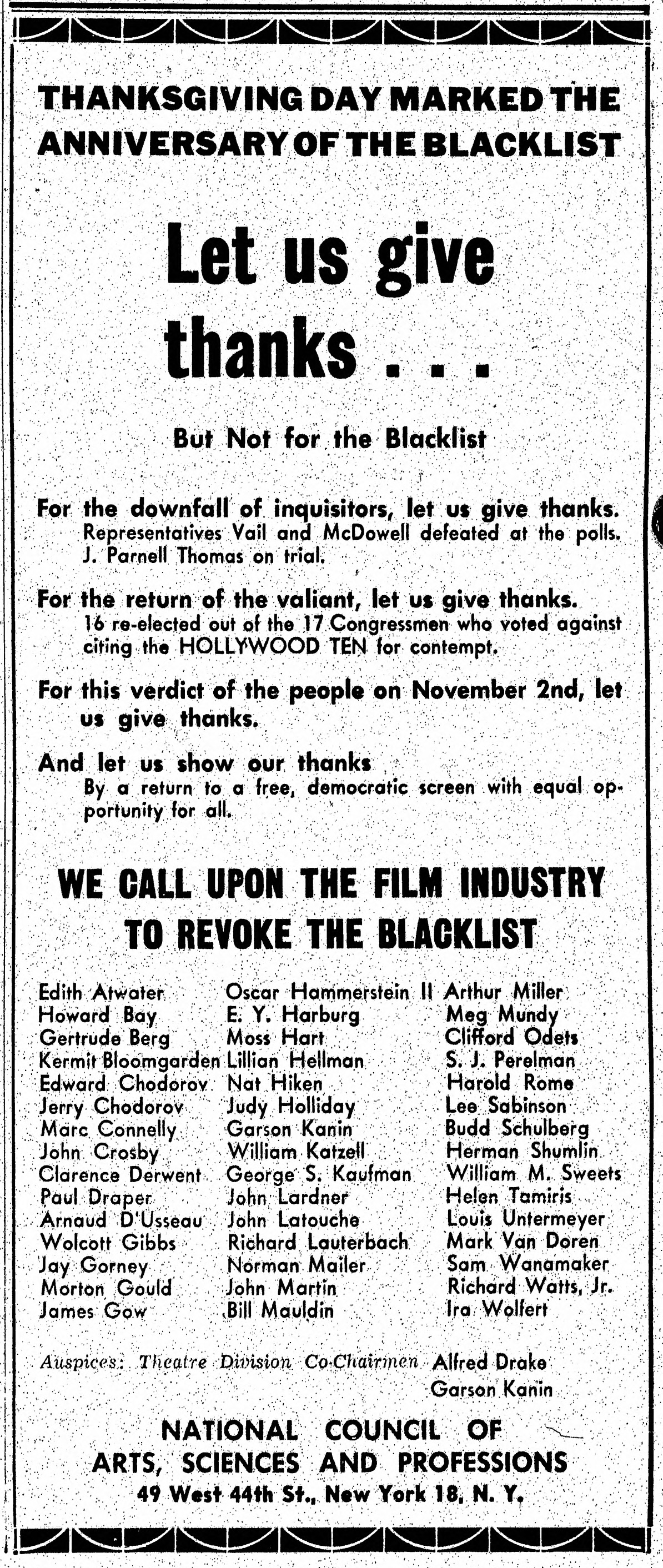
Advertisement from a 1948 Thanksgiving issue of Variety

== Film Division ==
The ASP operated a 'Film Division' headquartered at the Hotel Iroquois in New York City in the late 1940s. An ASP publication from 1948 says "the full program of [the] Film Division is devoted to stimulating the production, distribution and utilization of progressive motion pictures in the theatre, in the documentary and educational fields, and in election campaigns." The Film Division also published Films for '48: A Guide to Progressive Films and their Use—a 1948 catalog of progressive political films, presenting what it considered to be the "WHAT, WHERE, and HOW of films for '48, the most crucial political (and economic and social) year in the history of our country."

== See also ==
- Independent Citizens Committee of the Arts, Sciences and Professions
- Progressive Citizens of America
