= Tebbutt (crater) =

Crater on the Moon

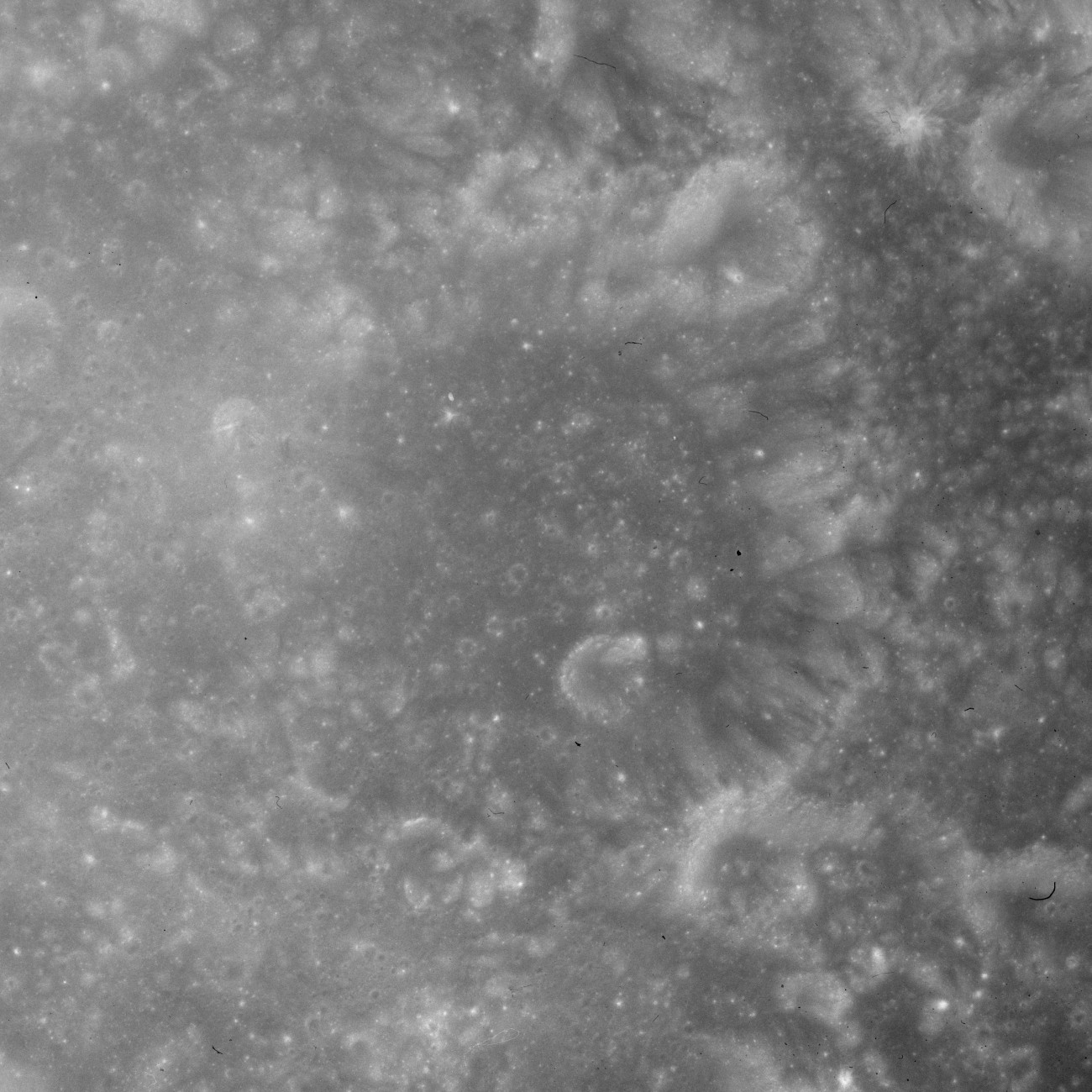
- Apollo 15 Mapping camera image
- Coordinates: 9.6°N 53.6°E
- Diameter: 31 km
- Colongitude: 307° at sunrise
- Eponym: John Tebbutt

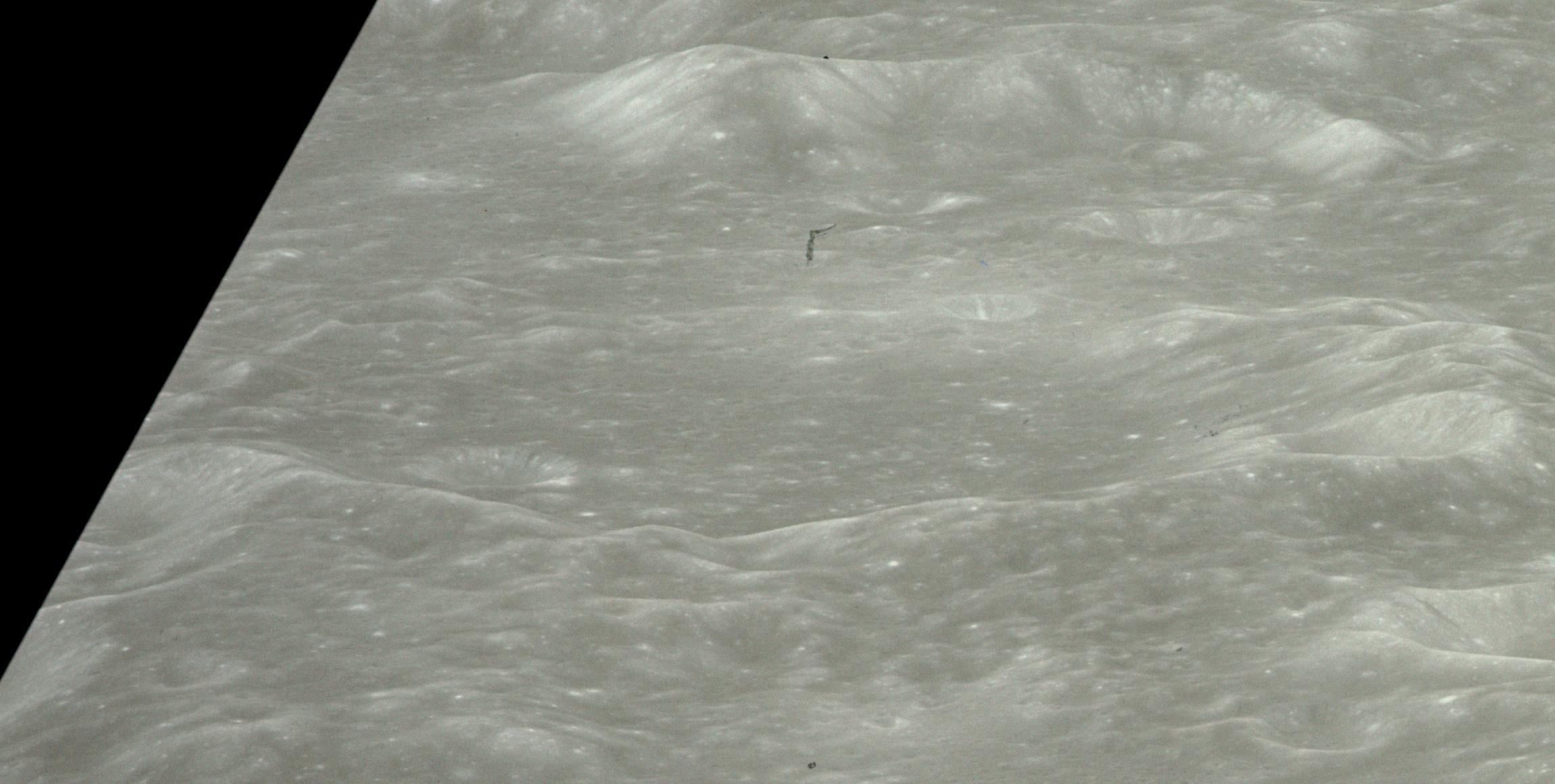
Oblique view from Apollo 17

Tebbutt is a lunar impact crater that is located near the southwestern edge of Mare Crisium. It was named after Australian astronomer John Tebbutt. It was formerly designated Picard G before being named by the IAU, and lies south of the crater Picard. To the north of Tebbutt, but farther east than Picard, is the flooded Lick.

This crater has a worn and damaged outer rim along its eastern half, but the rim is all but nonexistent on the western face, being little more than a pair of curved ridges beneath the surface. Lava flows have overflowed this western rim and submerged the interior, leaving a relatively level and featureless interior. A small craterlet marks the southern end of the interior floor, and several tiny craters mark the surviving rim.
