= Martha Betz Shapley =

American astronomer

- Born: Martha Betz; August 3, 1890; Kansas City, Missouri, U.S.
- Died: January 24, 1981 (aged 90); Tucson, Arizona, U.S.
- Education: University of Missouri; Bryn Mawr College
- Spouse: Harlow Shapley (m. 1914; died 1972)
- Children: 5, including: Mildred Shapley Matthews; Willis Shapley; Lloyd Shapley
- Scientific career
- Fields: Astronomy

Martha Betz Shapley (August 3, 1890 – January 24, 1981) was an American astronomer known for her research on eclipsing binary stars.

== Early life ==
Shapley was born on August 3, 1890, in Kansas City, Missouri, one of seven children of school music teacher Carl Betz (1854–1898) and his wife. Her family were descendants of German immigrants, and her grandfather once told her that he had seen astronomer Caroline Herschel in the streets of Hanover in Germany. Her mother and two sisters became schoolteachers, and Shapley herself became a schoolteacher at age 15. Three years later, she began her studies at the University of Missouri, where she earned a bachelor's degree in education, a second bachelor's degree, and a master's degree, in 1910, 1911, and 1913, respectively. She became a member of Phi Beta Kappa.

She became a high school mathematics teacher in 1912, and soon afterwards began working towards a doctorate in German literature at Bryn Mawr College in Pennsylvania. In 1914, she left the program to marry Harlow Shapley, an astronomer who had been a fellow student with her in Missouri.

== Astronomical research ==
Shapley moved with her husband to the Mount Wilson Observatory and Harvard College Observatory, and from 1915 through 1927 she continued to publish research on eclipsing binary stars, despite not having any formal academic appointment. This was a topic which her husband had previously studied as a graduate student but had moved on from; Zdeněk Kopal has speculated that (as she was the more talented in mathematics of the two Shapleys) she provided significant anonymous assistance to her husband in his doctoral work. Eventually, the pressure of family life caused her to set aside her work in this area.

== Harvard College Observatory ==
Shapley worked at the Harvard College Observatory from 1921 to 1932. She gained recognition for her expertise in eclipsing binary stars and additionally conducted mathematical computations for a range of diverse projects. Specializing in the computation of eclipsing binary star orbits, she focused on pairs of stars orbiting closely together, appearing as a single variable point of light from Earth. Between 1917 and 1932, she meticulously calculated and published the orbital paths of at least 14 such binary stars.

== War service and security investigation ==
During World War II, in order to contribute to the war effort, Shapley applied to work for the civil service doing cryptanalysis, a subject she had previously studied, but was unable to find a position doing this in Boston. Instead, she began working with Zdeněk Kopal calculating tables of munitions trajectories. Throughout World War II, Shapley utilized her mathematical prowess to support the war endeavors. For a duration of four years, she dedicated her efforts to calculating firing tables for the Navy and Air Force within the Division of Industrial Cooperation at MIT.

After the war, when senator Joseph McCarthy and the House Un-American Activities Committee began investigating her husband for his left-leaning political views, she came under fire as well, and in 1950 after she was discovered to have brought home data from Kopal on eclipsing binary stars she was relieved of her military work and of her security clearance. However, her clearance was restored and she was allowed to resume her work several months later.

== Later life ==
Shapley's husband retired in 1952, and the couple moved to New Hampshire, but Shapley continued her work on eclipsing binaries. In 1956, with Kopal, she published her last major work, Catalogue of the Elements of Eclipsing Binaries. After her husband's death in 1972, she moved again, to Arizona. She died on January 24, 1981.

Her daughter Mildred Shapley Matthews also became a noted astronomer, her son Willis Shapley became an administrator at NASA, and another son Lloyd Shapley became a Nobel-prize-winning mathematician and economist.
