= CIO-PAC =

Political action committee of the Congress of Industrial Organizations

Congress of Industrial Organizations – Political Action Committee (CIO-PAC)
- Formation: July 1943
- Merger of: 1955
- Type: Political action committee
- Chairman: Sidney Hillman (ACW)
- Treasurer: R. J. Thomas (UAW)
- Board of directors: Vann Bittner (UMW), Sherman Dalrymple (URW), Albert Fitzgerald (UE), David McDonald (USWA)
- Key people: John Abt (co-counsel), Lee Pressman (co-counsel), Calvin Benham Baldwin
- Parent organization: Congress of Industrial Organizations

The Congress of Industrial Organizations – Political Action Committee (CIO-PAC) was a political action committee in the United States, active from 1943 to 1955. It was the first political action committee established in the country. It was established by the Congress of Industrial Organizations (CIO), a federation of industrial unions.

What distinguished the CIO-PAC from previous political groups (including the AFL's political operations) was its "open, public operation, soliciting support from non-CIO unionists and from the progressive public. ... Moreover, CIO political operatives would actively participate in intraparty platform, policy, and candidate selection processes, pressing the broad agenda of the industrial union movement."

== Background ==
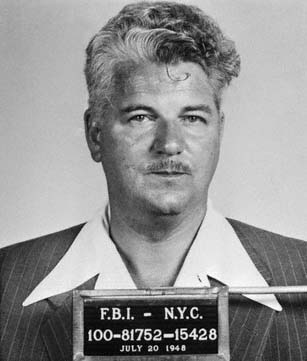
FBI mugshot of Eugene Dennis (1948)

In his 1993 memoir, John Abt, general counsel for the Amalgamated Clothing Workers of America under Sidney Hillman, claimed the leaders of the Communist Party of the USA had inspired the idea of the CIO-PAC:

In 1943, Gene Dennis came to me and Lee Pressman to first raise the idea of a political action committee to organize labor support for Roosevelt in the approaching 1944 election. Pressman approached Murray with the idea, as I did with Hillman. Both men seized upon the proposal with great enthusiasm.

Abt and Pressman become the CIO-PAC's co-counsels.

Momentum for the CIO-PAC came from the Smith–Connally Act or War Labor Disputes Act (50 U.S.C. App. 1501 et seq.) was an American law passed on June 25, 1943, over President Franklin D. Roosevelt's veto. The legislation was hurriedly created after 400,000 coal miners, their wages significantly lowered because of high wartime inflation, struck for a $2-a-day wage increase. The Act allowed the federal government to seize and operate industries threatened by or under strikes that would interfere with war production, and prohibited unions from making contributions in federal elections.

The war powers bestowed by the Act were first used in August 1944 when the Fair Employment Practices Commission ordered the Philadelphia Transportation Company to hire African Americans as motormen. The 10,000 members of the Philadelphia Rapid Transit Employees Union (PRTEU), a labor union unaffiliated with either the American Federation of Labor or the Congress of Industrial Organizations, led a sick-out strike, now known as the Philadelphia transit strike of 1944, for six days. President Roosevelt sent 8,000 United States Army troops to the city to seize and operate the transit system, and threatened to draft any PRTEU member who did not return to the job within 48 hours. Roosevelt's actions broke the strike.

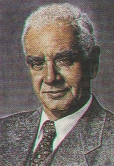
Philip Murray, 2nd CIO president

In November 1946, prior to passage of the Smith–Connally Act, the CIO's second president, Philip Murray appointed John Brophy (a UMW leader, by then head of the CIO's director of Industrial Union Councils), Nathan Cowan (CIO legislative director), and J. Raymond Walsh (CIO research director) to report on CIO political operations. Their report of December 1946 included recommendation for a permanent CIO national political group and consideration for formation of an American Labor Party. During CIO Executive Board meetings in January and February 1943, the board approved most recommendations.

== Formation ==
FDR with Chiang Kai-shek and Winston Churchill at the Cairo Conference (December 1943)

Upon passage of the Smith–Connally Act on June 25, 1943, Murray called for a political action committee. The CIO-PAC formed in July 1943 to support the fourth candidacy of Franklin Delano Roosevelt for U.S. President in 1944 toward the end of World War II. It also provided financial assistance to other CIO-endorsed political candidates and pro-labor legislation (e.g., continuation of the Wagner Act against the Taft–Hartley Act in 1947). CIO member unions funded it. Its first head was Sidney Hillman, founder and head of the Amalgamated Clothing Workers of America, from 1943 to 1946.

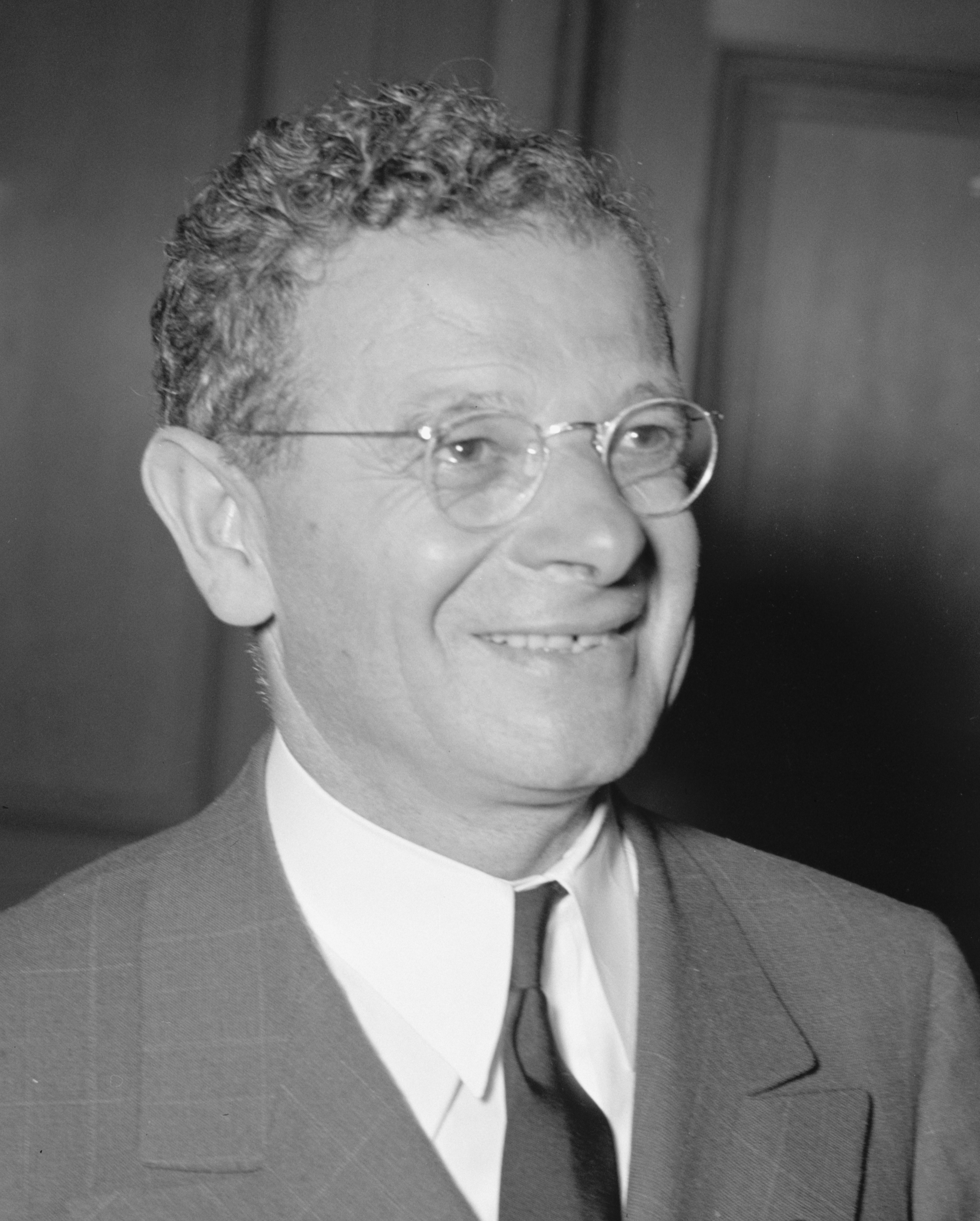
Sidney Hillman, first CIO-PAC chairman and ACW president

First members of the CIO-PAC included the following:

- Sidney Hillman, chairman (founder and head of the Amalgamated Clothing Workers of America or ACW)
- R. J. Thomas, treasurer (president of the United Auto Workers or UAW)
- Vann Bittner, member (national organizer for the United Mine Workers or UMW)
- Sherman Dalrymple, member (president of the United Rubber Workers) or URW)
- Albert Fitzgerald, member (president of the United Electrical, Radio and Machine Workers of America or UE)
- David McDonald, member (secretary-treasurer of the United Steel Workers of America or USWA)

John Abt and Lee Pressman became the CIO-PAC's co-counsels. Calvin Benham Baldwin left government at that time to go work for the CIO-PAC. (By August 1948, the Washington Post had dubbed Baldwin along with John Abt and Lee Pressman (the latter two members of the Soviet underground Ware Group involved in the Hiss-Chambers Case) as "influential insiders" and "stage managers" in the Wallace presidential campaign.)

== 20th century ==
After 1944, Lucy Randolph Mason worked with the CIO-PAC in the South, helping to register union members, black and white, and working for the elimination of the poll tax. She also forged lasting links between labor and religious groups.

On October 17, 1950, New York State Supreme Court Judge Ferdinand Pecora and US Senator Herbert H. Lehman (D-NY) gave radio addresses on behalf of the CIO-PAC during prime (10:30–11:15 pm.).

In 1955, when the CIO rejoined the American Federation of Labor to form the AFL–CIO, Jack Kroll became head of the CIO-PAC, which merged with the AFL's "League for Political Education" to form the AFL–CIO Committee on Political Education.

== 21st century ==
PAC activities by AFL–CIO and its members continue into the 21st century. In 2015, an AFL–CIO's moratorium on federal PAC contributions by its member unions began to fall apart weeks after its announcement. Defiant unions included: United Food and Commercial Workers, the International Association of Machinists, and the Laborers' International Union of North America–13% were non-compliant.

== Works cited ==
- Abt, John; Myerson, Michael (1993). Advocate and Activist: Memoirs of an American Communist Lawyer. University of Illinois Press. ISBN 978-0-252-02030-8.
- Gall, Gilbert J. (February 25, 1999). Pursuing Justice: Lee Pressman, the New Deal, and the CIO. State University of New York Press. ISBN 978-0791441046.
- Malsberger, John W. (2000). From Obstruction to Moderation: The Transformation of Senate Conservatism, 1938–1952. Susquehanna University Press. ISBN 978-1575910260.
- Salmond, John A. (1988). Miss Lucy of the CIO: The Life and Times of Lucy Randolph Mason. Athens, GA: University of Georgia Press. ISBN 978-0-8203-0956-9.
- Zieger, Robert H. (1997). The CIO, 1935–1955. University of North Carolina Press. ISBN 978-0-8078-4630-8.

== External sources ==
- Foster, James Caldwell (1975). The Union Politic: The CIO Political Action Committee. University of Missouri Press. pp. 247.
- Calkins, Fay (1952). The CIO and the Democratic Party. University of Chicago Press.
- Richter, Irving (2003). Labor's Struggles, 1945–1950: A Participant's View.
- "Labor's Communists Come Under Fire". Life. Vol. 22, no. 12. 24 March 1947.
