= Mildred Shapley Matthews =

Book editor and writer known for astronomy books

Mildred Shapley Matthews (February 15, 1915 – February 11, 2016) was a book editor and writer known for astronomy books. She was the daughter of astronomers Harlow Shapley and Martha Betz Shapley; her father named the asteroid 878 Mildred for her.

== Personal life ==
Mildred Shapley, one of five siblings (the others were all boys) born to Harlow Shapley and Martha Betz Shapley, attended the University of Michigan where she met her future husband, Ralph Matthews. The couple married in 1937, and moved to Altadena, California in 1945, where they lived for over 30 years and raised three of their four children.

A widow, she died aged 100 in Pasadena, California, survived by her four children, including June Lorraine Matthews, a brother, and a large extended family.
