= 1948 Progressive National Convention =

United States political event

- 1948 presidential election
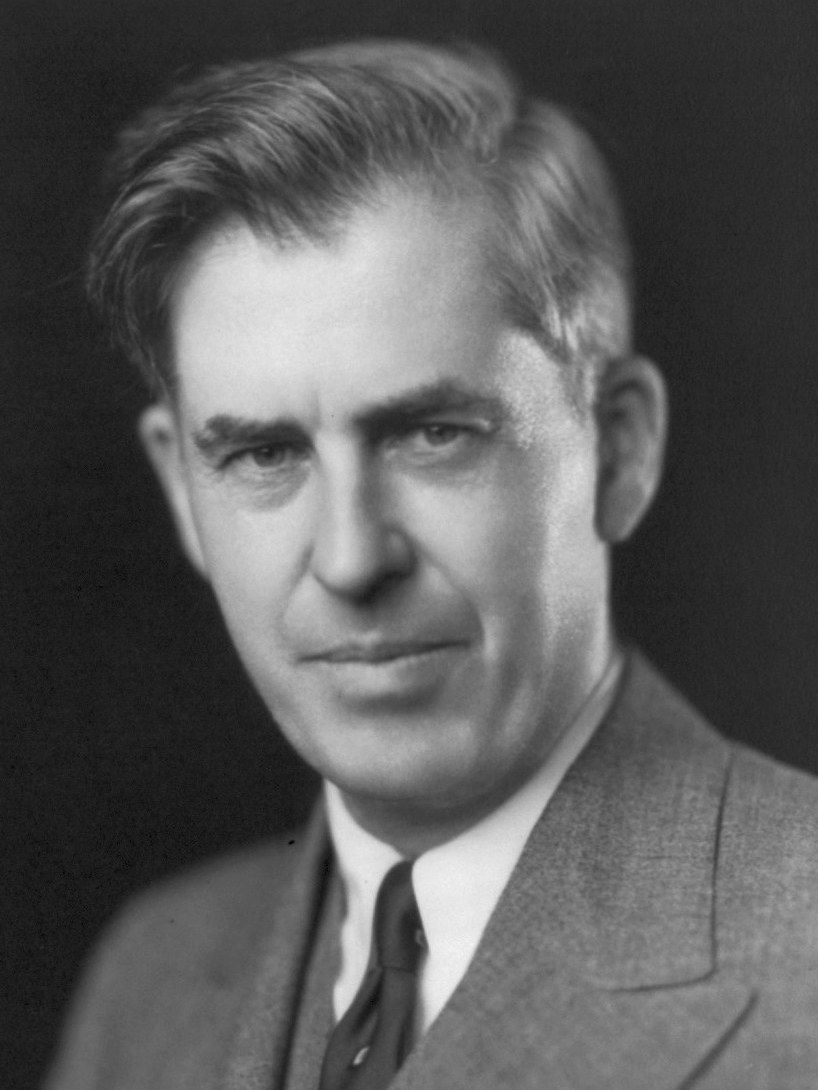
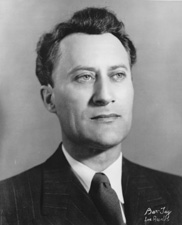
- Nominees; Wallace and Taylor

Convention
- Dates: July 23–25, 1948
- City: Philadelphia, Pennsylvania
- Venue: Philadelphia Convention Hall (main venue); Shibe Park (final night)
- Keynote speaker: Charles P. Howard Sr.

Candidates
- Presidential nominee: Henry A. Wallace of Iowa
- Vice-presidential nominee: Glen H. Taylor of Idaho

The 1948 Progressive National Convention was held in Philadelphia from July 23 to 25, 1948. The convention ratified the candidacies of former Vice President Henry A. Wallace from Iowa for president and U.S. Senator Glen H. Taylor from Idaho for vice president. The Progressive Party's platform opposed the Cold War and emphasized foreign policy.

== Background ==
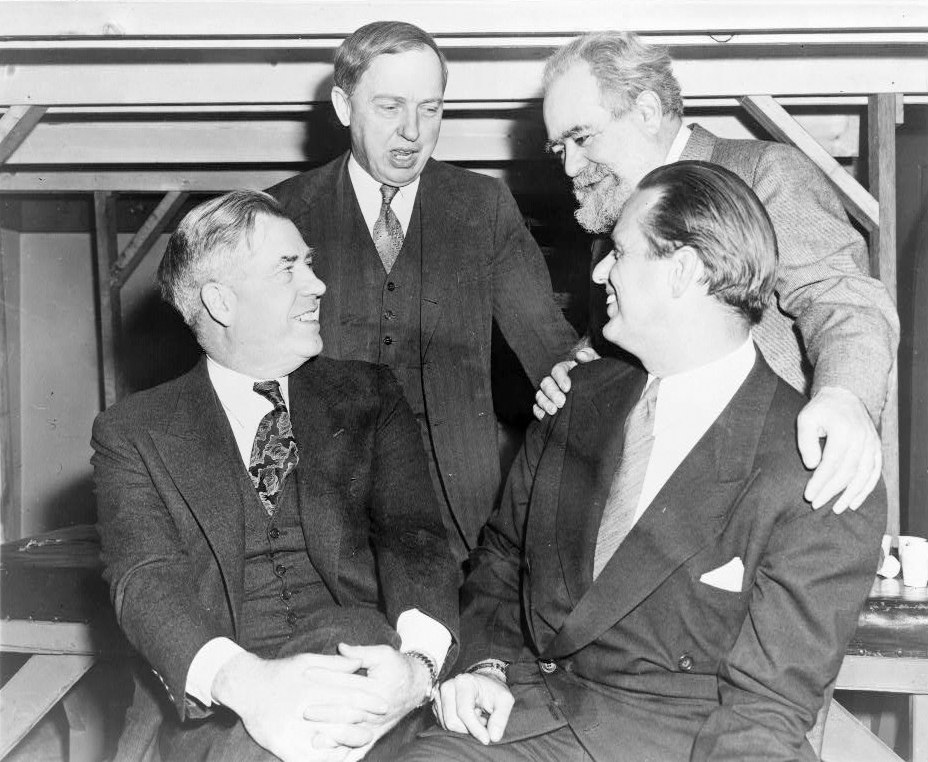
Progressive Citizens of America members, 1947. (Seated, L-R): Henry A. Wallace and Elliott Roosevelt (Standing, L-R): Dr. Harlow Shapley and Jo Davidson.

Henry Wallace who formed the Progressive Party in 1948 was deemed one of the most liberal idealists in the Roosevelt administration. He was the secretary of agriculture before he served as FDR's vice president during his (1941–45) third term, but was dropped from the ticket for the 1944 election. He later became secretary of commerce under FDR. Roosevelt died during his fourth term and Vice President Harry S. Truman succeeded to the presidency. He further resented Truman after the president fired Wallace, from his cabinet in 1946. In a speech, Wallace had broken with administration policy and became a public advocate for peaceful coexistence with the Soviet Union. Truman was unpopular in 1947, and some polls from the end of that year showed that Wallace had the support of more than 20% of the voters. Wallace started a left-wing independent candidacy under the name of the Progressive Party, named after two previous parties who used the name for the 1912 election and the 1924 election. He was supported by the American Labor Party, the Progressive Citizens of America, and other progressive groups in Illinois and California. Wallace would announce his candidacy in December 1947. The formal launch of the Progressive party was held in Philadelphia the following July.

== Vice presidential running mate ==
Wallace wanted a US Senator as his running mate, as he thought a Senator would add legitimacy and popular appeal to his fledgling party. After Florida Senator Claude Pepper declined Wallace's entreaties, Wallace approached Idaho Senator Glen H. Taylor about being his running mate. Taylor, a first term Democratic Senator, shared Wallace's concerns about President Truman, but was worried about his own career. A former country music singer, Taylor did not have a lucrative career to fall back on, and took his time considering Wallace's offer. Finally, Taylor accepted Wallace's offer, motivated by fears about rising Cold War tensions. In February 1948, Wallace announced that Senator Taylor had agreed to become his running mate.

== The convention ==
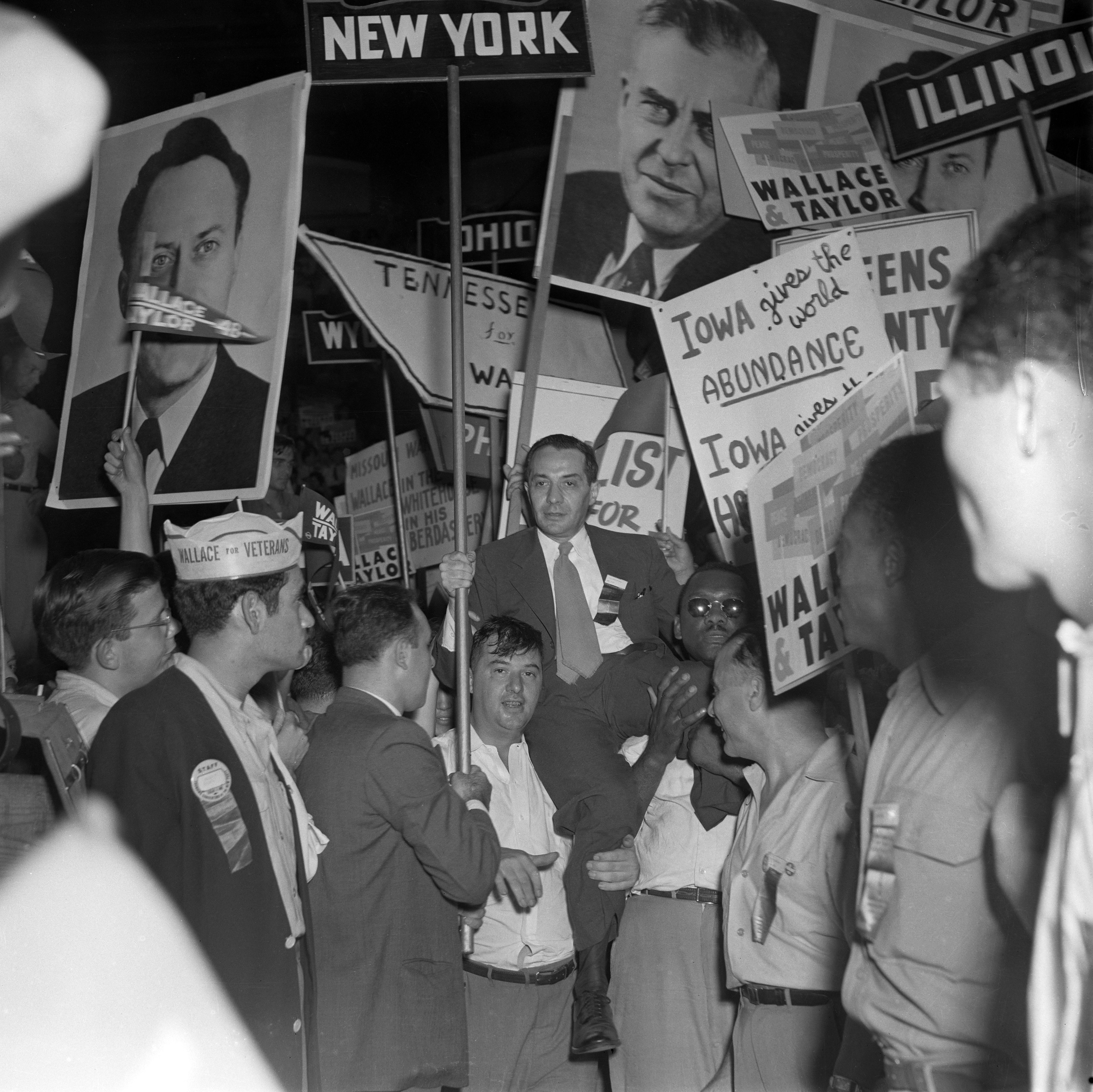
Congressman Vito Marcantonio is carried on the shoulders of delegates at the convention, July 23–25, 1948

By the time of the convention, the Wallace campaign had already peaked. By the time that the convention opened, Wallace's criticism of the Marshall Plan and "red baiting", had left Wallace and his supporters open to the charge of being "fellow travellers" if not being outright communists, a charge that was, for some at least, quite true. The New York Times characterized the party as already resigned to accept that Wallace would not win the election, and instead aiming to make a big enough splash in the 1948 elections to establish itself as a significant third party poised to win more offices in 1950 and 1952.

The convention began on July 23, 1948, at the Philadelphia Convention Hall (Municipal Auditorium). The same arena had hosted both the Republican convention and the Democratic convention in the weeks prior to the Progressive convention.

Held in Philadelphia following the two major party's conventions in that city, the third party Progressive convention was an impressive spectacle, and was well-attended. Among the delegates that gathered in the arena were such past and future luminaries as H. L. Mencken, Norman Mailer, Norman Thomas, Pete Seeger and George McGovern. There were also numerous FBI agents. The first item on the agenda was to formally name the party the Progressives. Wallace and Taylor were nominated by acclamation.

The final night of the convention, featuring the acceptance speeches, was held on July 25 and took place at Shibe Park, a Major League Baseball stadium. A crowd of 32,000 spectators attended the acceptance speech.

== Party platform ==
The party's 1948 platform opposed the Cold War and emphasized foreign policy. They called for the end of the Marshall Plan, Truman Doctrine, and nuclear weapons. They promoted coexistence with the Soviets and support for Israel. In domestic policy, the party supported civil rights, worker's rights and women's rights.

At the convention, a plank was offered by delegates from Vermont which would have read "although we are critical of the present foreign policy of the United States, it is not our intention to give blanket endorsement to the foreign policy of any nation". This proposal was defeated. Two years later, at the party's 1950 midterm convention, Wallace argued that it had been a mistake of the party not to adopt such a plank clarifying that it did not endorse Soviet foreign policy.

== Supporters ==
Underrepresented groups such as women, blacks, Hispanics, Jews, and youth were very active in the Progressive movement. The Communist Party was another supporter of the Progressive party. Wallace accepted the Communist Party's endorsement, characterizing his philosophy as "progressive capitalism". Their endorsement brought damage to the life of the party which was now portrayed as a left-wing front.

== Notable speeches ==
=== Keynote speech by Charles P. Howard Sr. ===
Charles P. Howard Sr.

Charles P. Howard Sr, an African American editor and former Republican Party member from Iowa, delivered the convention's keynote address during the convention's first evening. In one portion of his speech, Howard highlighted the Progressive platforms plank to abolish segregation in the United States military and challenged President Truman on his proclaimed commitment to civil rights civil rights, asserting that if Truman were truly committed, "let him issue an executive order abolishing racial discrimination in the armed forces." Four days later, Truman incidentally Executive Order 9981, which addressed this. Howard's keynote speech also highlighted various policy pledges of the Progressive Party.

In his speech Howard expressed that, as an African American individual, he felt that the welcome he received as the keynote speaker at the convention marked the first time he had "experienc[ed] human dignity". He criticized both Democrats and Republicans as giving too much lip service and too little action towards upholding equal rights for all American citizens and abolishing Jim Crow and white supremacy in the American South. Howard's speech also characterized the Soviets as wanting peace, and Americans as failing to sit with them to negotiate one. He warned that the choice in the election were "Wallace or war" and that the stakes of the election "the very survival of civilization and the life of our own sons". Regular convention had been brought to a pause in order to accommodate Howard's speech at the most favorable radio air-time for it to be heard by a broad audience.

=== Speech by Leo Isacson ===
New York Congressman Leo Isacson delivered a speech which The New York Times characterized as receiving the most enthusiastic cheers of the convention's opening evening. Isacson had been the first individual elected under the party's banner. The New York Times characterized the speech given by Isacson as being aimed at increasing the support of Jewish-American voters for the Progressive Party.

Isacson accused both Democrats and Republicans of planning to, after the conclusion of the election, renege on any declared support for a Jewish Israeli state. In his speech, Howard called for President Truman to immediately end an American arms embargo on Israel. He also urged for the United Nations to not extend its truce to the 1948 Arab–Israeli War, alleging that it was a gambit by the United States and United Kingdom to buy time so that Truman would not need to reveal purported anti-Jewish policies on Israel-Palestine until after the presidential election. He alleged that Republicans would also act against Israel after the election if their ticket was elected over Truman.

== Election outcome ==
Democratic nominee President Harry S. Truman with running mate Senator Alben Barkley from Kentucky, defeated Republican nominee Governor Thomas E. Dewey of New York and running mate Governor Earl Warren of California. Henry Wallace's Progressive Party received no electoral votes, but received 1,156,103 popular votes, coming in fourth place behind the States' Rights Democratic party, or the Dixiecrats.

Presidential candidate	Political party	Electoral votes	Popular votes
Harry S. Truman	Democratic	303	24,105,695
Thomas E. Dewey	Republican	189	21,969,170
Strom Thurmond	States' Rights Democratic (Dixiecrat)	39	1,169,021
Henry Wallace	Progressive Party	0	1,156,103

Preceded by N/A	Progressive National Conventions	Succeeded by 1950
