= Progressive Party (United States, 1948–1955) =

Political party in the United States (1948–1955)

- Abbreviation: PP
- Chair: Henry A. Wallace (IA)
- Deputy Chair: Glen H. Taylor (ID)
- Founded: 1948; 78 years ago
- Dissolved: 1955; 71 years ago
- Split from: Democratic Party
- Preceded by: Progressive Citizens of America
- Succeeded by: State Progressive Parties: CA, WA, OR, MN, VT; Indirectly: Citizens Party
- Newspaper: National Guardian
- Ideology: Progressivism; Left-wing populism
- Political position: Left-wing

The Progressive Party was a left-wing political party in the United States that served as a vehicle for the campaign of Henry A. Wallace, a former vice president, to become President of the United States in 1948. The party sought racial desegregation, the establishment of a national health insurance system, an expansion of the welfare system, and the nationalization of the energy industry. The party also sought conciliation with the Soviet Union during the early stages of the Cold War.

Wallace had served as vice president under Franklin D. Roosevelt but was dropped from the Democratic ticket in 1944. Following the end of World War II, Wallace emerged as a prominent critic of President Harry S. Truman's Cold War policies. Wallace's supporters held the 1948 Progressive National Convention, which nominated a ticket consisting of Wallace and Democratic Senator Glen H. Taylor of Idaho. Despite challenges from Wallace, Republican nominee Thomas E. Dewey, and Strom Thurmond of the segregationist Dixiecrats, Truman won election to a full term in the 1948 election. Wallace won 2.4% of the vote, which was far less than the share received by Theodore Roosevelt and Robert M. La Follette, the presidential nominees of the 1912 and 1924 Progressive Party tickets, respectively. Neither of those parties was directly related to Wallace's party, though these parties did carry over ideological groups and influenced many members of the 1948 Progressive Party.

In 1950, at the outbreak of the Korean War, Wallace recanted his foreign policy views and became estranged from his former supporters. The party nominated attorney Vincent Hallinan to run for president in 1952, and Hallinan won 0.2% of the national popular vote. The party began to disband in 1955 as opponents of anti-Communism became increasingly unpopular, and was fully dissolved, with the exception of a few affiliated state Progressive Parties by the late 1960s, later Minnesota Progressive Party's name was used by Eugene McCarthy as one of three minor state political parties supporting his independent campaign for president in 1988 (the other two being the Consumer Parties of Pennsylvania and New Jersey).

The Progressive Party of Henry Wallace was, and remains, controversial due to the issue of communist influence. The party served as a safe haven for communists, fellow travelers and anti-war liberals during the Second Red Scare. Prominent Progressive Party supporters included U.S. Representative Vito Marcantonio, writer Norman Mailer and, briefly, actress Ava Gardner.

== Ideology ==
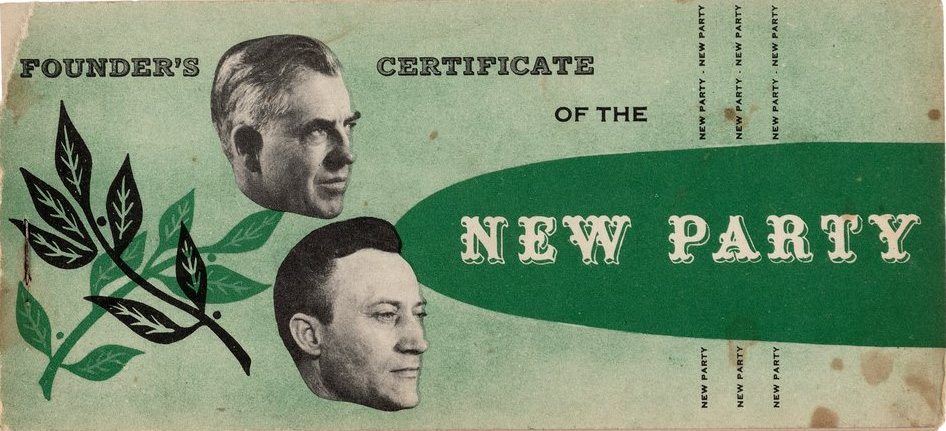
New Party founder's certificate donation booklet, 1948

The slogan of the "New Party", and the name many used to refer to the party forming around Henry Wallace, was appropriately "Fight for Peace". A major drive for Henry Wallace had always been the ending of the hostile relations between the Soviet Union and the United States and the acceptance of Soviet influence in Europe. Wallace had first espoused such views in 1944, but before long they took a more dramatic tone, as a sense of urgency and anxiety for peace settled in with the beginning of the arms race and the Cold War:

I urge elimination of groups and factions in this new party movement. This movement is as broad as humanity itself. I urge that we accept all people who wish for a peaceful understanding between the United States and Soviet Russia. [....] We can get the support of these people if they realize that we do not represent one group. If we are going to be a party of 20 million, there are going to be many kinds of people in that party. Keep the door open.

— Henry A. Wallace, from a speech in April 1948

While the "New Party" may be best remembered for its anti-war, pro-Soviet relations, it sought to include a very broad range of issues and interests. Wallace, and many others in the party, sought to create something more than a single-issue party, to the objection of other leaders in the party who felt that would be their undoing.

Among the policies the Progressive Party hoped to implement were the end of all Jim Crow laws and segregation in the South, the advancement of women's rights, the continuation of many New Deal policies including national health insurance and unemployment benefits, the expansion of the welfare system, and the nationalization of the energy industry among others.

== History ==
=== Foundation ===
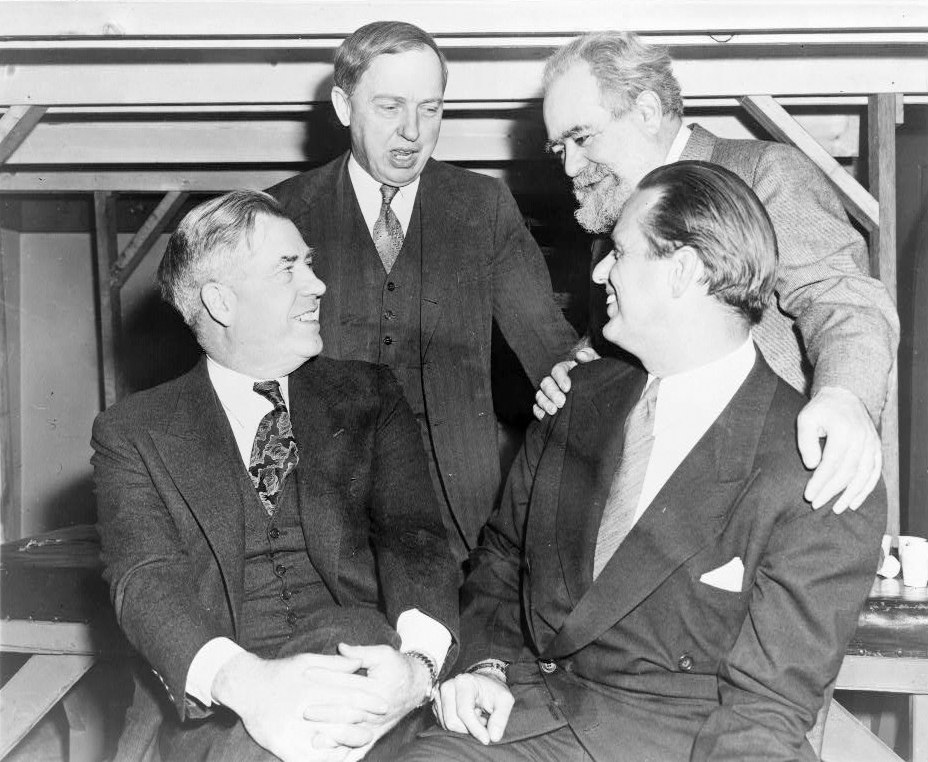
Progressive Citizens of America members, 1947. (Seated, L-R): Henry A. Wallace and Elliott Roosevelt (Standing, L-R): Dr. Harlow Shapley and Jo Davidson.

The formation of the Progressive Party began in 1946, after United States Secretary of Commerce and former Vice President and Secretary of Agriculture Henry A. Wallace was sacked in 1946 from the Truman administration having begun to publicly oppose Truman's policies. Calls for a third party had been growing even before Wallace, whom Franklin D. Roosevelt replaced as vice president with the more moderate Truman at the 1944 Democratic National Convention, left the Truman Administration.

The political action committee of the Congress of Industrial Organizations formed the National Citizens Political Action Committee (NCPAC) during the 1944 election to broaden its support outside of labor. The Independent Voters Committee, which was formed during the 1940 election, grew into the Independent Citizens Committee of the Arts, Sciences and Professions (ICCASP) in 1944.

Wallace dissented from the hard line that Truman was taking against the Soviet Union, a stance that won him favor among fellow travelers and others who were opposed to what became known as the Cold War. He received support from two major organizations, NCPAC and ICCASP. The NCPAC and ICCASP held a conference in Chicago from September 28–29, 1946, in order to discuss a common political strategy. Harold L. Ickes, Claude Pepper, Philip Murray, Jack Kroll, Walter White, and Henry Morgenthau Jr. were among the speakers. Morgenthau and White were both critical of efforts to form a third party.

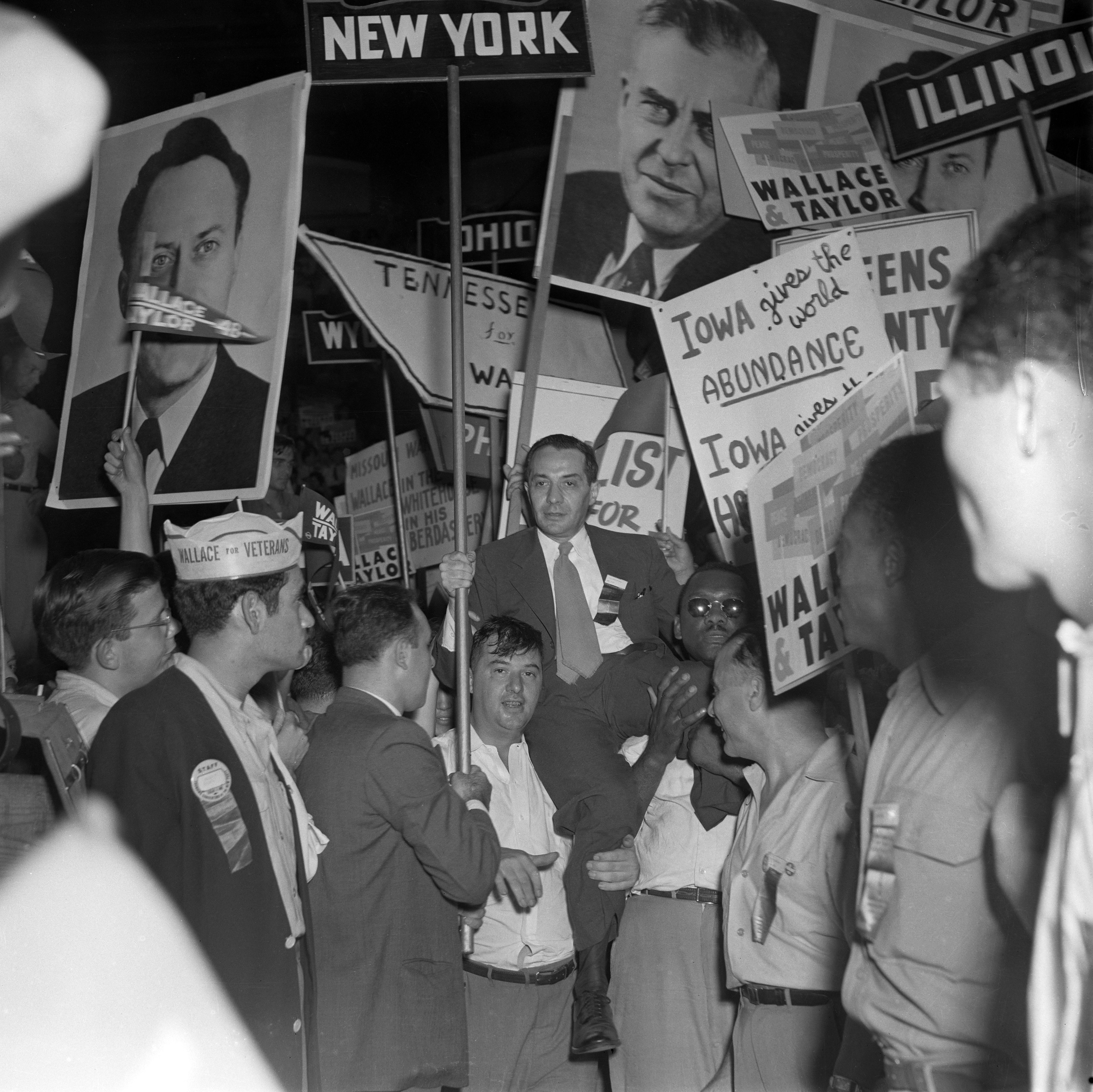
Congressman Vito Marcantonio is carried on the shoulders of delegates to the party's first convention, July 23–25, 1948

These two organizations merged on December 30 into the Progressive Citizens of America (PCA), which formed the backbone of the Progressive Party and Henry Wallace's bid for president on July 23–25, 1948, when the 1948 Progressive National Convention in Philadelphia launched a "New Party" to a crowd of enthusiastic liberal and left-leaning citizens. Carl Marzani's film of the convention, whose soundtrack consists of inspirational words and songs recorded elsewhere, shows both meetings leading up to the convention and the convention itself. Wallace and the PCA attempted to gain support from liberal Republicans, but U.S. Senator Wayne Morse rejected their efforts and stated that "the only hope for sane and sound progressive politics is through liberalizing the Republican party".

Whitney, who was previously critical of Truman and threatened to finance a third-party campaign, praised him after Truman vetoed the Taft–Hartley Act and stated that the veto "vindicated him in the eyes of labor". Whitney and Brotherhood of Railroad Trainmen had been supporters of Wallace since the 1944 convention. Kroll and the CIO announced on October 16, 1947, that they would not lead in the formation of a new political party.

The Independent Progressive Party was formed in California with the support of Francis Townsend's organization. The party needed to collect 275,970 signatures in three months in order to be on the 1948 ballot, but Wallace had not announced his presidential candidacy yet. The PCA announced its support for a Wallace candidacy on December 17. Wallace stated that during 1947 it was Frank Kingdon, co-chair of the PCA, that pressured him the most to run for president. However, Kingdon, who was seeking the Democratic nomination in New Jersey's U.S. Senate election, resigned as co-chair and stated that he wanted Wallace to run for the Democratic nomination rather than as a third-party candidate. Bartley Crum, vice-chair of the PCA, also resigned. Wallace launched his presidential campaign on December 29.

The American Labor Party (ALP) "formally organized itself as the New York branch of the Progressive Party." The ALP also helped form a "New York State Wallace for President" conference, held on April 3, 1948. During the Progressive Party's convention Elinor S. Gimbel was on the Arrangements committee, Leo Isacson on Credentials, Vito Marcantonio and John Abt on Rules, and Lee Pressman, W. E. B. Du Bois, and Mary Van Kleeck on Platform. The Progressives declined to create their own ballot line in New York and instead solely used the ALP's line.

Wallace was uninvolved with the creation of the party's organization and instead had Calvin Benham Baldwin manage it. The party held its national convention each year, rather than the traditional four, in the vein of the Labour Party.

=== 1948 election ===
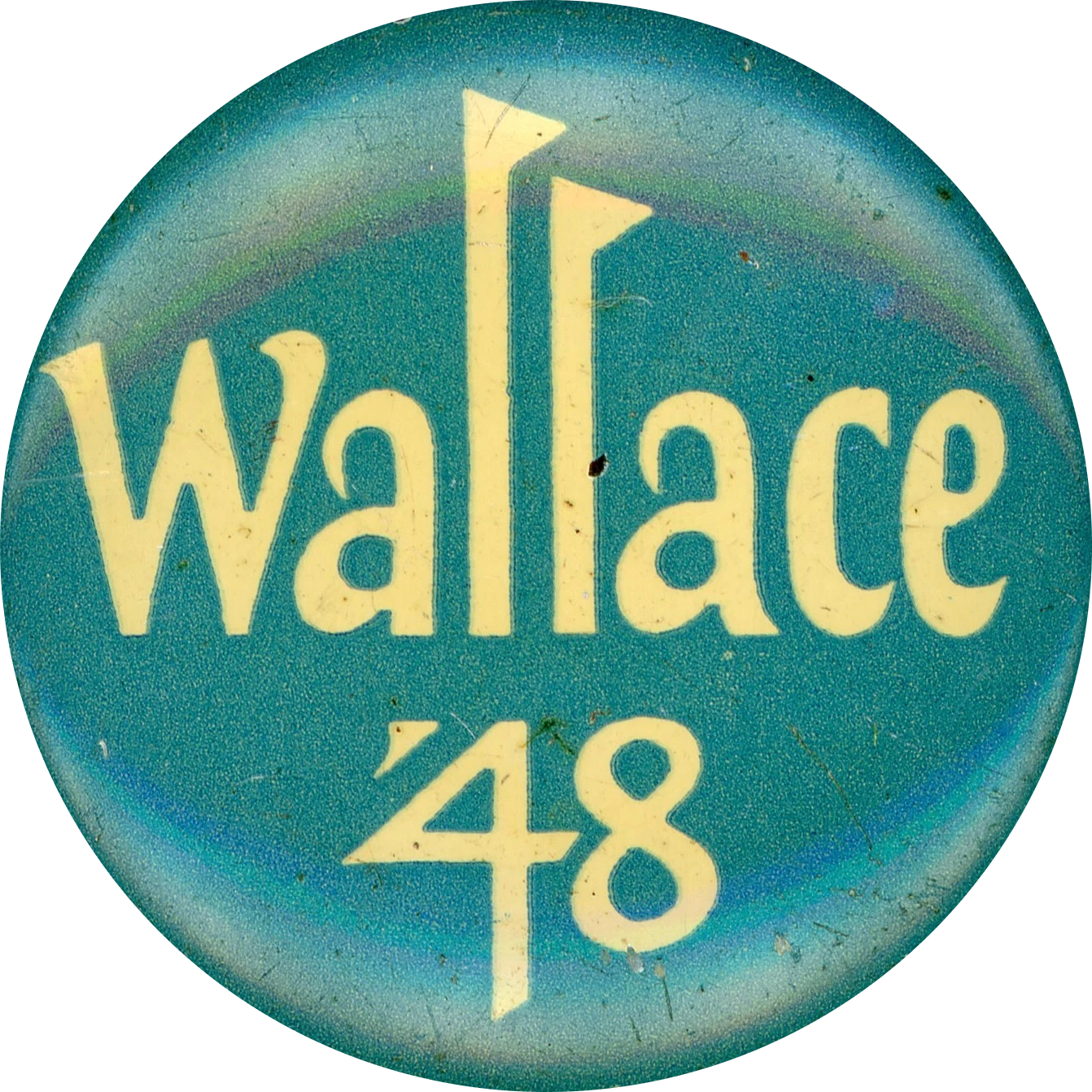
Henry Wallace Progressive Party 1948 presidential election campaign pin

The party suffered from a lack of union support. The CIO called for all of its ALP-affiliated unions to disaffiliate and the Amalgamated Clothing Workers of America withdrew its support of the ALP after the party endorsed Wallace for president. Albert Fitzgerald and Julius Emspak of United Electrical, Radio and Machine Workers of America formed a committee supporting Wallace, but were unable to have the executive board endorse him. The Steel Workers Organizing Committee and United Auto Workers opposed Wallace. William Green, president of the AFL, also opposed Wallace.

Isacson was elected to the United States House of Representatives from New York's 24th congressional district in a 1948 special election. Baldwin, Wallace's campaign manager, stated that Isacson's victory was proof that the United States wanted a new party.

Wallace attempted to gain the support of the Minnesota Democratic–Farmer–Labor Party. Wallace supporters controlled a majority of the DFL's executive committee and would have controlled the state convention had Hubert Humphrey not held an unscheduled meeting of the party's central committee. Humphrey was able to set all of the convention details and committees. Wallace's supporters only won 19 of the 85 county convention delegations and the convention's credentials committee refused to seat these delegates. Left-wing members of the DFL held a rival convention and nominated a slate of pro-Wallace electors. Secretary of State Mike Holm accepted the left-wing slate, but those electors were invalidated by a Minnesota Supreme Court ruling.

The party initially expected Wallace's campaign to cost around $3 million. This would come from fundraisers by the PCA, left-wing unions, and admissions to rallies. Anita McCormick Blaine, an heiress of International Harvester, donated over $100,000 to the party according to Wallace. The party planned on raising $1 million from union organizations, but only raised $9,025 compared to Truman's $1.5 million. The membership of the International Fur & Leather Workers Union, under the leadership of communist Ben Gold, was the largest union donors, with over $21,000. Over $3.3 million was raised during the campaign, $1.2 million at the national level and $1.3 million at the state and local level.

If all of the votes Wallace received had gone to Truman, then only the states of New York, Michigan, and Maryland would have gone to Truman instead of Dewey. Running as peace candidates in the nascent Cold War era, the Wallace-Taylor ticket garnered no votes in the United States Electoral College and only 2.4% of the popular vote, a far smaller share than most pundits had anticipated; some historians have suggested that the Progressive campaign did Truman more good than harm, as their strident criticism of his foreign policy helped to undercut Republican claims that the administration's policies were insufficiently anti-Communist. Nearly half of these votes came in New York (possibly tipping the state and its 47 electoral votes from Truman to Dewey), where Wallace ran on the ALP ballot line.

The Progressives ran 114 candidates for U.S. House across twenty-five states and nine U.S. Senate candidates. Marcantonio, who was an incumbent representative, was their only candidate to win and Isacson lost reelection. Taylor, who was the party's only member in the U.S. Senate, left and returned to the Democratic Party after the election.

=== 1948 state election results ===
In Massachusetts, the anti-war Progressive Party was active in 1948 and faced discrimination in this state also. On May 31, 1948, for instance, Mayor James Michael Curley of Boston, a Democrat, denied the use of the bandstand on the Boston Common to the Progressive Party of Massachusetts. The following month, however, on June 29, one of the African-American leaders of the Progressive Party, Paul Robeson, was allowed to speak in the Crystal Ballroom in Boston's Hotel Bradford. In Virginia, in 1948, Virginia Foster Durr ran for the U.S. Senate seat on the Progressive ticket.

The party had 228,688 registered voters in New York and 22,461 in California.

=== Disbandment ===
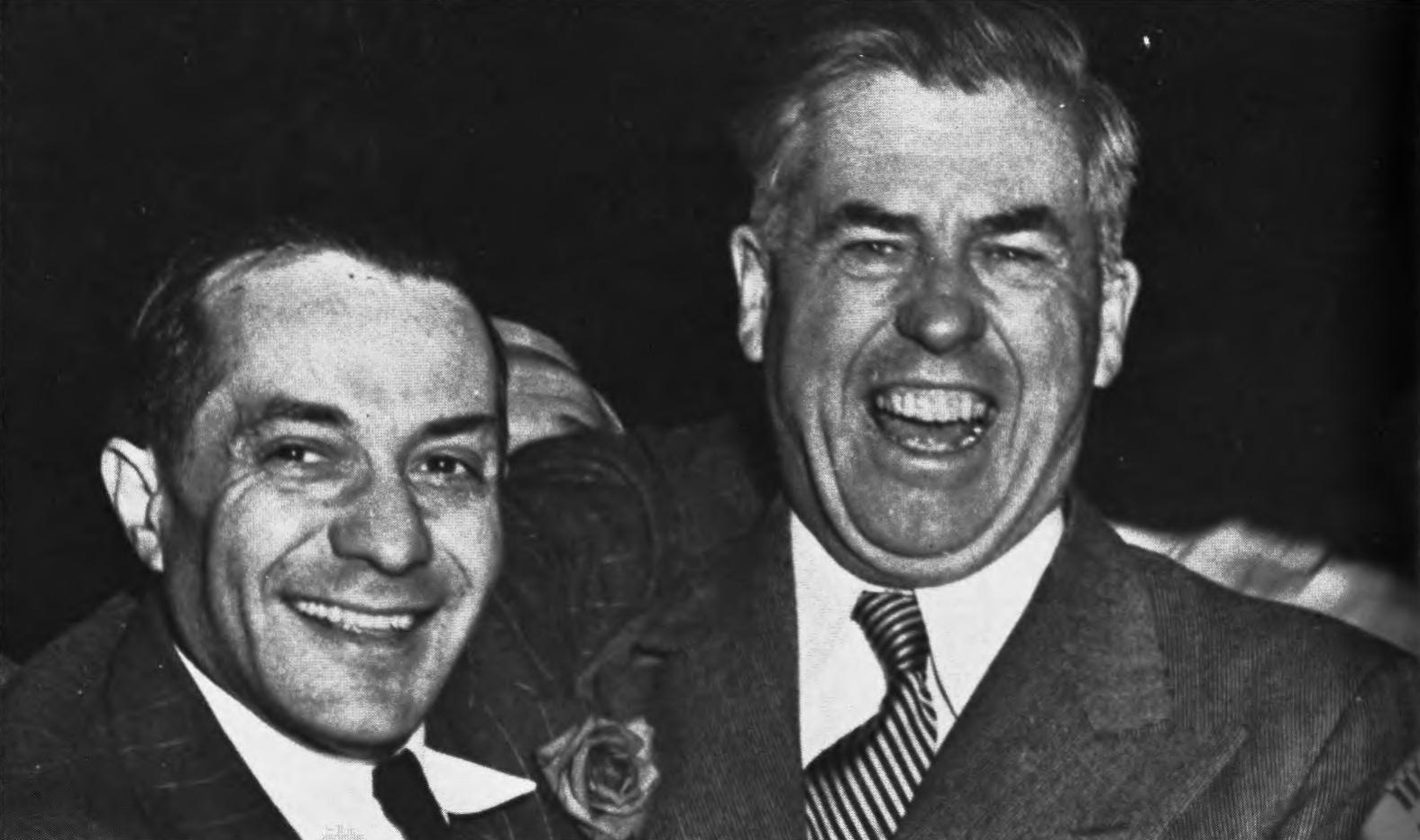
Congressman Vito Marcantonio (left) with former Vice President Henry A. Wallace at New York City's "Lucky Corner" on election eve, November 1, 1948

U.S. Senator Robert F. Wagner resigned in 1949, causing a special election to be held. Marcantonio sought to have Wallace run, which would have aided Marcantonio in the concurrent New York City mayoral election, but Wallace declined.

A second national convention was held in Chicago in February 1950, with around 1,200 delegates from 35 states in attendance. Wallace denounced communist members of the party and stated that "Our principles are vastly different from those of the Communist Party". Wallace proposed a program with ten points that would stop the United States from falling to war, fascism, and communism. The plank was heavily debated before Marcantonio ended it by giving his support to the plank.

After the 1948 election, Wallace grew increasingly estranged from the party. His speeches started to include mild criticism of Soviet foreign policy, which was anathema to many leftists in the party. The final break came in 1950, when the Progressive Party's executive committee issued a policy statement against US military involvement in Korea, and soundly rejected Wallace's proposed language criticizing the invasion by communist North Korea. Wallace came out in support of American intervention in the Korean War. O. John Rogge, James Stewart Martin, and John E. T. Camper supported Wallace's stance. Resolutions condemning Wallace's support for intervention were passed by the affiliates in Connecticut, Maryland, and New York. Wallace left the party three weeks after announcing his support for intervention. Martin, Camper, Thomas I. Emerson, Corliss Lamont, and others also left the party.

Marcantonio lost reelection to the U.S. House in the 1950 election. Vincent Hallinan and Charlotta Bass were the party's presidential and vice-presidential nominees in the 1952 United States presidential election. They received 140,000 votes nationally with around half being from New York. Peter J. Hawley, chair of the ALP, announced its dissolution in October 1956.

=== Communist influence ===
In 1948, 51% of people polled by the American Institute of Public Opinion believed that the Progressives were dominated by communists. Orson Welles, a friend of Roosevelt who had endorsed him in the 1944 election, refused to be involved with Wallace's presidential campaign. Welles later described Wallace as "a prisoner of the [U.S.] Communist Party. He would never do anything to upset them."^{p. 66} James Imbrie, the chair of the Progressive Party in New Jersey and 1949 gubernatorial nominee, rejected support from the New Jersey Communist Party.

In February 1948, two days before a special election put American Labor Party candidate Isacson into Congress, The New York Times analyzed the shifting background of the Progressive Party:

The question involved in the special election is how strongly the Labor [ALP] party vote will hold up after withdrawal of the ACWA and other anti-Communist unions from the Labor party because of its support of Mr. Wallace's candidacy for President, which has left the Communists and other left-wing elements in complete control of that party's organization.

More broadly, in the run-up to the presidential election, the Democrats nominated Harry Truman to run for a full term while New York Governor Thomas E. Dewey, who had lost to Roosevelt in 1944, was renominated by the Republican Party. Dewey had defeated the isolationist, non-interventionist senator Robert A. Taft of Ohio for the GOP nomination and favored an aggressive policy against the USSR.

The former Communist National Committee member Bella Dodd asserts in School of Darkness that the Progressive Party of 1948 had Wallace as its voice and "inspirational leader" but was really controlled by top U.S. Communists, in particular William Z. Foster and Eugene Dennis, who filled the staff of the new party with people loyal to themselves and dictated self-defeating policies to the Progressive Party. Dodd concluded:

The reason they wanted a small limited Progressive Party was because it was the only kind they could control. They wanted to control it because they wanted a political substitute for the Communist Party, which they expected would soon be made illegal. A limited and controlled Progressive Party would be a cover organization and a substitute for the Communist Party if the latter were outlawed.

Historians have disputed the degree to which Communists shaped the party. Most agree that Wallace paid very little attention to internal party affairs. Historians Schapsmeier and Schapsmeier argue (1970 p 181):

[The Progressive Party] stood for one thing and Wallace another. Actually the party organization was controlled from the outset by those representing the radical left and not liberalism per se. This made it extremely easy for Communists and fellow travelers to infiltrate into important positions within the party machinery. Once this happened, party stands began to resemble a party line. Campaign literature, speech materials, and campaign slogans sounded strangely like echoes of what Moscow wanted to hear. As if wearing moral blinkers, Wallace increasingly became an imperceptive ideologue. Words were uttered by Wallace that did not sound like him, and his performance took on a strange Jekyll and Hyde quality—one moment he was a peace protagonist and the next a propaganda parrot for the Kremlin.

One historian (further to the left than the Schapsmeiers) explores the internal dynamic (Schmidt 258–9):

- At one pole were the extreme leftists, three closely related groups—admitted Communists, past and present; the party-liners and fellow travelers who failed to differ noticeably with the Communists as to either policy or principle; and finally those non-Communists who, in … 1944–50 failed to take issue with the Communists on policy, but whose underlying principles seemingly differed.…
- In the middle were grouped an apparently large majority of Progressive Party followers—the moderates. Exemplified by both national candidates, these individuals were willing to accept Communist support, because they felt that it was inconsistent, in the light of their ideals, to oppose Redbaiting by others, yet attempt to read Communists out of the new party.
- At the right were arrayed those who, feeling that Communist support should have been disavowed in no uncertain terms, yet were unwilling to adopt the ADA tactic of violent attack on the Communists. This group would have approved making the Progressives "non-Communist" rather than "anti-Communist", excluding but not assailing the Reds. Most persons sharing this view had, like Max Lerner, completely avoided the party, but others like Rexford Guy Tugwell joined and stayed, if reluctantly, through the campaign.…
- In the period following 1948, party members were hounded by the House Unamerican Activities Committee, from job to job. Members found themselves fired from even the lowest of day labor jobs by FBI agents and others. Although historians point out that groups tended to leave the party in the order of their views from right to left, with most of the rightists departing during or shortly after the campaign, accompanied by many of the moderates. And the moderate defection, so marked following election day, 1948, becoming a nearly complete walkout in the summer of 1950, with the policy rift over Korea and Wallace's departure. Consequently, by the close of 1951 the few remaining portions of the Wallace Progressive Party were composed almost exclusively of the earlier extreme left group. These were the ones who had favored a "narrow" organization; after the Wallace break, they finally achieved this goal, with the departure of almost everyone else, this does not take into account the huge pressure to conform and stop the activism by HUAC and FBI. The fact that the member of congress defeated by Joe McCarthy was Robert La Follette Jr, as an irony not lost on these activists.

In her book School of Darkness (1954), Bella Dodd, an American Communist Party National Committee member who later left and went on to give anti-Communist testimony before Congress, wrote about a June 1947 Communist National Committee meeting she attended at which the founding of the 1948 Progressive Party was planned:

The point of it all came near the end, when [John] Gates read that a third party would be very effective in 1948, but only if we could get Henry Wallace to be its candidate.

There it was, plainly stated. The Communists were proposing a third party, a farmer-labor party, as a political maneuver for the 1948 elections. They were even picking the candidate.

When Gates had finished, I took the floor. I said that while I would not rule out the possibility of building a farmer-labor party, surely the decision to place a third party in 1948 should be based not on whether Henry Wallace would run, but on whether a third party would help meet the needs of workers and farmers in America. And if a third party were to participate in the 1948 elections, the decision should be made immediately by bona-fide labor and farmer groups, and not delayed until some secret and unknown persons made the decision.

My remarks were heard in icy silence. When I had finished, the committee with no answer to my objection simply went on to other work.

However, it was becoming evident that the top clique was having a hard time with this proposition. It was also clear that [Eugene] Dennis and his clique of smart boys were reserving to themselves the right to make the final decision, and that the Party in general was being kept pretty much in the dark.

== Impact ==
=== Organizations ===
The 1948 Progressive Party is only tenuously connected to the original Progressive Party (1912–1932).

Members of the 1948 Progressive Party, however, have joined the later state Progressive Parties, thus linking the 1948-1960s group to the Vermont Progressive Party, Wisconsin Progressive Party, Minnesota Progressive Party, California Progressive Party, Oregon Progressive Party, and Washington Progressive Party, as well as the Citizens Party of the 1980s and 90s.

=== Pop culture ===
One of The Kingston Trio's most popular folk songs in the 1950s, "The MTA Song", was written by supporters of the Progressive Party of Massachusetts' 1949 Boston mayoralty candidate, Walter A. O'Brien. After Boston's publicly funded MTA purchased the privately owned Boston Elevated Railway's subway and trolley system for $30 per share more than each share was worth, the MTA imposed a fare increase on the citizens of Boston. Progressive Party mayoral candidate O'Brien then led unusually large protests against the MTA fare increase before the 1949 mayoral election. But although his campaign's anti-fare increase song was subsequently turned into a national hit record in the 1950s, O'Brien failed to win the local Boston election in 1949.

When The Kingston Trio decided to record "The MTA Song", it was apparently agreed to change the first name of the O'Brien referred to in the song from "Walter" to "George", because it was feared that a hit record which referred to "Walter O'Brien" would make it even more difficult than it already was for the former Progressive Party candidate to find a New England employer who was willing to hire him during the McCarthy Era.

== Prominent supporters ==
Henry Wallace's bid for the presidency attracted the support of many prominent people in academia and the arts. Among those who publicly supported Wallace were Larry Adler, George Antheil, Marc Blitzstein, Kermit Bloomgarden, Morris Carnovsky, Lee J. Cobb, Aaron Copland, Howard da Silva, W. E. B. DuBois, Albert Einstein, Howard Fast, Ava Gardner, Uta Hagen, Dashiell Hammett, Lillian Hellman, Judy Holliday, Libby Holman, John Huston, Burl Ives, Sam Jaffe, Garson Kanin, Howard E. Koch, John Howard Lawson, Canada Lee, Norman Mailer, Albert Maltz, Thomas Mann, Lewis Milestone, Arthur Miller, Clifford Odets, Linus Pauling, S. J. Perelman, Anne Revere, Budd Schulberg, Adrian Scott, Artie Shaw, Philip Van Doren Stern, I. F. Stone, Louis Untermeyer, Mark Van Doren, Frank Lloyd Wright, Charlie Chaplin, Oona O'Neill, Gregory Peck, Lena Horne, Edward G. Robinson, Jose Ferrer, Gene Kelly, Zero Mostel, Pete Seeger, Paul Robeson, Katharine Hepburn.

Lawson, Maltz and Scott were members of the Hollywood Ten, members of the movie industry who were called before the House Un-American Activities Committee (HUAC) for suspected membership in the Communist Party. Many of Wallace's public supporters were similarly brought before HUAC and were blacklisted if they did not cooperate.

== Electoral history ==
=== Federal Offices ===
U.S. Presidency
Year	Nominee	Running-mate	# votes	% votes (Nationally)	% votes (Where Balloted)	Place	Performance Map
1948	Henry A. Wallace	Glen H. Taylor	1,157,328	2.37 / 100 (Note: Of 48,792,535 votes)	2.65 / 100 (Note: Of 43,597,950 votes)	4th	
1952	Vincent Hallinan	Charlotta Bass	140,746	0.23 / 100 (Note: Of 61,751,942 votes)	0.32 / 100 (Note: Of 43,907,430 votes)	3rd	

U.S. Senator
Election	State	Nominee	Fusion	Votes			State	Nominee	Fusion	Votes			Seats	
Election	State	Nominee	Fusion	No.	Share	Place	State	Nominee	Fusion	No.	Share	Place	Seats	
1948	Colorado	John Gurule	Progressive	2,981	0.58 / 100	3rd	New Hampshire	John G. Rideout	Progressive	1,538	0.69 / 100	3rd	0 / 100	Steady
1948	Delaware	Hamilton D. Ware	Progressive	681	0.48 / 100	3rd	New Jersey	James Imbrie	Progressive	22,658	1.21 / 100	3rd	0 / 100	Steady
1948	Idaho	John Derr	Progressive	3,154	1.47 / 100	3rd	New Mexico	Brígido Provencio	Progressive	705	0.37 / 100	3rd	0 / 100	Steady
1948	Iowa	Seymour Pitcher	Progressive	3,387	0.34 / 100	3rd	North Carolina	William T. Brown	Progressive	3,490	0.46 / 100	3rd	0 / 100	Steady
1948	Kentucky	H. G. Stanfield	Progressive	924	0.12 / 100	4th	Virginia	Virginia Foster Durr	Progressive	5,347	1.38 / 100	4th	0 / 100	Steady
1950	Maryland	Samuel Fox	Progressive	6,143	1.00 / 100	3rd	New York	W. E. B. Du Bois	American-Labor	205,729	3.94 / 100	3rd	0 / 100	Steady
1950	Oregon	Harlin Talbert	Progressive	10,165	2.02 / 100	3rd	Pennsylvania	Lillian R. Narins	Progressive	5,516	0.16 / 100	5th	0 / 100	Steady
1952	California	Reuben W. Borough	Progressive	542,270	11.95 / 100	2nd	Missouri	Haven P. Perkins	Progressive	883	0.05 / 100	3rd	0 / 100	Steady
1952	Indiana	Carl Leon Eddy	Progressive	891	0.05 / 100	4th	New Jersey	Katharine A. Van Orden	Progressive	7,195	0.31 / 100	3rd	0 / 100	Steady
1952	Minnesota	Marian Le Sueur	Progressive	7,917	0.57 / 100	3rd	New York	Corliss Lamont	American Labor	104,702	1.50 / 100	4th	0 / 100	Steady
1952	Montana	Larry Price	Progressive	1,828	0.70 / 100	3rd	Washington	Thomas C. Rabbitt	Progressive	1,912	0.18 / 100	3rd	0 / 100	Steady
1954	California	Isobel M. Cerney	Progressive	26,667	1.68 / 100	3rd							0 / 100	Steady

U.S. House of Representatives
Election	Nominees	Votes			Seats		Totals					Control	Performance Map
Election	Nominees	No.	Share	Share (Where Contesting)	No.	±	Votes	Vote Share	Vote Share (Where Contesting)	Seats	±	Control	Performance Map
1948	77 P	359,236	0.78 / 100 (Note: Of 46,219,517 votes)	3.67 / 100 (Note: Of 9,777,773 votes)	0 / 435	Steady	772,370	1.67 / 100 (Note: Of 46,219,517 votes)	3.67 / 100 (Note: Of 14,709,376 votes)	1 / 435	Steady	Democratic	
1948	36 AL	413,134	0.89 / 100 (Note: Of 46,219,517 votes)	8.38 / 100 (Note: Of 4,931,603 votes)	1 / 435	Steady	772,370	1.67 / 100	3.67 / 100	1 / 435	Steady	Democratic	
1950	23 P	127,985	0.85 / 100 (Note: Of 40,429,556 votes)	4.49 / 100 (Note: Of 2,853,005 votes)	0 / 435	Steady	343,236	0.85 / 100 (Note: Of 40,429,556 votes)	4.72 / 100 (Note: Of 7,272,039 votes)	0 / 435	▼1	Democratic	
1950	39 AL	215,251	0.53 / 100 (Note: Of 40,429,556 votes)	4.87 / 100 (Note: Of 4,419,034 votes)	0 / 435	▼1	343,236	0.85 / 100	4.72 / 100	0 / 435	▼1	Democratic	
1952	23 P	145,171	0.25 / 100 (Note: Of 57,570,740 votes)	3.73 / 100 (Note: Of 3,889,517 votes)	0 / 435	Steady	240,117	0.42 / 100 (Note: Of 57,570,740 votes)	2.40 / 100 (Note: Of 10,010,499 votes)	0 / 435	Steady	Republican	
1952	38 AL	94,946	0.16 / 100 (Note: Of 57,570,740 votes)	1.55 / 100 (Note: Of 6,120,982 votes)	0 / 435	Steady	240,117	0.42 / 100	2.40 / 100	0 / 435	Steady	Republican	
1954	3 P	6,614	0.02 / 100 (Note: Of 42,582,927 votes)	2.07 / 100 (Note: Of 319,222 votes)	0 / 435	Steady	21,174	0.05 / 100 (Note: Of 42,582,927 votes)	1.06 / 100 (Note: Of 1,991,614 votes)	0 / 435	Steady	Democratic	
1954	15 AL	14,560	0.03 / 100 (Note: Of 42,582,927 votes)	0.87 / 100 (Note: Of 1,672,392 votes)	0 / 435	Steady	21,174	0.05 / 100	1.06 / 100	0 / 435	Steady	Democratic	

== See also ==
- Members of the Progressive Party (United States, 1948)
- Progressive Party (United States, 1948) politicians
- 1948 Progressive National Convention
- 1952 Progressive National Convention
- Progressive Citizens of America (PCA)
- Progressive Party (United States, 1912)
- Progressive Party (United States, 1924–1927)
- Jencks v. United States

== Works cited ==
- Schmidt, Karl (1960). Henry A. Wallace: Quixotic Crusade 1948. Syracuse University Press. ISBN 978-0-8156-0020-6.

== Further reading and sources ==
- Busch, Andrew E. "Last Gasp: Henry A. Wallace and the End of the Popular Front" Reviews in American History 42#4 (2014), pp. 712–17. online
- Culver, John; Hyde, John (2000). American dreamer: the life and times of Henry A. Wallace. New York: Norton. ISBN 0393322289. OCLC 804488410.
- Devine, Thomas W. The eclipse of Progressivism: Henry A. Wallace and the 1948 presidential election (The University of North Carolina Press, 2000). See online review
- Hesseltine, William B. (1957). The Rise and Fall of Third Parties: From Anti-Masonry to Wallace. Gloucester, Mass.: P. Smith. ISBN 0844612375. OCLC 185063.
- Lovin, Hugh T. "New Deal Leftists, Henry Wallace and ‘Gideon’s Army,’ and the Progressive Party in Montana, 1937—1952" Great Plains Quarterly 43#4 (2012), pp. 273–86. online
- Markowitz, Norman D. (1973). The Rise and Fall of the People's Century: Henry A. Wallace and American Liberalism, 1941–1948. New York: Free Press. OCLC 1017763077. online
- MacDougall, Curtis Daniel (1965). Gideon's Army. New York: Marzani & Munsell. OCLC 1074676. Reviewed in Johnson, Oakley C. (January 1, 1967). "A Time of Heroes" (PDF). Freedomways. 7 (1): 90–94. ISSN 0016-061X. JSTOR community.28036998. Three volumes:

v. 1. The components of the decision
v. 2. The decision and the organization
v. 3. The campaign and the vote

- Nash, Howard P. Jr.; Hesseltine, W.B. (1959). Third Parties in American Politics. With ills compiled by M.B. Schnapper and an introd. by W.B. Hesseltine. Washington: Public Affairs Press. OCLC 943180107.
- Schapsmeier, Edward; Schapsmeier, Frederick H. (1970). Prophet in politics : Henry A. Wallace and the war years, 1940-1965. Ames, Iowa: The Iowa State University Press. ISBN 081381295X. OCLC 1004915002. online; also see online review
- White, Graham; Maze, J. R. (1995). Henry A. Wallace : his search for a new world order. Chapel Hill: University of North Carolina Press. ISBN 0807821896. OCLC 30700369.
- Walker, J (1976). Henry A. Wallace and American foreign policy. Westport, Conn: Greenwood Press. ISBN 0837187745. OCLC 1145223548. online
