= 1952 Progressive National Convention =

American political event

- 1952 presidential election
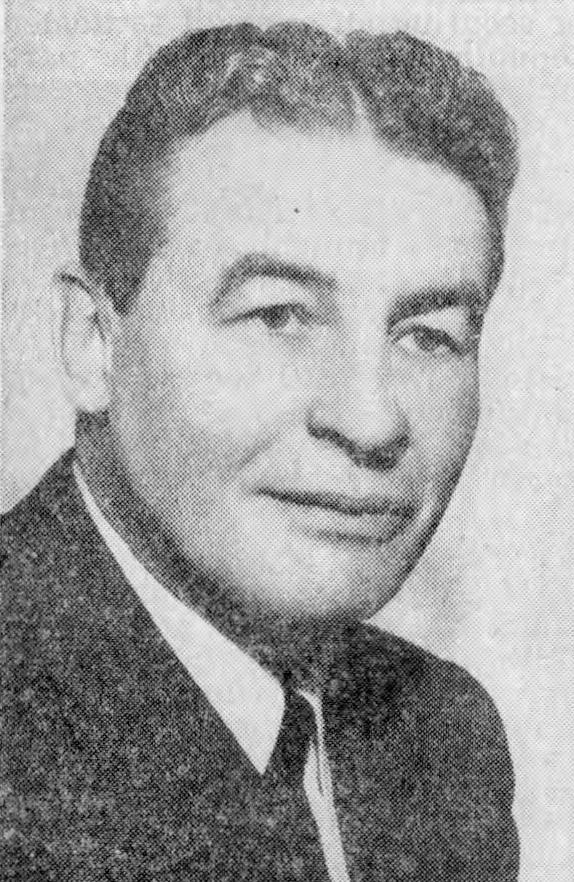
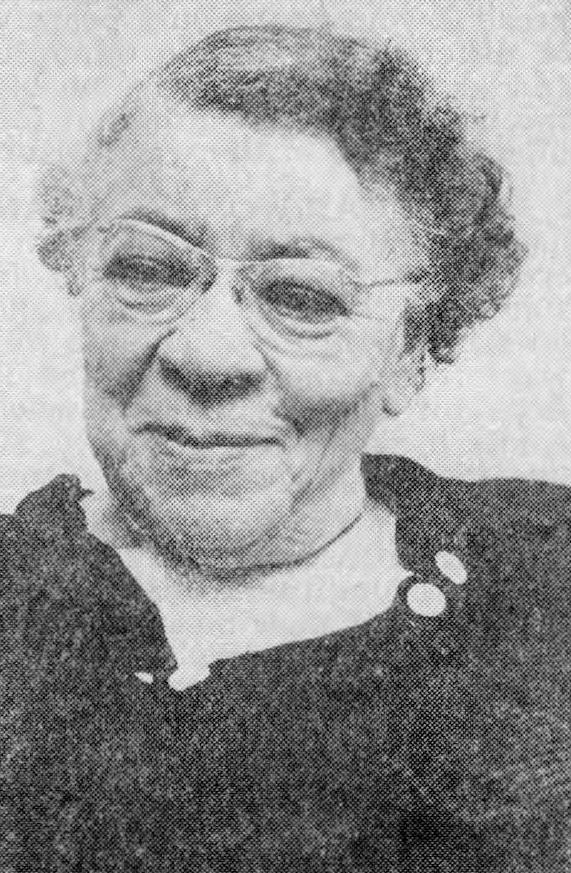
- Nominees; Hallinan and Bass

Convention
- Dates: July 4–6, 1952
- City: Chicago, Illinois
- Venue: Ashland Boulevard Auditorium
- Chair: Vito Marcantonio
- Keynote speaker: W. E. B. Du Bois
- Notable speakers: Elmer A. Benson; Robert Morss Lovett; Paul Robeson

Candidates
- Presidential nominee: Vincent Hallinan of California
- Vice-presidential nominee: Charlotta Bass of New York

Voting
- Total delegates: 2,000

The 1952 Progressive National Convention was held in July 4–6 1952 at the Ashland Boulevard Auditorium in Chicago, Illinois. The party ratified the 1952 presidential nominees and party platform of the Progressive Party, a short-lived minor American political party that had been founded in 1948.

The convention ratified the party's selection of Vincent Hallinan and Charlotta Bass to be its presidential and vice presidential nominees. Bass (an African American woman) became the first woman of color to be nominated for vice president. Hallinan was unable to attend the convention due to serving jail time for contempt of court. A presidential nomination acceptance speech was read on his behalf by his wife, Vivian. Bass attended the convention and delivered a vice presidential nomination acceptance speech. W. E. B. Du Bois, the convention's temporary chairman, delivered the convention's keynote speech.

Hallinan and Bass received 140,000 votes in the general election, which amounted to 0.2% of the popular vote. This was far less than the 1,157,326 (2% of the popular vote) that the party had received in the 1948 election.

== Background ==
=== Progressive Party ===
The Progressive Party was a left wing party. The Progressive Party was formed ahead of the preceding 1948 presidential election as a collective of several left wing groups and parties. Among these was Communist Party USA (the American Communist Party). The Communist Party had come to see its involvement in the new Progressive Party as more likely to result in electoral success than running candidates under its own label, due to communism's growing unpopularity in the United States amid the rise of the Cold War. It therefore was a member organization of the Progressive Party for the 1948 presidential elections, rather than running its own nominees. In 1948 election, former vice president Henry A. Wallace served as the party's presidential nominee, with Glen H. Taylor as his vice presidential running mate. Despite early projections of Wallace receiving as much as 10% or 20% of the popular vote, the party's ticket ultimately won a disappointing 2% of the popular vote. The party was perhaps harmed in the election by the active participation of the American Communist Party in the party, which was off-putting to non-communist voters.

In the years since the 1948 election (amid the Red Scare), many of the Progressive Party's national leaders had been accused by the American government of being communists and subversives. Wallace (the party's founder and its 1948 presidential nominee) was absent from the convention. Wallace had disassociated himself from the party and its membership soon after the start of the Korean War in reaction to the accusations levied by the government against key party figures. In April 1952, columnist Victor Riesel derided the then-upcoming convention as "the biggest propaganda show" of "the Pro-Soviet apparatus in this country." By 1952, it had become a rump of what it had been in 1948. Decades later, University of Pittsburgh history professor Richard Jules would reflect that after 1948, the Progressive Party, "faltered on through the 1952 campaign, but was justifiably viewed by most non-Communist observers as little more than a Communist front".

In his report on the opening day of the convention, Ray Dorsey of the Cleveland Plain Dealer described the party as "far to the left" writing that,

Joseph Stalin would have smiled contently if he could have heard the panel discussion which opened the meeting this afternoon. He would have heard speakers urging that the United States agree to Red terms for peace in Korea. He would have heard them plead for United States recognition of Red China.

=== Convention logistics ===
Ashland Boulevard Auditorium, photographed in 1920

The convention's theme was "The People Speak – for Peace". The three-day convention had 2,000 delegates and approximately 2,500 total participants. It took place at the Ashland Boulevard Auditorium on the West Side of Chicago. The city of Chicago was also set to host the Republican convention and the Democratic convention that same month. The Progressive Party had previously held a non-presidential national party convention at the Ashland Boulevard Auditorium in 1950. The 1952 convention concluded on July 6, the eve of the Republican convention.

The convention took place during particularly hot summer weather in Chicago, and the interior of the convention venue is remembered to have been especially hot due to its lighting.

== Convention leadership and notable participants ==
W. E. B. Du Bois (an alternate delegate to the convention) served as the convention's temporary chairman for its first evening. On the second day of the convention, former congressman Vito Marcantonio was voted to serve as the permanent chairman for the remainder of the convention. Pauline Taylor (chairwoman of the Ohio state party) served as the convention's permanent secretary. Among the top figures in the party's leadership at the time of the convention was the party's secretary Calvin Benham Baldwin, who was also involved in the convention.

Among the other notable participants in the convention were Hugh De Lacy (former congressman) and Willard Ransom (Indiana NAACP leader).

== Nominees ==
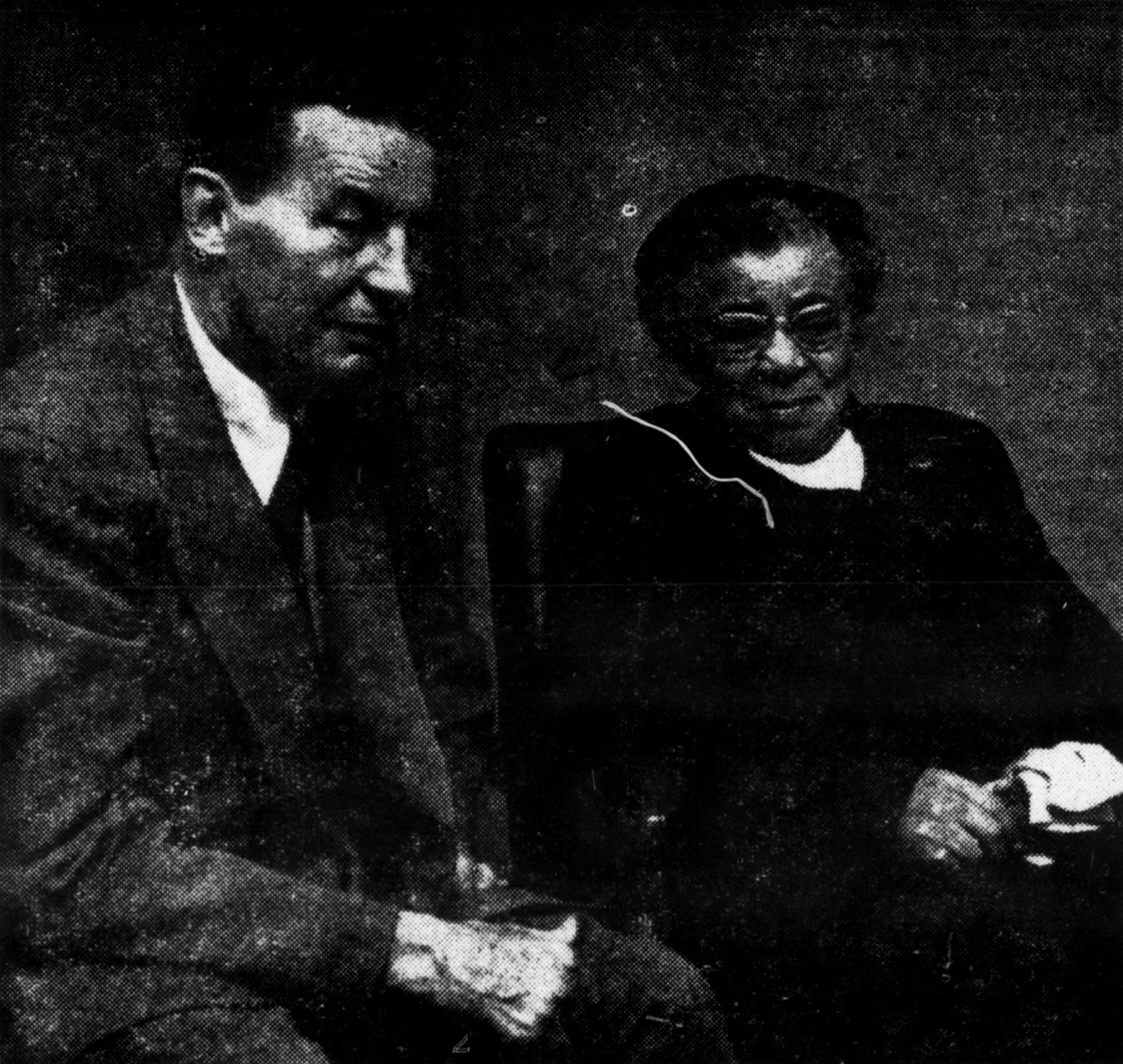
The two nominees photographed together during their campaign

In March 1952, the Progressive Party's national committee selected its presidential ticket in a party meeting held in Chicago. Vincent Hallinan was chosen for president and Charlotta Bass was chosen for vice president. Bass (an African American woman) was the first woman of color nominated for vice president. The convention in part served to have the party's delegates formalize the nomination of this ticket. The nomination vote was held on the second day of the convention.

Reporter Sidney Roger (a leftist, and attendee of the 1952 Progressive convention) would later reflect in the 1990s on the convention and its nominees, remarking,

It was the end of the Progressive party. Conventions are made up of groups and cliques who have different aims. Much of any convention is "behind doors." I was not privy to what was going on behind the doors—and wasn't interested. The idea of nominating Vincent Hallinan was ridiculous. He had the money to afford it, but he couldn't be there. He was in jail for contempt of court in the Bridges case. He was hardly known. It was a shot in the dark... He ran unopposed [for the nomination]. His running mate was a charming, elderly Negro lady, Charlotta Bass, publisher of a lively Negro newspaper in Los Angeles. Everyone attempted to keep a road show going, an illusion that there still was a Progressive party. Wallace was long out of the picture...I knew it was a futile effort. Let's face it, the purpose of a third party in this country is not to have delusions of electing a president—but to reach a public that will listen to issues that are not usually discussed. Wallace was known and could speak to a public willing to listen. Hallinan was an unknown quantity. It was a futile show. Who could listen to him discussing issues while he was in prison?

== Party platform ==
The party's platform was adopted on July 5. The co-chairs of the convention's platform committee were Earl B. Dickerson (president of the National Lawyers Guild), Katherine Van Orden, and Hugh Bryson. Dickerson touted the party's platform as promising on civil rights for African Americans, arguing that both party's had proven unable to pass civil rights legislation. Dickerson remarked, "the undeniable fact is that not since 1875 has either party passed a single law to implement equality."

The initial draft of the platform called for:

- Ending the Korean War through negotiation (party literature in advance of the platform's adoption had dubbed the war "a useless and senseless intervention")
- Seating the People's Republic of China (Chinese Communist Party-led government of mainland China) in the United Nations
- An "end of United States intervention throughout the world"
- An end to the United States' blockade of Formosa (part of the First Taiwan Strait Crisis)
- An extensive plan (to be sponsored by the United Nations, and developed in collaboration with the People's Republic of China) that would rehabilitate the Asian continent

=== Peace ===
The platform called peace "the mandate of the people".

Calvin Benham Baldwin (party secretary) said that the party would, "demand a formula which will allow the American people to live at peace with the 200,000,000 people of the Soviet Union and the 460,000,000 people of China."

The platform called for:

- Rejecting "the idea that war is inevitable"
- Ending "the biggest graft of all: the war-racket"
- A ceasefire to the Korean War
- Cooperation between the United States and the Soviet Union
- Disarmament
  - Disarmament in Germany: "stop the rearmament and renazification of a disunited Germany. We must work out an agreement at the conference table with England, France, and the Soviet Union to make Germany united and disarmed neutral.
  - Opposition to rearming Japan, and calling for "a conference of all the former belligerents against Japan for the negotiation of a peace treaty
  - Negotiation of an international agreement outlawing the use of atomic bombs and hydrogen bombs. Such a treaty would have "effective control and inspection of atomic stockpiles and installations"
  - Ratification of the Geneva Protocol banning the use of chemical weapons and biological weapons in war
  - Using the United Nations as a tool to advance "progressive universal disarmament"
- Opposition to any bill mandating universal military training.
- Repealing the military draft law
- Providing "full representation in the United Nations by admitting all present applicant nations, including seating the People's Republic of China (Chinese Communist Party-led government of mainland China) in the United Nations
- Withdraw United Nations recognition of "fascist Spain" (Francoist Spain)
- Ending "trade barriers to peaceful trade between America and the Soviet Union, China, and Eastern Europe."
- "Support the demands for independence and freedom of colonial peoples all over the world."
  - Ending "support for fascist and racist regimes such as the Malan government in South Africa"
  - Ending support for, "all other imperialism which hold African and Asian peoples in colonial bondage"
  - "Support[ing] democratic movements in Latin America and reverse[ing] the present policy of support to South American dictatorships."
  - "Repeal[ing] all laws imposing restrictions on the economic and political independence of the Philippines"
  - Granting "full and immediate" Puerto Rican independence, and extending economic assistance to an independent Puerto Rico
- Granting full statehood to the territories of Alaska and Hawaii
- Holding of "a conference of the "five great powers" as "the only peaceful means for securing an over-all settlement of differences"

=== Jobs and security ===
Promising "jobs and security for all Americans", the platform called for:

- A "prompt return to a peacetime economy", which it asserted would be "the only real guarantee of economic security for the American people." The platform accused the two major parties of contrarily proposing "war and a war economy" as a means to "generate prosperity and stave off depression". The platform faulted war production with "soaring prices, crushing taxes, frozen wages, mounting unemployment, and sharply reduced living standards", and argued that "production for peace" would reverse these trends.
- Strict price controls, including price ceilings and the restoration of rent at pre-Korean War rates through federal rent control.
- Ending "wage-freeze", and a "return to free collective bargaining"
- Repealing the Taft–Hartley Act, re-enacting the Wagner Act, and preventing the passage of the "anti-labor bill" proposed by Sen. Howard W. Smith
- A national housing program that would add 2.5 million new units of low-cost rental units each year, along with public housing subsidies to sustain low rents. "Wipe out the slums and provide all Americans with decent homes, without discrimination or segregation."
- Various tax policies:
  - Creation of a tax exemption for families of four with income below $4,000 and for individuals with incomes below $2,000.
  - Creation of childcare tax deductions for working mothers
  - Increased corporate taxes
  - Closing of tax loopholes for "wealthy individuals and large corporations"
  - Preventing the creation of a federal sales tax
  - Repealing "the excise tax on necessities"
  - Tax relief for small businesses
- Welfare programs to "guarantee to all Americans without discrimination benefits equal to a minimum decent standard of living", which would specifically include:
  - Comprehensive federal welfare system for senior citizens
    - Compensation of no less than $150 monthly to senior citizens
    - Expansion of the Social Security Act to cover all workers and all self-employed individuals, including farmers
  - Unemployment and disability benefits of "no less than $40 weekly, with additional dependency allowances"
- Child benefits to families of $3 weekly per child
- Providing dependency benefits to working mothers at an amount equal to unemployment benefits
- Socialized healthcare: "System of national health insurance, guaranteeing to all Americans as a matter of right and not as charity, and without discrimination, adequate dental and medical care, together with a hospital and health center program and an expanded program of medical education and research."
- "A comprehensive farm program" which would include:
  - "Provide that the prices to be paid to farmers will be agreed upon and set well in advance of the production season"
  - Make available to farmers federal subsidies on their market place returns, so long as is necessary to achieve the aims of enabling farmers to "adopt and enjoy living standards on parity with the rest of the population" and implement programs to conserve soil and restore soil fertility.
  - "100% parity prices for all farm commodities on the basis of the revised and modernized parity formula"
  - Ceasing the drafting of farm youth into the military
  - Tax reductions for working farmers
  - Exempting agricultural cooperatives from federal income taxes
- A 10-year program of federally-financed school construction to cost approximately $10 billion.
- Immediate appropriation of $1 billion in federal aid to public schools for increasing teachers salaries, employing additional teachers, and the provision of "essential materials and services for children"
- Ending segregation and all forms of discrimination in education

=== Equal civil rights ===
The platform called for greater civil rights protections.

The platform called for:

- Protection of the civil rights of African Americans (often referred to in the platform as "Negro people", per the common parlance of the era) by ending segregation in the United States) (which the platform called "America's shame"), thereby bringing "full and equal rights for the negro people – now".
- "A federal fair employment practices law with effective enforcement powers to guarantee equality in job opportunities and training for the Negro people, Puerto Ricans, Mexican-Americans, and all other minorities."
- "A federal anti-poll tax" that would guarantee "minorities the right to register to vote in the primary and general elections for federal offices.
- Revising Standing Rules of the United States Senate in order to prohibit the filibuster.
- A federal anti-lynching law
- The "immediate issuance" of an Executive Order by the president to bring prosecutions under federal civil rights statutes.
- The "immediate issuance" of an Executive Order by the president that would prohibit federal contractors from engaging in employment discrimination
- Ending housing segregation and housing discrimination
- "Immediate issuance" of a new Executive Order to end segregation and discrimination in the United States Armed Forces, federal departments and agencies, and the Panama Canal Zone
- "Real home rule for the District of Columbia", alongside federal legislation that would place a prohibition within the District on "every form of segregation and discrimination".
- "Full representation of the Negro and Puerto Rican and Mexican-American people in Congress, in State legislatures, and all other levels of public office."
- Require that appropriations of federal money for any public purpose must require a specific provision prohibiting the funds from being used in a manner discriminatory towards minorities.
- Full citizenship for American Indians (Native Americans in the United States), and granting to them the "right to administer their own affairs without loss of Reservation rights" as well as "adequate compensation for loss of tribal land rights."

=== Restoration of First Amendment freedoms ===
The platform pledged to "restore freedom to all Americans" and to restore the Bill of Rights for all Americans", On this note, the platform included calls for:

- Protecting of labor rights
- Repealing of the Taft–Hartley Act, Smith Act, and McCarran Internal Security Act
- Defeating McCarthyism and "McCarrenism"

== List of significant speakers ==
=== July 4 ===
After hearings on the party platform, the convention's first evening included speeches by several notable individuals.

- Welcoming address:
  - Elmer A. Benson, national party co-chairman and former governor of Minnesota
  - Robert Morss Lovett, Illinois state party chairman
- Paul Robeson, musician and national co-chairman of party
- W. E. B. Du Bois, activist, sociologist, and former diplomat (keynote address)

=== July 5 ===
- Vivian Hallinan, wife of presidential nominee (acceptance speech on husband's behalf)
- Charlotta Bass, vice presidential nominee (acceptance speech)

== Summary of major speeches ==
=== Presidential acceptance speech ===
Unusual circumstances of the nominee being unable to deliver an acceptance speech resulted in the acceptance read on his behalf also being an instance of a speech by a spouse of a nominee at a United States presidential nominating convention. At the time, Hallinan was serving a six-month jail term at McNeil Island Federal Penitentiary for a charge of contempt of court that was related to his defense of labor leader Harry Bridges two years prior. His sentence was not scheduled to end until August 18, rendering him unable to attend the convention. In his stead, his wife, Vivian, delivered his acceptance speech. In her speech, she said that she was confident that her if her husband had been present to speak himself he would have wanted to center his remarks solely on highlighting the "fight for peace" Vivian Hallinan spoke,

The two old parties are afraid of peace. Why? We all have seen those scare headlines: "peace scare drives stock prices down."...If the American people should really demand a peace in Korea, the two parties have seen to it that we shall have a peace in Europe...The madmen in Washington have been so corrupt, so dishonorable that in the same week they have promised West Germany that if she rearms she will se all of Germany reunited,–while at the same time they have told France that they need not fear the rearmament of West German because she will see that Germany is never reunited.

=== Vice presidential acceptance speech ===
In a portion of her vice presidential nomination acceptance speech, Bass remarked,

I have fought not only for my people. I have fought and will continue to fight unceasingly for the rights and privileges of all people who are oppressed and who are denied their just share of the world’s goods their labor produces. I have walked and will continue to walk in picket lines for the right of all men and women, of all races, to organize for their own protection and advancement. I will continue to cry out against police brutality against any people, as I did in the infamous Zoot Suit Riots in Los Angeles in 1944, when I went into dark alleys and reached scared and badly beaten Negro and Mexican American boys, some of them children, from the clubs and knives of city police. Nor have I hesitated in the face of that most un-American Un-American Activities Committee — and I am willing to face it again. And so help me God, I shall continue to tell the truth as I know it and believe it as a progressive citizen and a good American.

Bass rhetorically asked the convention crowd,

Can you imagine the [Republican] party of [Robert] Taft and [Dwight] Eisenhower and [Douglas] MacArthur calling upon a Negro woman to lead a struggle against high taxes and high prices and frozen wages? Can you conceive the [Democratic] party of [Harry] Truman, of [Richard] Russell of Georgia, of [John E.] Rankin of Mississippi, placing in nomination a Negro woman like myself to carry on a battle for fair practices in employment, against segregation, and for full equality?

=== Keynote address by W. E. B. Du Bois ===
The convention's keynote address was delivered by W. E. B. Du Bois. His speech was delivered after the conclusion of public hearings on the party's platform. Du Bois, who had previously supported Wallace's campaign as the 1948 Progressive presidential nominee, again supported the party's presidential ticket. His keynote endorsed the party's nominees, outlined the party's platform, and touched on a number of political issues. His speech was introduced by the party's national secretary, Calvin Benham Baldwin.

Du Bois's speech criticized the "two old parties" (the Democrats and Republicans) as both being dedicated to continuing Cold War hostilities with the Soviet Union, arguing that the Progressive Party held the necessary role in ending these tensions. He voiced his view that the United States was being "rushed into war", and argued that war in the atomic age would be "the supreme, disaster–there is nothing worse". Du Bois argued in favor of obtaining peace by ending the Korean War, extending an offer of friendship to the Soviet Union and the People's Republic of China (the communist government in Mainland China). The speech also talked about socialism, America's use of propaganda, and colonial imperialism. The speech also touched on the subject of Black political representation.

=== Address by Vito Marcantonio ===
In his address, Convention Chair Vito Marcantonio remarked,

With belief in our fathers, and faith in our people, we here at this Convention constitute the people's opposition to the juggernaut of war, oppression and reaction, and we today, the political lineal descendants of the Free Soilers of over 100 years ago, raise our banner on which are inscribed the words: "free speech and free and equal men living in a world of peace." I say we are not wasting time; we are not fighting in vain. For as we battle in 1952, to that extent will we earn the right to be the hard core of the great political party that will follow in the realignment which will inexorably ensue from the disintegration of the Democratic Party.

== Panels ==
The convention featured panels dedicated to various subjects, including:

- Farmers Panel
- Negro and Minority Representation Panel: co-chaired by Willard Ransom (Indiana NAACP leader) and Mary Natividad Barnes of California; also featuring Horace V. Alexander (congressional candidate from California) and Louis Wheaton (convention delegate from New York)
- Women's Panel
- Youth and veterans: held on July 4, led by Don Rothenberg (executive secretary of the Ohio Progressive Party)

== Media coverage ==
The party pushed the FCC to order radio and television networks to grant and facilitate airtime of its nominees' acceptance speeches, taking advantage of the equal-time rule. While the networks granted the convention broadcast time during its convention, a spokesperson for the networks also clarified that the FCC had only directed them to give equal time to candidates and not party organizations. Besides the equal-time rule mandated coverage, the press generally gave little notice to the convention. This was in contrast to the gavel-to-gavel coverage that networks afforded the two major party conventions.

Preceded by 1950	Progressive National Conventions	Succeeded by N/A
