= 1950 Progressive National Convention =

American political event

- 1950 United States elections
- Ashland Boulevard Auditorium (convention venue), photographed in 1920

Convention
- Dates: February 24–25, 1950
- City: Chicago, Illinois
- Venue: Ashland Boulevard Auditorium
- Keynote speaker: Henry A. Wallace
- Total delegates: 1,200

The 1950 Progressive National Convention was held in February 2425, 1950 at the Ashland Boulevard Auditorium in Chicago, Illinois. The party was a midterm-year national meeting of the Progressive Party, a short-lived minor American political party that had been founded in 1948.

The convention was held during the year of a midterm, and was not a presidential nominating convention.

== Logistics ==
The convention (the second national convention in the party's history) took place February 24–26, 1950, at the Ashland Boulevard Auditorium, which was located in Chicago, Illinois, at 1604 Van Buren Street. The same venue would later host the party's 1952 presidential nominating convention.

The New York Times reported that the convention featured 1,200 delegates representing 35 states. The Associated Press, in some stories, reported that the convention featured 1,100 delegates from 33 states; while in others they estimated the same figures given by the New York Times.

At the convention, the party was aiming to position itself to perform well in the congressional elections of 1950, a midterm election. The delegates were, at the start of the convention, given instructions by party leadership on how to position the party for success in the elections. Party founder Henry A. Wallace gave some instructions in his February 24 keynote address. The following day, further advice was given by O. John Rogge in his speech, and much additional instruction was delivered by a third-party election strategy group that delivered its advice to the convention. It was urged that delegates should work to elect Progressive nominees in winnable districts, and to elect the most-aligned Democratic or Republican nominee in any districts that the Progressive Party would be unable to itself win.It was also urged that delegates open the party to non-communist progressives not already in its ranks, and to "give us the respectability they say we lack and need." It was also advised that delegates to offer criticisms of the Soviet Union when delegates viewed Soviet actions to warrant criticism, and to similarly defend it when delegates viewed Soviet actions as rightful.

During the convention, the party avoided an immediate public-facing split between its left and right wings.

== Party platform, resolutions ==
=== Schism over Soviet plank ===
Heading into the convention, the party had long faced outside criticisms that characterized it as being either directly adherent to the positions of the Communist Party of the Soviet Union or otherwise closely-aligned with its positions.

Following two hours of debate, the convention adopted a plank that was only mildly critical of the Soviet regime, and which stated that the Progressives did not consider themselves to be Soviet apologists. The fight was, in part, played out before the partty's platform committee, which was chaired by W. E. B. Du Bois.

A faction headed by party founder Henry Wallace had sought to have the party adopt a foreign party plank denouncing dictatorships and imperialistic ventures, including those by Stalin. Wallace made known his dissatisfaction with the plank only being a tepid rejection of Soviet affiliation. He argued that the party needed to be as forceful as it could in distancing itself from Soviet Communism in order to overcome negative public perceptions. Rogge, a Wallace ally who was the other major spokesman of the Wallace faction, similarly urged the convention to distance the party from the Soviet Union. Wallace left convention before its conclusion, with speculation circulating that he would be leaving the party altogether (which he ultimately did).

The second major faction of the party, led by Congressman Vito Marcantonio, sought to exclude any language criticizing the Soviets and their satellite nations. Others in this camp included labor organizers Lee Pressman, Nathan Wit, and John Abt.

A third faction was those who sought to bridge peace between the other factions. This faction was led by the party's national chairman, Elmer A. Benson (former governor of Minnesota and former U.S. senator) and by its national secretary Calvin Benham Baldwin.

=== Resolution praising Israel ===
The Progressive platform included a plank which offered complete praise for the state of Israel and its then-current government. The plank praised the Israeli government for its democratic character. This plank was adopted after a heated floor-fight between opposing camps on the issue, in which the pro-Israel side prevailed.

Support for the Israeli government was a positions in the Progressive plank that explicitly contradicted with the Soviet government's position on international affairs. At the time, many world communist had been critical of Israel, as had many American communists.

=== Plank on farms ===
The convention adopted a farm plank primarily authored by Fred Stover of Iowa, which demanded that the Brannan plan for maintaining farm income be adopted by the Truman administration. The plank also included language aimed against the Farm Bureau's position on transitioning low-producing farmers to other sectors of employment, condemning farm leaders who, "cold-bloodedly advocate a program of eliminating from one-half to two-thirds of our farmers". The plank additionally urged income protection payments to family farms, declaring, "we again endorse the principle of direct payment to family farmers not only for soil conservation practices and crop adjustments, but for pull parity income protection."

The plank further urged for, "a domestic program of full production and full employment at good wages and a world food program that provides adequate diet for all people of the world". The plank gave support to farmer and consumer co-operatives as a measure "against the tax drive staged by business groups".

== Party leadership election ==
A party leadership vote was held at the convention. This included the "big three" party leadership roles of chairman and co-chairmen.

Elmer A. Benson (former Minnesota governor) was re-elected as the national chairman of the party. Paul Robeson of New York was re-elected as one of the party's two national co-chairmen. Fred Stover of Iowa was selected to succeed Albert Fitzgerald as the other of the party's two national co-chairmen. Stover had opted to step-down to focus on his role as head of the United Electrical Workers union.

The convention re-elected Elinor S. Gimbel of New York and Hugh Bryson of California as party vice-chairs, and newly elected Christene Walker of Michigan and Senora Lawson as vice chairs. It also re-elected Calvin Benham Baldwin as national party secretary, and newly elected Corliss Lamont as national party treasurer.

== Notable speeches ==
Charles P. Howard, who had been the 1948 convention's keynote speaker, delivered a speech on the fight for African American representation in the United States Congress.

Vito Marcantonio, the party's only incumbent congressman, spoke to the convention as head of its congressional campaign committee. Paul Robeson and his wife both spoke at the convention, and Robeson also sung at a concert held as part of the convention.

=== O. John Rogge (former U.S. assistant attorney general) ===
O. John Rogge (former United States assistant attorney general, and a major figure in the party's leadership) delivered a speech to the convention. In his remarks, he spoke against Eastern Bloc hostilities towards Yugoslavia. He urged the party's members not to contort their values to justify such conduct, remarking "we shall not bend reason in order to attempt to justify the conduct of the Cominform countries towards Yogoslavia." Per news reporting, this line was disagreeably met with a "dead silence on the convention floor".

Rogge urged the party to disavow Communists and the Soviet Union, and to offer active criticisms of wrongdoings by the Soviet Union. He exclaimed, "we must make it clear that we are not the tail to any foreign kite". This was reportedly met with a muted response from delegates. Met more favorably was his declaration that Progressives should back the Soviet Union "when she is right".

Rogge denied accusations that Communists dominated their party, and urged the party to ignore "Red-baiting", declaring, "we must say to all those who place human rights first, whatever their party, x x x come over and make us respectable...You say we are communist led, we deny the charge. But in any event, come on over." Urging for non-communist progressives to join and assert their control over the party, he continued, "come on over, you non-communist progressives, and take charge of your Progressive Party."

==== Response statement by Americans for Democratic Action ====
In his call for non-communist progressives to join with the party, Rogge specifically called for Americans for Democratic Action (ADA) to join forces with the party. The ADA quickly issued a statement publicly declining this invitation,

No one would be fooled by the obvious whitewash attempts.
The Wallace movement is still dominated by the same Communist Party liners who have had control of it since its birth.
All Democratic liberals are aware that this is just a renewed attempt of the Communists to form a phony united front.

=== Keynote address by Henry A. Wallace (party's 1948 presidential nominee, former U.S. vice president) ===
Wallace delivered the keynote address on Friday February 24, early into the convention and before the platform votes. In his speech, he argued that the party stood not for communism but for progressive capitalism He characterized this as being greatly different from communism, leninism, marxism, and socialism. This view of the party's ideology, however, was not reflected by the platform adopted by the party in the days that followed.

In his speech, Wallace declared that it had been a mistake two years earlier for the party not to adopt a plank clarifying that it did not endorse Soviet foreign policy. In his speech, he offered criticisms of foreign policy actions by the Soviet Union. These criticisms were reportedly met with muted reaction by the convention's audience. By comparison, during the convention, crowds gave enthusiastic applause to criticisms of United States foreign policy and remarks of general opposition to the Cold War.

Overall, Wallace played a minimal role in the remainder of the convention during the following two days, only attending a single session before departing Chicago to attend to a private matter in Des Moines, Iowa.

Preceded by 1948	Progressive National Conventions	Succeeded by 1952
