= Television broadcasts of the 1952 Democratic and Republican National Conventions =

Coverage of American political events

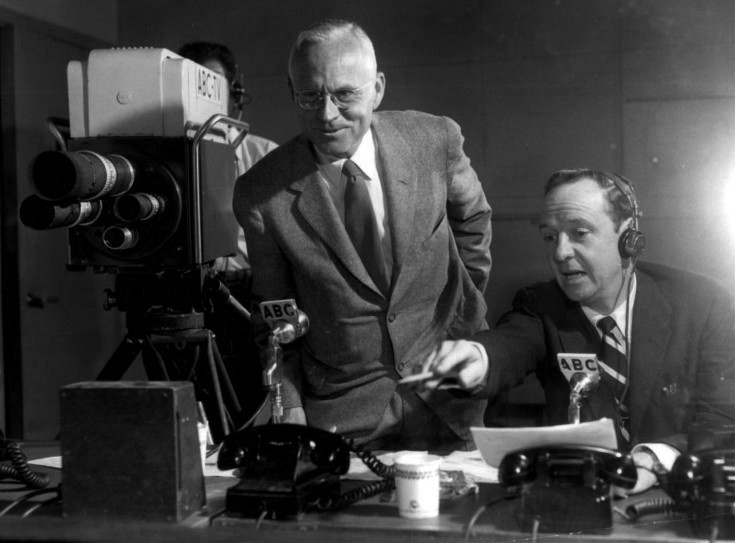
Quincy Howe and John Daly commentating for ABC's convention coverage

The two major party presidential nominating conventions of the 1952 United States presidential election (the Democratic National Convention and the Republican National Convention) marked the first instance in which television networks broadcast live convention coverage across the continental United States. Accommodating and adapting to the advent of television coverage was a major consideration in the logistics of the two conventions, which were each held at the International Amphitheatre in Chicago during different weeks of July 1952 (Republicans convening July 7–11; Democrats convening July 21–26). Live convention coverage was nationally broadcast by each of the "Big Four" American terrestrial television networks at the time: ABC, CBS, DuMont, and NBC.

The introduction of the live television lens to their conventions motivated each party to make image-conscious adjustments to their convention staging. The Democrats, being second to hold their conventions made last-minute adjustments to their convention staging in order to improve upon shortfalls of the Republican Convention in regards to television presentation.

The broadcasts required a significant telecommunications infrastructure to be installed across Chicago.

== Background ==
The conventions were the first political conventions to be televised live, coast-to-coast. Previously, since 1924, the primary means which Americans received gavel-to-gavel rolling coverage of presidential nominating conventions had been broadcast radio.

Precursor experiments in broadcasting of conventions had occurred in earlier years, but 1952 was the first year in which networks carried nationwide coverage of political conventions. In the previous election (1948), regional television broadcasts had been trialed at the parties' conventions (both held in Philadelphia that year). Even earlier, experimental local television broadcasting of conventions was conducted during the parties' 1940 conventions. At the time of the 1948 conventions, only eighteen cities in the United States had television stations, and only nine of them were along the coaxial cable used to relay the broadcast feed between markets. Additionally, few households had televisions on which to watch the 1948 broadcasts.

As the two previous instances in which television broadcasts had been attempted only reached limited markets, 1952 was the first time many media markets had broadcast any live television coverage of presidential conventions. Examples of significant media markets that, in 1952, saw their very first convention television broadcasts include Dallas-Fort Worth, Miami, New Orleans, Oklahoma City, Phoenix, San Antonio, Seattle, Tulsa, and Lansing. Further, the number of television stations in the United States had greatly expanded in 1952, after a multi year Federal Communications Commission (FCC) freeze on new stations was lifted in April.

== Logistics ==
Ahead of the convention, predictions were that 60 million viewers would watch the television broadcasts. After the conventions, the networks estimated that 65 million viewers had watched the convention, at a time when the United States had a population of just over 150 million. Networks aired "gavel to gavel" coverage, airing the entirety of general sessions. This resulted in the four networks each airing a combined 57.5 hours of convention coverage over the course the Republican convention and 61.1 hours of convention coverage during the Democratic convention. It was estimated that the average household tuned into between 10 and 13 hours of convention broadcasts.

Convention planners were anticipated to schedule more-important events during the evening so that a larger television audience would be viewing live coverage.

Television and radio broadcasters were anticipated to send approximately 1,000 personnel to the conventions. National televised coverage was carried by the Big Four American terrestrial television networks at the time: ABC, CBS, DuMont, and NBC. The cost for the networks to facilitate these broadcasts was anticipated to be in excess $5 million. DuMont set-up the "nerve center" controls for television networks to utilize during the conventions. Networks planned to have their television staff for the convention 18-hours of each day, so that they would be able to produce breaking news reports when warranted. An official from DuMont declared, ahead of the convention, that the network envisioned broadcasts to be a, "presentation of [political] personalities on a live basis, rather than as seen through the eyes of a [news] writer."

Network television coverage was broadcast on 107 television stations in 65 different cities (media markets) across the United States. In its corporate magazine, Bell Telephone, which was heavily involved in broadcasting logistics, reported that the stations broadcasting network convention coverage were available to 99% of television sets in the United States. Bell reported that its long lines division accelerated the completion of an additional 5,000 miles (8,000 km) of microwave and coaxial cable channels in time for the convention broadcasts, which expanded its long lines network 30,000 miles (48,000 km).

Bell Telephone's magazine wrote, of the logistics in Chicago to facilitate the broadcasts, "along with the television facilities already in place, the largest concentration of facilities ever amassed at one point were installed to handle the conventions." Historian Florencia Pierri observed in 2020,

The 1952 presidential conventions were particularly important moments in the history of television technology...[The conventions featured] the most complex array of television and radio facilities ever assembled. It was the first time the convention would be televised in color and in real time from coast to coast. [NBC's coverage] took 6 weeks of planning, 2 million dollars' worth of equipment, and a 300-person staff, all supplied with the latest equipment.

Microwave antenna dishes installed atop the International Amphitheatre to facilitate television broadcasts

Television "nerve center" inside of the International Amphitheatre

Bell Telephone installer setting up a broadcast company's control room at the International Amphitheatre

During the planning stage, the main venue for the conventions was moved from the Chicago Stadium arena (where the most recent previous presidential nominating conventions in Chicago had been staged) to the International Amphitheatre upon the judgement of party leaders that the latter was a better-suited venue for television broadcasts. Television studios were erected inside of the convention halls of the International Amphitheatre complex. To facilitate broadcasts of floor proceedings, eight cable-based video communication channels and twelve microwave antenna-based video communication channels were installed at the arena. To establish these antenna communications channels, satellite dishes were installed on the of the International Amphitheatre.

The exhibition hall at the Conrad Hilton (the headquarters hotel for both conventions, today known as the "Hilton Chicago") was used as a media operation headquarters by major television and radio networks, as well as the printed press. The setup required an extensive number of cables for telephone lines, as well as an extensive amount of equipment such as teletype printers. The Democratic National lasted longer than the hotel's management had anticipated, and they began to oust the press from this space on the morning of July 26, as it had been reserved for a July 27 jewelry convention. This resulted in the media that had been working out of this space moving into the press room at the International Amphitheatre for the remainder of the convention. Accommodations were also made to allow the networks to broadcast live coverage from the headquarters hotel.

A total of 24 video communication channels (of both cable and antenna varieties) in Chicago were established for use by the networks in their convention coverage. In tandem with video pickup locations installed at a vast array of sites in Chicago, this granted the networks flexibility in broadcasting live coverage of activities occurring both inside and outside of the core venues of the conventions. Among the locations where video pickups were installed the Chicago & North Western Railroad Terminal; Midway Airport, and the elephant house at Brookfield Zoo. The Midway Airport pickup allowed the networks to broadcast the arrival of incumbent president Harry S. Truman to the Democratic Convention by airplane.

Bell Network's magazine revealed that the demands posed by the broadcasts presented a need for quick improvisation. An example given was getting permission from the Western Union Telegraph Company to use one of Western Union's existing underground cable conduits to route an improvised connection to the Conrad Hilton Hotel's communications channels so that the networks would be able to broadcast at the Blackstone Hotel after Dwight D. Eisenhower had secured the Republican nomination. As it became clear that Eisenhower was on the path to secure the nomination, the networks began requesting the use of lines to broadcast at the Blackstone, as Eisenhower was staying at the Blackstone and ultimately celebrated his victory with a rally in the streets outside of it. However, the Blackstone had only a single pickup. This would have been insufficient for all of the networks to broadcast on simultaneously, thus requiring a connection to be run to the communication channels at the adjacent Conrad Hilton. However city ordinances would not have permitted Bell Telephone to run an overhead line, which required them to find an existing underground conduit that could carry such an improvised connection.

During the Democratic convention, DuMont had its public affairs program Keep Posted film in Chicago instead of its normal broadcast studio.

== Broadcasts of floor proceedings ==
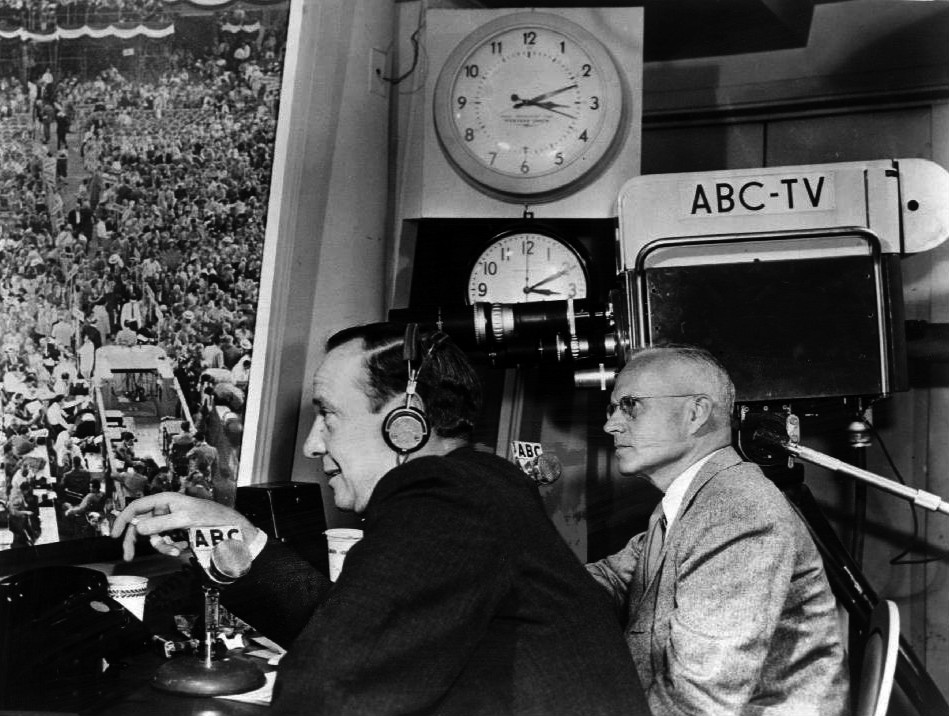
Quincy Howe and John Daly commentating for ABC's convention coverage

With the presence of television cameras and broad anticipated viewership, advance concern was given by convention organizers to the appearance of delegates when captured on camera. To assure their best appearance on television cameras of the era, experts recommended that male delegates wear grey or tan suits paired with shirts of either a green, blue, or pink color. They recommended against suits that had too sharp of a contrast of color (such as black suits with white shirts), and also recommended against striped seersucker suits. It was also advised that haircuts be had one week in advance of the convention, with experts cautioning that fresh haircuts often made hair parts look excessively sharp on camera. Due to concern of glare, advice was given against wearing jewelry. It was advised that any jewelry that was worn be coated with a layer of soft soap to decrease glare. TV makeup experts also recommended for bald delegates apply pancake makeup to their bald spots in order to prevent glare (from overhead lights) that would otherwise be captured by cameras. Accordingly, during the Democratic convention, U.S. House Speaker and convention chairman Sam Rayburn applied makeup to decrease the glare from lights reflecting off his bald head. CBS Television News reported at the start of the Republican convention that many makeup artists were employed for the convention at both the International Amphitheater convention hall and the Conrad Hilton (the convention headquarters hotel), busy working, "to add hair, remove beards, fill out too-thin faces, blot out too-evident jowels, and in general make their contribution to television's 'magic'".

Making its commercial debut at the conventions was the so-called "Walkie-Lookie", a newly-developed early portable television camera developed by the Radio Corporation of America (led by chairman David Sarnoff). This allowed for closeup views to be broadcast of delegates and politicians on the convention floor.

The Republican convention saw criticism of the habit of many politicians of posing for photographers directly in front of the stage while another person was delivering a speech on the stage.

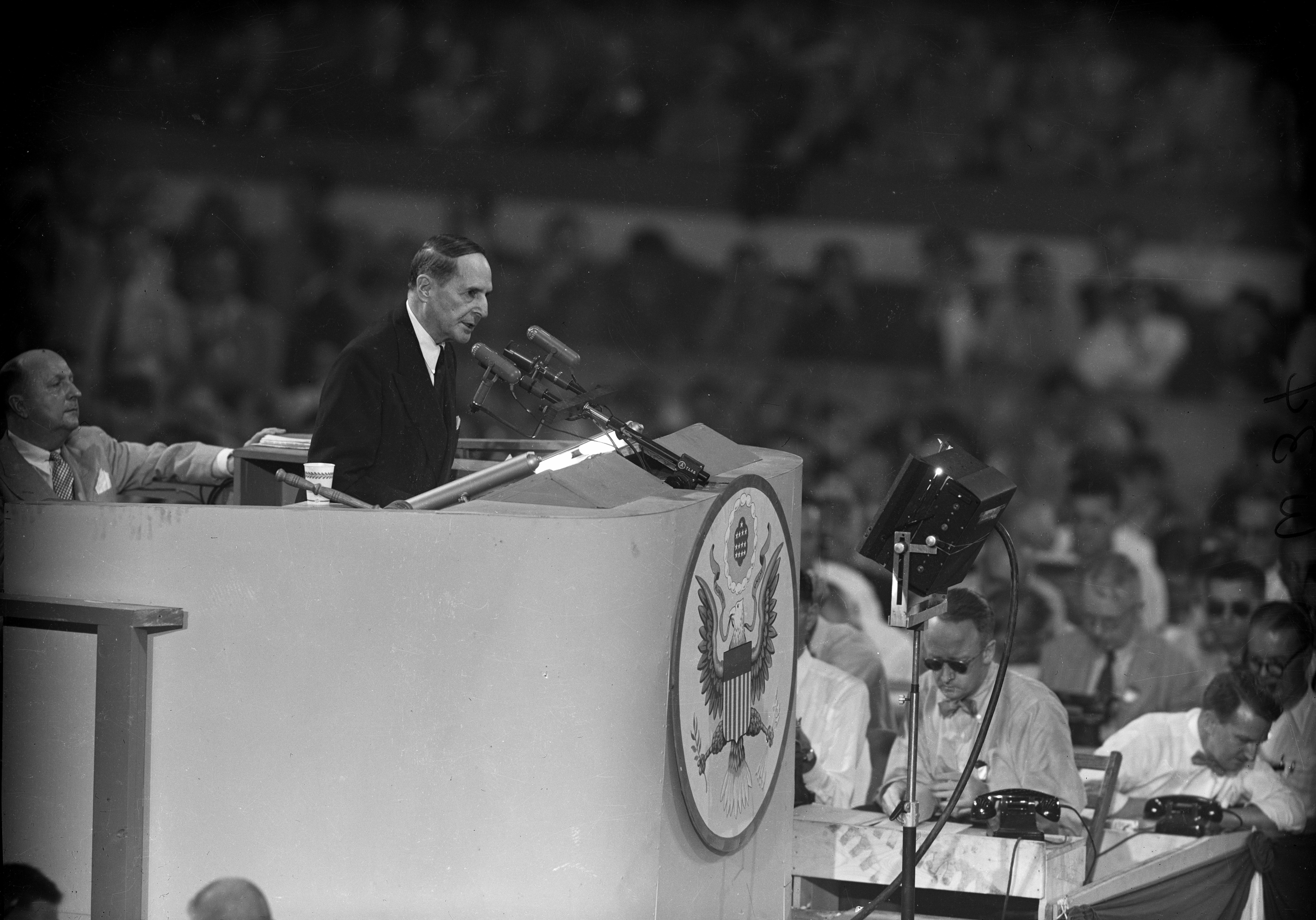
Douglas MacArthur reading off of a non-concealed teleprompter during his keynote address to the Republican convention. Democrats noted these optics, and introduced a concealed teleprompter for their convention

The impact of the Republican Convention broadcast was an immediate one. After carefully watching the Republican Convention, the Democratic Party made last-minute alterations to their convention held in the same venue to make their broadcast more appealing to television audiences. They constructed a tower in the center of the convention hall to allow for a better shot of the podium, and Democrats exercised more control over camera shots and the conduct of delegates in front of the cameras. While Republican speakers had used a teleprompter that was often visible to television audiences, Democratic speakers were given a teleprompter that was hidden into their lectern. Ahead of the start of their convention, Democrats promised that (based on lessons learned from observing the Republican convention) they would start all sessions within fifteen minutes of their scheduled opening times, and grant a television camera to be set up in a position that would allow a head-on view of the speaker's platform (which was not available to broadcasters during the Republican convention).

On the first day of the Democratic convention, organizers placed slips of paper on the seats of all delegates cautioning then, "You will be on television. 140,000,000 eyes will watch you. Remember –you may not know it– Television may be showing a close-up picture of you!"

At the subsequent 1956 conventions, the medium of television would further affect both party's conventions. Conventions would be compacted in length that year, with daytime sessions being largely eliminated and the amount of welcoming speeches and parliamentary organization speeches being decreased (such as seconding speeches for vice-presidential candidates, which were eliminated). Additionally, beginning that year conventions were given overlying campaign themes, and their sessions were scheduled in order to maximize exposure to prime-time audience. To provide a more telegenic broadcast, convention halls were decked out in banners and other decorations, and television cameras were positioned at more flattering angles.

== Broadcasts of committee hearings ==
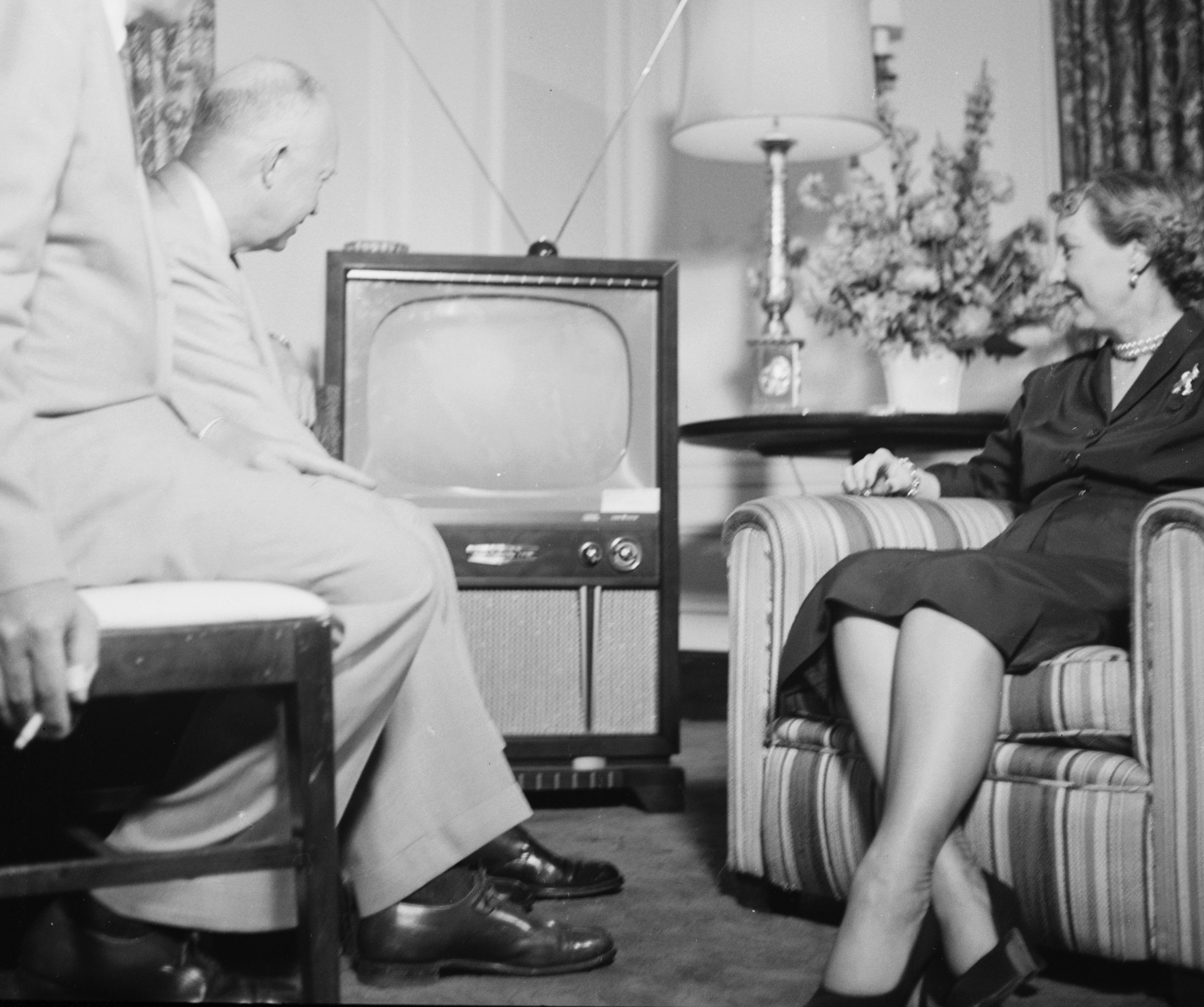
Dwight D. Eisenhower and his wife Mamie watching a television during the Republican convention

The Republican Party received criticism for its initial refusal to allow for the hearings before the credentials subcommittee to be televised. Relenting to pressure, the party reneged on this refusal, with the committee voting on July 8 to allow the televising of its hearings and deliberations, That day, for the first time in history, television cameras captured the hearings of a presidential convention's credential committee. The committee also voted to hold its deliberations in open session, rather than the traditional closed-session. The Associated Press heralded the televising of these deliberations as bringing much greater transparency to a previously closed-off process.

Believing that it would be to his best benefit, Democratic candidate Estes Kefauver called for the Democratic party to allow full television and radio coverage of both the convention floor action and other important party meetings. On the eve of the Democratic convention’s own credentials subcommittee hearings (scheduled to be held July 17), Democratic National Committee Chairman Frank E. McKinney announced that the Democratic party would allow full press, radio, and television coverage of its convention credentials hearings. The Democratic Party also made the hearings of its platform committee open to the media (including television and radio). These were of interest to the public, in part because of the anticipated deliberation on a civil rights plank.

== Equal-time rule ==
Prior to the conventions, the FCC ruled that the equal-time rule obligated networks to allocate equal time between coverage of candidates, but not equal time between parties themselves. This meant the networks were pressured into airing candidate presentations of the third-party Progressive National Convention (also held in Chicago in July), but not the entirety of its proceedings.

On July 5 (in the lead-up to the Republican convention), Estes Kefauver (a declared candidate for the Democratic nomination) stopped by the Conrad Hilton in order to take advantage of the equal-time rule, as television networks that had a presence at the hotel had previously promised Kefauver matching time for coverage that they had given to an event that Eisenhower (as a declared Republican candidate) had held. Kefauver fit this visit into a midwest campaign tour.

== Analysis ==
Minnesota Governor C. Elmer Anderson, a Republican, opined at the time that television coverage had increased public interest in the conventions. Some news outlets called into question the extent of public interest, however. On the first day of the Republican convention, Madison, Wisconsin, newspaper The Capital Times sent its reporters to taverns and bars near the Wisconsin State Capitol on the first day of the convention to survey whether area bars had their televisions showing the convention broadcasts. None of the establishments visited by reporters had their televisions turned on to show the coverage.

Contemporary newspaper coverage included speculation about whether the scrutiny of the television lens at the conventions would pressure convention participants to genuinely comport themselves more politely and above-board, or whether it would merely push more impolite and rowdy shenanigans off of the convention floor and into so-called "smoke-filled rooms", where such behavior could continue out of public sight.

A major impact the broadcasts had on the television landscape was catapulting newsman Walter Cronkite to prominence. Cronkite, a reporter at the fledgling television CBS News division, anchored commentary for the network during both conventions. This proved to be the breakthrough moment in his television career, providing a launchpad for his influential career as a news anchor.

== See also ==
- 1952 in television
