= Samuel Kennard =

Samuel M. Kennard
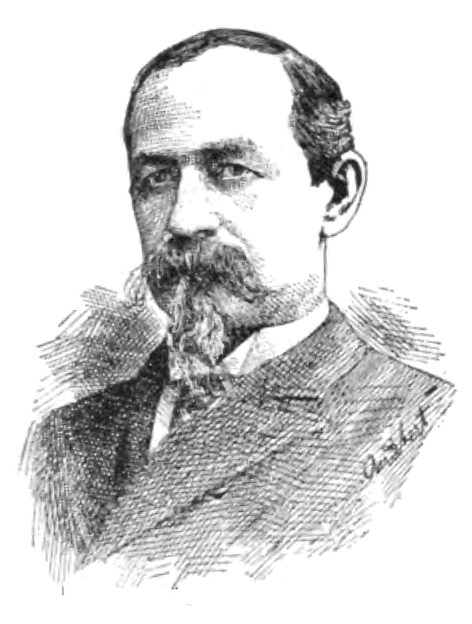
- Born: Samuel Mummey Kennard; January 11, 1842; Lexington, Kentucky
- Died: December 7, 1916 (aged 74); St. Louis, Missouri
- Occupation: Businessman

Samuel Mummey Kennard (1842–1916) was a St. Louis, Missouri, businessman and Confederate Army officer. He was active in civic affairs and had an elementary school named after him.

== Early life ==
Kennard was born in Lexington, Kentucky, on January 11, 1842, the son of John Kennard and Rebecca Owings.

He was educated in Lexington schools and moved to St. Louis at the age of 15 with his father, who established a carpet business.

== Civil War ==
When the war broke out, Kennard joined the Confederate Army and became a member of the Landis' Missouri Battery, attached to Cockrell's Brigade. He saw active service in the Siege of Vicksburg before 1863, then became a prisoner of war. He was exchanged and became a lieutenant in Henry Guibor's Battery, of which he commanded a section during the battle of Franklin, Tennessee, on October 30, 1864.

During the last six months of the war, he was with the army of General John Bell Hood in Georgia and Tennessee. For part of that time, he was aide-de-camp to Nathan B. Forrest.

== Postwar ==
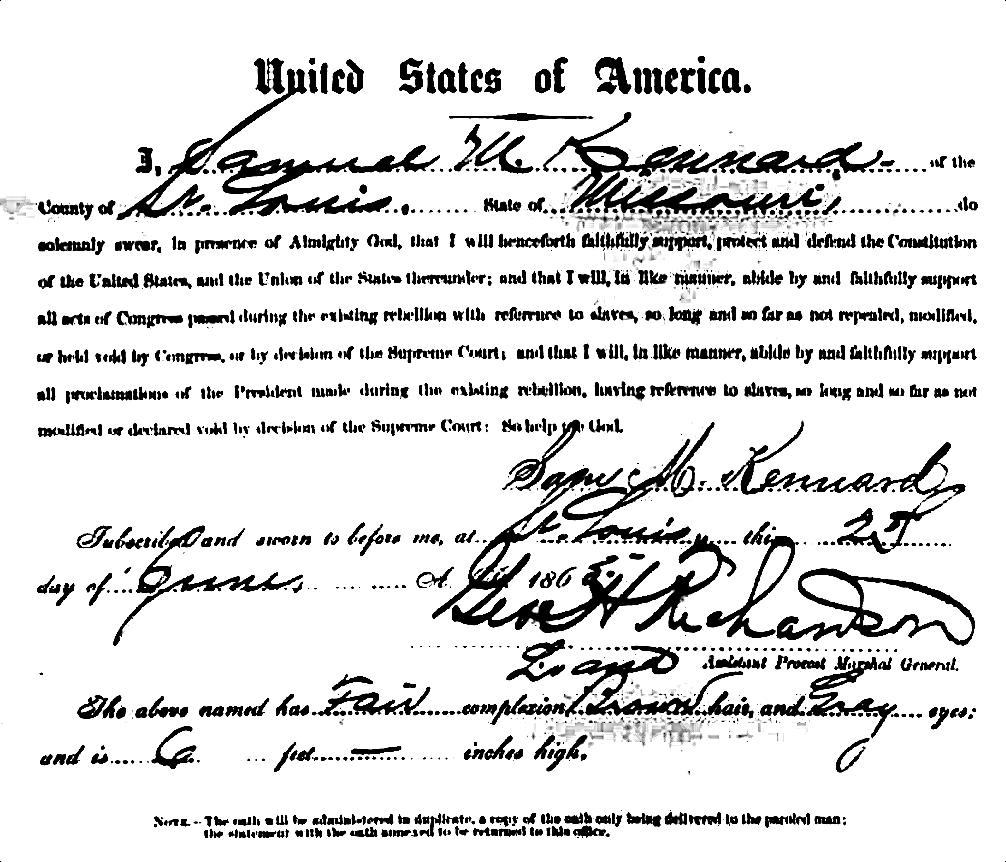
Oath to defend the Constitution of the United States and, among other promises, to "abide by and faithfully support all acts of Congress passed during the . . . rebellion having reference to slaves . . . ," signed by Samuel M. Kennard on June 27, 1865

At war's end, he returned to St. Louis to become a partner in his father's business. After the elder Kennard's death in 1872, the firm was incorporated under the name J. Kennard & Sons Carpet Company.

Kennard was an organizer of the Saint Louis Exposition and for twelve years was on its board of directors. He also was president of the first meeting of the St. Louis Autumnal Festival Association and vice president of the Louisiana Purchase Exposition Company, which promoted the St. Louis World's Fair.

Kennard was a grand treasurer of the Missouri Masonic Order and the first president of the Mercantile Club and the St. Louis Business Men's League. He was a director of the National Bank of Commerce and the Commonwealth Trust Company.

He was one of the organizers of the Planters Hotel Company and the leader in the building of a special hall in which the Republican Party held its 1896 Republican National Convention.

A newspaper obituary said of him:

One of his most striking accomplishments, beyond his business, was with the cooperation of Smith B. Galt and Richard S. Scruggs in developing the Barnes Hospital endowment so greatly that the present Barnes Hospital, one of the finest in the world, was made possible.

== Death ==
Kennard died of uremia at the age of 74 in his home at 4 Portland Place which he had built around 1891.

He was survived by his wife and six children, John B., Samuel M. Jr., R.S., Mrs. Luther Ely Smith, Mrs. J.H. Brookmire, and Mrs. Harry Brookings Wallace.

== Legacy ==
=== Bequests ===
An active member of St. John's Methodist Episcopal Church, upon his death Kennard left gifts to the St. Louis Provident Association, St. Louis Widows' Home, Home of the Friendless, Methodist Orphans' Home, St. Vincent de Paul Society, Jewish Charitable and Educational Union, Kingdom House, and Barnes Hospital. He also left money to Jewish Associated Charities, the first bequest it had ever received from a non-Jew, according to the St. Louis Jewish Voice newspaper.

=== Elementary school ===
A new city school campus at 5032 Potomac Street was named in his honor and dedicated on the evening of January 22, 1930, before an audience of some six hundred people. It replaced an older portable structure at Kingshighway and Arsenal Street, also named for him. The new school had 18 classrooms and a kindergarten.

A portrait of Kennard, painted by local artist Albert Meyer, was given to the school by his six children and unveiled by one of his grandchildren on April 17, 1931. It was said that the family had "generously given handsome volumes and sets to the school library."

The campus in 1990 became a "high-performing magnet school for gifted children". On March 16, 2023, the school was rededicated as Betty Wheeler Classical Junior Academy, in honor of the founder of Metro Academic and Classical High School, whose educational vision impacted thousands in the St. Louis community and beyond.
