= Henry Wallace =

Henry or Harry Wallace may refer to:

- Henry A. Wallace (1888–1965), U.S. vice president 1941–1945, presidential candidate for the Progressive Party 1948
- Henry A. Wallace Beltsville Agricultural Research Center
- Henry Cantwell Wallace (1866–1924), U.S. secretary of agriculture, father of Henry A. Wallace
- Henry Louis Wallace (born 1965), American serial killer
- Henry Wallace (American football) (born 1938), American football player
- Henry W. Wallace, inventor of the kinemassic field generator, an alleged anti-gravity device
- Harry Wallace (politician) (1885–1973), British politician
- Harry Brookings Wallace, former chancellor of Washington University in St. Louis
- Harry Wallace (rugby league) (died 1917), English rugby league footballer
