= St. Louis Autumnal Festival Association =

The St. Louis Autumnal Festival Association was an organization that raised funds in St. Louis, Missouri, to sponsor and promote special observances that would bring visitors to that city in the 1890s.

== Background ==
The idea for the group was manifested in winter 1890-91 when many cities put themselves forward as a site for a proposed World's Columbian Exposition to celebrate the 400th anniversary of Christopher Columbus' arrival in the New World.

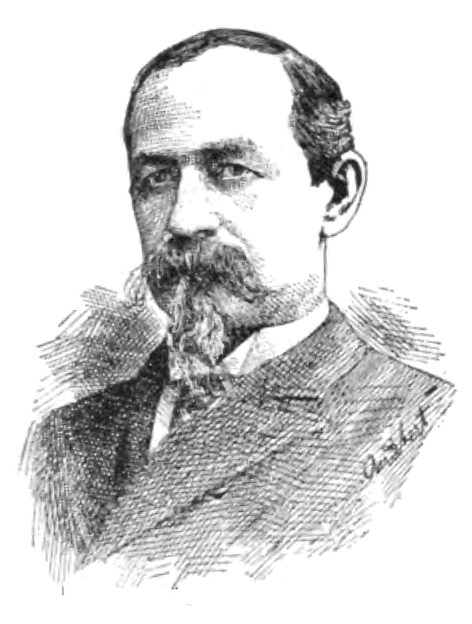
Samuel M. Kennard

The location of the fair was decided through several rounds of voting by the United States House of Representatives. The first ballot showed Chicago with a large lead over New York City, St. Louis, and Washington, D.C., but short of a majority. Chicago broke the 154-vote majority threshold on the eighth ballot, receiving 157 votes to New York's 107.

Backers of St. Louis, however, believed that the city "would hold out such alluring inducements to the world that the same people who went to Chicago, or at least a large number of them, would be attracted to St. Louis" after visiting the Chicago fair. Businessmen Samuel M. Kennard, president, and Frank Gaiennie, secretary, thereupon organized a mass meeting for the purpose of making the city's autumn carnivals of 1891 through 1893 "of unrivaled splendor."

== Planning meeting ==
Kennard told an enthusiastic throng gathered in Exposition Entertainment Hall on May 11, 1891, that the meeting had for "its one object the advancement of St. Louis and the commercial and manufacturing position she is sure to occupy in the future. . . . [We] must be up and doing, . . . and we must have an attraction in St. Louis, and that is what we are here for tonight" [applause].<

Frank Gaiennie, the chairman of the program committee, said:

Let St. Louis be known as she deserves to be known at home and abroad, and during the usual forty days of our autumnal activities, let her blossom as the rose, and the thousands of visitors to our grand country and the Columbian Fair [in Chicago] will be so pleased with Missouri's exhibit there that, as a matter of course, they will feel an instinctive inclination to come to the very fountain head and visit the Commonwealth of Missouri, rich in agricultural products, rich in coal, iron and other minerals, the fifth state in population and, above all, containing the fifth city in the Union — St. Louis — where imposing pageantries, brilliant civic displays, illuminations of gas and electric light will dazzle the eye of the beholders and leave an impression which will never be forgotten.

[Edward] Wilkerson, head of the illumination committee, outlined proposed colorful electric lighting displays and a "colossal reproduction of the statue of Liberty Enlightening the World," which had been dedicated in New York Harbor in 1886. "At this juncture," the Globe-Democrat reported, "the electric lights were suddenly darkened in the hall and a curtain raised at the back of the stage displaying a beautiful illustration of the proposed effect . . . which was greeted with enthusiastic manifestations of approval by the audience."

Wilkerson asked the question: "Shall we proceed in a regular and increasing blaze of glory or sit supinely by and rest under the shadow of the Columbian Exposition at Chicago?" He answered himself that "the time is now at hand for the inauguration of this great enterprise."

Goodman King, chairman of the Advertising Committee, proposed that $100,000 a year be spent on publicity, and former Missouri Governor Edwin O. Stanard, head of the transportation committee, enunciated that "when a passenger buys a [railroad] ticket in the United States or in Canada [laughter] . . . [it must] have a St. Louis coupon upon it. [Cheers and laughter.) . . . We will keep them [the passengers] here as long as we can interest them. . . . We would not dim the light of a single solitary star in Chicago's crown [cheers], but we must not be complained of it we undertake to burnish and brighten some of the stars in our own crown. [Laughter and loud cheers.]"

Henry J. Meyer of the Committee on Hotels reported that a joint meeting with the Merchants' Exchange and the Mercantile Club had decided that "a movement be inaugurated to raise a bonus of $100,000, which shall be given to any individual, company or corporation who will build a first-class, fire-proof hotel, occupying at least a half square of ground, situated in or near the business center of the city and containing not less than 500 rooms. . . . The committee also suggested that the erection of two second-class hotels and another first-class hotel in the West End would also be very appropriate."

== Results ==
During the campaign, "Advertisements were published in all parts of the United States and in many foreign countries, elaborate illustrated articles were placed in the leading magazines and a weekly letter on the advantages of St. Louis was sent to upwards of 500 Southern and Western journals. No other city in America, with the single exception of Chicago, has been so thoroughly and so effectually advertised."

Such a generous outpouring of money has been rarely known in connection with any public appeal. Out of 4,000 requests for subscription that were sent out by the Finance Committee[,] there were not more than half a dozen that were returned without a check. Not only the business men, but the clerks, the mechanics and in fact men in every vocation and condition contributed to the fund that was to glorify St. Louis before the world.

As well, some $600,000 was pledged for the construction of a million-dollar hotel that would be a "credit to the city." On October 2, it was announced that "The erection of a hotel to cost $2,000,000 is assured to St. Louis. It will be built, and Chicago capitalists will furnish the money for its erection." The "bonus" for the construction was to come from the Autumnal Festival Committee.

On September 2, 1891, the St. Louis Exposition opened with a "grand illumination of the streets," as well as the placement of the Statue of Liberty reproduction. The monument to Ulysses S. Grant in Washington Square Park was "surrounded by an illuminated allegorical arch, of which a figure of peace" was the keystone.

== Additional reading ==
- "Carnival in St. Louis," The New York World, August 30, 1891, cited in "Have a Wide Fame," St. Louis Post-Dispatch, September 6, 1891, image 12 "The Autumnal Festival Committee is making preparations on an elaborate scale for an entertainment which will make the conclave memorable."
