= 1950 United States elections =

- ← 1948 1949 1950 1951 1952 → Midterm elections
- Election day: November 7
- Incumbent president: ▌Harry S. Truman (D)
- Next Congress: 82nd

Senate elections
- Overall control: Democratic hold
- Seats contested: 36 of 96 seats (32 Class 3 seats + 6 special elections)
- Net seat change: Republican +5
- 1950 Senate election results Democratic gain Democratic hold Republican gain Republican hold

House elections
- Overall control: Democratic hold
- Seats contested: All 435 voting seats
- Popular vote margin: Democratic +0.7%
- Net seat change: Republican +28

Gubernatorial elections
- Seats contested: 33
- Net seat change: Republican +6
- 1950 gubernatorial election results Democratic hold Republican gain Republican hold

Elections were held on November 7, 1950, and elected the members of the 82nd United States Congress. The election took place during the Korean War, during Democratic President Harry S. Truman's second (only full) term. The Democrats lost twenty-eight seats to the Republican Party in the House of Representatives. The Democrats also lost five seats in the U.S. Senate to the Republicans. The defeat of the Labor Party congressman Vito Marcantonio left the third parties without representation in Congress for the first time since 1908.

Like his predecessor Franklin D. Roosevelt in 1938, Truman and the Democratic party managed to maintain control of both houses, defying the six-year itch phenomenon for the second time in a row. However, the election was still a defeat for Truman, as it strengthened the conservative coalition and ensured that none of Truman's Fair Deal policies would pass. Republicans also ran against Truman's prosecution of the Korean War, and the 82nd Congress subsequently conducted numerous investigations into the course of the war. The election set the stage for the presidency of Republican Dwight D. Eisenhower and the centre-right policies of the 1950s.

== See also ==
- 1950 United States House of Representatives elections
- 1950 United States Senate elections
- 1950 United States gubernatorial elections
- 1950 Progressive National Convention
