= Harry Brookings Wallace =

American academic administrator

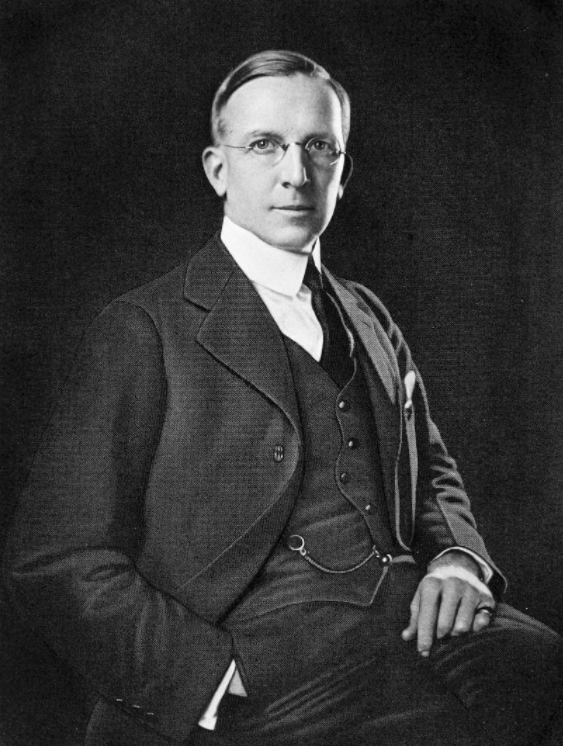
- Born: August 6, 1877; St. Louis, Missouri
- Died: August 11, 1955 (aged 78); St. Louis, Missouri
- Burial place: Bellefontaine Cemetery
- Education: Yale University
- Occupations: Businessman, academic administrator
- Relatives: Robert S. Brookings (uncle)

Harry Brookings Wallace (August 6, 1877 – August 11, 1955) was the acting chancellor of Washington University in St. Louis from 1944 to 1945.

== Biography ==
Harry Brookings Wallace was born in St. Louis on August 6, 1877. He attended Smith Academy in St. Louis, and graduated from Yale University in 1899. While there, he was a varsity baseball player.

He married Mary Kennard, daughter of St. Louis businessman and confederate soldier Samuel Kennard.

The nephew of Robert S. Brookings, he became a trustee of the Brookings Institution in 1927. He was president of Cupples & Marston from 1917 to 1942.

He was the acting chancellor of Washington University in St. Louis from July 1944 to September 1945.

He died at his home in St. Louis on August 11, 1955, and was buried at Bellefontaine Cemetery.
