= William Rogers =

William Rogers may refer to:

== Politics ==
- William Rogers (Australian politician) (1818–1903), builder and pastoralist in colonial South Australia
- William Rogers (MP) (1498–1553), member of parliament for Norwich
- William Rogers (Wisconsin politician) (1838–1911), Wisconsin state assemblyman and judge
- William Charles Rogers (1847–1917), Cherokee leader
- William D. Rogers (1927–2007), U.S. assistant secretary of state for inter-American affairs
- William Findlay Rogers (1820–1899), congressman from New York, 1883–1884
- William H. Rogers (mayor) (1850–1935), mayor of Madison, Wisconsin
- William Hudson Rogers (1894–1975), professor of English
- William J. Rogers (1930–2005), Wisconsin state assemblyman
- William N. Rogers (1892–1945), congressman from New Hampshire, 1923–1924 and 1931–1936
- William P. Rogers (1913–2001), U.S. attorney general under Dwight Eisenhower and secretary of state under Richard Nixon
- Will Rogers (Maine politician) (born 1938), realtor and politician in Maine
- Will Rogers Jr. (1911–1993), congressman from California and son of the noted humorist
- Will Rogers (trade unionist) (William John Rogers, died 1952), British trade unionist and political activist
- Bill Rogers (New Zealand politician) (William James Rogers, 1887–1971)

== Sports ==
- William Rogers (Canadian football) (born 1928), Canadian football player
- William Rogers (rugby union) (1902–1987), American rugby union footballer
- William Henry Hamilton Rogers (1823–1913), English historian and antiquarian
- Bill Rogers (golfer) (William Charles Rogers, born 1951), American golfer
- Billy Rogers (footballer) (1905–1936), Welsh international footballer
- Billy Rogers (rugby league) (born 1989), Australian rugby league footballer
- Billy Rogers (soccer) (born 1949), Australian former association football player
- Will Rogers (American football) (born 2001), American football player
- Nat Rogers (William Nathaniel Rogers, 1893–1981), American baseball player
- Bill Rogers (footballer) (William Martin Rogers, 1893–1918), Australian rules footballer
- Willie Rogers (Australian footballer) (William Rogers, 1883–1956), Australian rules footballer
- Bill Rogers (speedway rider) (William Rogers, 1911–1992), Australian motorcycle speedway rider
- Bill Rogers (tackle) (William Curtis Rogers, 1913–1977), American football player

== Other ==
- William Rogers (engraver) (fl. 1580–1610), English engraver
- William Allen Rogers (1854–1931), political cartoonist for the New York Herald
- William Barton Rogers (1804–1882), founder of MIT
- William C. Rogers III (born 1938), commander of the USS Vincennes when it shot down Iran Air Flight 655
- William Evans Rogers (1846–1913), American businessman and railroad executive
- William H. Rogers (architect) (1914–2008), English architect
- William H. Rogers Jr. (born 1957/58), American businessman
- William Hazen Rogers (1801–?), American master silversmith and pioneer in the silverplate industry
- William Peleg Rogers (1819–1862), Texan lawyer, political activist and Confederate army officer
- William Percy Rogers (1914–1997), Australian zoologist
- William W. Rogers (1893–1976), United States Marine Corps general
- William Wendell Rogers (1896–1967), World War I flying ace
- Will Rogers (1879–1935), "Cherokee Kid" cowboy and humorist
- Bill Rogers (voice actor) (William Rogers), American voice actor

== Characters ==
- Captain William Anthony "Buck" Rogers, in Buck Rogers in the 25th Century

== See also ==
- Bill Rogers (disambiguation)
- Will Rogers (disambiguation)
- Billie Rogers (1917–2014), big band jazz trumpeter born Zelda Louise Smith
- Bernard William Rogers (1921–2008), United States Army general
- Willie Rogers (disambiguation)
- William Rodgers (disambiguation)
