= Willie Rogers =

Willie Rogers may refer to:

- Willie Rogers (Australian footballer) (1883–1956), Australian footballer for Melbourne
- Willie Rogers (basketball) (born 1945), retired American basketball player
- Willie Rogers (footballer, born 1919) (1919–1974), English footballer (Blackburn Rovers, Barrow AFC)
- Willie Rogers (Tuskegee) (1915–2016), member of the Tuskegee Airmen

== See also ==
- William Rogers (disambiguation)
