= Will Rogers (disambiguation) =

Will Rogers (1879–1935) was an American humorist.

Will Rogers may also refer to:

== People ==
- Will Rodgers (born 1994), NASCAR driver
- Will Rogers (American football) (born 2001), American football quarterback
- Will Rogers (Maine politician) (born 1938), American realtor and politician from Maine
- Will Rogers (Oklahoma politician) (1898–1983), congressman and politician from Oklahoma
- Will Rogers (trade unionist) (died 1952), British trade unionist and politician
- Will Rogers Jr. (1911–1993), US representative from California
- Will Rogers, actor in the 2019 film A Rainy Day in New York

== Other uses ==
- USS Will Rogers, a nuclear submarine
- Will Rogers State Historic Park, Los Angeles, California
- Will Rogers World Airport, Oklahoma
- Will Rogers Gardens, Oklahoma City, Oklahoma
- Will Rogers (Davidson), a statue created by Jo Davidson
- Will Rogers' USA play
