= Bill Rogers =

Bill Rogers may refer to:

== Sports ==
- Bill Rogers (footballer) (1893–1918), Australian rules footballer
- Bill Rogers (quarterback), college football and basketball player
- Bill Rogers (speedway rider) (1911–1992), Australian speedway rider
- Bill Rogers (tackle) (1913–1977), American football player
- Bill Rogers (golfer) (born 1951), American golfer
- Bill Rogers (athlete) (born 1985), Liberian runner

== Others ==
- Bill Rogers (educationalist), Australian educationalist
- Bill Rogers (Michigan politician) (born 1954), member of the Michigan House of Representatives (2009–2012)
- Bill Rogers (New Zealand politician) (1887–1971), member of the New Zealand Legislative Council (1940–1950)
- Bill Rogers (voice actor), New York-based voice actor
- Bill Rogers (musician) (1906–1984), Guyanese musician, born Augustus Hinds

== See also ==
- Billie Rogers (1917–2014), big band jazz trumpeter born Zelda Louise Smith
- William Rogers (disambiguation)
- William Rodgers (disambiguation)
