= William Rodgers =

William or Bill Rodgers may refer to:

- William P. Rodgers, member of the 1859–1860 California State Assembly
- William Ledyard Rodgers (1860–1944), American naval officer and historian
- Bill Rodgers (infielder) (1887–1978), American baseball player with the Boston Red Sox
- W. R. Rodgers (William Robert Rodgers, 1909–1969), Northern Irish poet, book reviewer and radio broadcaster
- Bill Rodgers (outfielder) (1922–2002), American baseball player
- Bill Rodgers, Baron Rodgers of Quarry Bank (born 1928), British politician
- Bill Rodgers (runner) (born 1947), American marathon runner
- William C. Rodgers (1965–2005), American environmental activist and owner of Catalyst Infoshop
- William Rodgers (economist), American economist and professor of public policy

== See also ==
- Bill Rogers (disambiguation)
- William Rogers (disambiguation)
