= Russell Perry =

Russell Perry may refer to:

- Russell Perry (politician) (1915–1981), civil servant, merchant, and political figure on Prince Edward Island
- Russell M. Perry, American businessman, banker, publisher, and broadcaster from Oklahoma
- Russell Perry Mace (1820–1894), American politician, and veteran of the Mexican–American War
- Russell Perry (weightlifter) (born 1938), Australian weightlifter
