= Shanto =

Music genre

Shanto is a form of Guyanese music, related to both calypso and mento. It became a major part of early popular music through its use in Guyanese vaudeville shows; songs are topical and light-hearted, often accompanied by a guitar.

The word "shanto" is a conflation of "shanty" - the term used in Guyana for work songs - and "calypso". The style was developed and named in the 1920s by musician Bill Rogers (Augustus Hinds, 1906–1984), who described it as "an improvisation of words and music with an Afro-West Indian beat, with satirical comments on people, events and things...". In the 1930s, the "bargee" (or "bhajee") beat became synonymous with shanto. Rogers was the most versatile and popular practitioner of the shanto style; other popular figures included Joe Coggins, Zeda Martindale, and Ralph FitzScott. Bill Rogers' son, Roger Hinds, has continued to perform and record shanto music as "Young Bill Rogers".
