= Walt Whitman (Davidson) =

Statue by Jo Davidson

Coordinates: 39.9118°N 75.172°W

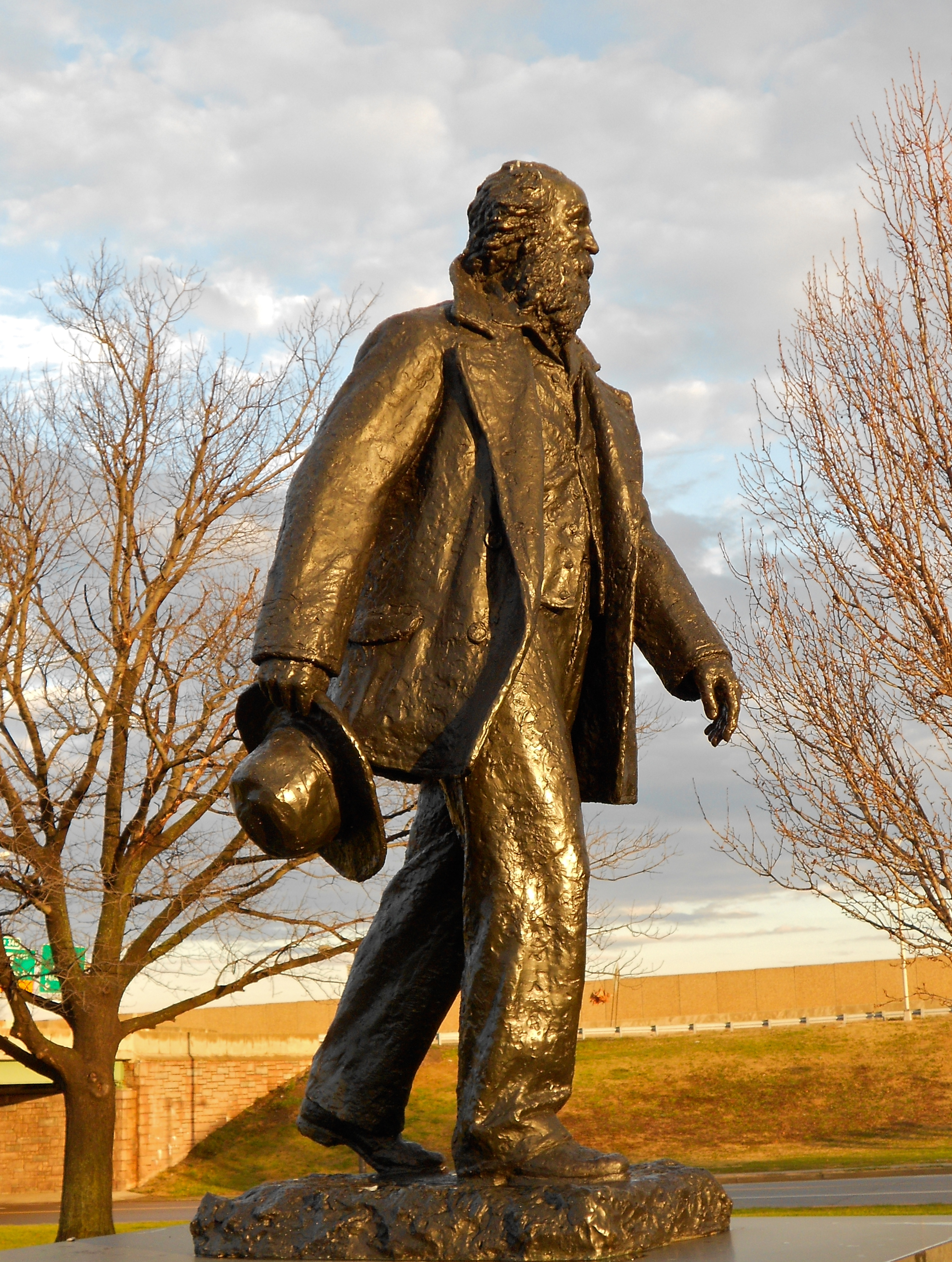
Philadelphia statue on Broad Street

Walt Whitman is a statue of Walt Whitman by Jo Davidson. There are several castings of it.

Davidson began working on a depiction of Whitman after entering a competition for it in 1925. Although that statue was never developed, Davidson continued to refine what he had started.

While working on the statue, Davidson first made a life-sized clay nude, then had a special armature created that allowed him to independently move the arms and legs, allowing him to get the exact movement that he was seeking. Davidson stated, "Nothing in my statue of Walt Whitman could be static and finally, I got the rhythm I was after."

The statue was first exhibited at the New York Worlds Fair in 1939. Then, also in 1939 Averell Harriman (whom Davidson had already done a bust of) suggested to Davidson that the work be placed in the Bear Mountain State Park. Davidson inspected the site, found it acceptable and the statue was placed there. At the statue's unveiling New York Park Commissioner Robert Moses quipped, "I am not sure if this is a statue of Walt Whitman by Jo Davidson or a statue of Jo Davidson by Walt Whitman."

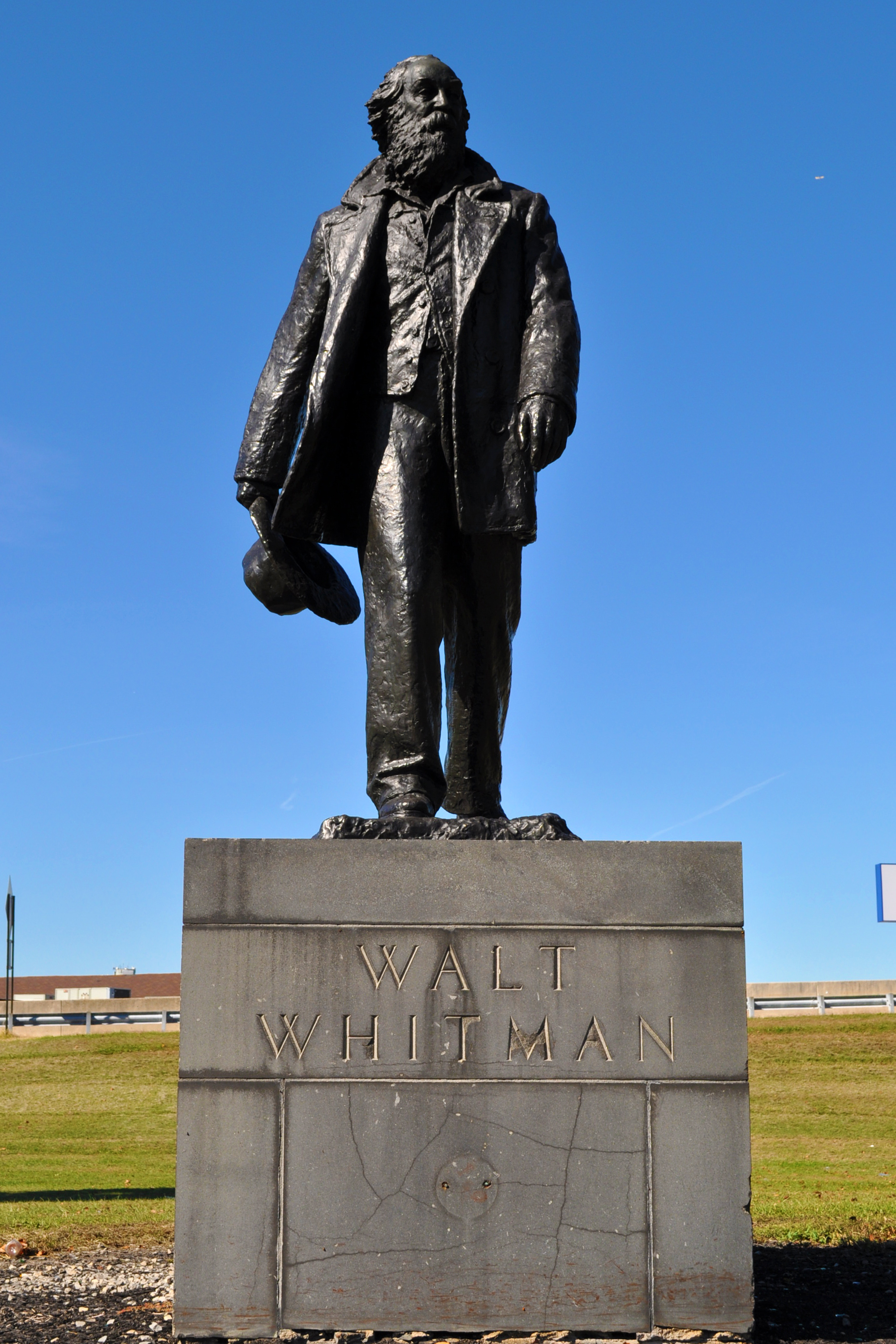
Philadelphia statue

Another casting of the statue was done in 1957, purchased by the Fairmount Park Art Association and placed at the intersection of Broad Street and Packer Avenue, near the approach to the Walt Whitman Bridge.

== In popular culture ==
- Poet Louis Simpson published a poem entitled “Walt Whitman at Bear Mountain in which he announces, “Even the bronze looks alive”.
- The work can be observed in the upper right hand of the 70 Sculptors photograph taken at the 3rd Sculpture International exhibition in Philadelphia in 1949. Davidson can be found in the picture seated in the front row, second from the right.

== See also ==
- List of public art in Philadelphia

== Bibliography ==
- Davidson, Jo (1951). Between Sittings: An Informal Autobiography of Jo Davidson. New York: The Dial Press.
- Fairmount Park Art Association (1974). Sculpture of a City: Philadelphia's Treasures in Bronze and Stone. Walker Publishing Company. ISBN 978-0-8027-0459-7.
- Kuhn, Lois Harris (1958). The world of Jo Davidson. illustrated by Leonard Everett Fisher. Jewish Publication Society. OCLC 200249291.
