= Jo Davidson =

American sculptor (1883–1952)

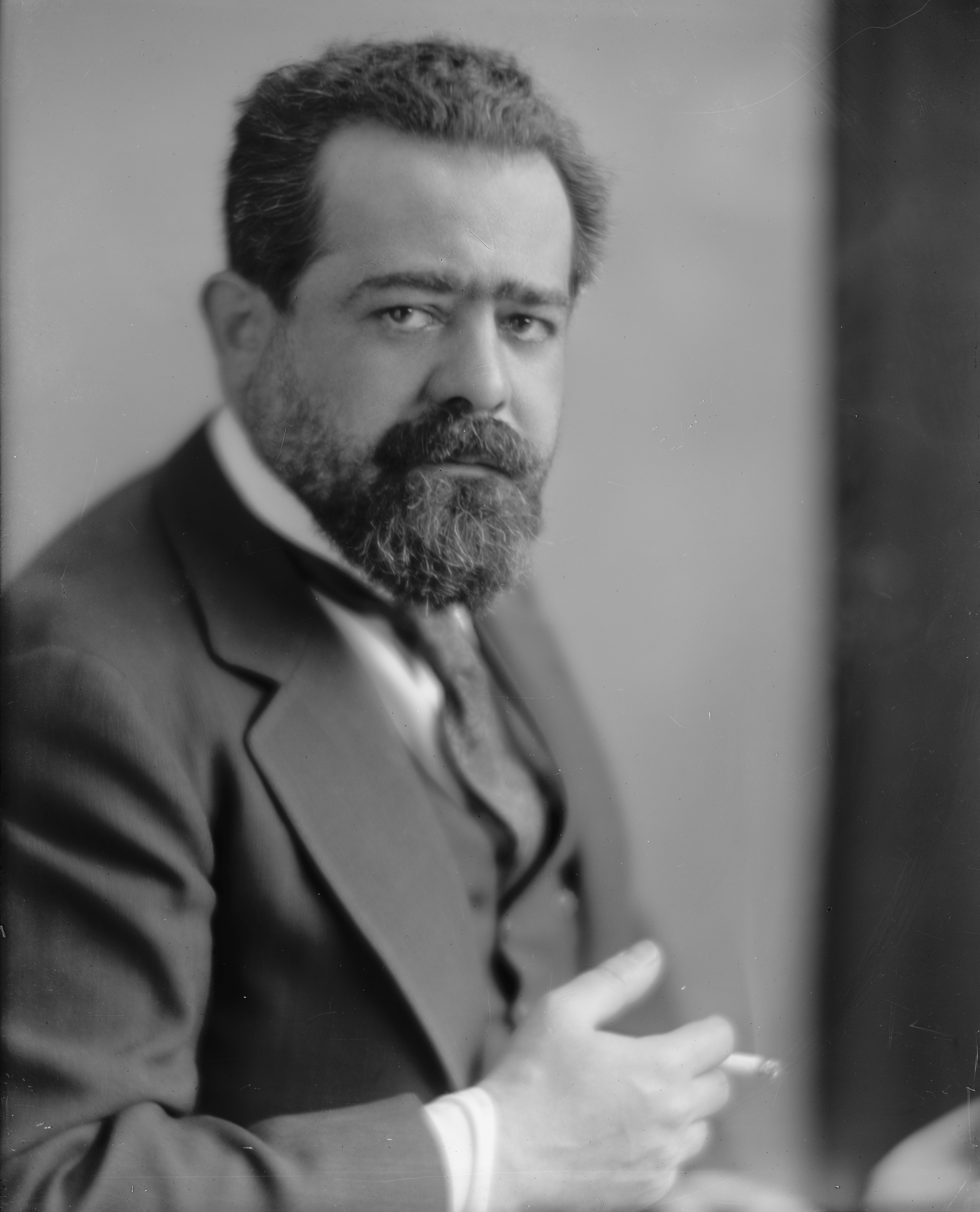
Jo Davidson

Jo Davidson (March 30, 1883 – January 2, 1952) was an American sculptor. Although he specialized in realistic, intense portrait busts, Davidson did not require his subjects to formally pose for him; rather, he observed and spoke with them. He worked primarily with clay, while the final products were typically cast in terra-cotta or bronze, or carved from marble.

== Background ==
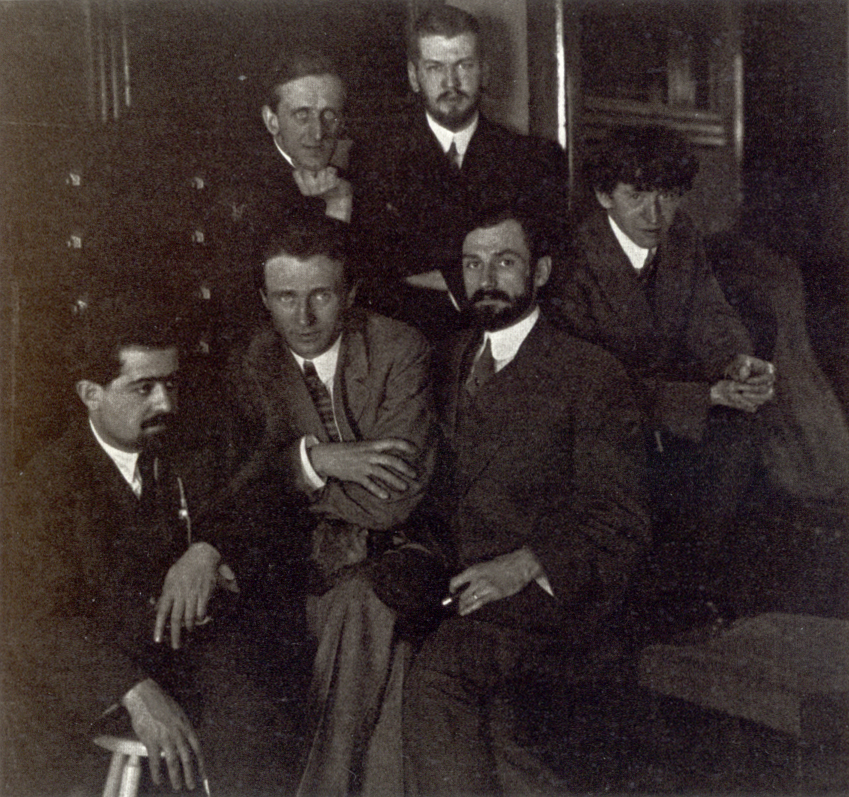
Young American Artists of the Modern School, L. to R. Jo Davidson, Edward Steichen, Arthur B. Carles, John Marin; back: Marsden Hartley, Laurence Fellows, c. 1911, Bates College Museum of Art

Davidson was born in New York City, where he was educated before going to work in the atelier of American sculptor Hermon Atkins MacNeil. He subsequently moved to Paris in 1907 to study sculpture at the Ecole des Beaux-Arts.

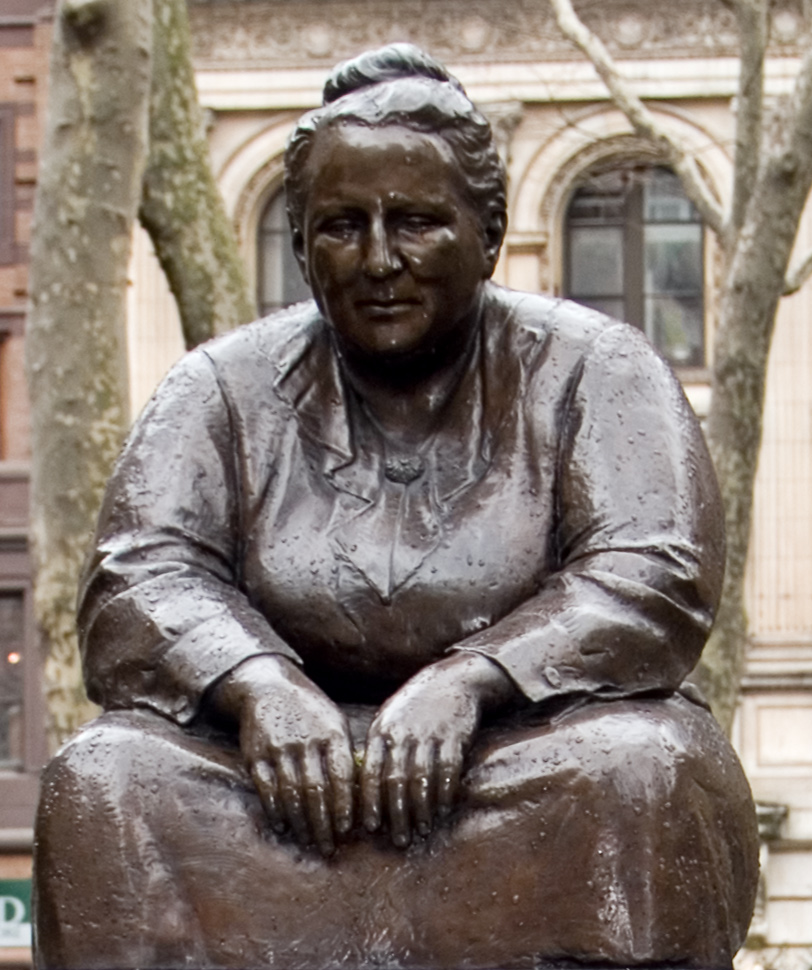
Jo Davidson's life-size sculpture of Gertrude Stein was created in Paris in 1923, and a bronze cast of it was made in 1991 for Bryant Park, Manhattan, New York City. Sculptor Jo Davidson (a Stein friend from her Paris years) wrote, "She somehow symbolized wisdom" and he depicted her as "a sort of modern Buddha."

== Career ==
=== Art ===
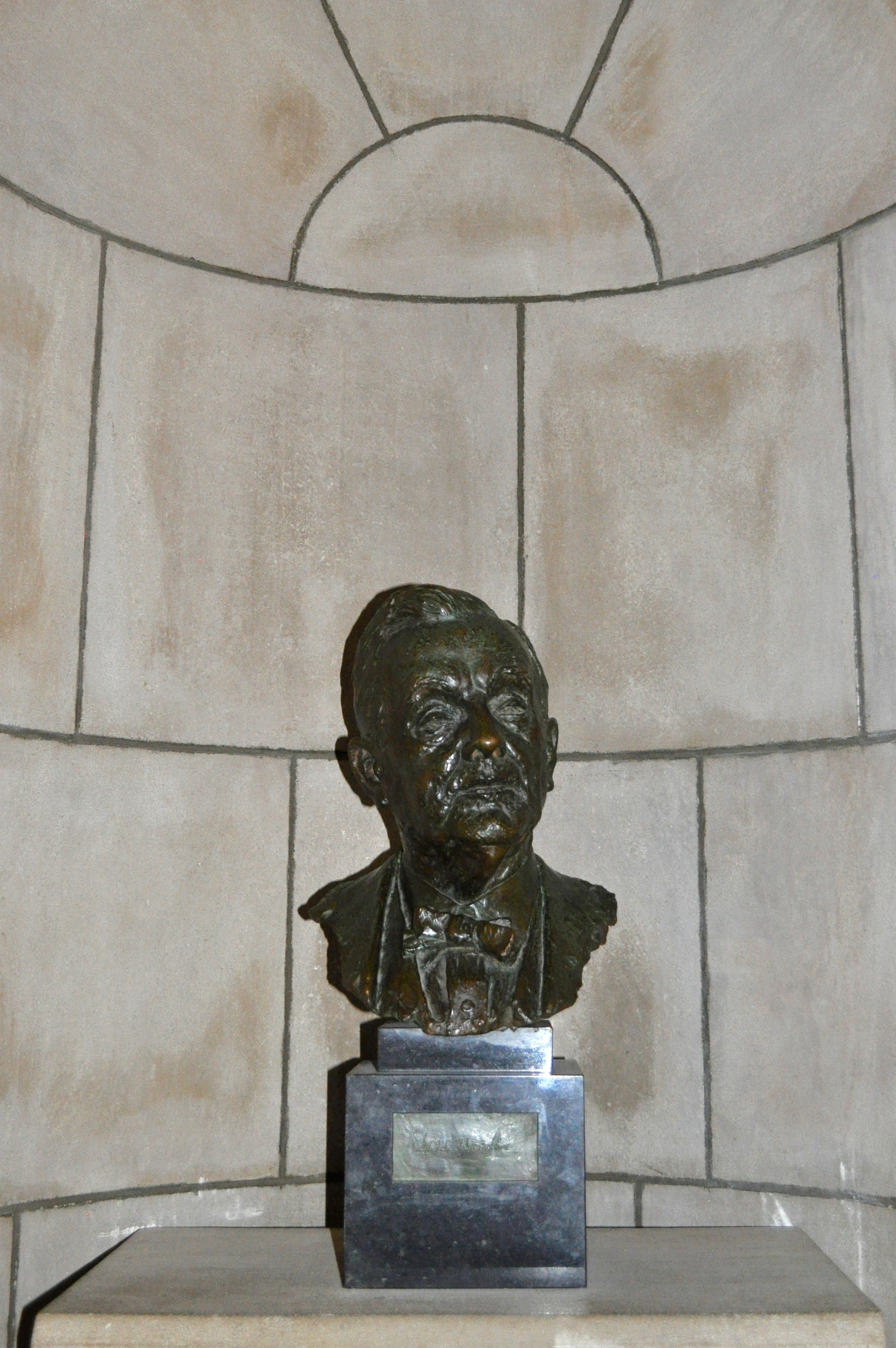
A bust of George W. Norris created by Jo Davidson in 1942 for the Nebraska Hall of Fame.

After returning to the United States, he was befriended by Gertrude Vanderbilt Whitney, who purchased some of his work.

In 1911 Davidson secured his first solo gallery shows. In 1927 he was one of a dozen sculptors invited by the oilman E. W. Marland to compete for a commission for a Pioneer Woman statue in Ponca City. Each was paid a commission to produce a small model, and the dozen works were exhibited in major cities in the US. Davidson did not win the commission.

In 1934 Davidson won the National Academy of Design's Maynard Prize. In 1944, he was elected into the National Academy of Design as an Associate Academician. In 1947 the American Academy of Arts and Letters hosted a retrospective featuring nearly 200 of his works. In the summer of 1949, Davidson was one of 250 sculptors who exhibited in the 3rd Sculpture International held at the Philadelphia Museum of Art.

Among Davidson's commissions are a design for a United States War Industries badge, a collection of pieces for the Government of France to commemorate the first victory of the Troupes de Marine, and bronze busts of the leaders of the First World War Allies. His portraits of world leaders and celebrated figures gained him international acclaim. He created statues of oilman and future governor E. W. Marland and his two adoptive grown children.

=== Politics ===
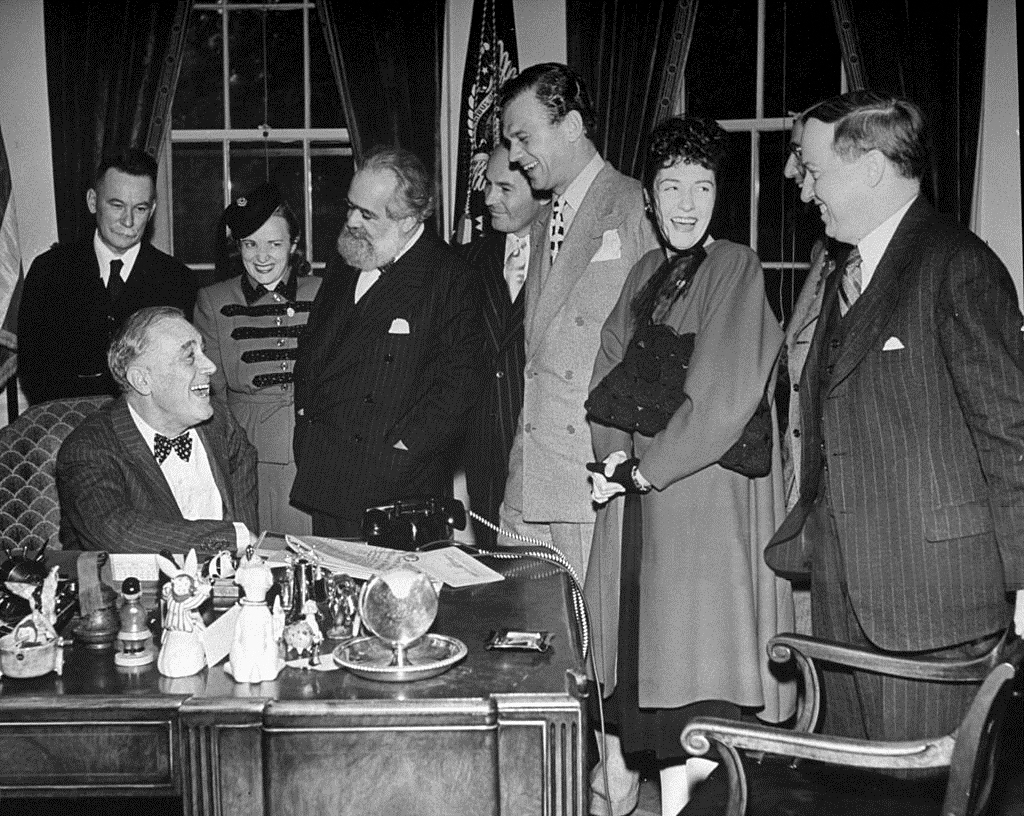
Members of the Independent Voters Committee of the Arts and Sciences for Roosevelt visit FDR at the White House (October 1944). From left, Van Wyck Brooks, Hannah Dorner, Jo Davidson, Jan Kiepura, Joseph Cotten, Dorothy Gish, Dr. Harlow Shapley.

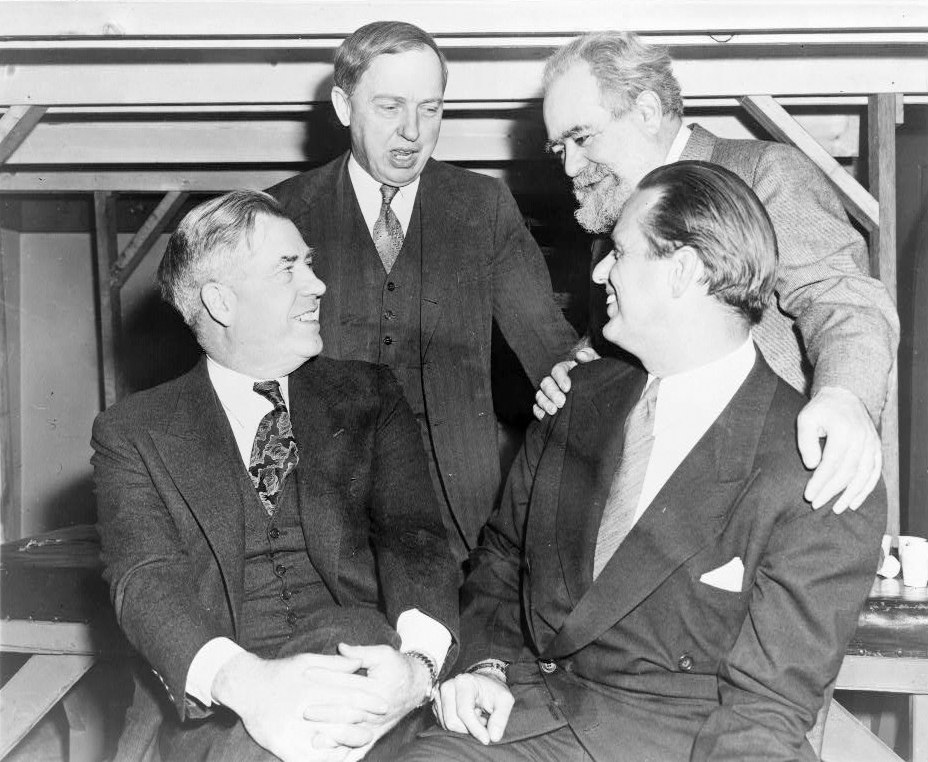
Progressive Citizens of America members, 1947. From left, seated, Henry A. Wallace, Elliott Roosevelt; standing, Dr. Harlow Shapley, Jo Davidson

Davidson served as chairman of the Independent Citizens Committee of the Arts, Sciences and Professions (ICCASP), a leftist-liberal group that supported the policies of President Franklin D. Roosevelt and his re-election. In 1946 this group merged with the National Citizens Political Action Committee (NCPAC) to become the Progressive Citizens of America (PCA); Davidson became co-chairman (the other chairman being Dr. Frank Kingdon).

PCA struggled during tensions of the Cold War, with its members under suspicion by the House Un-American Activities Committee (HUAC) for leftist leanings. It worked for racial equality, economic justice and civil liberties. Important segments of the PCA became the base for Henry A. Wallace's candidacy for U.S. President in 1948 on the Progressive Party ticket.

== Commissions ==
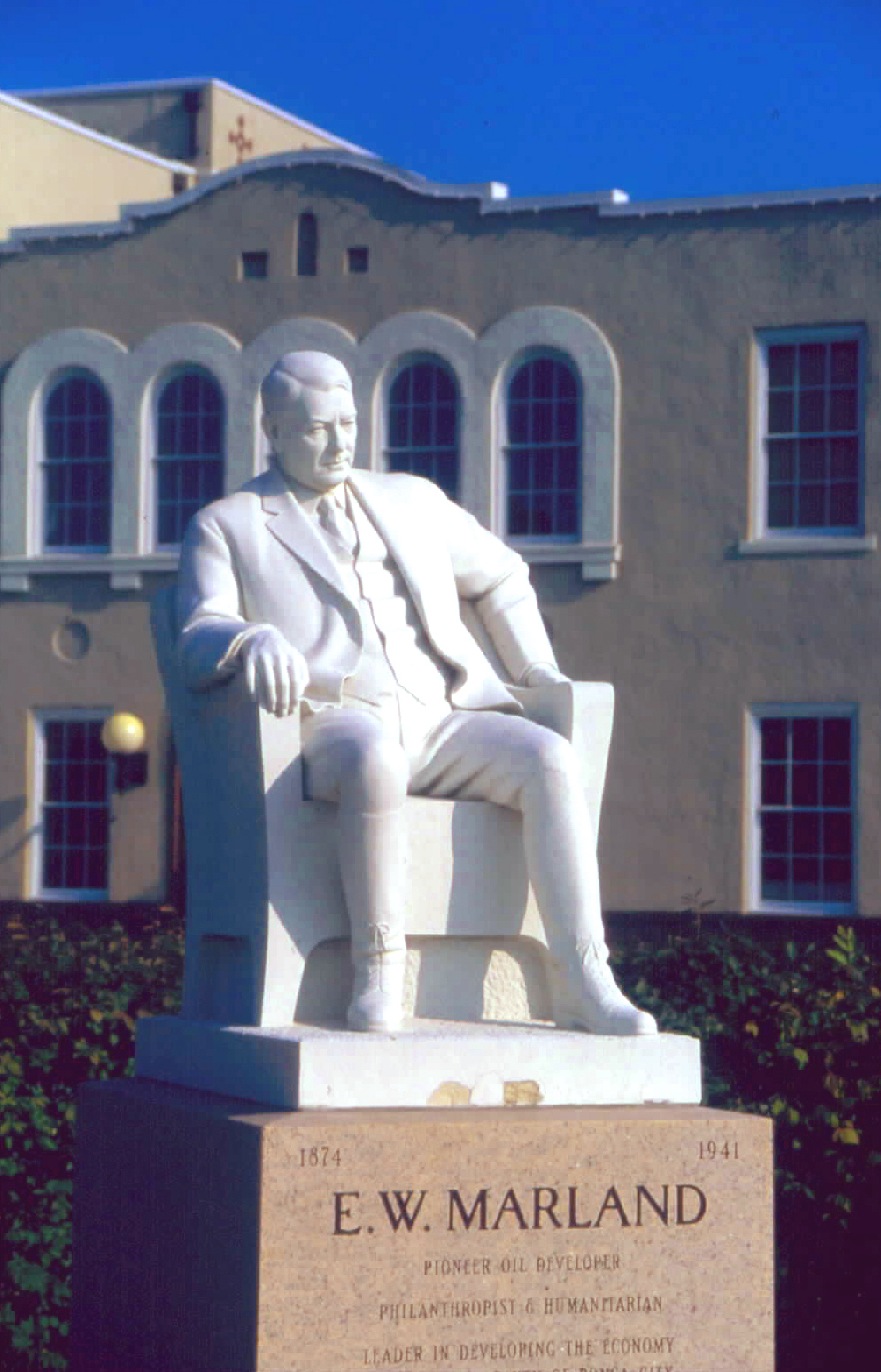
E. W. Marland, Ponca City, Oklahoma

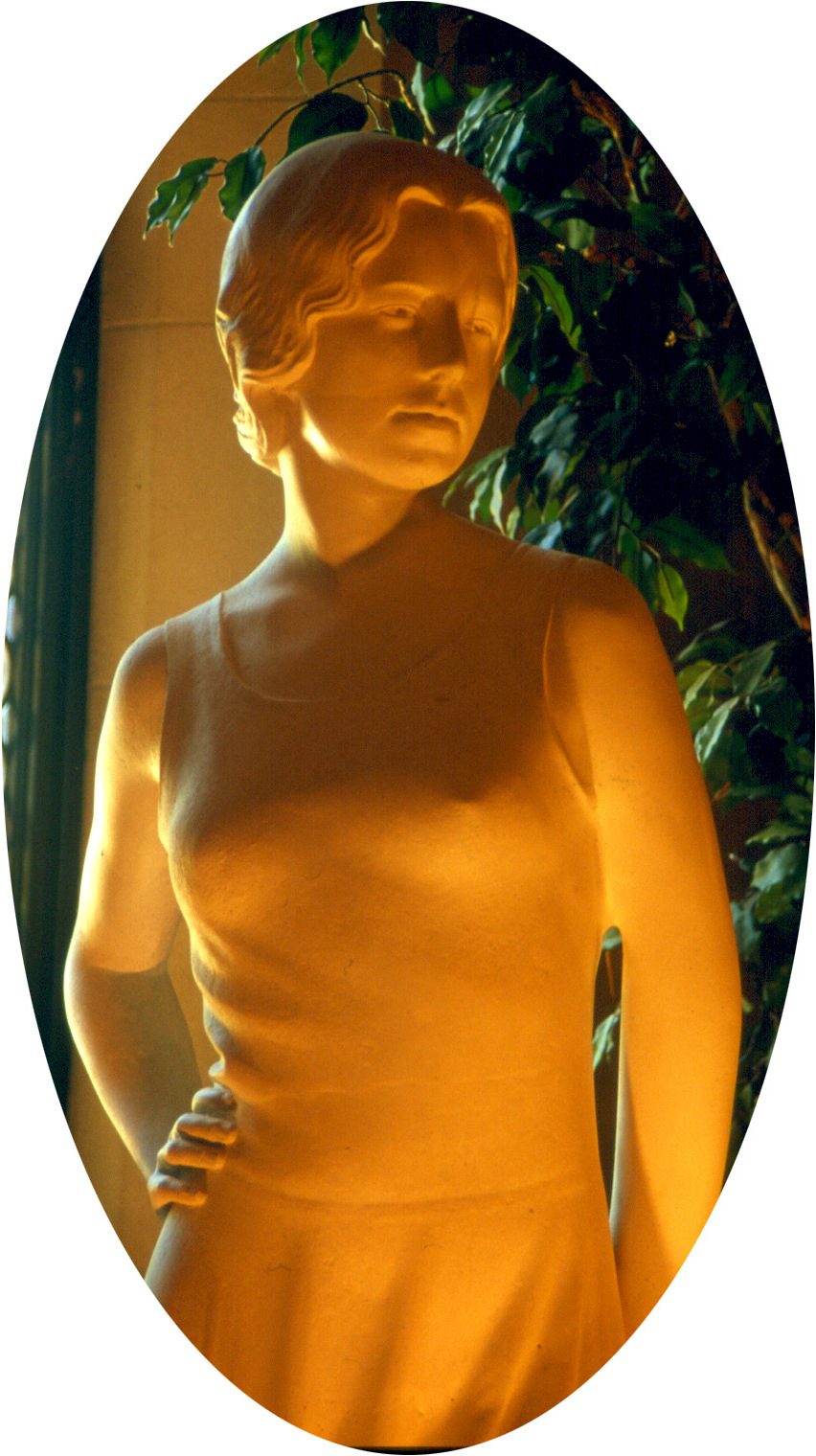
Lydie Marland

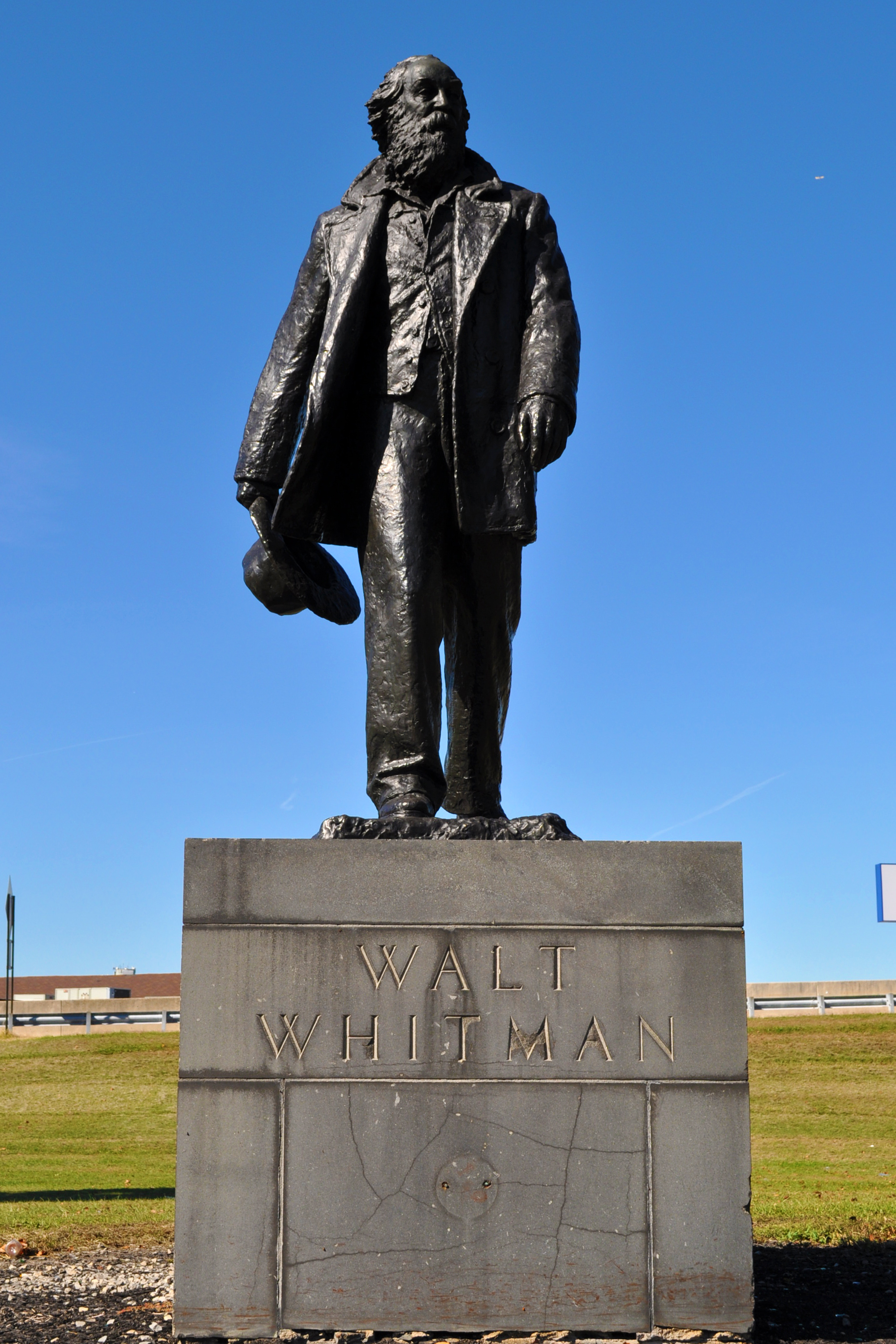
Walt Whitman by Davidson at the Walt Whitman Bridge Entrance, Philadelphia

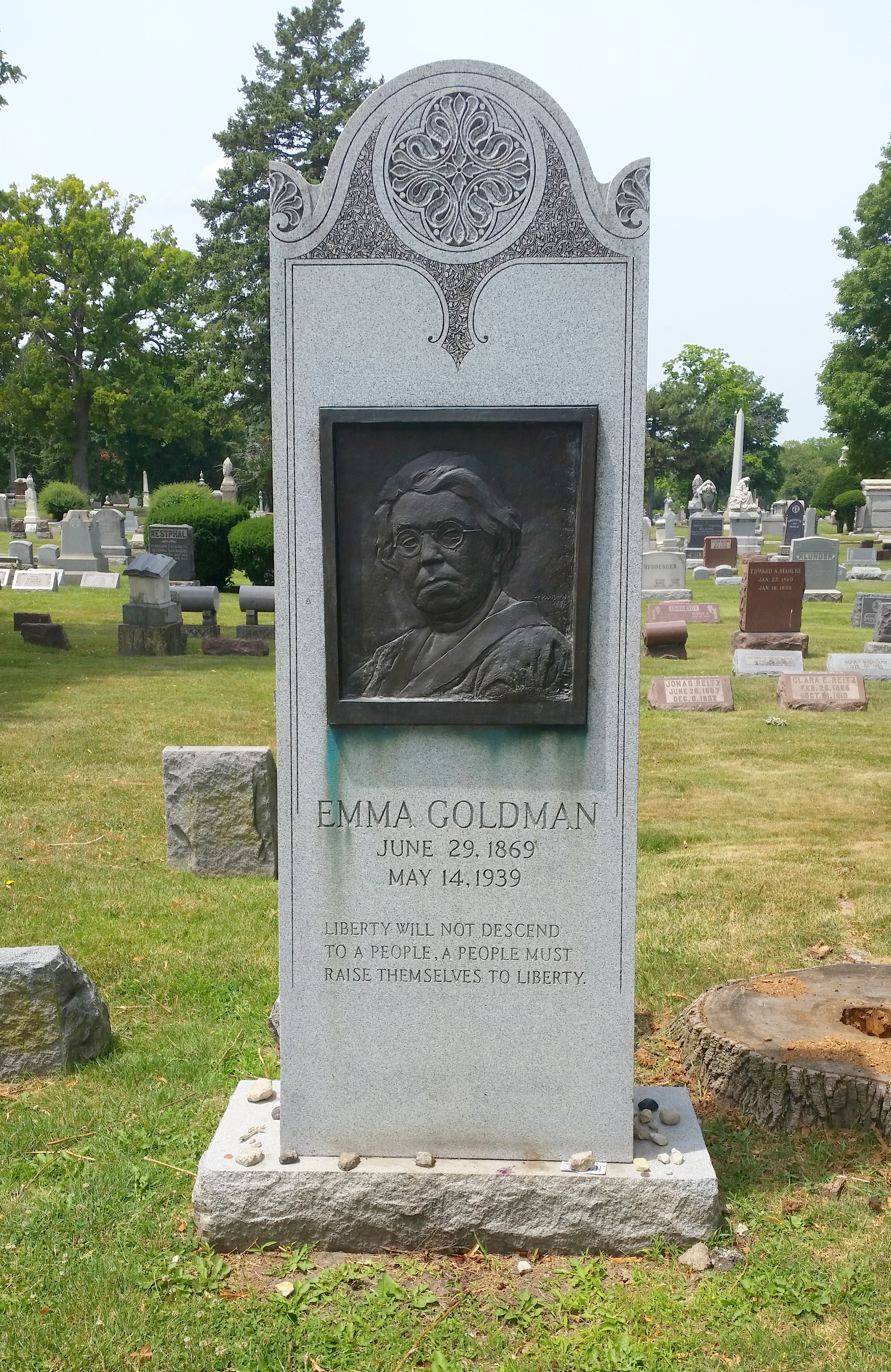
The bas-relief of Emma Goldman's gravestone, Forest Home Cemetery, Forest Park, Illinois

- Manuel Azaña
- Julio Álvarez del Vayo
- James Barrie
- Nicholas Murray Butler
- Charlie Chaplin
- Madame Chiang Kai-shek
- Joseph Conrad
- Émile Coué (who was also a sculptor in his spare time)
- Clarence Darrow
- Charles G. Dawes - bust, part of the United States Senate Vice Presidential Bust Collection
- Arthur Conan Doyle
- Albert Einstein
- Dwight D. Eisenhower
- Marshal Ferdinand Foch
- Anatole France
- Mahatma Gandhi
- André Gide
- Emma Goldman
- W. Averell Harriman
- Frank Harris
- Dolores Ibárruri (La Pasionaria)
- Robinson Jeffers
- James Joyce
- Otto Kahn
- Helen Keller
- Rudyard Kipling
- Robert M. La Follette, Wisconsin contribution to National Statuary Hall, United States Capitol
- D. H. Lawrence
- Edward Drummond Libbey, founder of the Libbey Glass Company and the Toledo Museum of Art in Toledo, Ohio
- Yutang Lin - bust, part of the National Palace Museum(Taipei) collection
- Henry Luce
- John Marin
- E. W. Marland
- Lydie Marland and her brother George Roberts Marland
- Lowell Mellett
- Andrew Mellon
- Constancia de la Mora
- General John J. Pershing
- John D. Rockefeller
- Will Rogers (posthumous) - the original statue donated to the Will Rogers Memorial Hospital in Saranac Lake, New York
- Will Rogers (posthumous) - bronze, Oklahoma contribution to National Statuary Hall, United States Capitol, erected in 1939
- Franklin Delano Roosevelt installed at the Franklin D. Roosevelt Four Freedoms Park
- Ida Rubinstein
- Carl Sandburg
- E. W. Scripps
- George Bernard Shaw
- Frank Sinatra
- Lincoln Steffens
- Gertrude Stein
- Rabindranath Tagore
- Marshal Tito
- Getúlio Vargas
- H. G. Wells
- Henry A. Wallace - bust, part of the United States Senate Vice Presidential Bust Collection
- Walt Whitman (posthumous) - full-body bronze statue at the Walt Whitman Bridge in Philadelphia, and in Bear Mountain State Park, New York.
- Gertrude Vanderbilt Whitney
- Walt Whitman statue
- Evan Williams (Opera tenor)
- Woodrow Wilson
- Israel Zangwill
- Adolph Zukor

== Collections ==
Some of Davidson's work is in the National Gallery of Art.

He also designed a statue of Henry D. Thoreau, the author of the 1854 book Walden. The statue is located at Walden Pond State Reservation in Concord, Massachusetts.

In 2006, The Smithsonian Institution's National Portrait Gallery opened a permanent exhibition, "Jo Davidson: Biographer in Bronze", showcasing fourteen Davidson works in terracotta and bronze, including portraits of Gertrude Stein and Lincoln Steffens.
