= Walt Whitman Bridge =

Bridge between Philadelphia, PA and Gloucester City, NJ

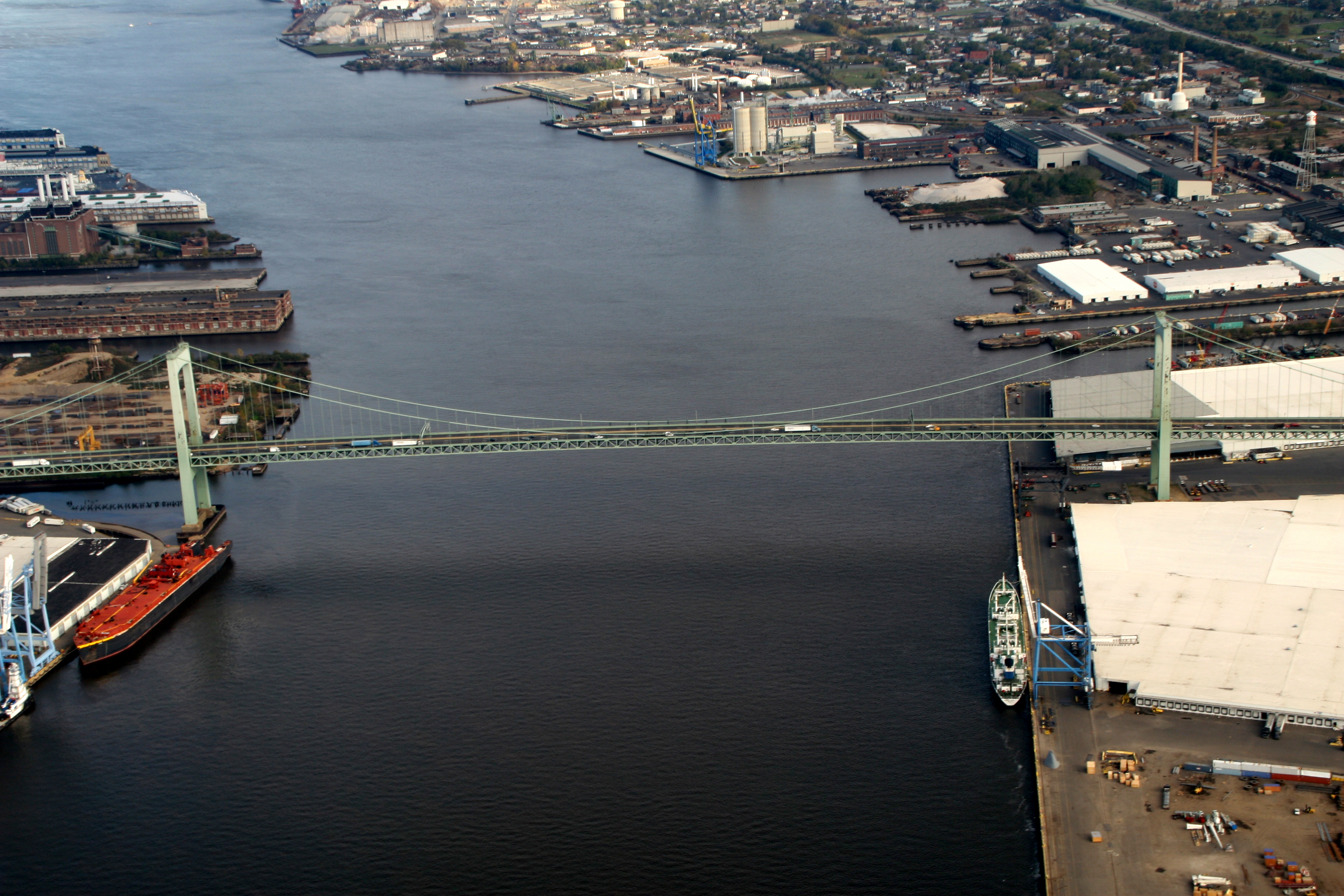
- Walt Whitman Bridge, connecting Gloucester City, New Jersey and Philadelphia
- Coordinates: 39°54′19″N 75°07′47″W
- Carries: 7 lanes of I-76
- Crosses: Delaware River
- Locale: Philadelphia, Pennsylvania to Gloucester City, New Jersey
- Official name: Walt Whitman Bridge
- Maintained by: Delaware River Port Authority of Pennsylvania and New Jersey
- ID number: 4500010

Characteristics
- Design: Steel suspension bridge
- Total length: 11,981 feet (3,652 m)
- Width: 92 feet 2 inches (28.09 m)
- Longest span: 2,000 feet (610 m)
- Clearance below: 150 feet (46 m)

History
- Opened: May 16, 1957; 69 years ago

Statistics
- Daily traffic: 120,000
- Toll: $6.00 (westbound) (E-ZPass) No toll for eastbound vehicles going from Pennsylvania to New Jersey.

Location
- Interactive map of Walt Whitman Bridge

The Walt Whitman Bridge is a single-level suspension bridge spanning the Delaware River from Philadelphia in the west to Gloucester City in Camden County, New Jersey in the east. The bridge is named after American poet and essayist Walt Whitman, who resided in nearby Camden toward the end of his life.

Walt Whitman Bridge is 11,981 feet (3,652 m) in length, making it one of the larger bridges on the East Coast of the United States. The bridge is owned and operated by the Delaware River Port Authority.

The bridge is a part of Interstate 76, which, between the Delaware River and the Pennsylvania Turnpike interchange in King of Prussia, Pennsylvania, is known as the Schuylkill Expressway; this was originally part of Interstate 676's route until it switched positions with I-76 in 1972.

Along with the Benjamin Franklin Bridge, which carried I-76 until 1972, and has carried I-676 since, the Betsy Ross Bridge, Delaware Memorial Bridge, Commodore Barry Bridge, and Delaware River–Turnpike Toll Bridge, the Walt Whitman Bridge is one of six expressway-standard bridges connecting the Philadelphia area with Southern New Jersey.

== Design and construction ==
The bridge was designed by noted civil engineer Othmar Ammann, responsible for a number of historic bridges in the New York City metropolitan area. Construction began in 1953, and it opened to traffic on May 16, 1957.

The bridge's construction incorporated approximately 57,674 tons of structural steel. Its main piers used caisson foundations, while the approach piers used pile foundations. The bridge has a total length of 11,981 feet (3,652 m), and a main span of 2,000 feet (610 m). The bridge has seven lanes, three in each direction and a center lane that is shifted variably (via a zipper barrier) to accommodate heavy traffic.

The Walt Whitman statue by Jo Davidson was placed at the intersection of Broad Street and Packer Avenue, in Philadelphia near the approach to the Walt Whitman Bridge.

== Name ==
The controversy that surrounded the naming of the Walt Whitman Bridge has been documented in a series of letters from members of the public held in the Kislak Center of the University of Pennsylvania. The Center summarizes the controversy, saying, "The bridge was meant to be named after a person of note who had lived in New Jersey, but some area citizens opposed the name 'Walt Whitman Bridge'...Many objecting to the choice of his name for the bridge saw Whitman's work as sympathizing with communist ideals and criticized him for his egalitarian view of humanity."

== Tolls ==
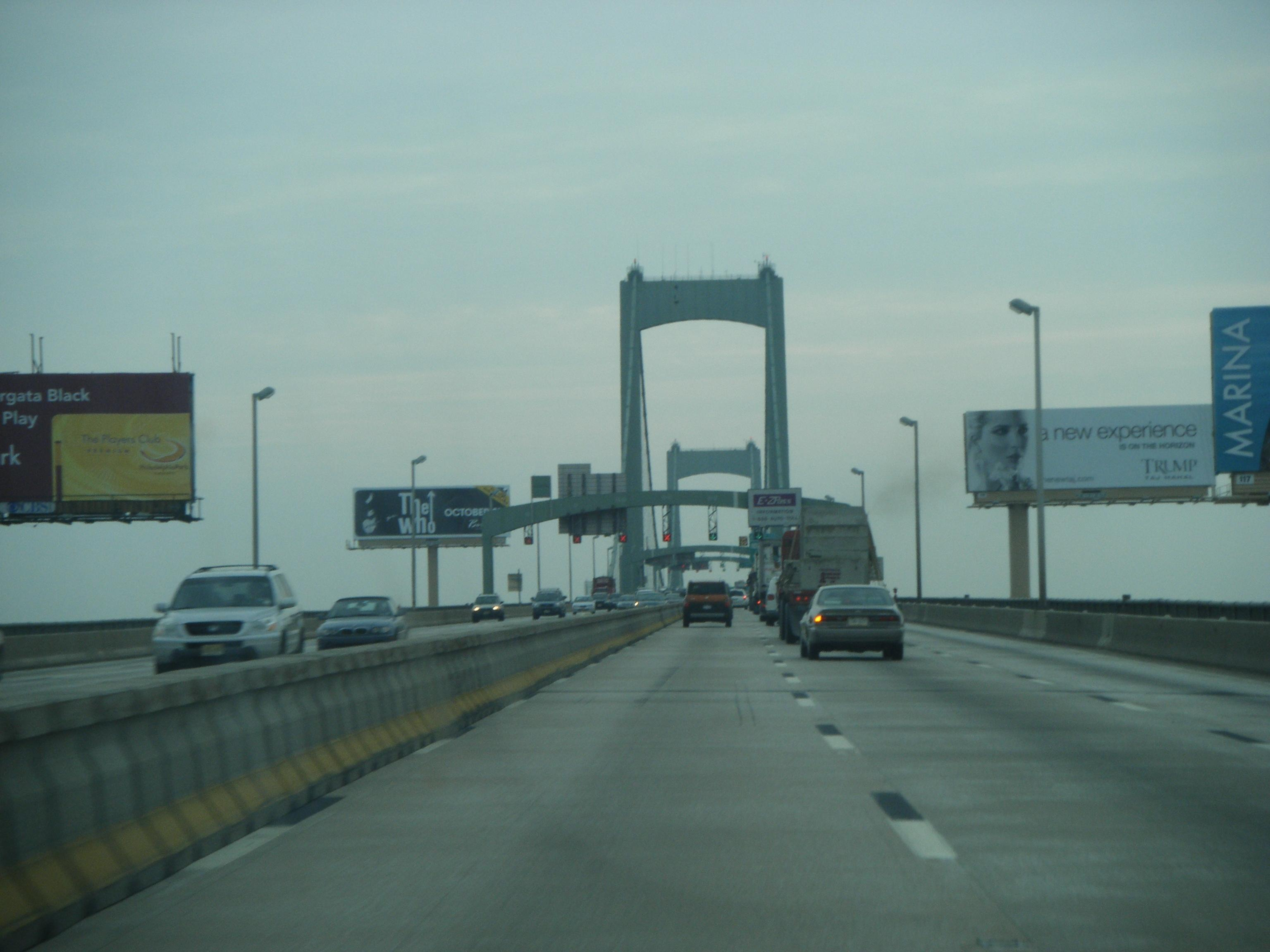
Walt Whitman Bridge eastbound, traveling from Philadelphia toward Gloucester City, New Jersey

A $6.00 one-way toll is charged to westbound passenger vehicles (less than or equal 7,000 lb (3,200 kg) gross vehicle weight) traveling from New Jersey to Pennsylvania. A $18 credit will be given on a per tag basis for any New Jersey-issued E-ZPass tag that crosses one of the four DRPA bridges 18 times in a calendar month. Trucks, commercial vehicles, mobile homes and recreation vehicles (weighing at least 7,001 lb (3,176 kg) gross vehicle weight) pay $9.00 per axle. Seniors aged 65 and over with an NJ E-ZPass can use a discount program to pay $3.00 per trip. There is no toll for eastbound vehicles traveling from Pennsylvania to New Jersey since 1992, when one-way tolls were instituted.

On July 17, 2024, the DRPA approved an increase in the toll for passenger vehicles from $5.00 to $6.00, which went into effect on September 1, 2024.

== Gallery ==
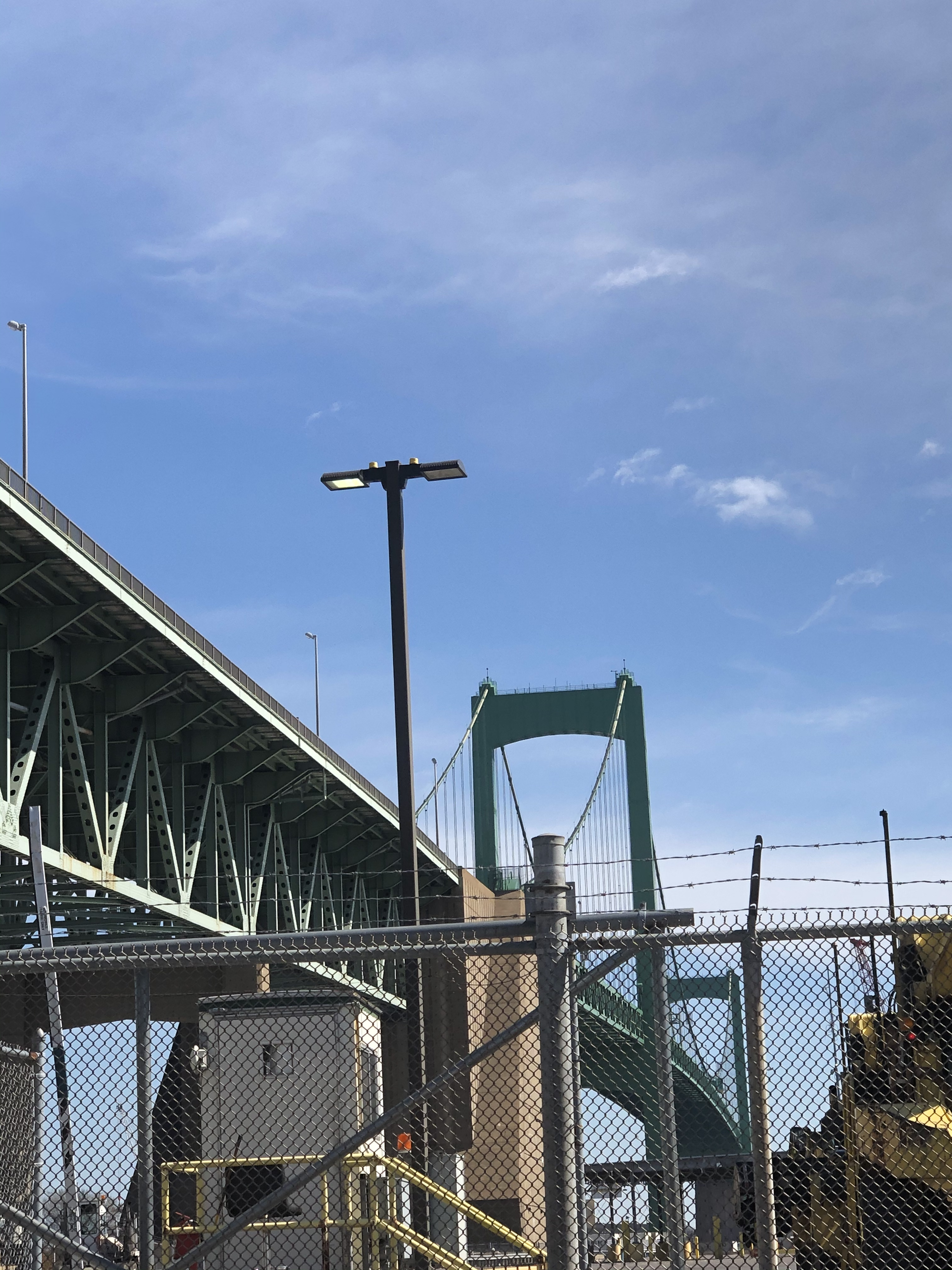
Walt Whitman Bridge south side

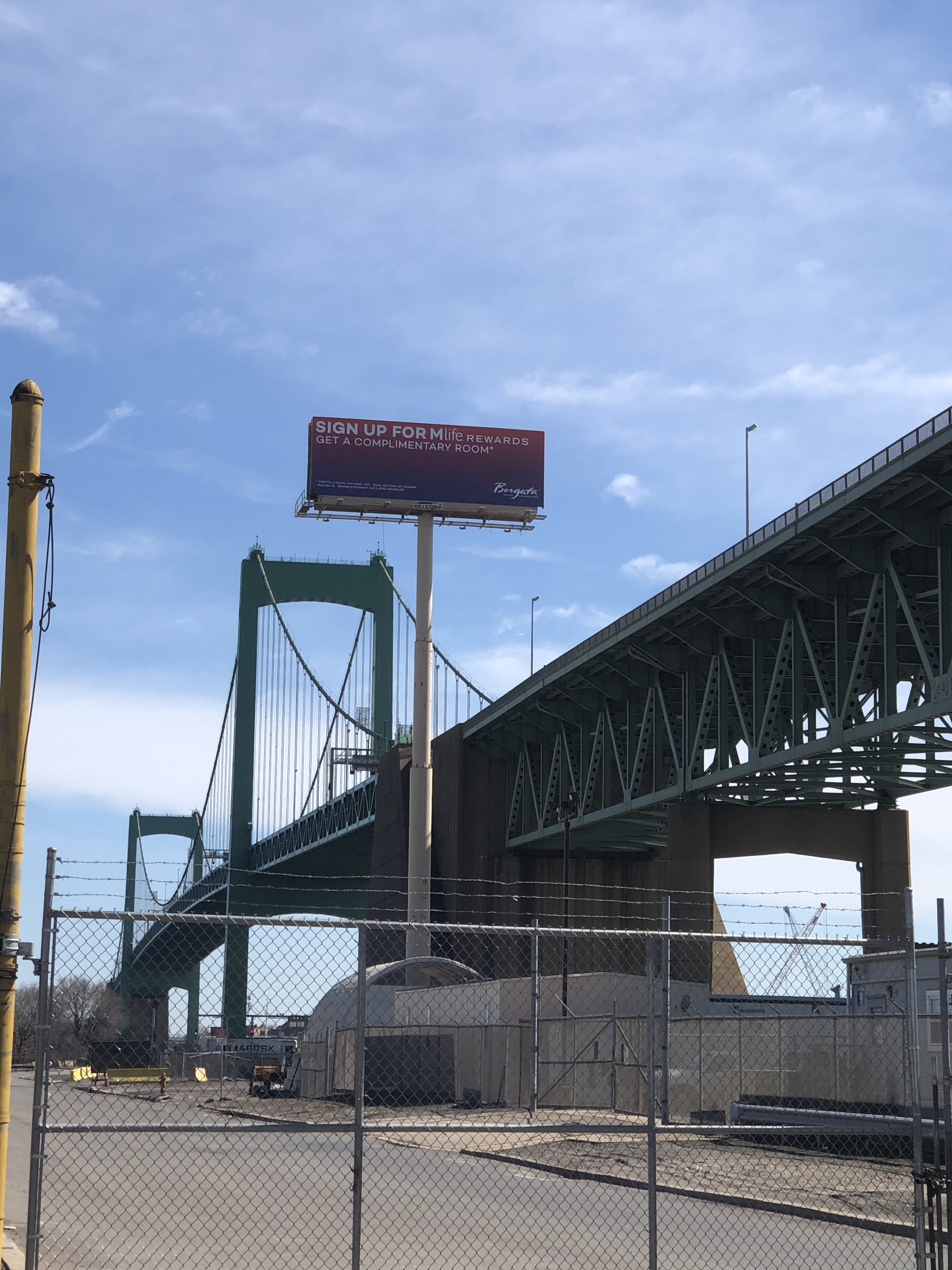
Walt Whitman Bridge north side

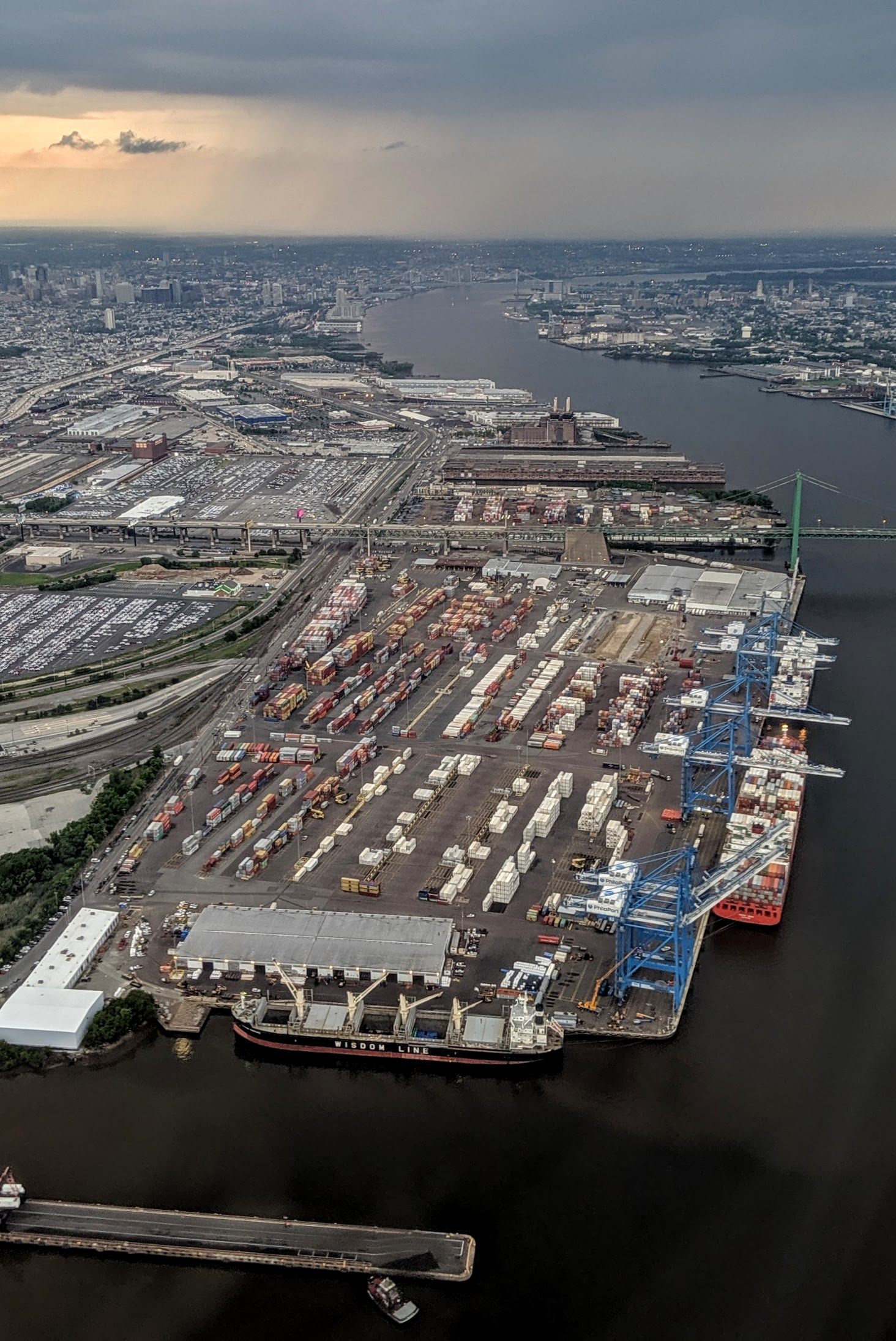
Packer Avenue Marine Terminal

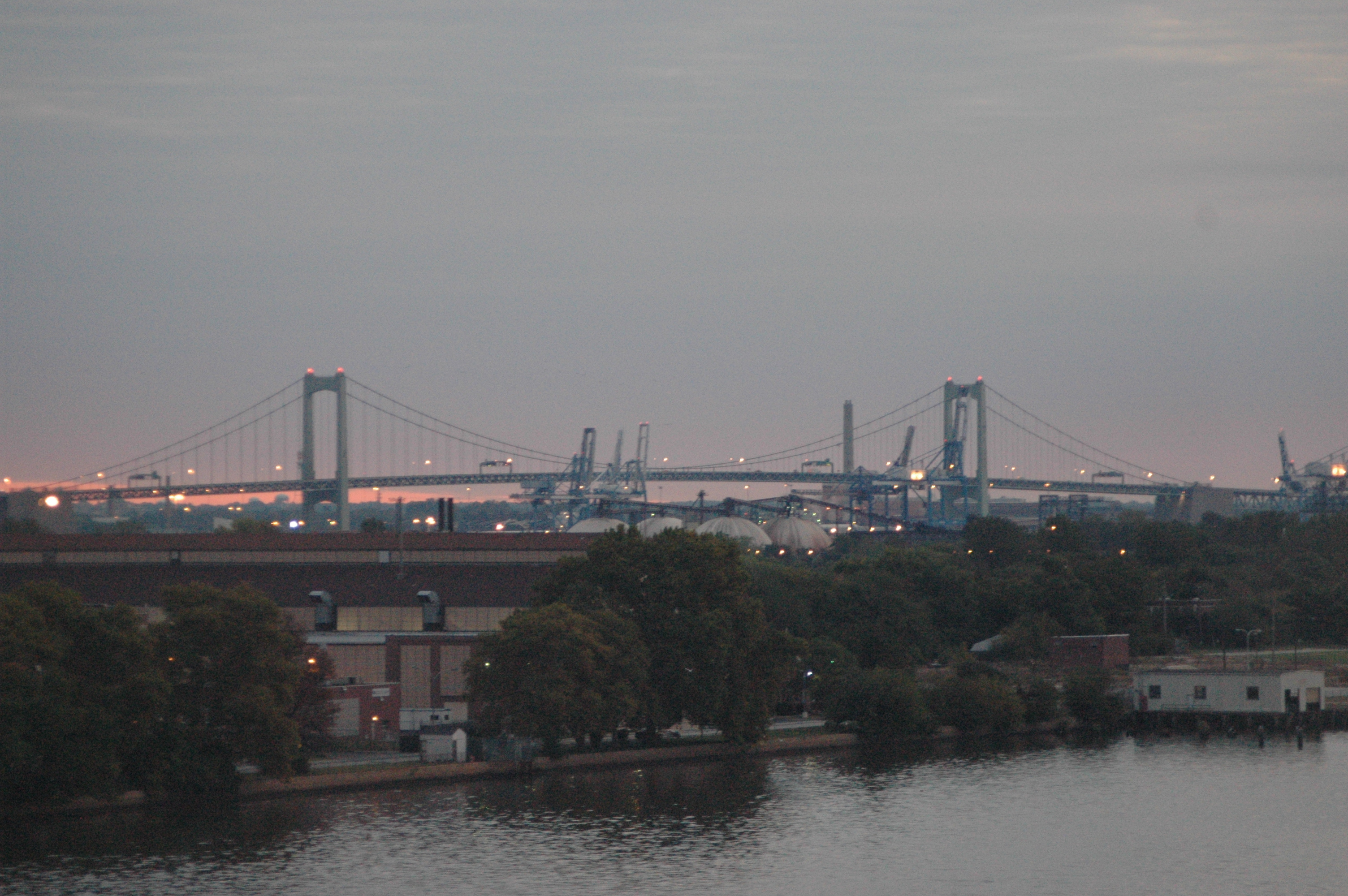
Night view

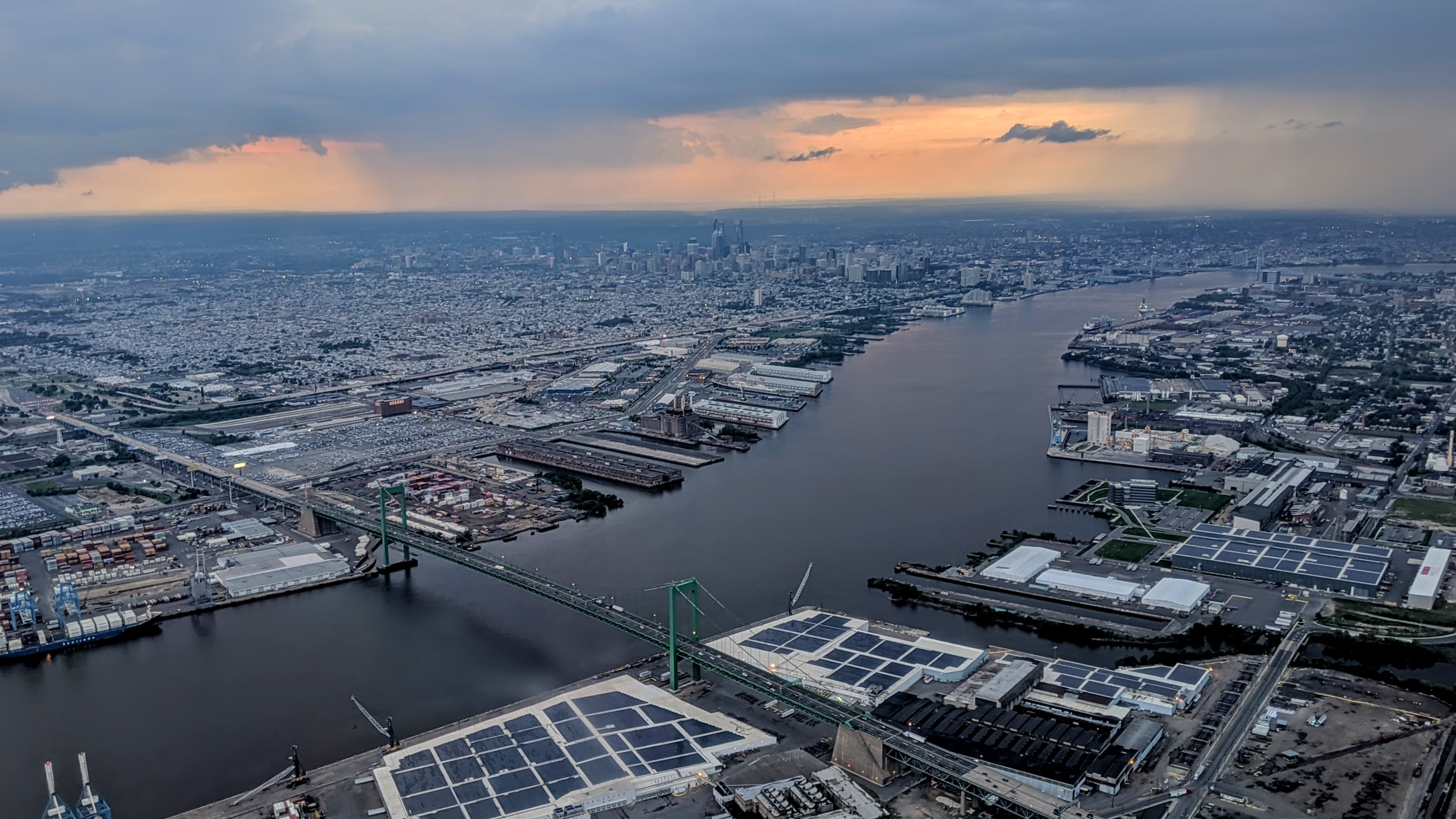
Aerial with Port of Camden at right

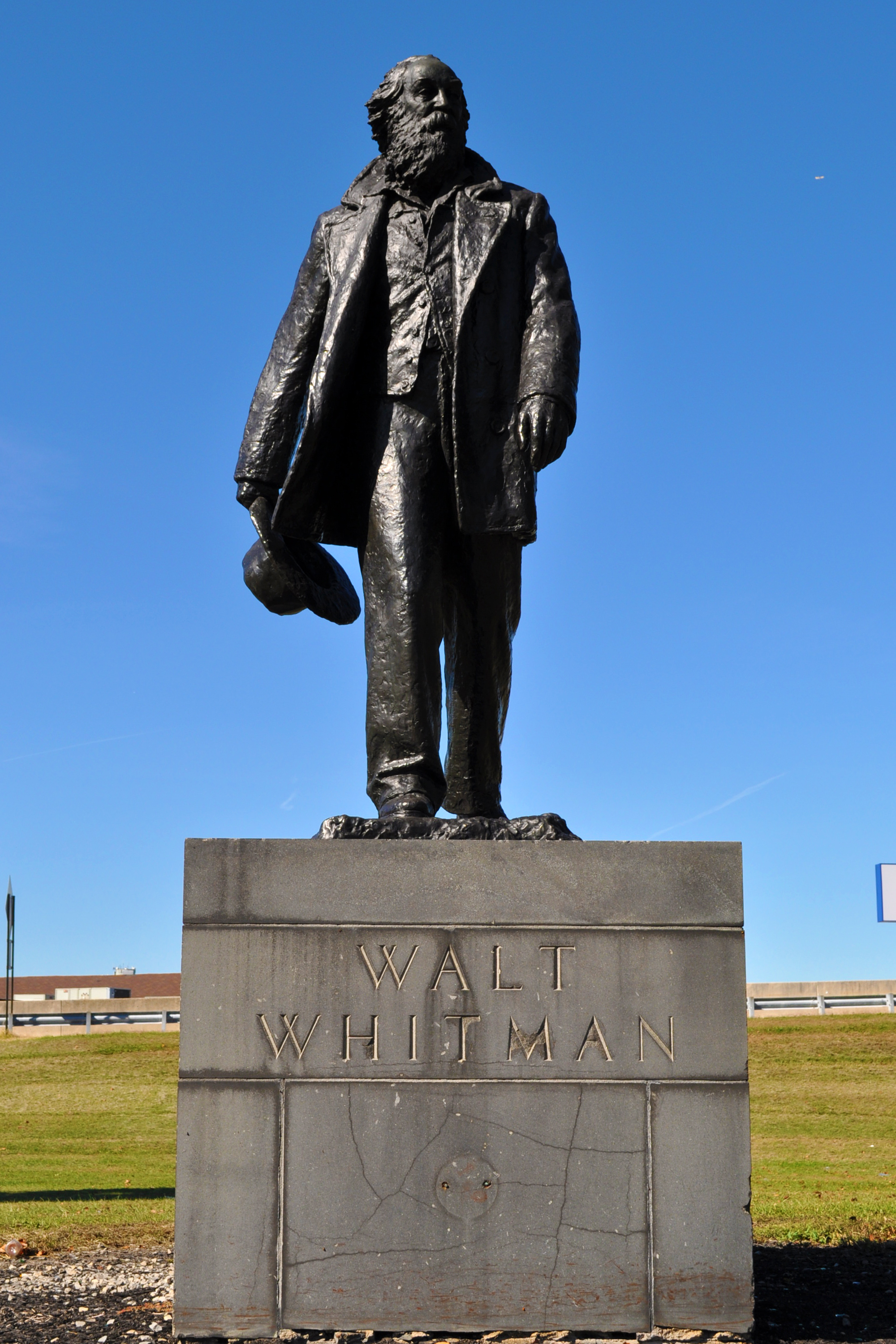
Walt Whitman monument at the bridge entrance

== See also ==
- List of crossings of the Delaware River
