= Brice M. Henry =

American politician

Brice M. Henry served as a member of the 1860–61 California State Assembly, representing the 2nd District.
