= Bill Rogers (musician) =

Guyanese singer and songwriter (1906–1984)

- Born: Augustus Hinds; 1906; Georgetown, Guyana, British Guiana
- Died: 1984 (aged 77–78) Guyana
- Genres: Shanto
- Occupations: Singer; songwriter
- Years active: 1920s–1970s
- Labels: Bluebird; Parlophone; Melodisc

Augustus Hinds (1906–1984), who performed under the stage name Bill Rogers, was a Guyanese singer and songwriter, credited with developing shanto music. He was the first Guyanese musician to record internationally.

== Biography ==
Born in 1906, he grew up in the multi-ethnic Charlestown area of south Georgetown, British Guiana. As a child, he joined in family shows put on by his sisters. He made his first stage appearance aged five, wrote his first songs at age 13, and then organised his own vaudeville-style group, the Merry Makers, who toured in Suriname. He made his first radio broadcasts in 1929 and also incorporated comedy and magic into his stage act. In the late 1920s, he developed the concept of shanto music, which he described as "an improvisation of words and music with an Afro-West Indian beat, with satirical comments on people, events and things". ("shanto" is a portmanteau of "shanty" – the term used in Guyana for work songs – and "calypso".) His songs were aimed at, and commented on issues relevant to the everyday lives of, the working-class urban population of Guyana.

In 1934, he sailed to the United States. In Camden, New Jersey, Rogers recorded 34 songs for the Bluebird Records (of RCA), backed by Felix's Krazy Kats, a group led by Puerto Rican musician Gregory Felix, who had been a member of James Reese Europe's band. The songs included "B. G. Bargee" ("bargee" or "bhagee" being a type of dance rhythm); "The West Indian Weed Woman" (also known as "The Weed Song"; later recorded by Harry Belafonte), describing the use of local plants in medicine and cooking; and "Sugar, Cent a Pound", about sugar salvaged from a local shipwreck. According to the Bloomsbury Encyclopedia of Popular Music, Rogers's recordings in 1934 "represent an incisive reflection on the issues that dominated Guyanese society during the late 1920s and early 1930s".

During the 1930s, Rogers toured widely in the Guianas, Trinidad, Barbados, the US and Canada. His performances and musical styles were influential, and in 1937, he won the Trinidad calypso crown, becoming the first Guyanese to do so. He promoted his own shows, as well as "Baby Shows" and Scholarship Fairs, which aimed to give a higher standard of education to disadvantaged children by sending them abroad to study medicine and other disciplines.

Rogers continued to perform and tour. In 1952, he visited Britain and recorded two sessions in London with producer Denis Preston, one for Parlophone and one for Melodisc, reprising some of his most popular songs. Melodisc released the song "Nice Woman, Ugly Man", on which he was backed by musicians including Freddy Grant and Mike McKenzie, as a single in the UK. He made further recordings in Jamaica with Louise Bennett, and again in Guyana in 1972.

Rogers died in Guyana in 1984. His son, Roger Hinds, performs and records shanto music under the name "Young Bill Rogers".
