= William H. Peterson (politician) =

American politician

William H. Peterson served as a member of the 1865–1867 California State Assembly, representing the 2nd District.
