= Willie Rogers (footballer, born 1919) =

English footballer

Willie Rogers (3 July 1919 – 8 February 1974) was an English professional footballer who played as a winger for Blackburn Rovers and Barrow.
