= J. Milton Williams =

American politician

J. Milton Williams (fl. 1860–1861) was an American politician who served as a member of the 1860–1861 California State Assembly, representing the 4th District.
