= James C. Pemberton =

American politician

James C. Pemberton was an American politician. He served as a member of the 1862–1863 California State Assembly, representing the 4th District.
