= D. B. Bailey =

American politician

Doctor Bowling Bailey (April 1, 1831 in Kentucky – September 9, 1888 in Mountain View, California) served as a member of the 1860-1861 California State Assembly, representing the 4th District.
