= Bill Rogers (educationalist) =

Australian teacher and educational consultant

Dr Bill Rogers (born 1947) is an Education consultant. He is the founder of the Rogers Education Consultancy.

== Career ==
A teacher by profession, Rogers now works as an educational consultant at all levels of education - primary, post-primary and tertiary.

He has also worked with other consultancies to provide in-services, lecture-programs and in-school workshops with teachers throughout Australia, the United Kingdom, Europe and Asia.

He has written several books about education for SAGE Publications, ACER and Scholastic Australia.

In particular, he has provided guidance on dealing with disruptive and challenging behaviour in classrooms.

== Academic honours ==
Rogers is a Fellow of the Australian College of Education, an Honorary Life Fellow at Leeds Trinity and an Honorary Fellow at the Melbourne University Graduate School of Education.
