= Statue of Will Rogers =

Statue by Jo Davidson

Will Rogers
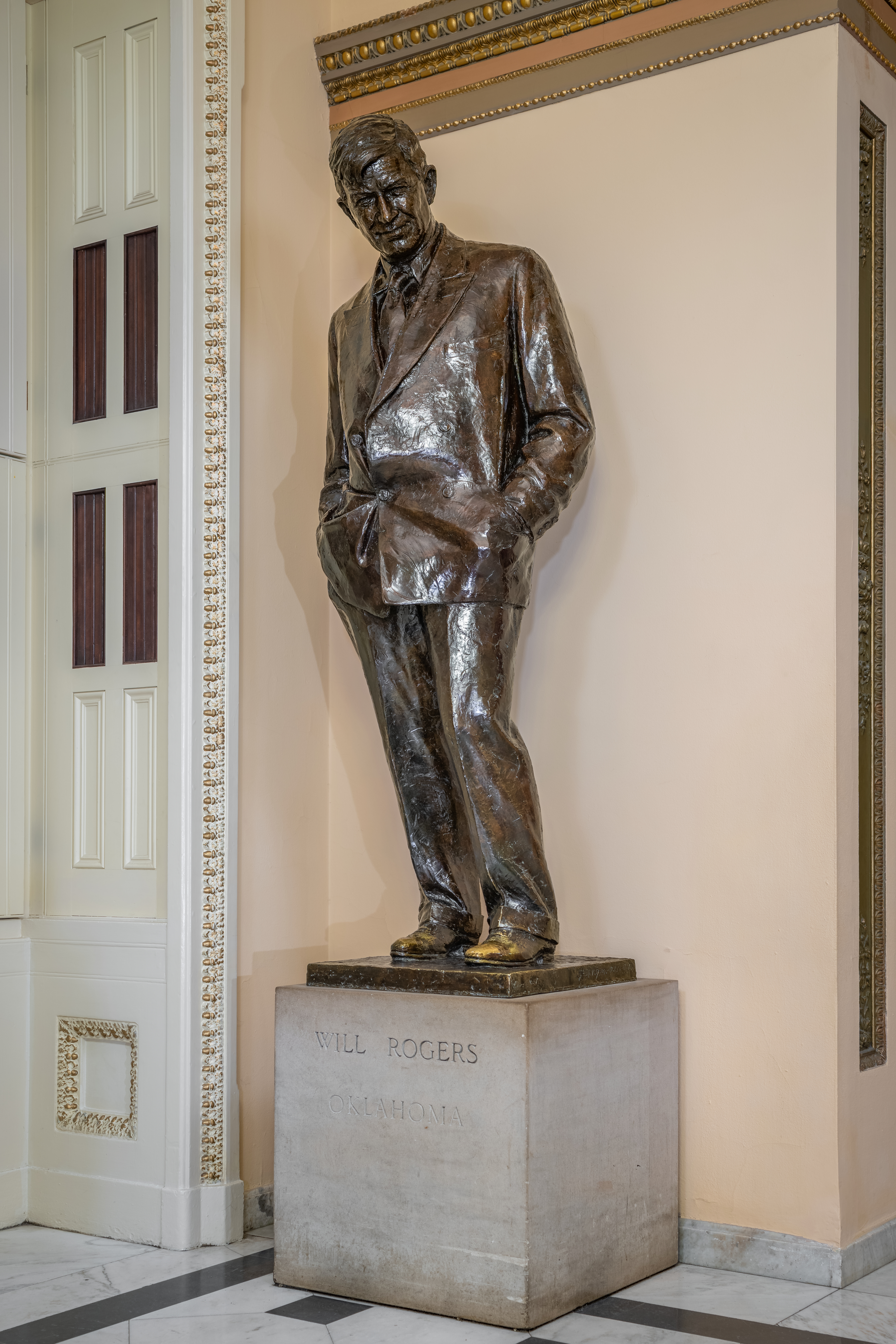
- The statue in the U.S. Capitol in 2023
- Artist: Jo Davidson
- Year: 1938
- Subject: Will Rogers
- Location: National Statuary Hall Collection, Washington, D.C.

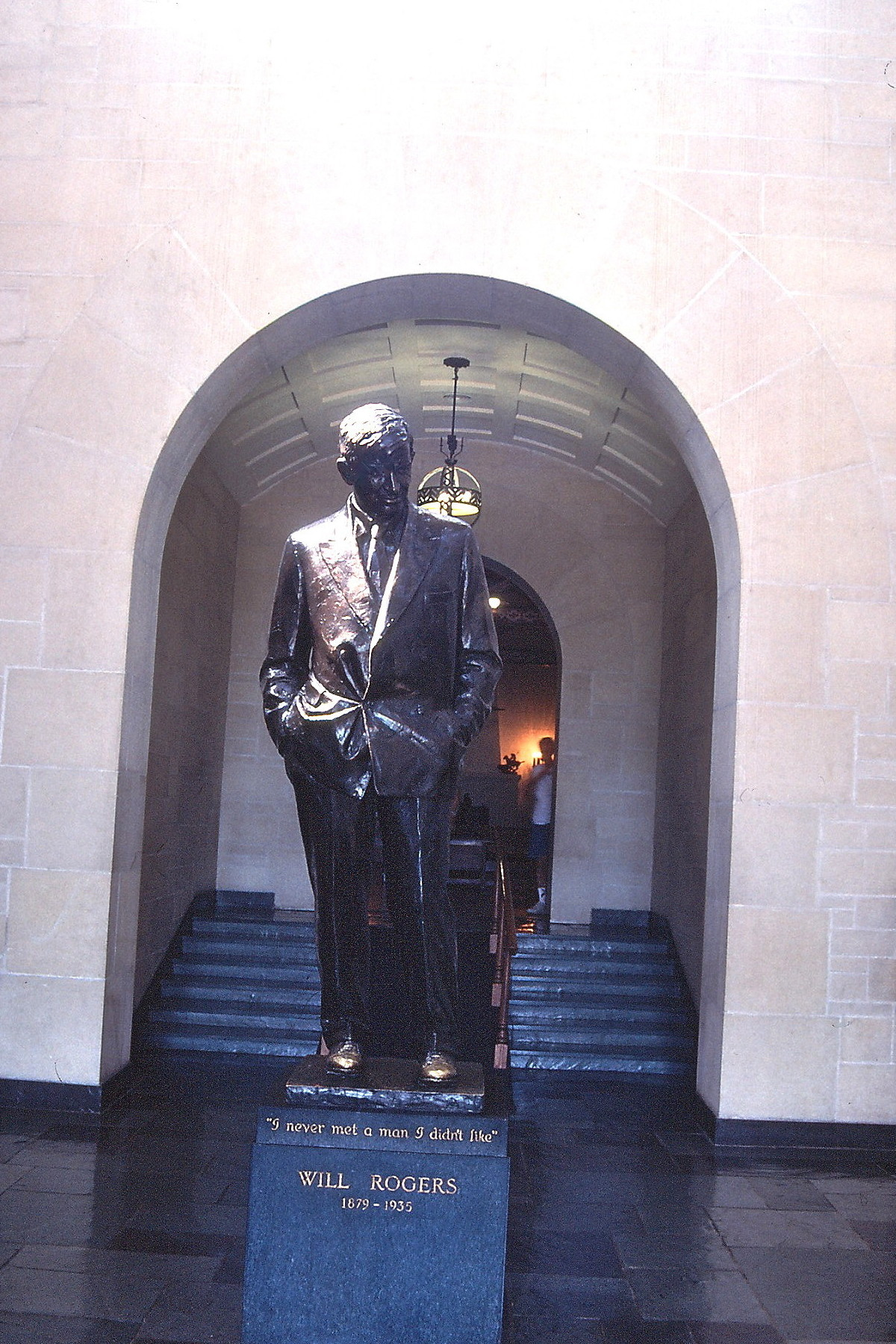
Statue in Claremore, Oklahoma

Will Rogers is a statue created by Jo Davidson, two versions of which were unveiled in 1938.

== Background and history ==
Shortly after entertainer and social commentator Will Rogers was killed in an airplane crash on August 15, 1935, the state of Oklahoma passed a bill to authorize that its second statue for the National Statuary Hall Collection in the U.S. Capitol building in Washington, D.C. be one of Will Rogers. On the recommendation of Betty Rogers, Will Rogers's wife, the sculptor Jo Davidson was awarded the commission.

Davidson and Rogers had known each other for a number of years, during which time Davidson had frequently attempted to convince Rogers to pose for him, and Rogers had always put it off, referring to Davidson as “you old head-hunter.” Davidson prepared for the commission by requesting Fox Films, for whom Rogers had made many films, (Rogers had acted in dozens of movies, 50 silent and 21 sound) to loan him films that he then screened in his Paris studio, where Davidson “worked, talked and lived nothing but Will Rogers”. He next procured the service of a model built roughly like Rogers and modeled him in clay, nude. He then asked Mrs. Rogers to send him some of Rogers worn clothes, which “still contained his personality,” which she did, and they were modeled on the nude clay. When he had completed the life-sized clay model, he made a plaster cast and sent it to the Valsuani foundry in Paris, where two casts were made, one for the National Statuary Hall Collection and the other for the Will Rogers Memorial, then recently opened in Claremore, Oklahoma, near Rogers birthplace. When that statue was unveiled, president Franklin Delano Roosevelt broadcast a message live on coast-to-coast radio from his home in Hyde Park.

The plaster cast was returned to the US and donated to the Will Rogers Memorial Fund, a charity established by the movie industry as a tribute to Will Rogers, in 1936. The WRMF was an eventual replacement for the National Vaudeville Artist Fund, which operated social assistance programs and a hospital for vaudevillians suffering from tuberculosis. The hospital was in Saranac Lake, New York and often referred to as the NVA Lodge. As a result of an agreement between vaudeville producers and movie moguls, the hospital name was changed to the Will Rogers Memorial Hospital, where the plaster cast was on display until the hospital closed in 1974. After the hospital closed, a research and teaching lab was established, called the Will Rogers Institute, at Burke Rehabilitation Hospital, in White Plains, New York, where the cast was on display until it was moved to Los Angeles in 1997. The plaster cast was restored in 2004 by Irena Calinescu, Objects Conservator, and is among the secure holdings of the Will Rogers Motion Picture Pioneers Foundation, the new name of WRMF, as of 2002.

The Washington, D.C. version of the statue was unveiled in 1939. At that unveiling on June 6, Senator Joshua B. Lee said of Rogers's effect on the United States during the Depression, “His humor was the safety valve for American Life.”

== See also ==
- 1939 in art
