= James Springer =

American politician

James P. Springer served as a member of the 1859–1860 California State Assembly, representing the 3rd District.
