= Francis F. Fargo =

American politician

Francis F. Fargo was an American politician. He served as a member of the 1861-1862 California State Assembly, representing the 4th District.
