= William Hazen Rogers =

American silversmith

William Hazen Rogers (born May 13, 1801) was an American master silversmith and a pioneer in the silver-plate industry and whose work and name have survived to the present day.

Rogers – together with his two brothers and, later, his son – was responsible for more than 100 patterns of silver and silver-plated cutlery and serving dishes.

Many of Roger's designs were influenced by Louis XIV-style patterns of the 17th and 18th century in France, and he was best known for his Elberon pattern and "Presidential" cutlery series.

Rogers partnered with other silversmiths at times, and his company and trademarks were eventually taken over by larger companies.

== Early life ==
Rogers was born on a farm on May 13, 1801, to Sarah Reynolds Rogers (born 1777; date of death unknown) and Asa Rogers (born 1756; died 1824 in Hartford, Connecticut).

== Career ==
After he left home, he went on to become a silversmith, watchmaker and jeweler. From 1820 to 1825, Rogers was an apprentice to Joseph Church, a silversmith and watchmaker in Hartford. (Church subsequently also became an official and a director of The Aetna Life Insurance Company).

In 1825, Rogers became partners with Church and their company, Church & Rogers, initially manufactured silver-plate flatware and hollowware.

He was also partner, from 1832 to 1838, with Asa Harris Rogers, his younger brother, as "A. Rogers Jr. & Co." while still associated with Church & Rogers.

== See also ==
- List of people from Connecticut
