= William P. Rodgers =

American politician

William P. Rodgers served as a member of the 1859–1860 California State Assembly, representing the 3rd District.
