= Will Rogers (trade unionist) =

British trade unionist

William John Rogers (died April 1952), often known as Will Rogers, was a British trade unionist and political activist.

In 1890, Rogers founded the Clerks' Union, which later became a major trade union. He became active in the Labour Party and stood in Daventry at the 1918 and 1922 United Kingdom general elections, taking second place and around 40% of the vote on each occasion.
