= R. P. Mace =

American politician

Russell Perry Mace (May 14, 1820 in Boston, Massachusetts – April 24, 1894 in Madera, California) served as a member of the 1865–1869 California State Assembly, representing the 4th District. Mace was a veteran of the Mexican–American War and later moved to California during the California Gold Rush.
