= Will Rogers (Maine politician) =

American politician

Member of the 121st Maine State Legislature
- In office 2002–2004
- Succeeded by: Charles D. (Dusty) Fisher

Personal details
- Born: William Thomas Rogers Jr. March 17, 1938 (age 88) Boston, Massachusetts, U.S.
- Party: Republican
- Spouse: Lee Rogers (m. 1961)
- Children: 3
- Occupation: Real Estate Broker

William Thomas Rogers Jr. (born March 17, 1938) is an American realtor and politician from Maine. He was elected to the 121st Maine State Legislature. He also ran for the Maine House of Representatives again in 2012.

Affiliations

Rogers is affiliated with the following organizations:

- "M" Club University of Maine Board of Directors
- Maine Association of Realtors (State President 1997)
- State Realtor of the year 1988
- University of Maine Black Bear athletic advisors 1982–present
- Corporator in Bangor Savings Bank
- Bangor Salmon Club
- Penobscot County Conservation Association
- Hunter safety instructor (4,000 students)
- Member of the National Rifle Association
- U.S. Army, 101st Airborne division
- Chairman, Black Bear Club, University of Maine
