= Willie Rogers (Australian footballer) =

Australian rules footballer

Personal information
- Full name: William Rogers
- Born: 23 May 1883; Maryborough, Victoria
- Died: 8 August 1956 (aged 73); Geelong, Victoria
- Original team: Bridgewater

Playing career^{1}
Years	Club	Games (Goals)
1906	Melbourne	8 (0)
- ^{1} Playing statistics correct to the end of 1906.

Willie Rogers (23 May 1883 – 8 August 1956) was an Australian rules footballer who played with Melbourne in the Victorian Football League (VFL).
