= Eimmart =

Eimmart may refer to:

- Eimmart (crater), a lunar crater
- Georg Christoph Eimmart (1638–1705), German draughtsman and engraver
- Maria Clara Eimmart (1676–1707), German astronomer, engraver, and designer
