= Dorsum Oppel =

Ridge in Mare Crisium on the Moon

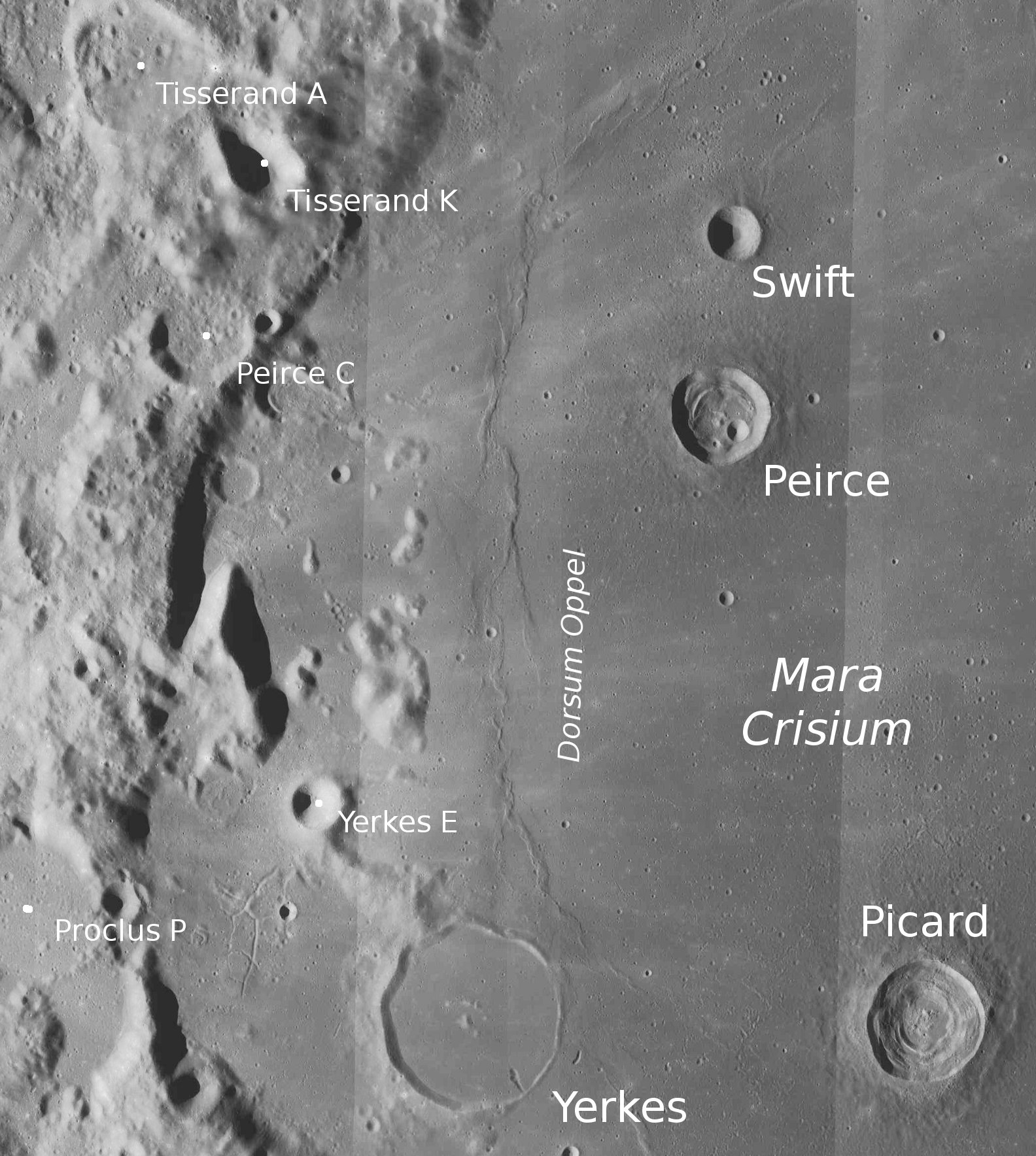
Dorsum Oppel and its surrounding craters

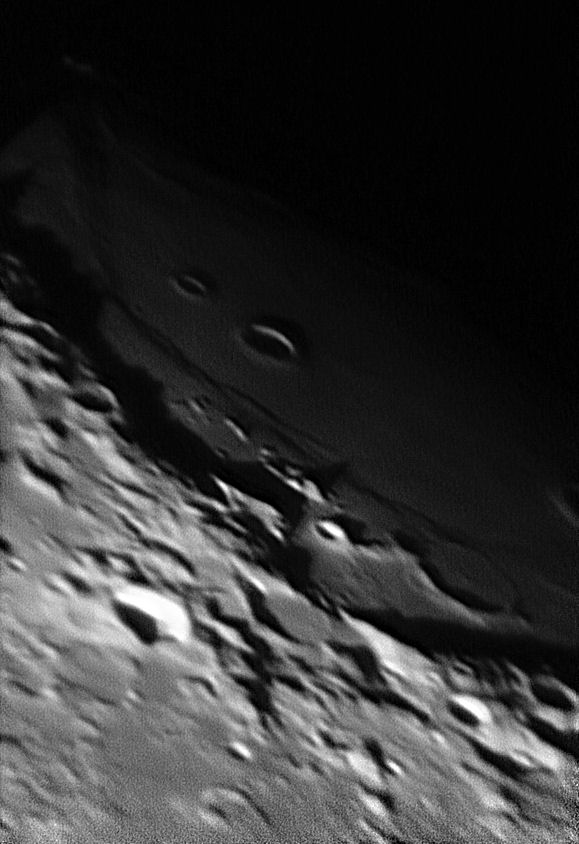
Dorsum Oppel

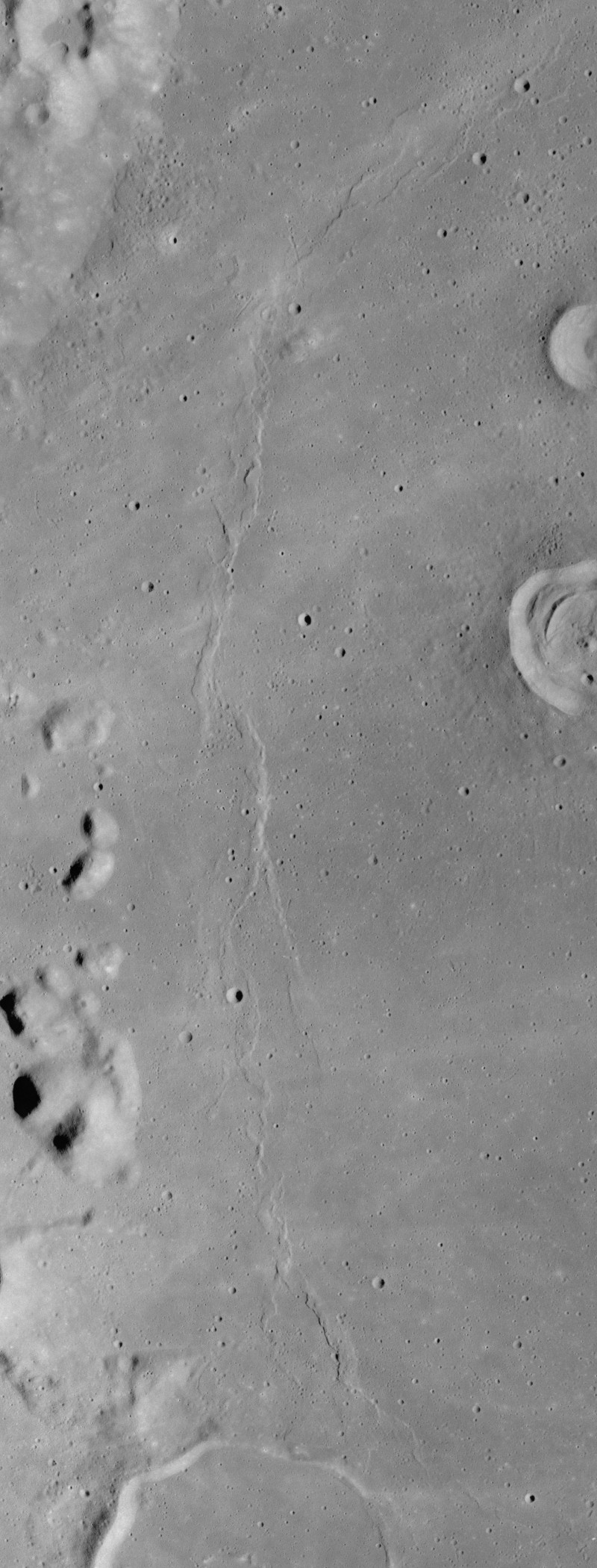
Apollo 17 image

Dorsum Oppel is a wrinkle ridge at 18.7°N 52.6°E in Mare Crisium on the Moon. It is 298 km (185 mi) long and was named after the German paleontologist Albert Oppel in 1976.

The ridge trends north from Yerkes crater. Peirce and Swift craters lie to the east of the Dorsum.
