= Greaves (crater) =

Lunar crater

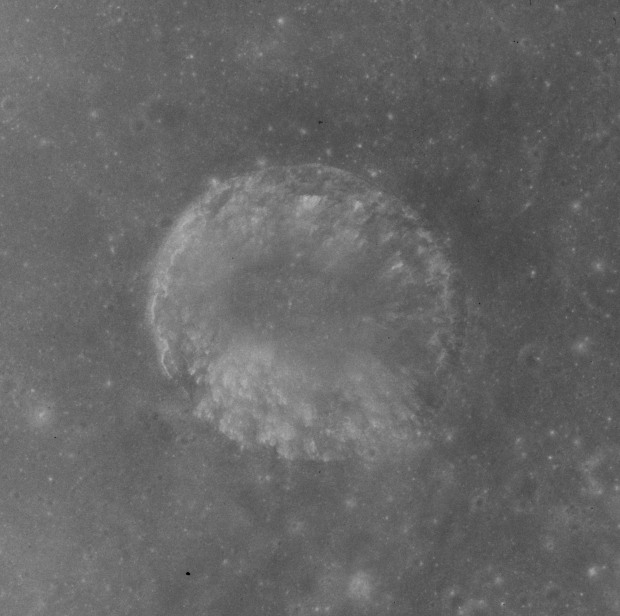
- Apollo 15 mapping camera image
- Coordinates: 13.2°N 52.7°E
- Diameter: 14 km
- Depth: 1.8 km
- Colongitude: 307° at sunrise
- Eponym: William M. H. Greaves

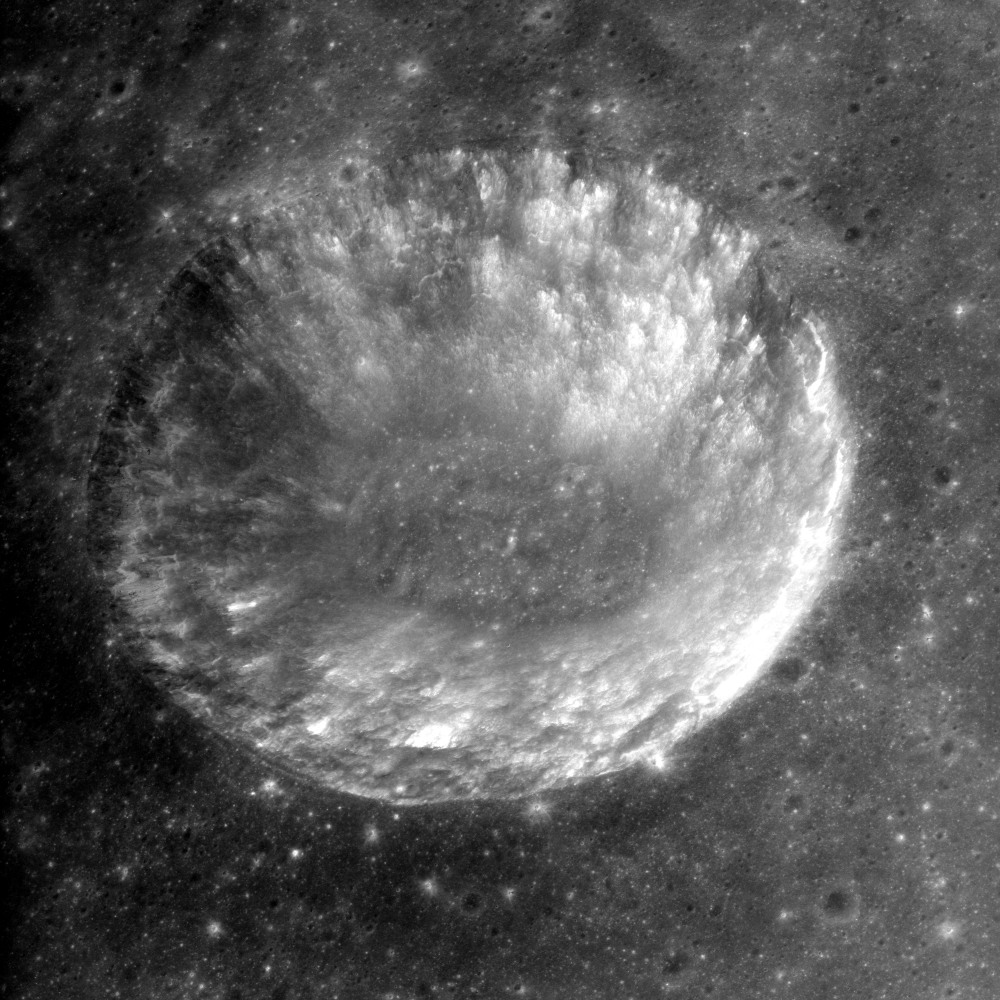
Oblique view from Apollo 17

Greaves is a small lunar impact crater that lies near the southwest edge of Mare Crisium. It is a circular, bowl-shaped formation with a small interior floor at the center of the sloping inner walls. The crater is intruding into the northern edge of the lava-flooded crater Lick. To the northwest is Yerkes, and to the northeast is Picard.

This formation was previously designated Lick D, a satellite crater of Lick, before it was given a name by the IAU.

== See also ==
- Asteroid 9899 Greaves
