= Peirce (crater) =

Crater on the Moon

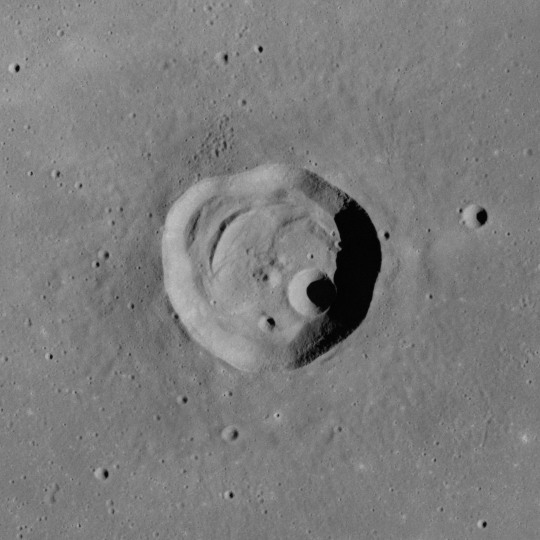
- Apollo 17 mapping camera image
- Coordinates: 18.26°N 53.35°E
- Diameter: 18.86 km (11.72 mi)
- Depth: 1.8 km (1.1 mi)
- Colongitude: 307° at sunrise
- Formation: Eratosthenian
- Eponym: Benjamin Peirce

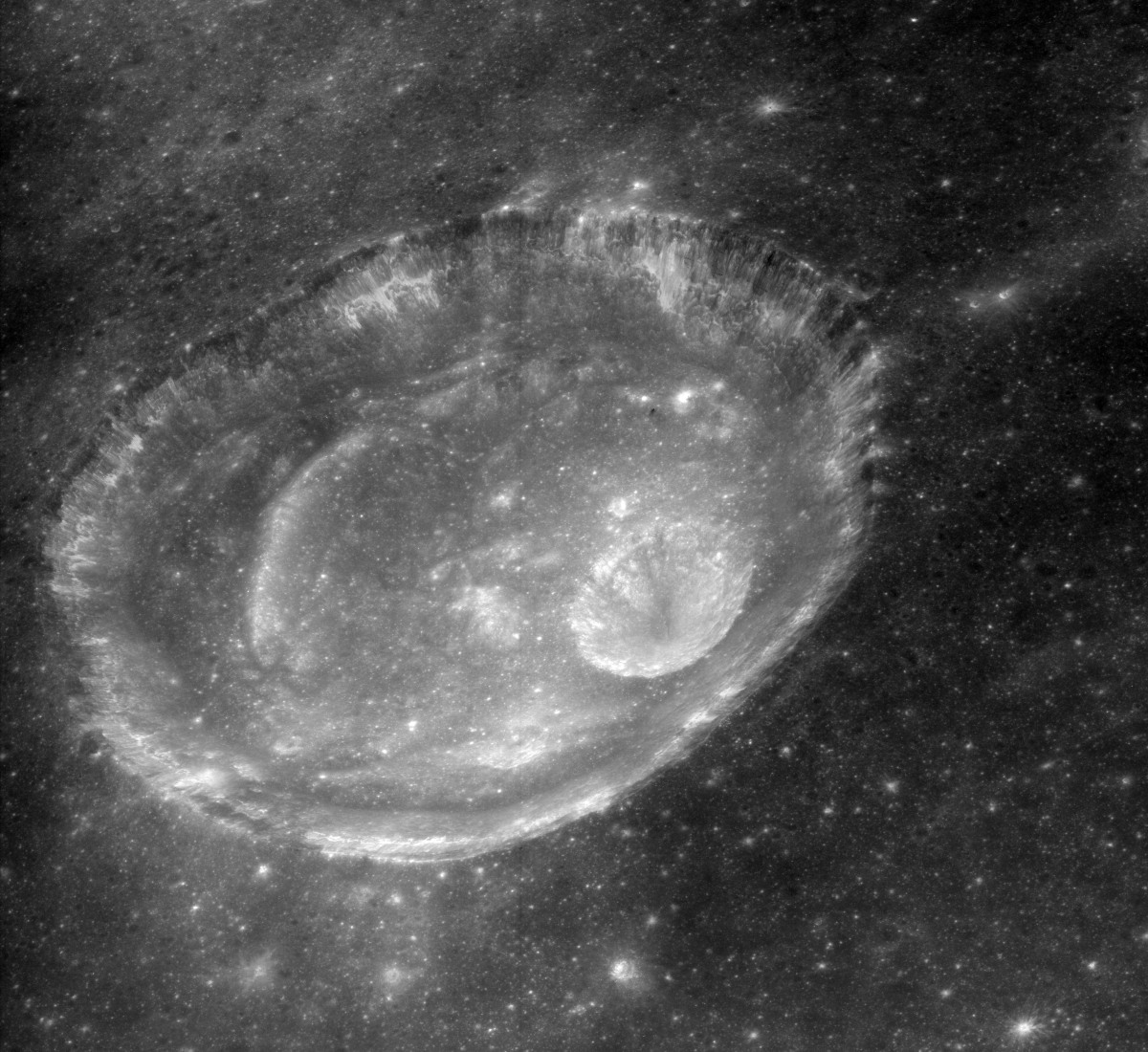
Oblique view from Apollo 17, facing north

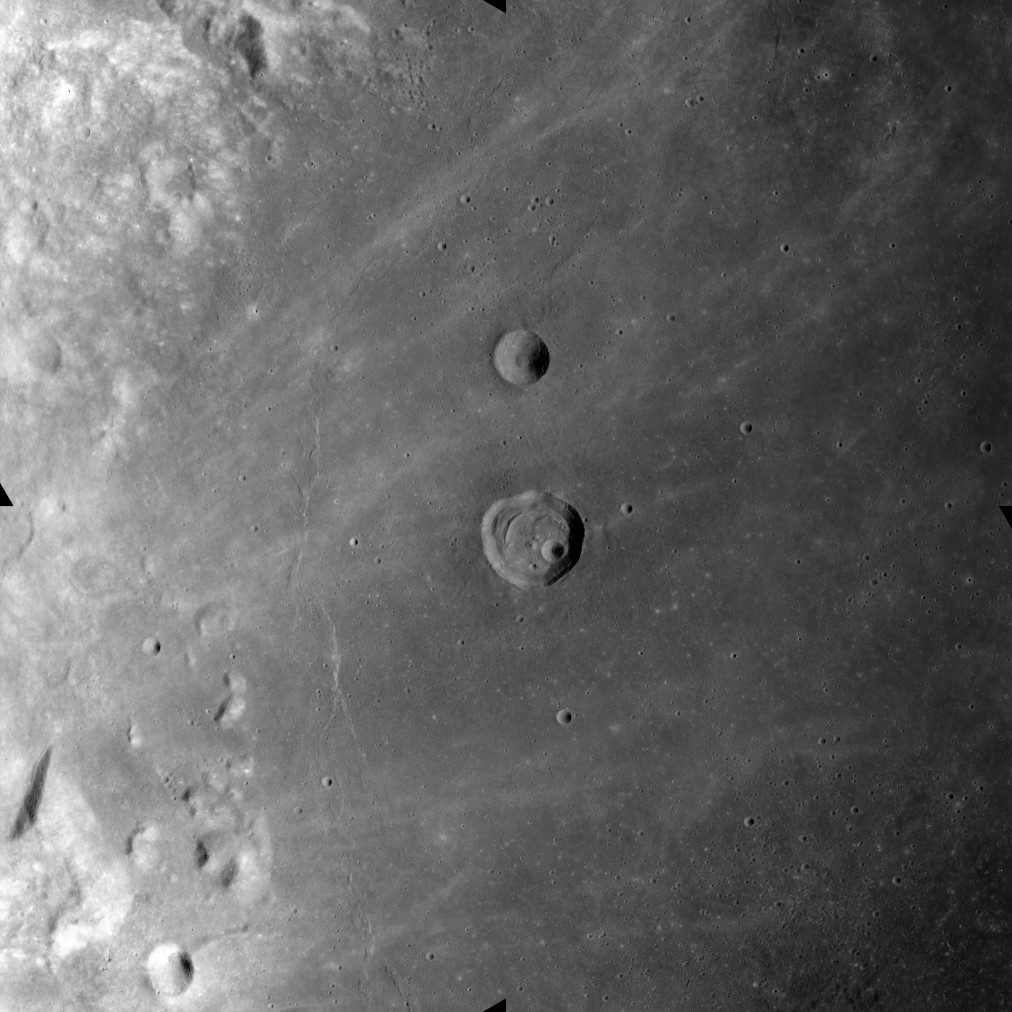
Peirce (center) and Swift (above center), from Apollo 17. The rays from the left are from Proclus. NASA photo.

Peirce is a small lunar impact crater in the western part of Mare Crisium. That dark, circular lunar mare is located in the east-northeasterly part of the Moon's near side. It was named after the American mathematician Benjamin Peirce. Peirce lies to the north of the craters Yerkes and Picard, and southeast of Macrobius located outside the mare. Just over a crater diameter to the north of Peirce is the smaller Swift. To the northwest is the wrinkle ridge Dorsum Oppel.

The rim of Peirce is roughly circular, with a slight outward bulge along the northwestern rim. There are indications of slumping along the sides of this section, producing a wider inner wall. It is generally bowl-shaped, and is marked only by a tiny craterlet along the inner southeast rim. The interior is marked by several furrows, ridges, as well as a low, conical hill near the midpoint.

Peirce is a crater of Eratosthenian age.

== Satellite craters ==
By convention these features are identified on lunar maps by placing the letter on the side of the crater midpoint that is closest to Peirce.

Peirce	Latitude	Longitude	Diameter
C	18.8° N	49.9° E	19 km

The following craters have been renamed by the IAU.

- Peirce B — See Swift (lunar crater).
