= Crisium =

Crisium may refer to:

- Mare Crisium, on the Moon
- Križevci, Croatia (Latin: Crisium)

== See also ==
- Chrism, consecrated oil
