= Pierre-Marie Termier =

French geologist

Pierre-Marie Termier (3 July 1859 – 23 October 1930) was a French geologist.

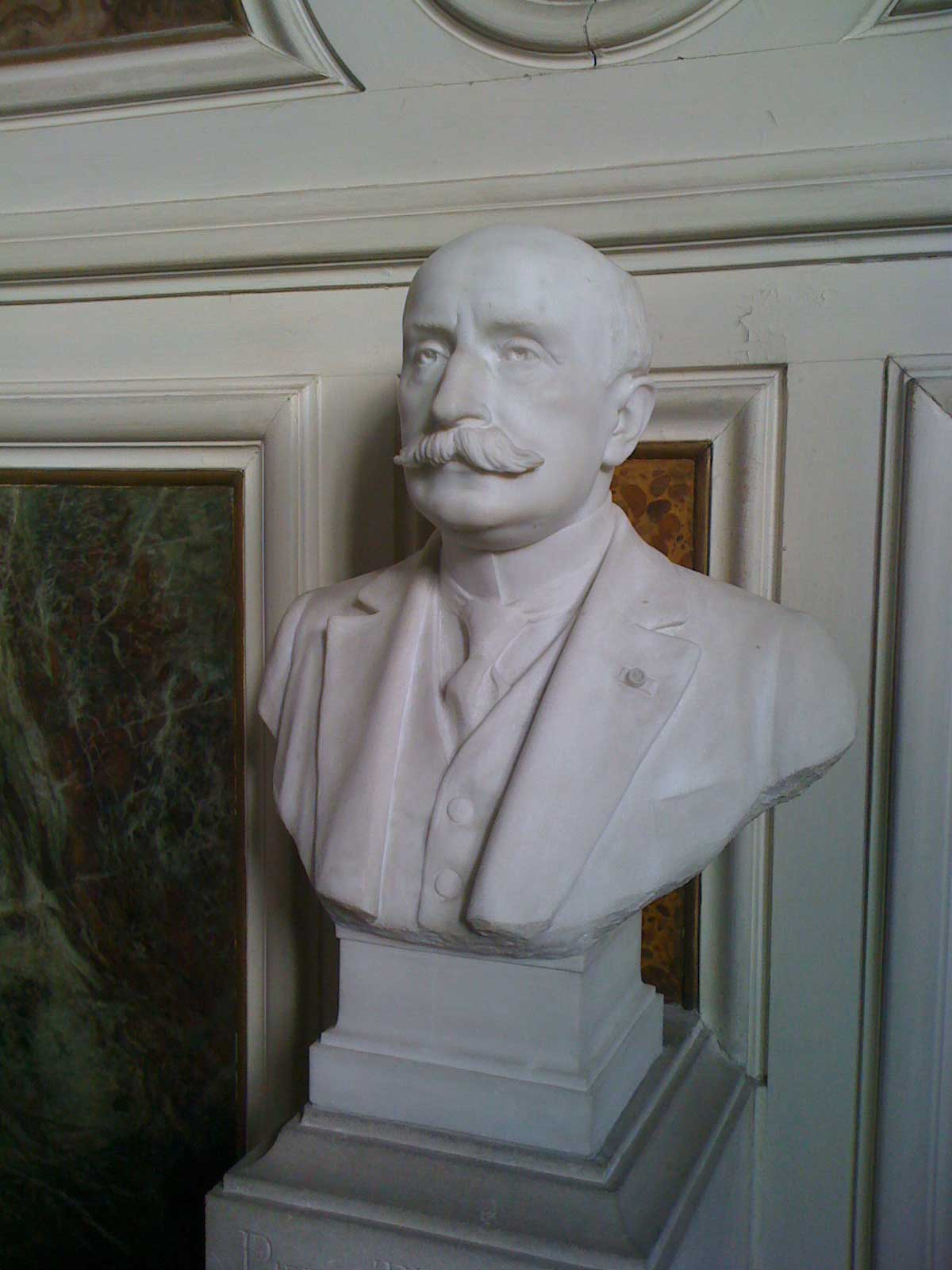
Bust of Pierre-Marie Termier

He was born in Lyon, in Rhône, France, the son of Joseph François Termier and Jeanne Mollard. At the age of 18 he entered the Polytechnic School, then the Paris School of Mines in 1880. After graduation, he became professor at the school of mines at Saint-Etienne. In 1894 he left for Paris, where he would teach for the remainder of his career.

He was elected as a member of the French Academy of Sciences in 1909, in the mineralogy section. Two years later he became the director of the French geological cartography service. In 1930 he became vice-president of the Academy.

During his career he performed geological studies of the Alps, as well as Corsica and North Africa. He was a proponent of the nappe concept and of tectonics as a mountain-building force.

The wrinkle ridge Dorsum Termier on the Moon is named after him.
