= Dorsa Tetyaev =

Wrinkle ridge system on the Moon

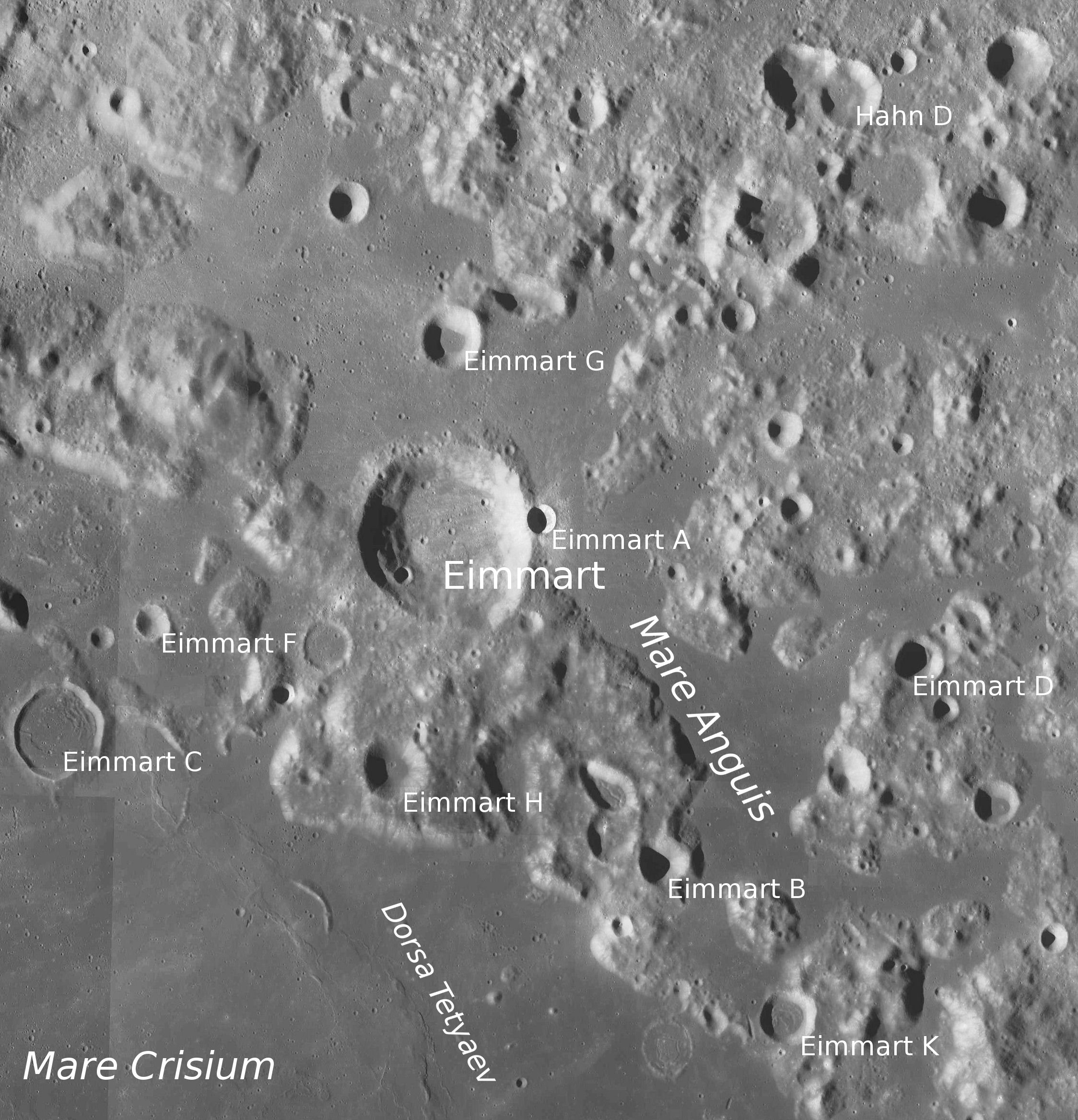
Part of Dorsa Tetyaev are in the bottom of the photo

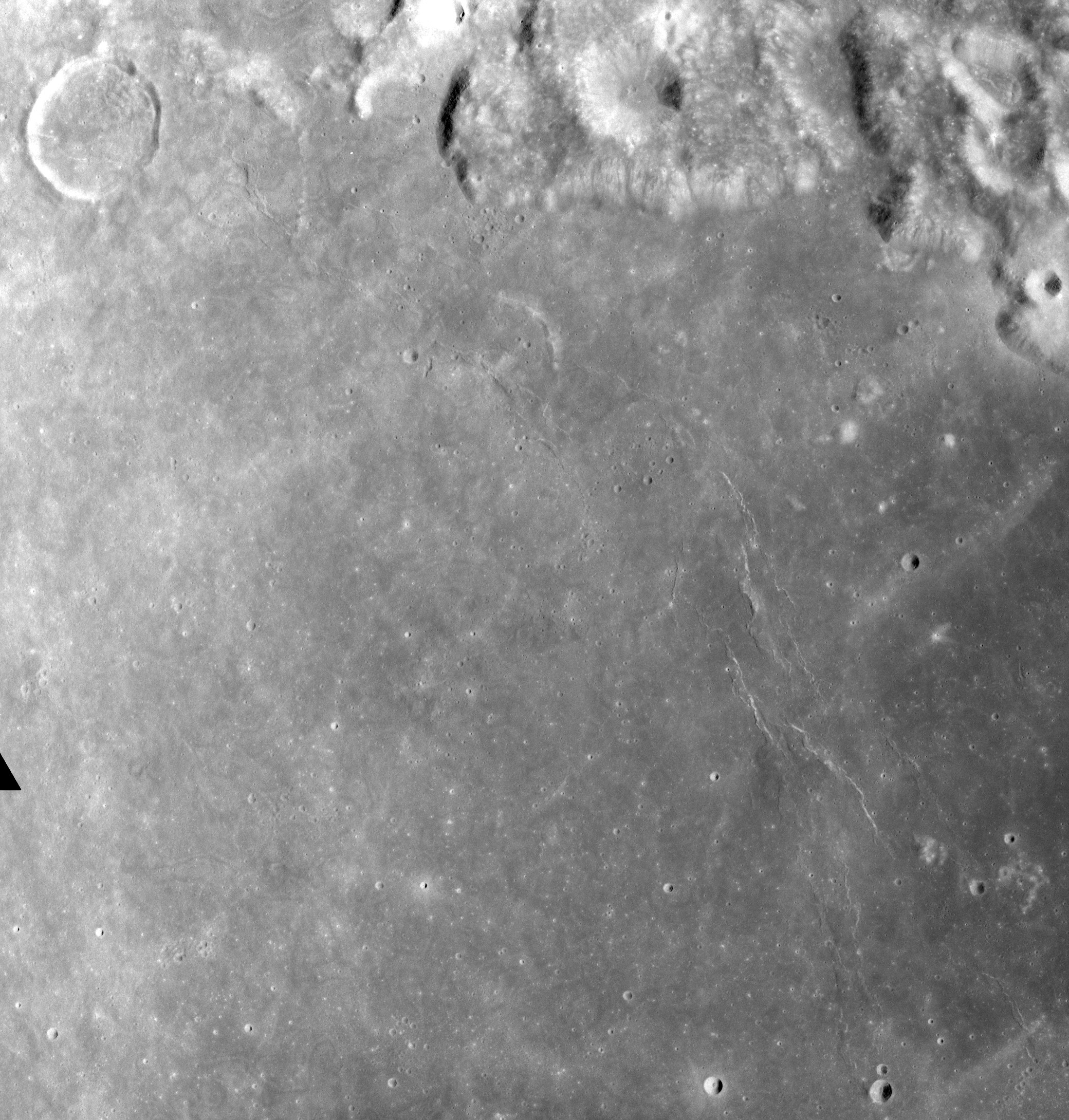
Dorsa Tetyaev in northeastern Mare Crisium

Dorsa Tetyaev is a wrinkle ridge system at 19.9°N 64.2°E in Mare Crisium on the Moon. It is 188 km long and was named after Soviet geologist Mikhail Mikhailovich Tetyaev in 1979.
