= Mare Anguis =

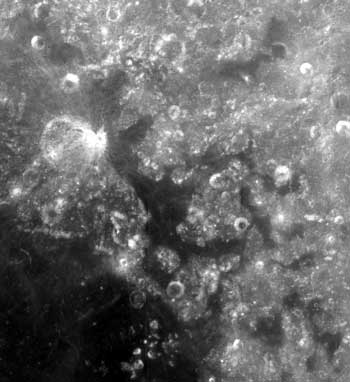
- Mare Anguis is the dark patch in the middle of this photo. The crater in the left center of the photo is Eimmart, and is at the northwestern tip of Mare Anguis. The dark patch in the lower left corner is the northeastern edge of Mare Crisium.
- Coordinates: 22.6°N 67.7°E
- Diameter: 146 km (91 mi)
- Eponym: Serpent Sea

Mare Anguis /ˈæŋɡwɪs/ (Latin anguis, the "serpent sea") is a lunar mare located on the near side of the Moon, about 150 kilometers in diameter. Located within the Crisium basin, Mare Anguis is a part of the Nectarian System, meaning that it was formed during the Nectarian time period. Like most mare, the surface of Mare Anguis is dark, indicating that it has been filled with volcanic basalt. It forms part of a concentric ring to the northeast of the Crisium rim, and it lies at an elevation 800 m above Mare Crisium. Channels lead down from Mare Anguis to Mare Chrisium, with some possible indications of lava flow.

The small, 7–km diameter crater Eimmart A lies at the east edge of Mare Anguis. It is a proposed source for the Antarctic meteorite ALHA81005. The impact appears to have excavated mare basalt, which probably accounts for the olivine/low-Ca pyroxene mixture found in the spectrum.

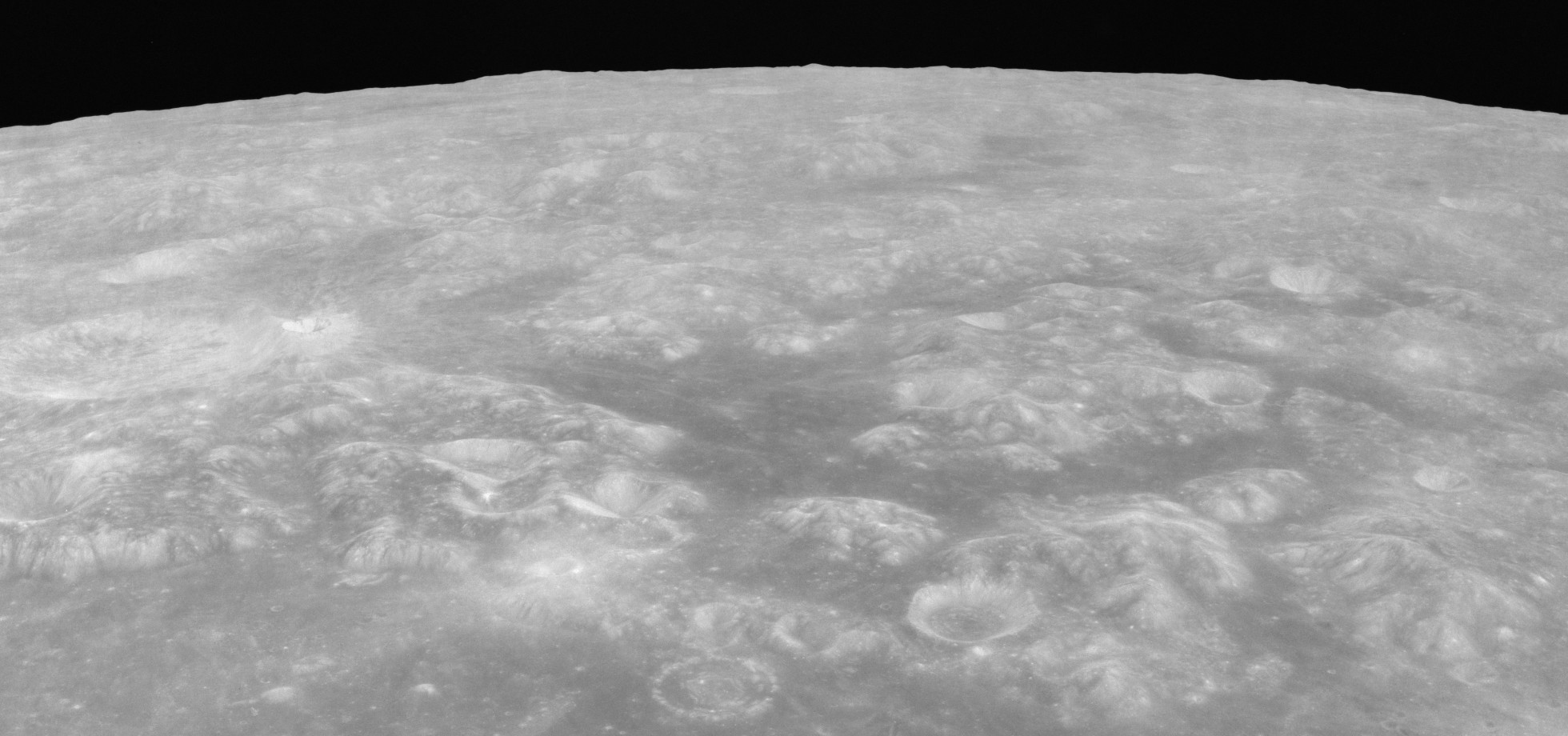
Oblique view of Mare Anguis from Apollo 17

== See also ==
- Volcanism on the Moon
