= Lick (crater) =

Crater on the Moon

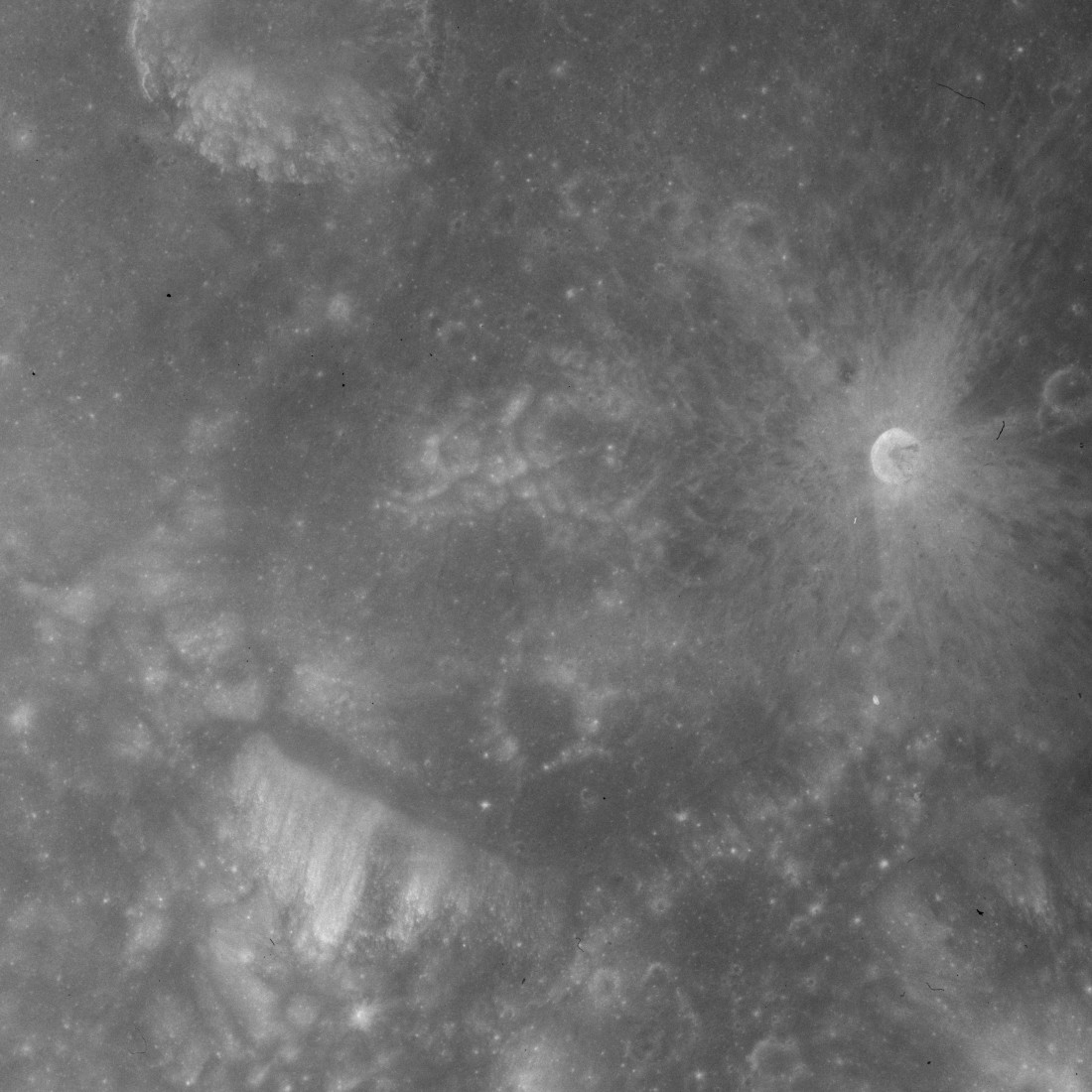
- Apollo 15 mapping camera image
- Coordinates: 12.4°N 52.7°E
- Diameter: 31 km
- Depth: 0.30 km
- Colongitude: 308° at sunrise
- Eponym: James Lick

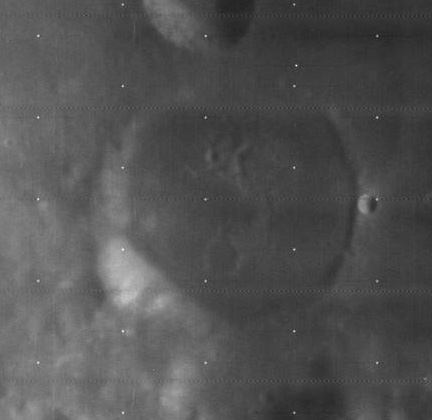
Lunar Orbiter 4 image

Lick is a lunar impact crater that has been flooded with basaltic lava. This crater was named in memory of James Lick, a Californian philanthropist. The north rim is attached to the smaller, bowl-shaped crater Greaves. Lick lies on the southwest edge of Mare Crisium. Its rim is broken at the north and south ends, and the southwest rim is attached to the crater remnant Lick A. There is a small, flooded crater within the southern part of Lick's inner floor, and several tiny craters mark the interior surface. A small, unnamed crater at the east rim has a bright ray system.

== Satellite craters ==
By convention these features are identified on lunar maps by placing the letter on the side of the crater midpoint that is closest to Lick.

Lick	Latitude	Longitude	Diameter
A	11.5° N	52.8° E	23 km
B	11.2° N	51.4° E	24 km
C	11.5° N	52.0° E	9 km
E	10.6° N	50.7° E	8 km
F	10.1° N	50.2° E	22 km
G	10.1° N	50.9° E	5 km
K	10.2° N	52.8° E	6 km
L	8.7° N	49.0° E	5 km
N	9.7° N	47.9° E	23 km

The following craters have been renamed by the IAU.

- Lick D — See Greaves.
