= Swift (crater) =

Swift as a crater may refer to:

- Swift (lunar crater)
- Swift (Deimian crater)
