= Promontorium Agarum =

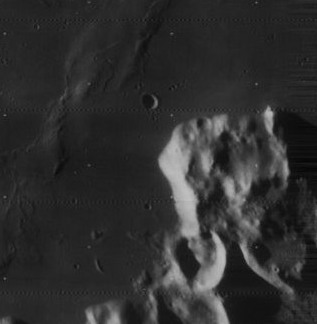
Slightly oblique Lunar Orbiter 4 view of Promontorium Agarum in Mare Crisium

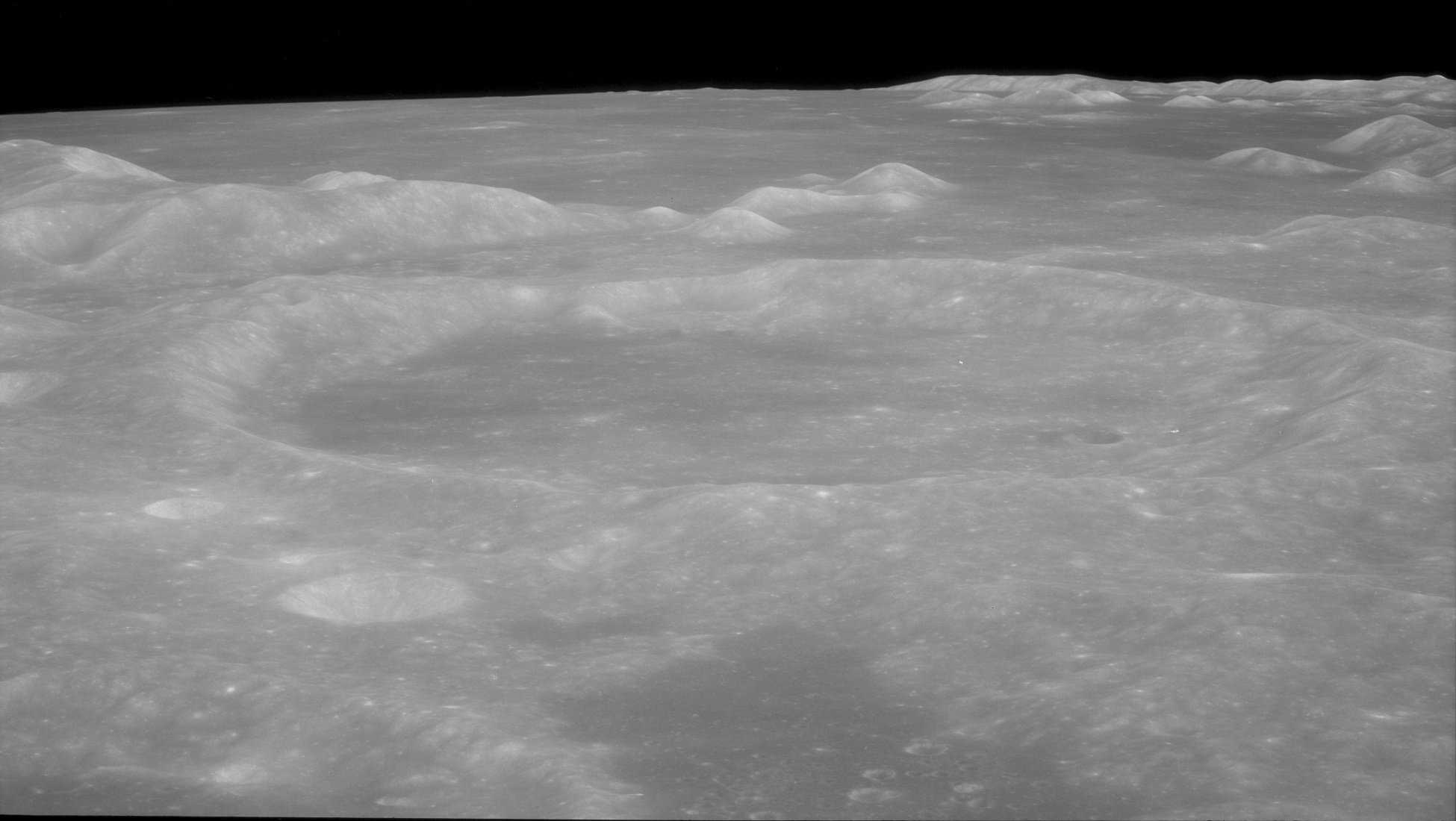
This view from Apollo 11 shows Condorcet crater with Promontorium Agarum in upper left and Mare Crisium in the background

Promontorium Agarum is a raised mountainous cape protruding into the southeast of Mare Crisium on the near side of the Moon. It protrudes into the mare up to 40 km and its width is about 80 km. Its coordinates are 13.87°N 65.73°E.

Promontorium Agarum was named in 1647 by Johannes Hevelius, who assigned names of terrestrial features to the lunar ones. It obtained Ancient Greek name of a cape on the northern shore of the Sea of Azov — probably, modern Berdiansk Spit or Fedotova Spit. It is one of only 4 features which still bear the names given by Hevelius.
