= Dorsum Termier =

Wrinkle ridge on the Moon

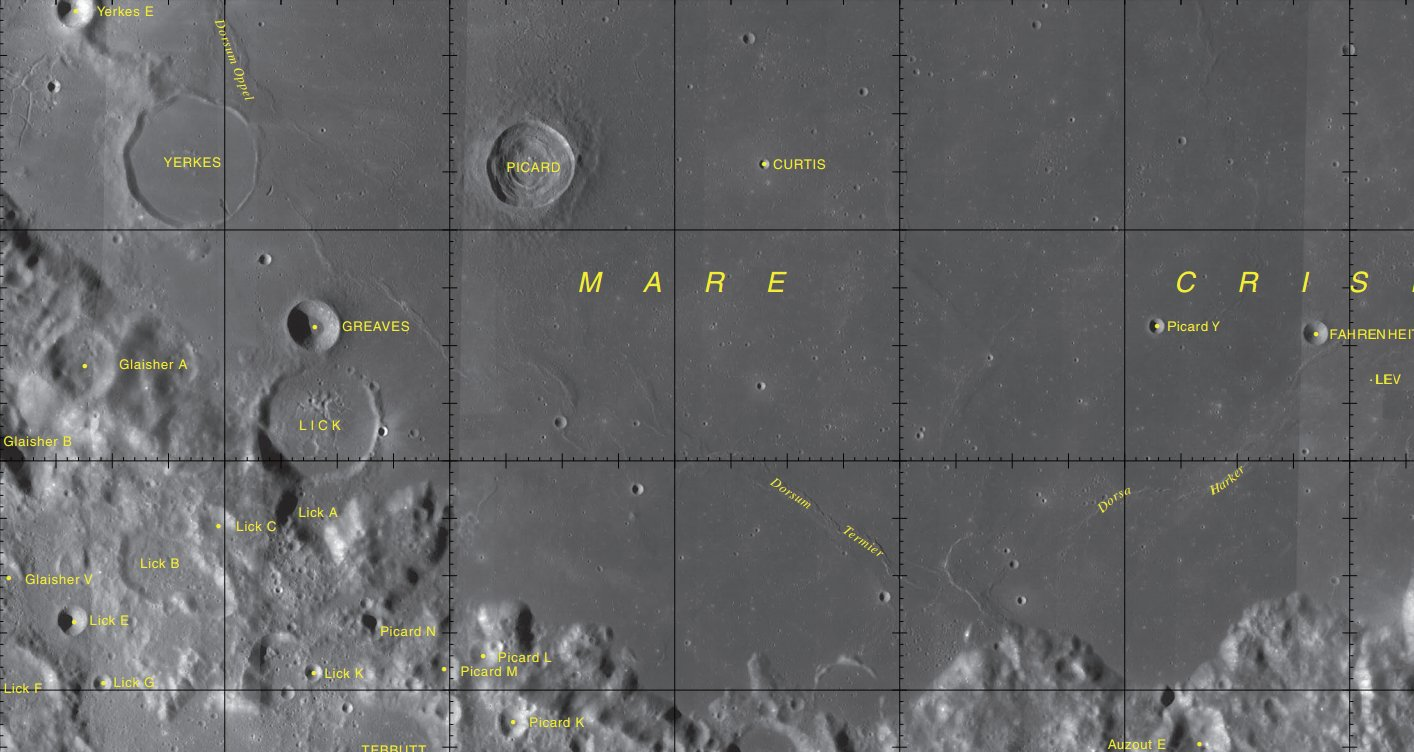
LRO image featuring Curtis Crater, Dorsum Termier (Termier Ridge) is nearly on the mid-bottom of this image map

Dorsum Termier is a wrinkle ridge at 11.0°N 58.0°E in Mare Crisium on the Moon. It is 90 km long. It was named after French geologist Pierre-Marie Termier in 1976.
