= Mikhail Tetyaev =

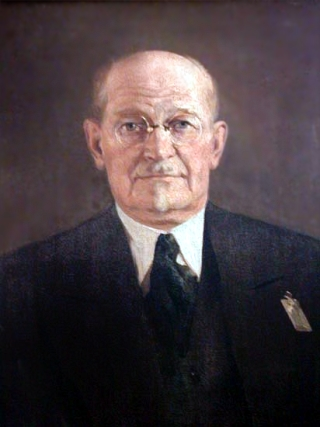
Mikhail Mikhailovich Tetyaev c. 1930

Mikhail Mikhailovich Tetyaev (Russian: Михаил Михайлович Тетяев; 11(23) September 1882, Nizhny Novgorod – 11 October 1956, Leningrad) was a Soviet tectonic geologist.

The wrinkle ridge Dorsa Tetyaev on the Moon is named after him.
