= Mare Crisium =

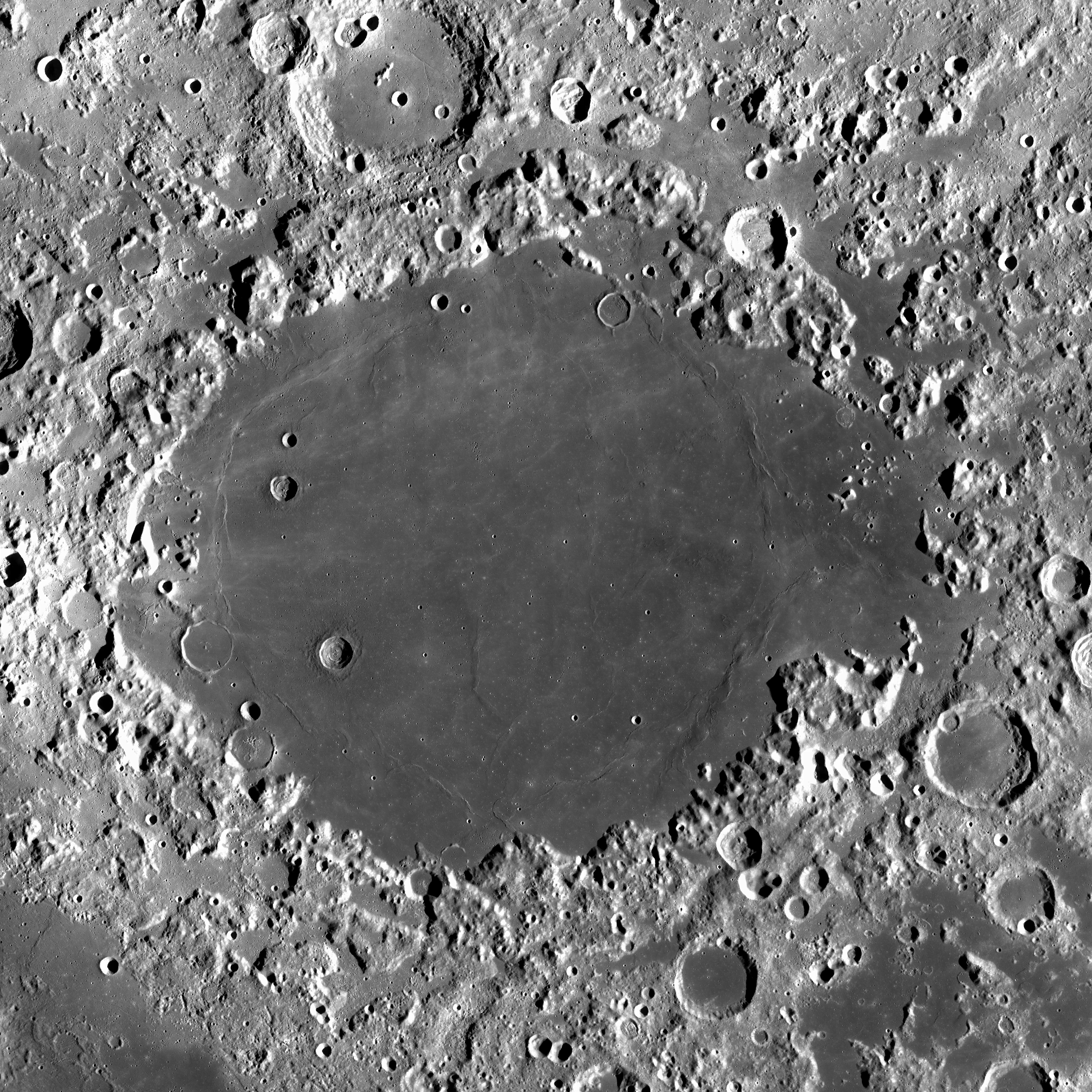
- LRO image
- Coordinates: 17.0°N 59.1°E
- Diameter: 556 km (345 mi)
- Formation: Nectarian

Mare Crisium /ˈkrɪsiəm/ (Latin, 'Sea of Crises') is a lunar mare located in the Moon's Crisium basin, just northeast of Mare Tranquillitatis. Mare Crisium is a basin of Nectarian age. It was formed by the flooding of basaltic lava that filled an ancient asteroid impact.

== Characteristics ==
Mare Crisium is 556 km (345 mi) in diameter, and 176,000 square kilometres (68,000 sq mi) in area. It has a very flat floor, with a ring of wrinkle ridges (dorsa) toward its outer boundaries. These are Dorsa Tetyaev, Dorsum Oppel, Dorsum Termier, and Dorsa Harker. The cape-like feature protruding into the southeast of the mare is Promontorium Agarum. On the western rim of the mare is the palimpsest Yerkes, and Lick to the southeast is similar. The crater Picard is located just to the east of Yerkes, and northwest of Picard are the craters Peirce and Swift. The ray system of the crater Proclus overlie the northwestern mare. Mare Anguis can be seen northeast of Mare Crisium.

A mass concentration (mascon), or gravitational high, was identified in the center of Mare Crisium from Doppler tracking of the five Lunar Orbiter spacecraft in 1968. The mascon was confirmed and mapped at higher resolution with later orbiters such as Lunar Prospector and GRAIL.

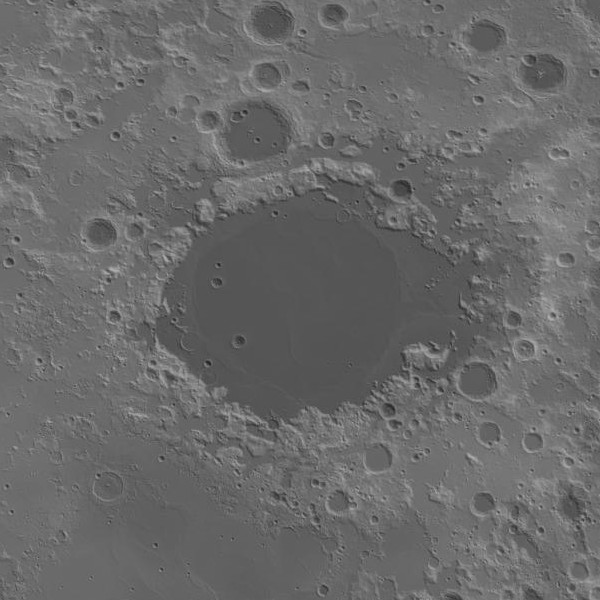
Topographic map

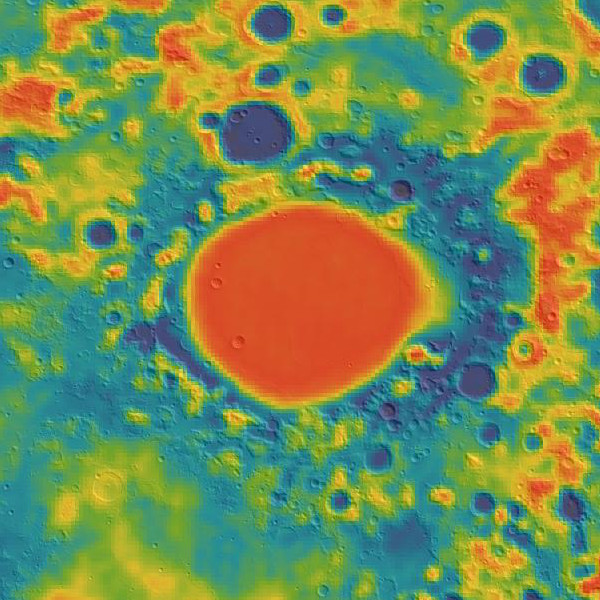
Gravity map based on GRAIL

== Names ==
Like most of the other maria on the Moon, Mare Crisium was named by Giovanni Riccioli, whose 1651 nomenclature system has become standardized.

By the 17th century, Mare Crisium had acquired the name 'Caspian Sea', being labelled as such by Thomas Harriot, Pierre Gassendi and Michael van Langren. Ewen A. Whitaker speculates that it received this name because it occupies roughly the same position on the Moon's face as does the Caspian Sea on Earth, with respect to maps of Europe, North Africa and the Middle East. The English astronomer William Gilbert's map of c.1600 calls it 'Brittania' after Britain.

== Observation and exploration ==
Mare Crisium is just visible from Earth with the naked eye as a small dark spot on the edge of the Moon's face.

It is the site of the 21 July 1969 crash-landing of the Soviet Luna 15 probe, occurring the same day that two Apollo 11 astronauts walked on the Moon. A soil sample from Mare Crisium was successfully brought to Earth on 22 August 1976 by the Soviet lunar mission Luna 24.

Firefly Aerospace's lunar lander carried NASA-sponsored experiments and commercial payloads as a part of Commercial Lunar Payload Services program to Mare Crisium. Landing was completed successfully on 2 March 2025 northwest of Mons Latreille at 18.56°N 61.81°E. The mission ended on 16 March 2025 after completing all of its objectives, including a test of an electrodynamic dust shield to prevent lunar regolith building up on spacecraft surfaces.

== Extension of southwestern ejectaray from Giordano Bruno, east of Mare Crisium ==
During favourable libration of the moon's eastern rim, as seen from Earth, it is possible to observe the extension of the southwestern ejectaray from the young impact crater Giordano Bruno on the moon's farside. The location of this extension is east of Mare Crisium and north of Mare Marginis. It is also noticeable on the photographic version of chart LAC 45 (page 90) in The Clementine Atlas of the Moon (Ben Bussey / Paul D. Spudis).

== In popular culture and literature ==
Mare Crisium is used as the location for Arthur C. Clarke's 1948 seminal short-story "The Sentinel". In the story, a mysterious structure is found in one of the mountains surrounding the Mare. Clarke describes Mare Crisium as follows:

It is the great walled plain, one of the finest on the Moon, known as the Mare Crisium - the Sea of Crises. Three hundred miles in diameter, and almost completely surrounded by a ring of magnificent mountains, it had never been explored until we entered in the late summer of 1996.

In Warhammer 40k, it is the location of the Somnus Citadel, a base for the Sisters of Silence.

Mare Crisium is seen and mentioned throughout the 2022 film Moonfall. It is where the alien A.I. swarm and the astronauts go into the Moon to reach the megastructure beneath the surface.

In Call of Duty: Black Ops (remastered in Call of Duty: Black Ops III), Mare Crisium is the site of a secret, moon base called Griffin Station. The moon base was created by Dr. Edward Richtofen, an evil, mad scientist, to study the mysterious, Moon Pyramid Device, which allows its user to harness dark powers to control zombies and reality itself. Returning from the fabled Shangri-La with his team and tools, they travel to Griffin Station in 2025 to enact Richtofen's plan. After taking control of the pyramid, the moon base artificial intelligence, Dr. Maxis, contacts the remaining team, & recruits them to stop Richtofen to "minimize" the damage. After finishing the calculations, Maxis sends 3 powerful rockets to Earth, destroying it and weakening Richtofen, leading into the events of Call of Duty: Black Ops II.

== Views ==
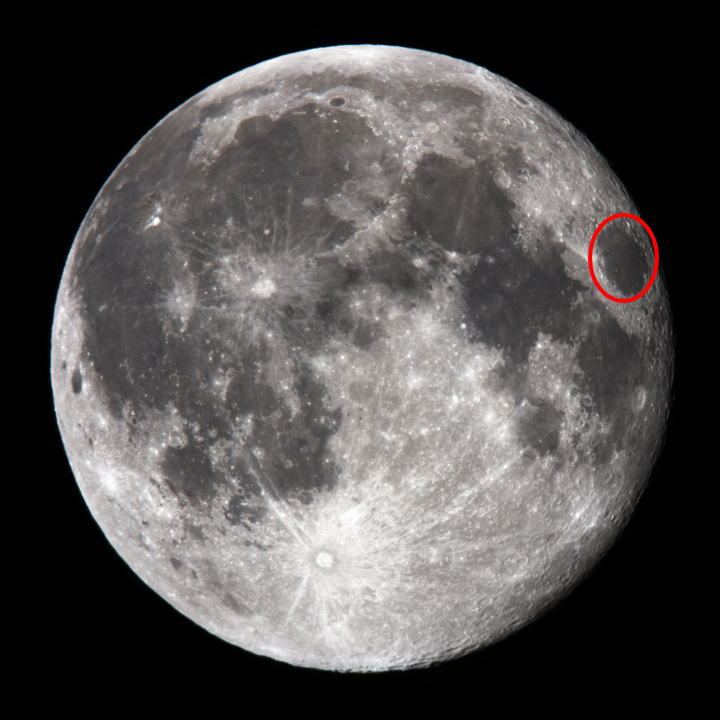
Location of Mare Crisium, as seen from Earth

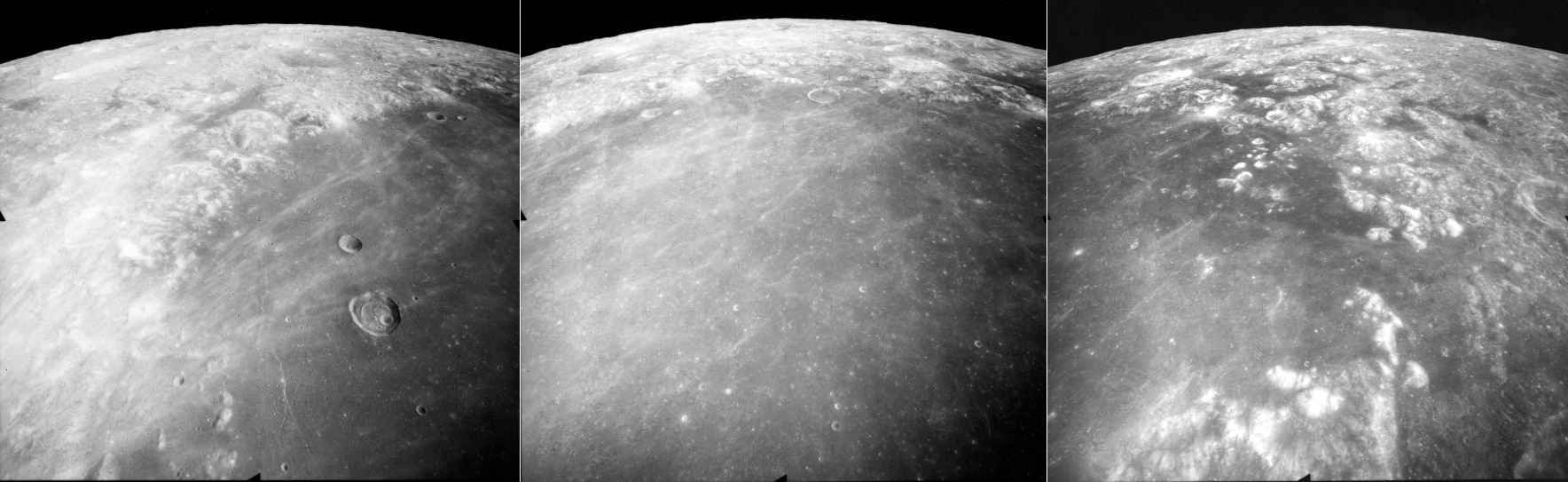
These are three views of northern Mare Crisium on the Moon, taken by the mapping camera of the Apollo 17 mission in 1972, facing north-northeast from an average altitude of 118 km on Revolution 27 of the mission. At the right is the east margin of Mare Crisium, with the north tip of Promontorium Agarum visible in the foreground, and Mare Anguis near the central horizon. The crater Eimmart is visible in both the right and central photos as a bright patch (near the top in each). The center photo shows an obvious lack of large craters in the mare indicating a relatively young age of the basalt, and the crater Eimmart C is visible as a ring at the edge of the mare near the top center. The left photo shows the western margin of the mare, with the crater Peirce (larger) and Swift (smaller) in the mare, and the large crater Cleomedes near the central horizon. The rays of the crater Proclus (further to the west, not shown) are prominent in the mare. These photos were taken within minutes of each other. The sun elevation drops from 60 degrees at right to 46 degrees at left as the Command Module America orbited the Moon.

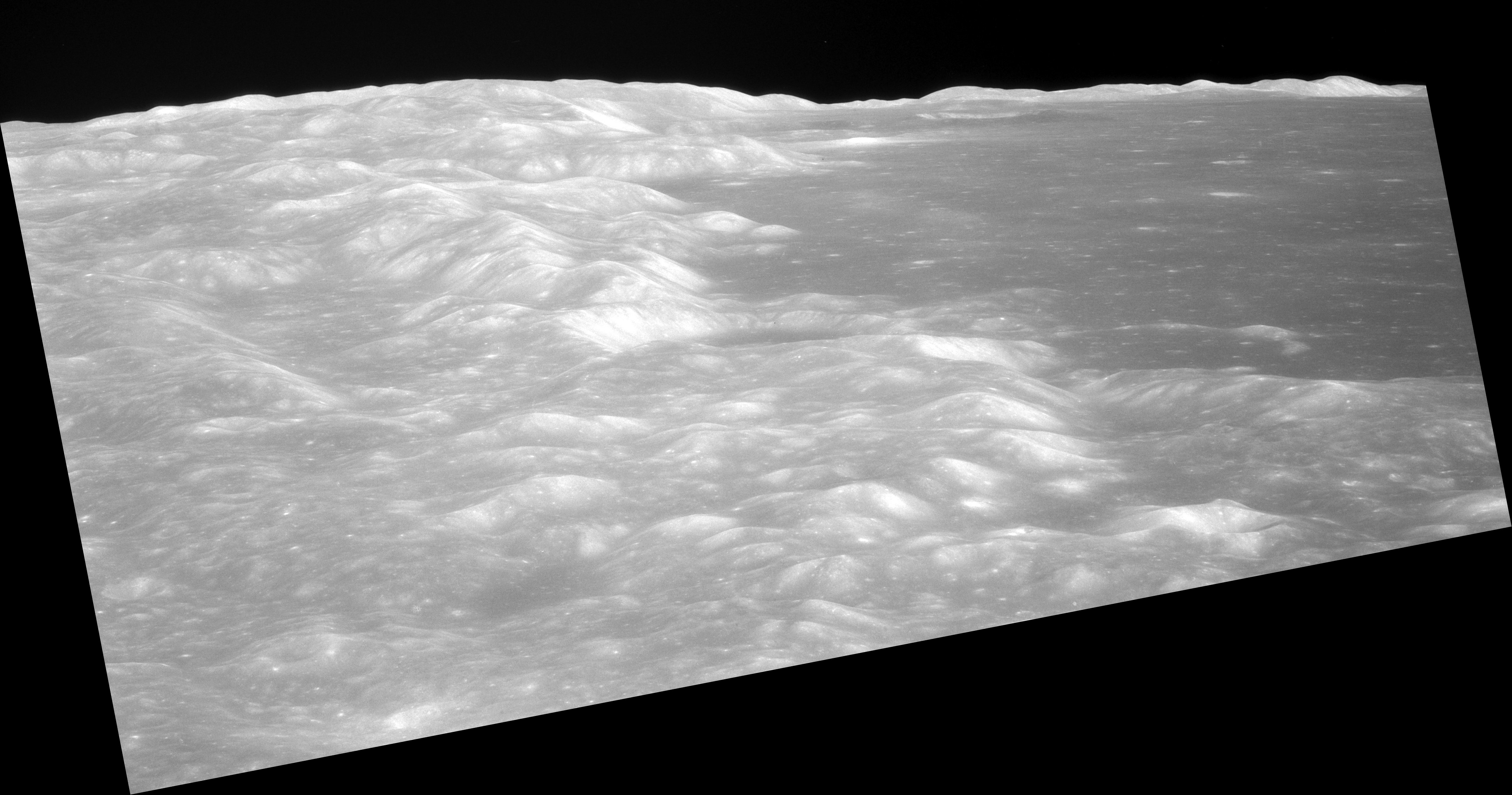
Low-altitude view of southern Mare Crisium from Apollo 11, facing northwest and showing the crater Shapley near center at the edge of the mare, and the distal wall of the crater Greaves near the horizon

== See also ==
- Volcanism on the Moon
