= Georg Christoph Eimmart =

German draughtsman and engraver

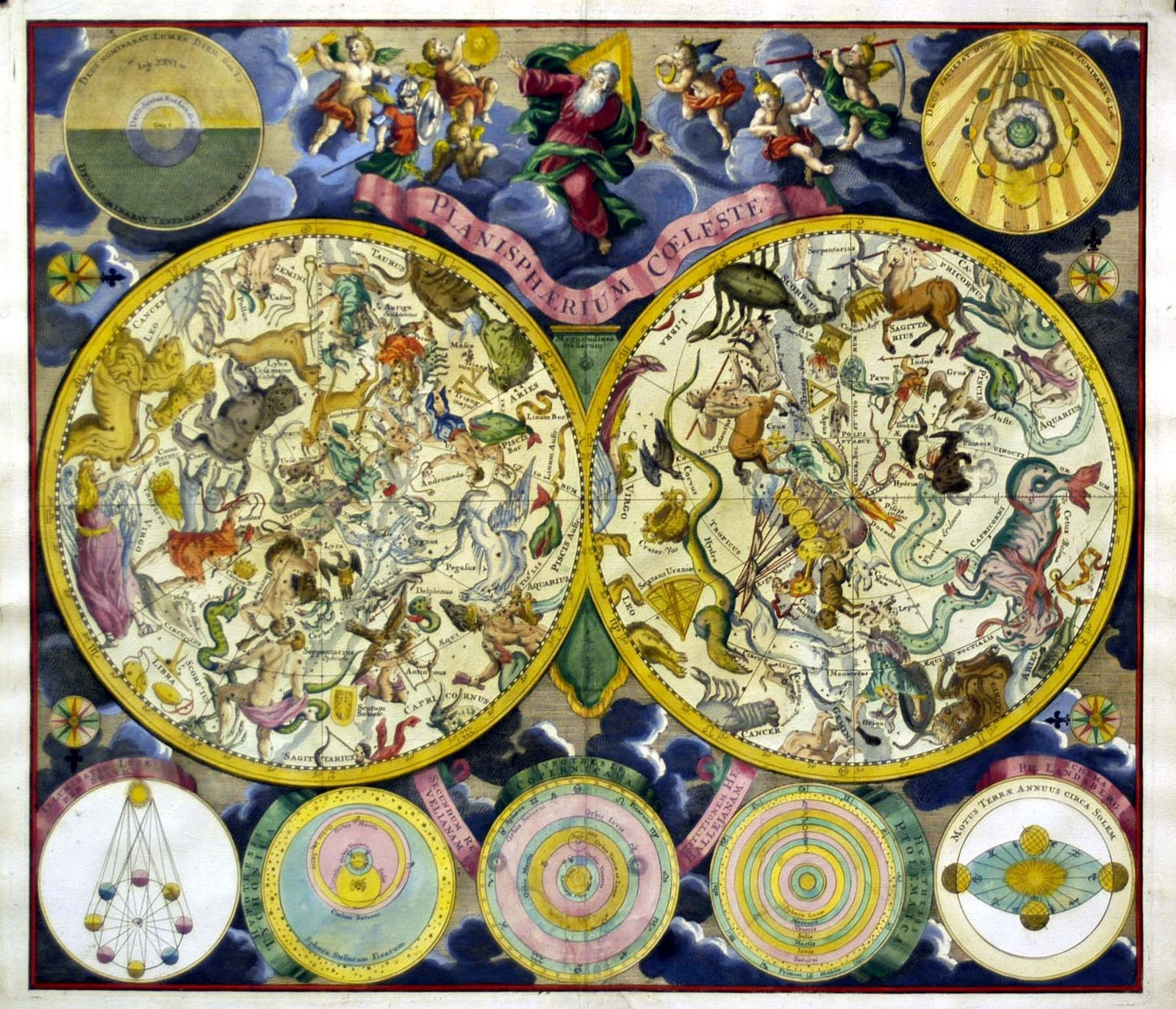
Planisphaerium Coeleste, original shortly before 1705, copy from 1730 by Matthäus Seutter

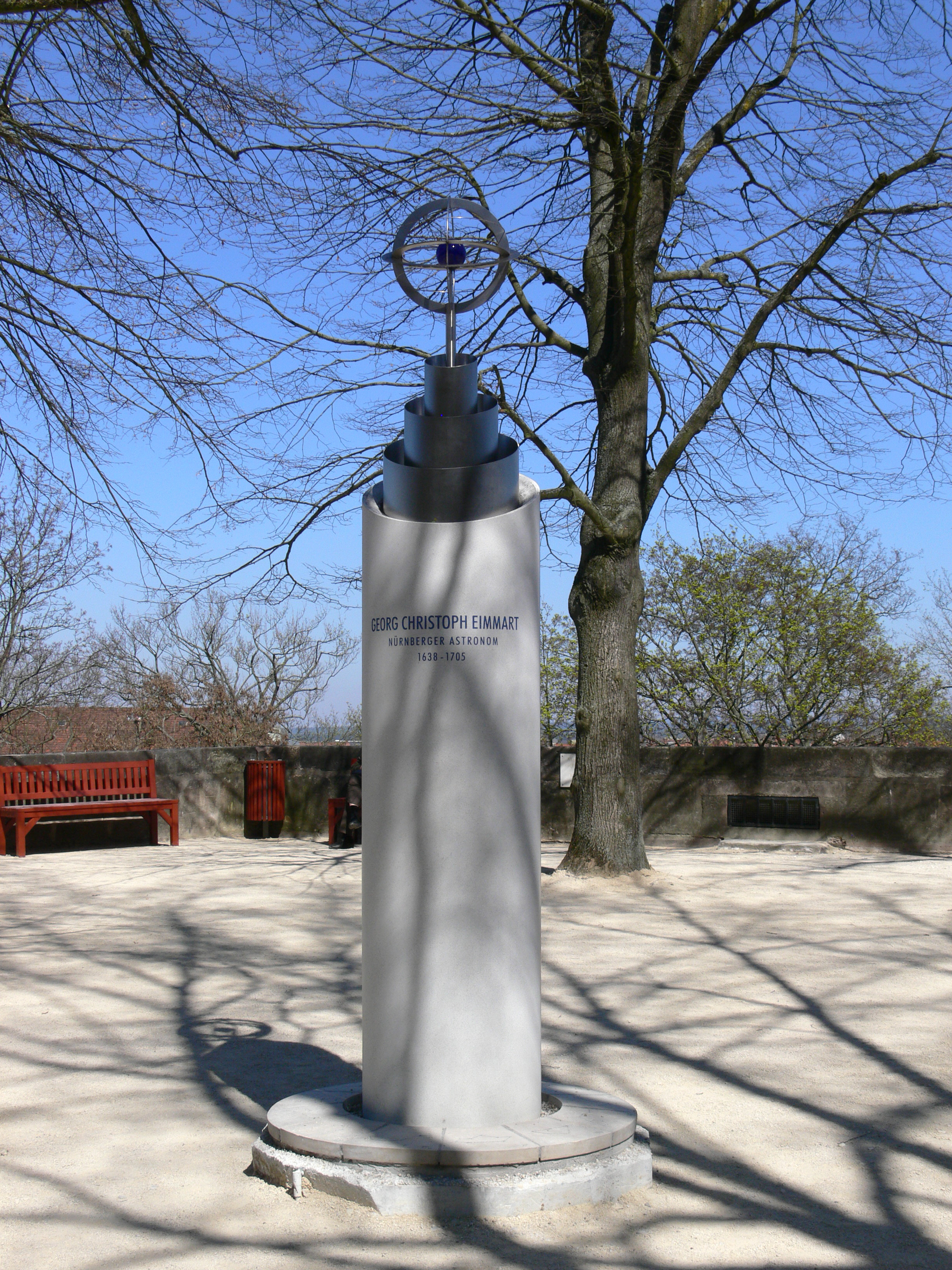
Monument for Eimmart on the Vestnertorbastei near Nuremberg Castle

Georg Christoph Eimmart the Younger (22 August 1638, Regensburg – 5 January 1705, Nürnberg) was a German draughtsman and engraver.

== Biography ==
Eimmart was instructed by his father, Georg Christoph Eimart the Elder (1603-1658), who was also an engraver, a painter of portraits, landscapes, still-life, and historical subjects. He studied at the University of Jena from 1654 to 1658. Eimmart the Younger resided at Nuremberg, where he died in 1705. He engraved some plates for Joachim von Sandrart's Academia, and some small etchings of ruins, buildings, and vases, ornamented with figures, which have considerable merit. He was also a mathematician and astronomer, and published in 1701 Iconographia nova contemplationum de Sole.

His mother was Christine Banns (?-1654), daughter of an Austrian tool manager, Damian Banns. On 20 April 1668 he married Maria Walther, daughter of the weighmaster, Christian Walther. His daughter Maria Clara Eimmart (1676–1707) was a designer and engraver as well who usually worked with her father. She married the astronomer Johann Heinrich Müller and died at Altdorf in 1707.

He established the first astronomical observatory in Nuremberg. The lunar crater Eimmart is named after Georg Christoph Eimmart the Younger.
