= Maria Clara Eimmart =

German astronomer and engraver (1676–1707)

Maria Clara Eimmart (27 May 1676 – 28 October 1707) was a German astronomer, engraver and artist known for her detailed astronomical illustrations. Working at the Nuremberg observatory established by her father, astronomer Georg Christoph Eimmart the Younger, she recorded observations of the Moon, planets, comets and eclipses.

Between 1693 and 1698, Eimmart produced hundreds of telescopic studies documenting the phases of the Moon. She also recorded the 1697 transit of Mercury and the total solar eclipse of 12 May 1706. Her surviving depictions of the 1706 eclipse, rediscovered at the Berlin State Library in 2012, have been used by modern researchers studying the solar corona during the Maunder Minimum.

== Early life ==
Maria Clara Eimmart was born on 27 May 1676 in Nuremberg to Maria Walther and the artist and astronomer Georg Christoph Eimmart the Younger. She was their only surviving child; an older brother had died in infancy in 1669. When Eimmart was about two years old, her father built an astronomical observatory on the Vestnertor bastion of the Nuremberg city wall, north of Nuremberg Castle.

Eimmart was educated by her father, who taught her painting, etching, Latin, French and mathematics. She became interested in astronomy while young and assisted with work at the observatory. A drawing she made of a Vestal Virgin in 1691, when she was about 15, survives in the Germanisches Nationalmuseum in Nuremberg.

== Marriage and family ==
Eimmart married astronomer Johann Heinrich Müller on 20 January 1706, when she was 29. Müller had been a pupil of her father and succeeded him as director of the Nuremberg observatory. The couple had one child, a son named Michael, who was baptized on 23 July 1707. Michael died at about ten weeks old, in late September or early October.

== Astronomical paintings ==
Eimmart combined her training as an artist with her work at her father's observatory in Nuremberg. In addition to astronomical subjects, she made pictures of flowers, fruit and figures from classical antiquity. Her astronomical work included studies of the Moon, planets, comets and eclipses.

From 11 January 1693 to 8 March 1698, between the ages of 16 and 21, Eimmart made about 235 studies of the Moon based on observations through a telescope. The drawings recorded the Moon at different phases and are now held in Saint Petersburg.

Other astronomical works by Eimmart survive at the Museo della Specola in Bologna. Ten large works, dating from about 1693 to 1698, are made in pastel on dark blue cardboard. They depict the Moon, Mercury, Venus, Mars, Jupiter, Saturn, comets and atmospheric phenomena. They belonged to a group of twelve works probably given by Eimmart's father to the scientist Luigi Ferdinando Marsili, possibly in 1695. Three smaller studies of the Moon, made on brown paper, also survive in Bologna.

Some of Eimmart's astronomical works record her own observations, while others depict observations made by other astronomers. On 24 October 1697, aged 21, she observed Mercury passing between Earth and the Sun. A surviving illustration identifies Eimmart as the observer, and she described the event in a letter to the Swiss naturalist Johann Jakob Scheuchzer on 20 November 1697.

On 12 May 1706, aged 29, Eimmart observed a total solar eclipse from Nuremberg and made two coloured depictions of the event. They show the solar corona, the Sun's outer atmosphere, visible around the Moon during the eclipse. Another copy was given to the Nuremberg City Library but was later lost. The surviving images were also thought to have been lost until Markus Heinz identified them at the Berlin State Library in 2012, 306 years after Eimmart made them. Researchers have found that her depictions agree closely with written descriptions of the eclipse and have used them to study the solar corona during the Maunder Minimum, a period of unusually low sunspot activity from about 1645 to 1715.

== Illustrations ==
Eimmart is best known for her exact astronomical illustrations done in pale pastels on dark blue cardboard. Between 1693 and 1698, Eimmart made over 350 drawings of the phases of the moon. This collection of drawings, drawn solely from observations through a telescope, was entitled Micrographia stellarum phases lunae ultra 300. Twelve of these were given to Luigi Ferdinando Marsili, a scientific collaborator of her father's, and ten survive in Bologna, together with three smaller studies on brown paper. Eimmart’s continuous series of depictions became the basis for a new lunar map. In 1706, Eimmart made two illustrations of the total eclipse at Nuremberg. There are also some drawings of planets and comets.

== Death ==
Eimmart died in Nuremberg on 28 October 1707, aged 31, about four weeks after the death of her son. Gaab states that she died from a "hectic fever" contracted following childbirth.

== Gallery ==
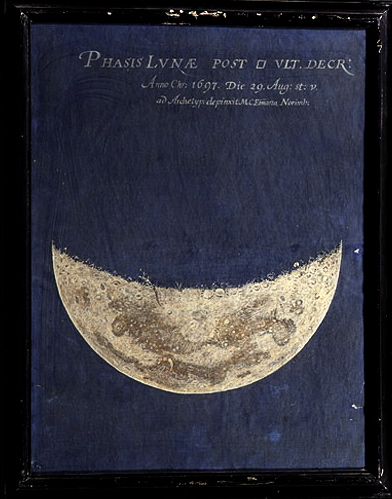
Phase of the Moon observed

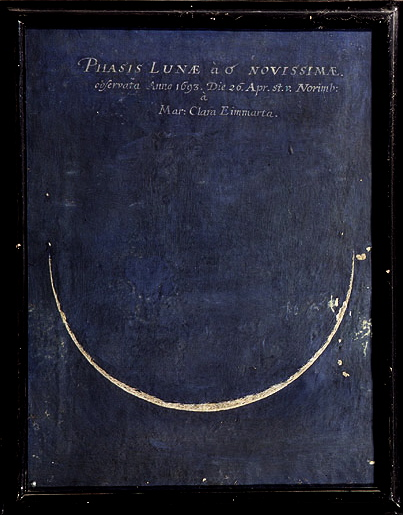
Second Phase of the Moon

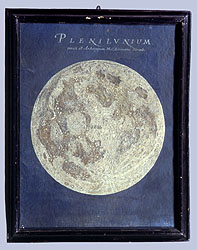
Illustration of the full Moon

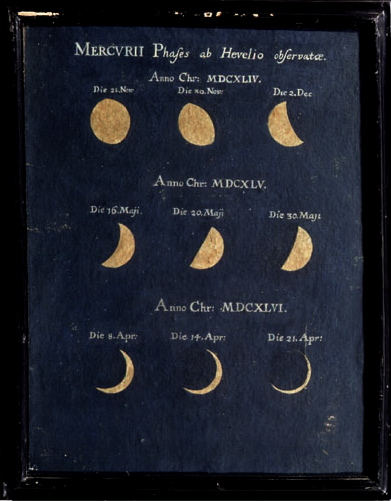
Phase of Mercury Observed by Johannes Hevelius

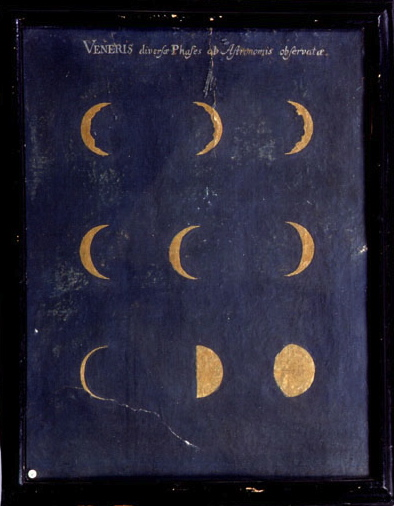
Phase of Venus

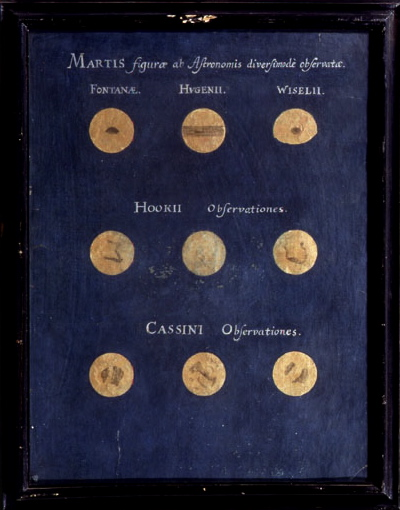
Aspect of Mars

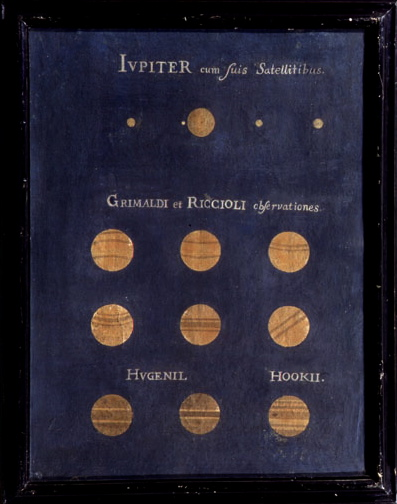
Aspect of Jupiter

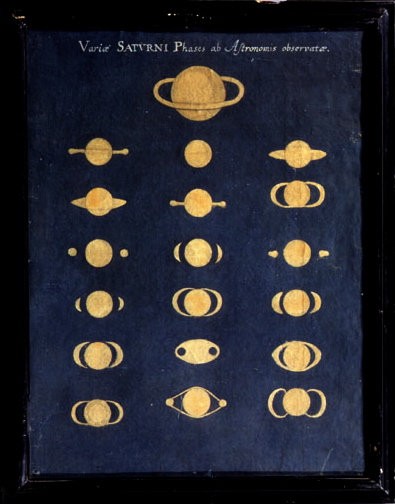
Aspect of Saturn

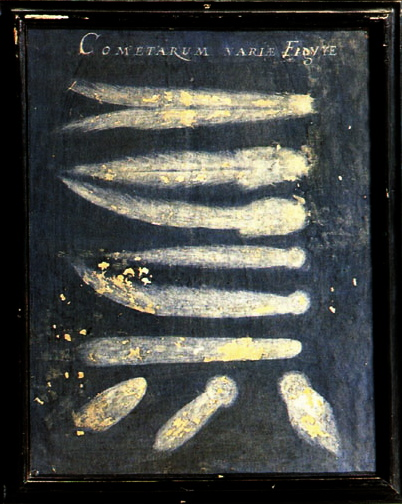
Comets

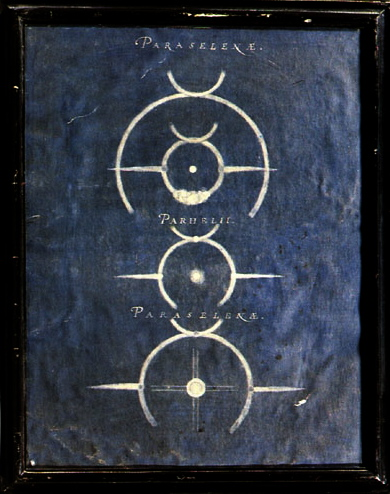
Paraselene and Parhelion

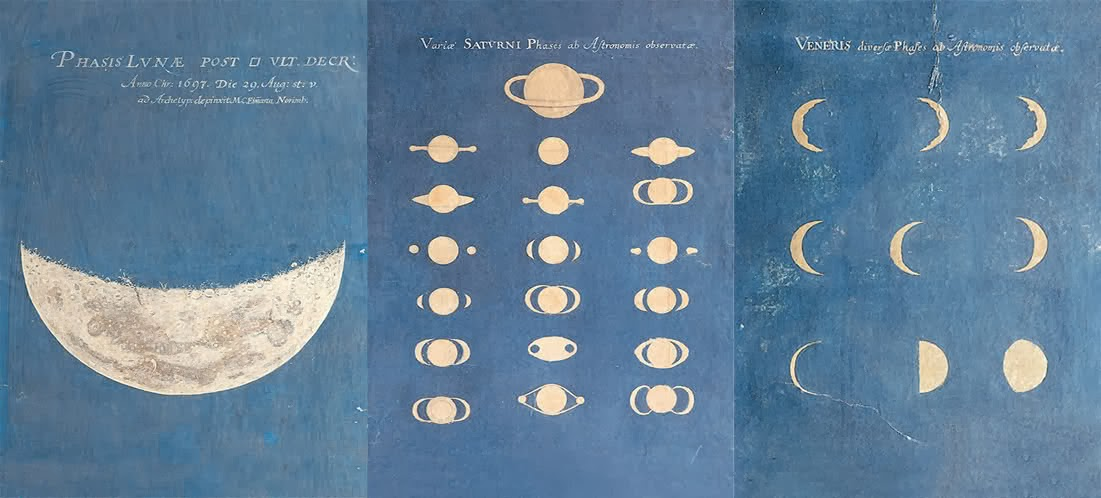
Astronomical illustrations

== See also ==
- Timeline of women in science

== Literature ==
- Hans Gaab: Zum 300. Todestag von Maria Clara Eimmart (1676–1707). In: Regiomontanusbote. 20, 4/2007, S. 7–19.
- Hans Gaab: Maria Clara Eimmart. Eine Nürnberger Astronomin. In: Nadja Bennewitz, Gaby Franger: Geschichte der Frauen in Mittelfranken. Alltag, Personen und Orte. Ars vivendi, Cadolzburg 2003, S. 145–152.
- Ronald Stoyan: Die Nürnberger Mondkarten. Teil 1: Die Mondkarte von Georg Christoph Eimmart (1638–1705) und Maria Clara Eimmart (1676–1707). In: Regiomontanusbote. 14, 1/2001, S. 29–39.
- Karl Christian Bruhns (1877). "Eimmart, Georg Christoph" . Allgemeine Deutsche Biographie (in German). Vol. 5. Leipzig: Duncker & Humblot. p. 758.
- Siegmund Günther (1885). "Müller, Johann Heinrich" . Allgemeine Deutsche Biographie (in German). Vol. 22. Leipzig: Duncker & Humblot. pp. 583–585.
- Adolf Wißner (1959), "Georg Christoph Eimmart", Neue Deutsche Biographie (NDB) (in German) (Berlin: Duncker & Humblot) 4: 394–394, (full text online)
