= Eimmart (crater) =

Lunar impact crater

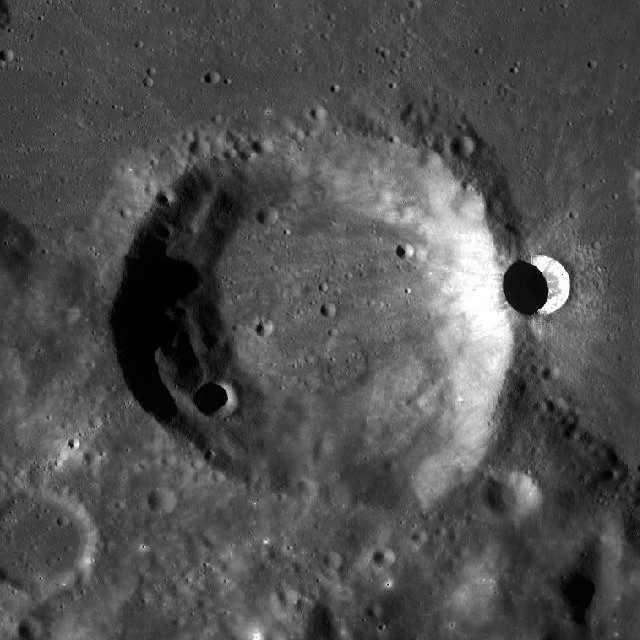
- LRO mosaic
- Coordinates: 23.97°N 64.80°E
- Diameter: 44.99 km (27.96 mi)
- Depth: 3.2 km (2.0 mi)
- Colongitude: 296° at sunrise
- Formation: Nectarian
- Eponym: Georg C. Eimmart

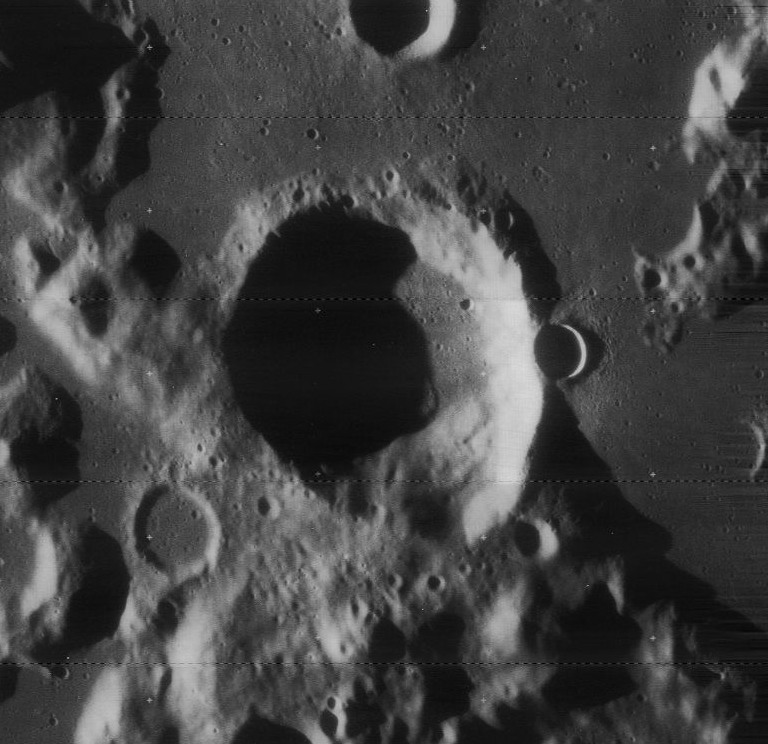
Lunar Orbiter 4 image

Eimmart is a lunar impact crater that is located near the east-northeastern limb of the Moon, to the northeast of the Mare Crisium. The northern and eastern outer rim of this crater borders on the narrow Mare Anguis. To the northwest of Eimmart are the smaller crater Delmotte and the prominent Cleomedes.

This crater dates to around the time the Crisium basin formed, during the Nectarian period on the lunar geologic timescale. The rim has been lightly eroded, especially along the south-southeastern portion, but most of the edge remains intact. Patches within the crater and a long the rim appear rich in magnesium-spinel lithography. The small, fresh crater Eimmart A lies along the eastern rim, and is surrounded by a skirt of higher albedo material, particularly to the south and west across the interior of Eimmart. The interior floor is relatively level, and is marked by the ray material from Eimmart A.

This formation is named after German astronomer Georg Cristoph Eimmart (1638-1705). His name was introduced in the lunar nomenclature of German astronomer Johann H. Schröter in 1791. Its designation was officially adopted by the International Astronomical Union in 1935.

== Bright satellite crater Eimmart A before and during full moon ==
Already visible during waxing crescent moon, the bright satellite crater Eimmart A at Mare Anguis is an eye-catcher which is observable every night until full moon. The brightness of Eimmart A is also noticeable on the photographic version of chart LAC 44 (page 88) in The Clementine Atlas of the Moon (Ben Bussey / Paul D. Spudis).

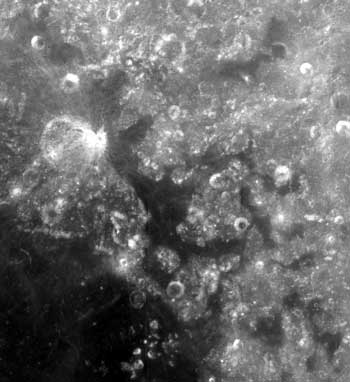
Mare Anguis is the dark patch in the middle of this photo. The crater in the left center of the photo is Eimmart, and is at the northwestern tip of Mare Anguis.

== Satellite craters ==
By convention these features are identified on lunar maps by placing the letter on the side of the crater midpoint that is closest to Eimmart.

Eimmart	Latitude	Longitude	Diameter
A	24.0° N	65.7° E	7 km
B	21.4° N	66.5° E	11 km
C	22.4° N	61.2° E	24 km
D	23.0° N	69.1° E	11 km
F	23.3° N	61.9° E	8 km
G	25.5° N	64.8° E	14 km
H	22.1° N	64.4° E	16 km
K	20.2° N	67.6° E	13 km

The mare-flooded crater Eimmart C lies 67 km to the east Eimmart. It appears fractured and has a wrinkle ridge.

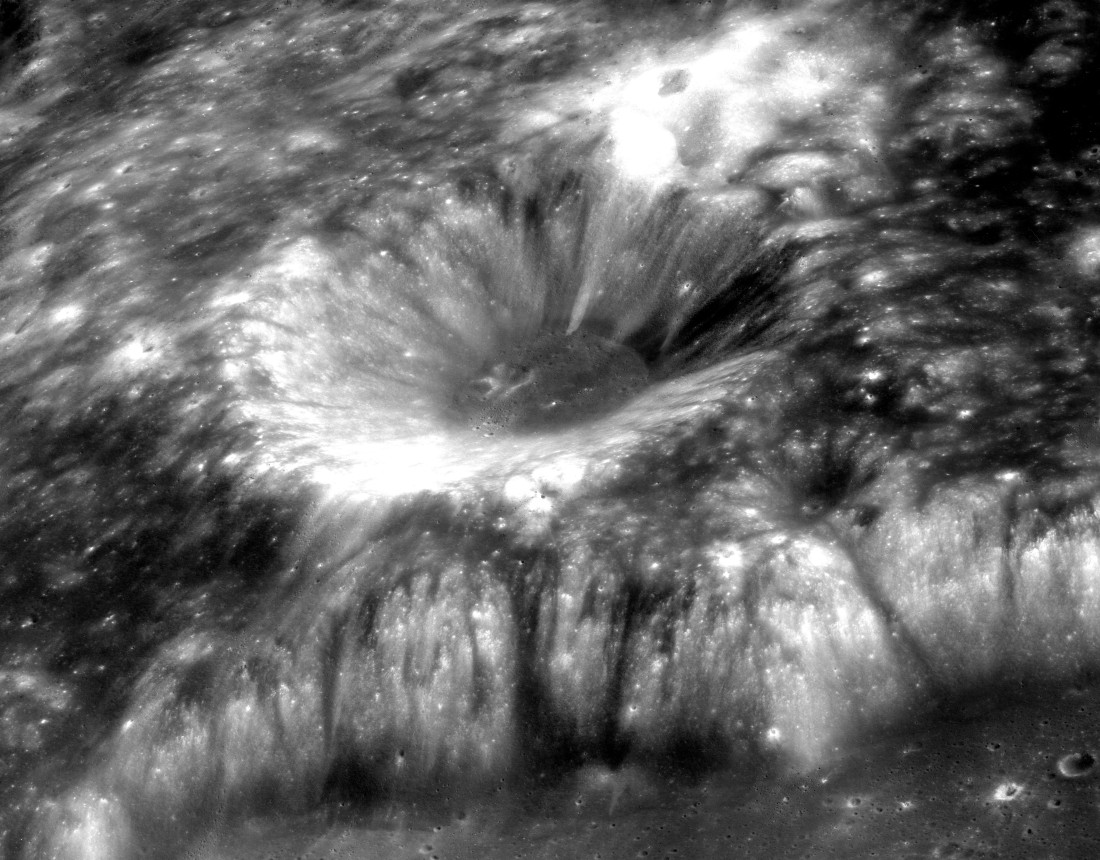
Eimmart H

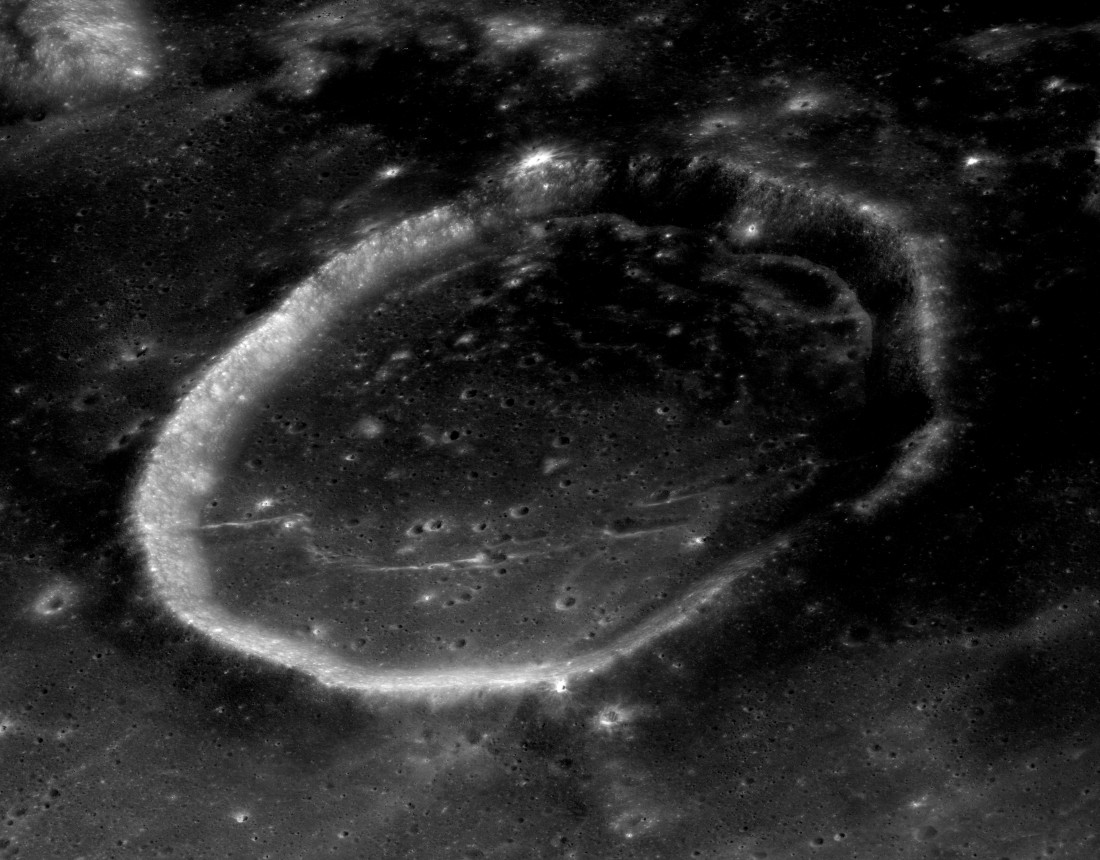
Eimmart C
