= Yerkes (crater) =

Crater on the Moon

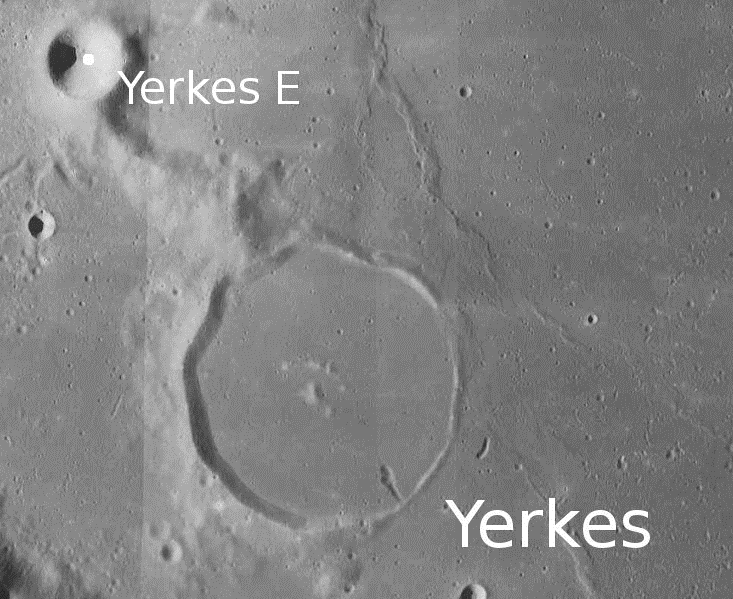
- LRO image
- Coordinates: 14.6°N 51.7°E
- Diameter: 36 km
- Depth: 0.62 km
- Colongitude: 310° at sunrise
- Eponym: Charles T. Yerkes

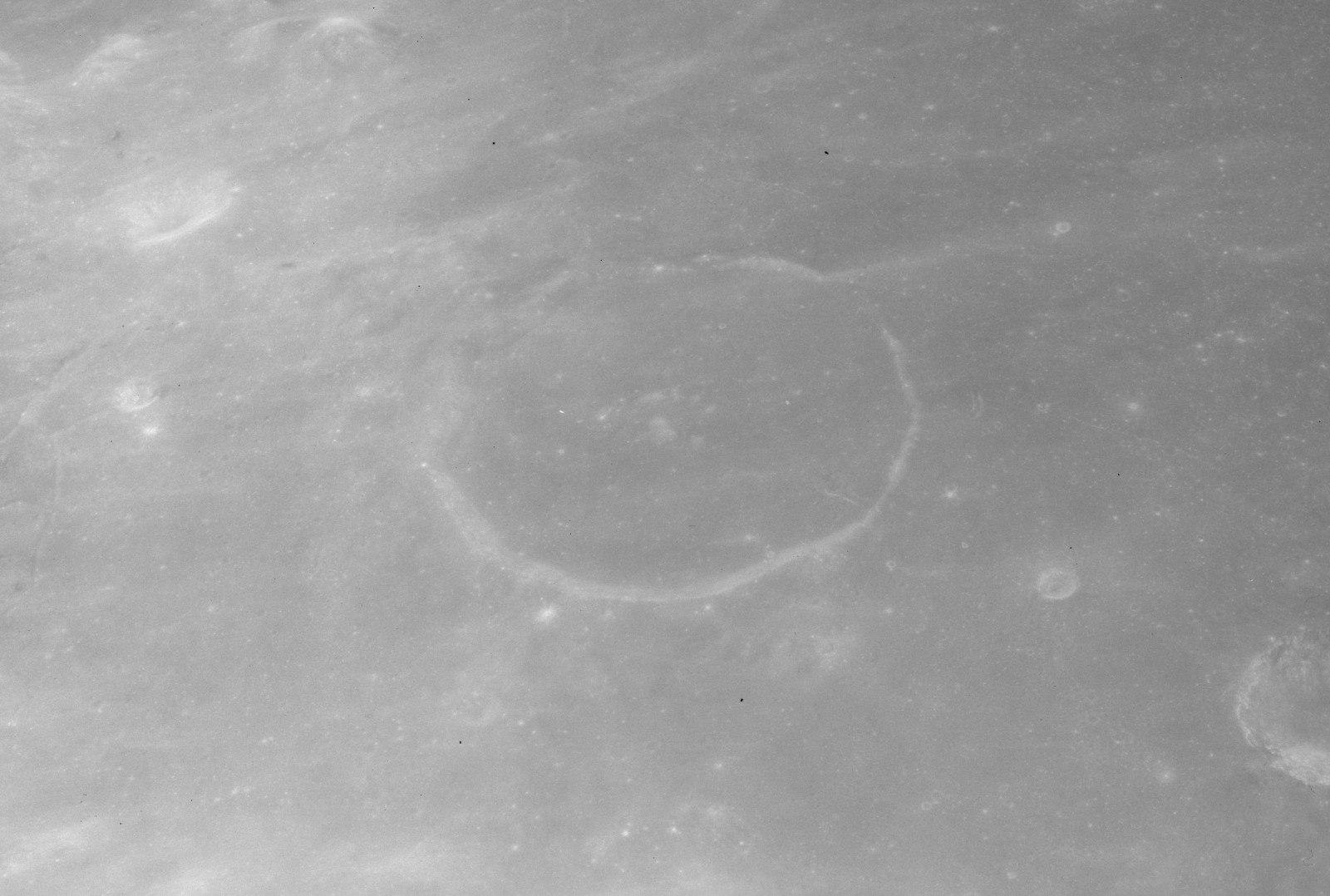
Oblique view from Apollo 15

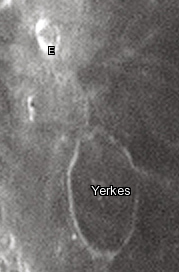
Yerkes and its satellite crater taken from Earth in 2012 at the University of Hertfordshire's Bayfordbury Observatory with the telescopes Meade LX200 14" and Lumenera Skynyx 2-1

Yerkes is a lunar impact crater near the western edge of Mare Crisium. It was named after American financier Charles Yerkes. To the east of Yerkes is the crater Picard, and farther to the north is Peirce.

In the past the interior of Yerkes has been almost completely inundated by lava, leaving only a shallow remnant of a rim above the mare. The rim is widest on the western and southern portions, and barely existent to the east, forming a thin curve in the surface. A low ridge runs from the north rim to Yerkes E in the north-northwest. The floor has a similar albedo to the nearby mare, so the feature is not sharply distinguished from the surroundings.

== Satellite craters ==
By convention these features are identified on lunar maps by placing the letter on the side of the crater midpoint that is closest to Yerkes.

| Yerkes | Latitude | Longitude | Diameter |
|---|---|---|---|
| E | 15.90° N | 50.67° E | 9.91 km |
| V | 15.24° N | 50.49° E | 3.7 km |
