= Swift (lunar crater) =

Crater on the Moon

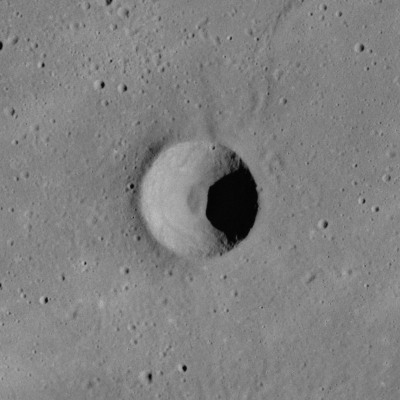
- Apollo 17 mapping camera image
- Coordinates: 19.35°N 53.44°E
- Diameter: 10.06 km (6.25 mi)
- Depth: 2.0 km (1.2 mi)
- Colongitude: 307° at sunrise
- Eponym: Lewis A. Swift

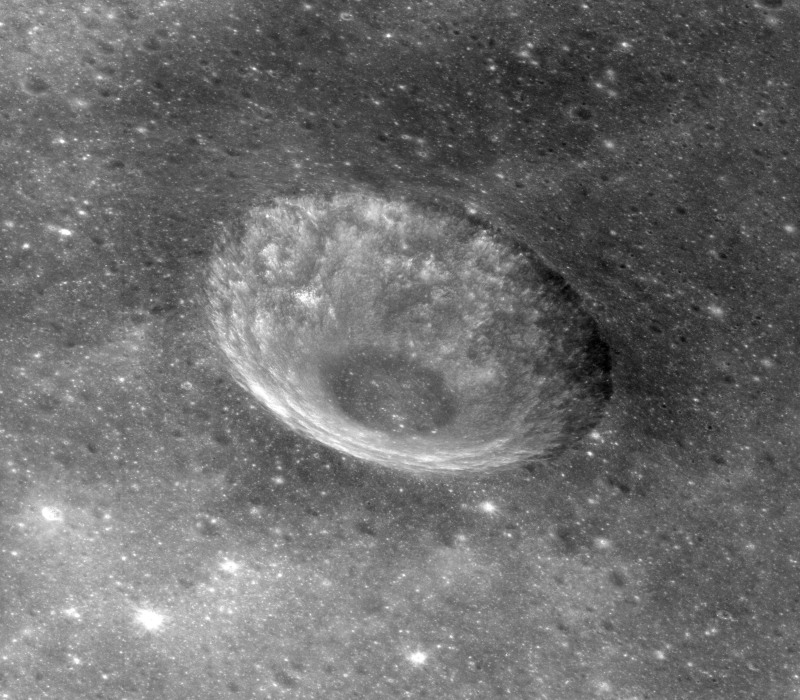
Oblique view from Apollo 17, facing north

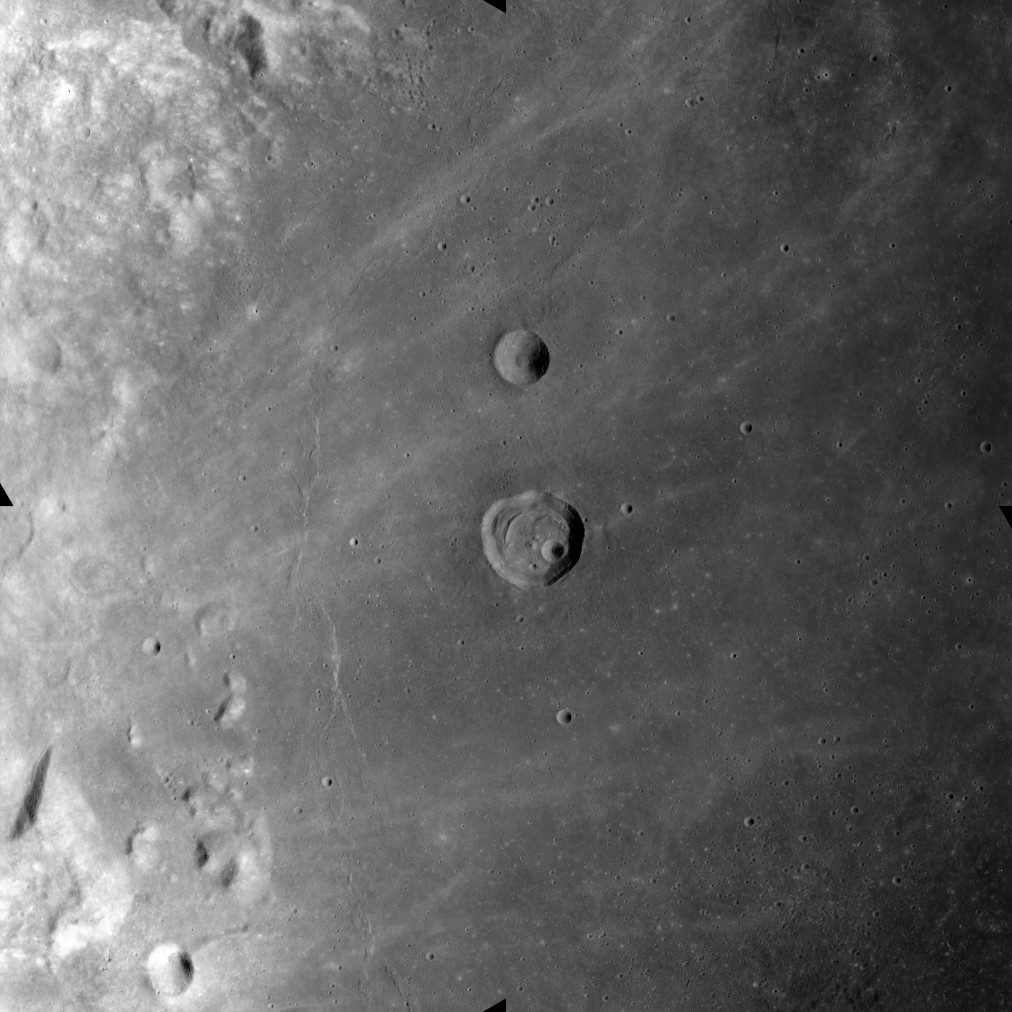
Swift (above center) and Peirce (center) from Apollo 17. The rays from the left are from Proclus. NASA photo.

Swift is a small lunar impact crater located in the northwestern part of the Mare Crisium, in the northeast part of the Moon's near side. Within two crater diameters to the south is the larger crater Peirce. It was named after American astronomer Lewis A. Swift. Swift was previously designated Peirce B.

This circular and bowl-shaped formation has a small floor at the midpoint of the sloping interior walls. It is a symmetrical crater with little evidence of wear from minor impacts.

This crater has been incorrectly named 'Graham' on some maps.
