= The Daily Compass =

New York City newspaper (1949–1952)

- A front page, date unknown
- Type: Daily newspaper
- Format: Tabloid
- Owner: Ted Thackrey
- Publisher: Ted Thackrey
- Founded: May 1949
- Ceased publication: November 1952

The Daily Compass was an American leftist newspaper in New York City, New York, published from May 16, 1949, through November 3, 1952. It is best known for its columns by the investigative journalist I. F. Stone.

== Publication history ==
The Daily Compass, which included the weekend Sunday Compass, was a successor to the leftist New York City newspaper PM, published from June 1940 to June 22, 1948, and that paper's first successor, the New York Star, published from June 23, 1948, to January 28, 1949.

Ted Thackrey — the features editor of the New York Post before marrying Post owner Dorothy Schiff in 1943, after which the two became co-publishers/co-editors — had become solo publisher of the Post, at the behest of his wife, for a disastrous three months. He then "left with a following of firebrand writers to start his own paper", buying the building and physical plant at which PM and the Star had been published, at Duane Street and Hudson Street in Manhattan. With private financing, he founded The Daily Compass and was its publisher and president. The paper's first edition came out on May 16, 1949.

The investigative journalist I. F. Stone wrote a column six days a week. Jazz club impresario Art D'Lugoff, then spelling his name Art Dlugoff, was a copy boy, as was future Newsday sportswriter Stan Isaacs. Future magazine editor Clay Felker was a sportswriter for the paper. The city editor / managing editor, Tom O'Connor, who appeared before the House Un-American Activities Committee in May 1952 without naming others, died of a heart attack at the Compass office while watching a televised broadcast of the Democratic National Convention on July 24, 1952.

== Financing and distribution ==
The Daily Compass was chiefly financed through Chicago philanthropist Anita McCormick Blaine, the McCormick Harvesting Machine Company heiress, who furnished either $300,000 or $2 million for the start-up (sources differ). She was introduced to Thackrey in late April 1949 by a mutual friend who had intended to put up half the money. When the friend backed out, Blaine invested the whole amount in return for all the preferred stock; Thackrey held 51% of the common stock, and control. Blaine said at the time, "My purpose is to help create a better world state. You have only to think of the need for this thing ... look at the press of the world today...."

The paper was distributed by the Metropolitan News Company and some 16 other distributors. William Peyton Marin was the company treasurer. Bernard Goldstein, the assistant treasurer and controller of the New York Star, was the assistant treasurer. Following the company's dissolution, its books and records were stored at the AAAAAA American City Wide Express Service at 1135 Tiffany Street, The Bronx, for two to three years before prepaid funds ran out and the documents were scheduled to be destroyed.

== Aftermath ==
The Daily Compass ceased publication on November 3, 1952. Thackrey then joined the public relations firm Ruder Finn. In 1959, he and Goldstein testified at the U.S. Senate's "Hearings Before the Select Committee in Improper Activities on the Labor or Management Field", which investigated alleged improprieties by the newspaper deliverers union, including payoffs to ensure Compass distribution.

== Archives ==
Back issues of the full run of The Daily Compass are stored at the New York State Library and at Sarah Lawrence College.
