= Matilda Landsman =

Matilda Landsman (October 18, 1918– February 18, 1986) was a New York Times employee in the 1950s. She was subpoenaed by the Senate Internal Security Subcommittee in November 1955 during their investigation into Communists in the media. She was one of 34 news media employees to be subpoenaed by the Senate after the testimony of journalist Winston Burdett, a one-time spy for the Soviet Union, in June 1955. Landsman worked as a Linotype operator at the time of her testimony in January 1956. According to allegations from unnamed sources Landsman had voluntarily obtained reassignment from the Times newsroom to the Linotype department, at lower pay, in order to do organizing and recruiting for the Communist Party among members of the powerful and militant typographers union, which was to shut down all the newspapers in New York City in a crippling 114-day 1962–63 New York City newspaper strike which left half the daily papers in New York dead or mortally wounded. In the past she had worked as a stenographer in the Times news and Sunday departments, and as a secretary to Joseph Fels Barnes, editor of the defunct New York Star, the brief-lived successor to the progressive/left daily newspaper PM.

In her testimony she invoked the Fifth Amendment to avoid answering questions about her affiliation with the Communist Party.

Landsman was born in the Bronx on October 18, 1918.
