= Ralph Ingersoll =

Ralph Ingersoll may refer to:

- Ralph I. Ingersoll (1789–1872), United States representative from Connecticut
- Ralph Ingersoll (PM publisher) (1900–1985), founder and publisher of the short-lived 1940s daily newspaper PM
- Ralph M. Ingersoll Jr., American newspaper publisher
