= Ted Thackrey =

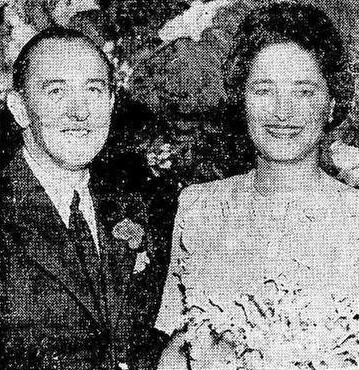
Thackrey with his wife Dorothy Schiff, 1943

Theodore Olin Thackrey (November 17, 1901 – October 24, 1980) was an American journalist and publisher, best known as the editor of the New York Post in the 1940s, and the founder of the leftist New York City newspaper The Daily Compass.

== Biography ==
Following the demise of the leftist New York City newspaper PM, published from June 1940 to June 22, 1948, and that paper's first successor, the New York Star, published from June 23, 1948, to January 28, 1949, Ted Thackrey founded The Daily Compass. Thackrey had been the features editor of the New York Post before marrying Post owner Dorothy Schiff in 1943, after which the two became co-publishers/co-editors. In 1948, he became solo publisher of the Post at the behest of his wife, leading to a disastrous three-month tenure in which major advertisers dropped the paper and Schiff returned to take over. Thackrey "left with a following of firebrand writers to start his paper," buying the building and physical plant at which PM and the Star had been published, at Duane Street and Hudson Street in Manhattan. He founded The Daily Compass as its publisher and president with private financing. The paper began publishing on May 16, 1949, and ceased publication in November 1952.

After The Daily Compass ceased publication, Thackrey joined the public relations firm Ruder Finn. In 1959, Thackrey and Goldstein testified at the U.S. Senate's "Hearings Before the Select Committee on Improper Activities in the Labor or Management Field", which investigated alleged improprieties by the newspaper deliverers' union and forcible payoffs to ensure Compass distribution.

In 1948, Thackrey refused to accept a paid advertisement appealing for funds for the Irgun due to a split between the Irgun and the Israeli government after the recent War. Although Thackrey supported Israel, he feared the Irgun would use the funds to start a civil war that would doom Israel. Declaring that while he mourned "bitterly and deeply" those killed in the Altalena Affair, he said, "I would mourn the death of Israel even more, and all of my days. I cannot and shall not deliberately assist in a course which I am convinced would promote that monumental graveyard."

== Family ==
His son, Ted Thackrey Jr. (1918?–2001), whose stepmother was Dorothy Schiff, later worked as a reporter for The Wichita Eagle in Wichita, Kansas, before joining the Los Angeles Examiner in the 1950s. He went on to the Los Angeles Times in 1968, eventually becoming a rewrite man. He died in July 2001.
