= Ralph Ingersoll (PM publisher) =

American writer, editor, and publisher

Ralph McAllister Ingersoll (December 8, 1900 in New Haven, Connecticut – March 8, 1985 in Miami Beach, Florida) was an American writer, editor, and publisher. He is best known as founder and publisher of PM, a short-lived 1940s New York City left-wing daily newspaper that was financed by Chicago millionaire Marshall Field III.

== Biography ==
Ingersoll went to Hotchkiss School, graduated from Yale University's Sheffield Scientific School and became a mining engineer in California, Arizona and Mexico. In 1923 he went to New York with the intention of becoming a writer.

He worked as a reporter for the New York American from 1923 to 1925, and then joined The New Yorker where he was managing editor from 1925 to 1930. He had been hired by the New Yorker founder and editor Harold Ross a few months after the magazine commenced publication; Ross inadvertently spilled an inkwell on Ingersoll's new light suit (various sources claim it was either white or pale gray) during the job interview, then, in embarrassment, offered him the job. As Ingersoll left his office, he heard Ross mumble to his secretary: "Jesus Christ, I hire anybody." According to his biographer, Roy Hoopes, Ingersoll "was one of the original guiding spirits of The New Yorker. He held it together during its first five years."

In 1930 Ingersoll went to Time Inc. as managing editor of Time-Life publications, and devised the formula of business magazine Fortune, eventually becoming general manager of the company. One of his most important assignments at Fortune was a detailed history of The New Yorker and its business. The scrutiny that Ingersoll gave Ross and his employees, which included mention of their foibles and salaries, initiated a feud between Ross and Henry Luce, publisher of Time and Fortune, culminating in a famed profile of Luce by Wolcott Gibbs that ran in The New Yorker in 1936, which lampooned both Luce and "Timestyle", the inverted writing style for which Time was (in)famous. Luce retaliated by having caricaturist Al Hirschfeld draw an image of Joseph Stalin over a picture of Ross.

PM started on June 18, 1940, with $1.5 million of capital, a fraction of the $10 million that Ingersoll initially sought. Unlike in usual U.S. practice, PM ran no advertising, and editorials did not appear every day; when they did, they were signed by an individual, initially Ingersoll himself, instead of anonymously coming from the paper itself. Sometimes these editorials took over the front page. His first editorial took a forthright stand on World War II which was already under way in Europe: "We are against people who push other people around," he wrote, demanding material U.S. support for the nations opposing Nazi Germany and Fascist Italy. Ingersoll visited Britain in October and wrote a series for the paper that was published as an instant book fixup.

The papers' first year was an overall success, although the paper was in some financial trouble: its circulation of 100,000–200,000 was insufficient. Marshall Field III had become the paper's funder; quite unusually, he was a "silent partner" in this continually money-losing undertaking.

The 41-year-old Ingersoll was drafted into the military; when he returned after the war, he found a paper that was less lively and well-written than it had been under his leadership, and with the pro-communist and anti-communist liberals writing at cross purposes. The paper never quite recovered and in June, 1948, with PM on the brink of folding, Field sold a majority interest to attorney Bartley Crum and editor Joseph Fels Barnes, who renamed it the New York Star. It ceased publication eight months later, in February, 1949.

Ingersoll later wrote numerous books about his service in World War II.

It has recently been suggested, based on research, that Ingersoll may have been the originator, chief advocate and mission planner of the tactical deception unit formed by the US Army during the war and deployed in the European Theater of Operations known formally as the 23rd Headquarters Special Troops and colloquially as the Ghost Army of World War II. By 1943, with the rank of CPT, he was stationed in London and worked on strategic deceptions, including Operation Fortitude, as part of the Special Plans Branch, 12th US Army Group. Then, according to his own accounts, he developed the idea of creating a tactical deception unit that could imitate multiple different units in Europe. Rick Beyer, author of The Ghost Army of World War Two, says that "he referred to the unit as 'my con artists,' and said its creation was 'my only original contribution to my country's armed forces. . . . When I first dreamed it up, I considered it one of my more improbable dreams, but damned if the Pentagon planners didn't buy it whole.'"

In the 1950s Ingersoll acquired and managed several newspapers. His company, Ingersoll Publications, founded in 1957, was taken over by his son Ralph M. Ingersoll Jr. in 1982 after he had bought his father out in a deal that left them no longer on speaking terms.
