= Thomas Burton O'Connor =

US journalist and editor

Tom O'Connor (July 28, 1914 – July 24, 1952) was an American journalist and editor. He wrote for the Harvard Journal, Los Angeles Daily News, New York PM, and the New York Daily Compass. He was among the first television anchors on CBS. In 1952, he was called before the House Un-American Activities Committee (HUAC). He died of a sudden heart attack two months after testifying before HUAC.

== Early life and education ==
O’Connor was born in Nampa, Idaho. He attended Wilson High in Long Beach, California after moving there with his family.

== Career ==
O'Connor attended Harvard University during 1932–36 and was the 1935 president of the Harvard Journal. He graduated with a Bachelors of Science. Returning to California in 1935, he worked for The Los Angeles Post Record as a reporter and editor. He returned to Harvard to complete one semester of schooling in 1936 and then returned to the Los Angeles Post Record which then became a 24-hour newspaper called the News where he stayed until late spring 1940. He served as the president of the Los Angeles Newspaper Guild in the late 1930s. In 1940, he moved to New York and joined the staff of the liberal-leaning newspaper PM where he worked as city editor among other positions. In 1941, he won the Hayward Brown Memorial Award for series on conditions in the coal mining industry.

After Pearl Harbor, he interviewed American-born Japanese residents of New York and wrote about their disgust at Japanese aggression. He left the paper to serve in the merchant marines for a little less than a year. He joined the New York Daily Compass in May 1948 as a reporter and went on to become the managing editor. In 1945, he joined CBS as one of their first television news anchors. On Thursday, May 22, 1952 O'Connor was called before the House Un-American Activities Committee after being named first by Charles W. Judson and then by Alice K. Bennett. O'Connor invoked the 5th amendment and didn't name any names.

Two months later, on July 24 he died of a heart attack while watching the Democratic National Convention in his office at the Daily Compass.

== Personal life ==
O'Connor married Ann Henry in October 1941. They had two children together, Shannon and Daniel.
