= Bartley Crum =

American lawyer and writer (1900-1959)

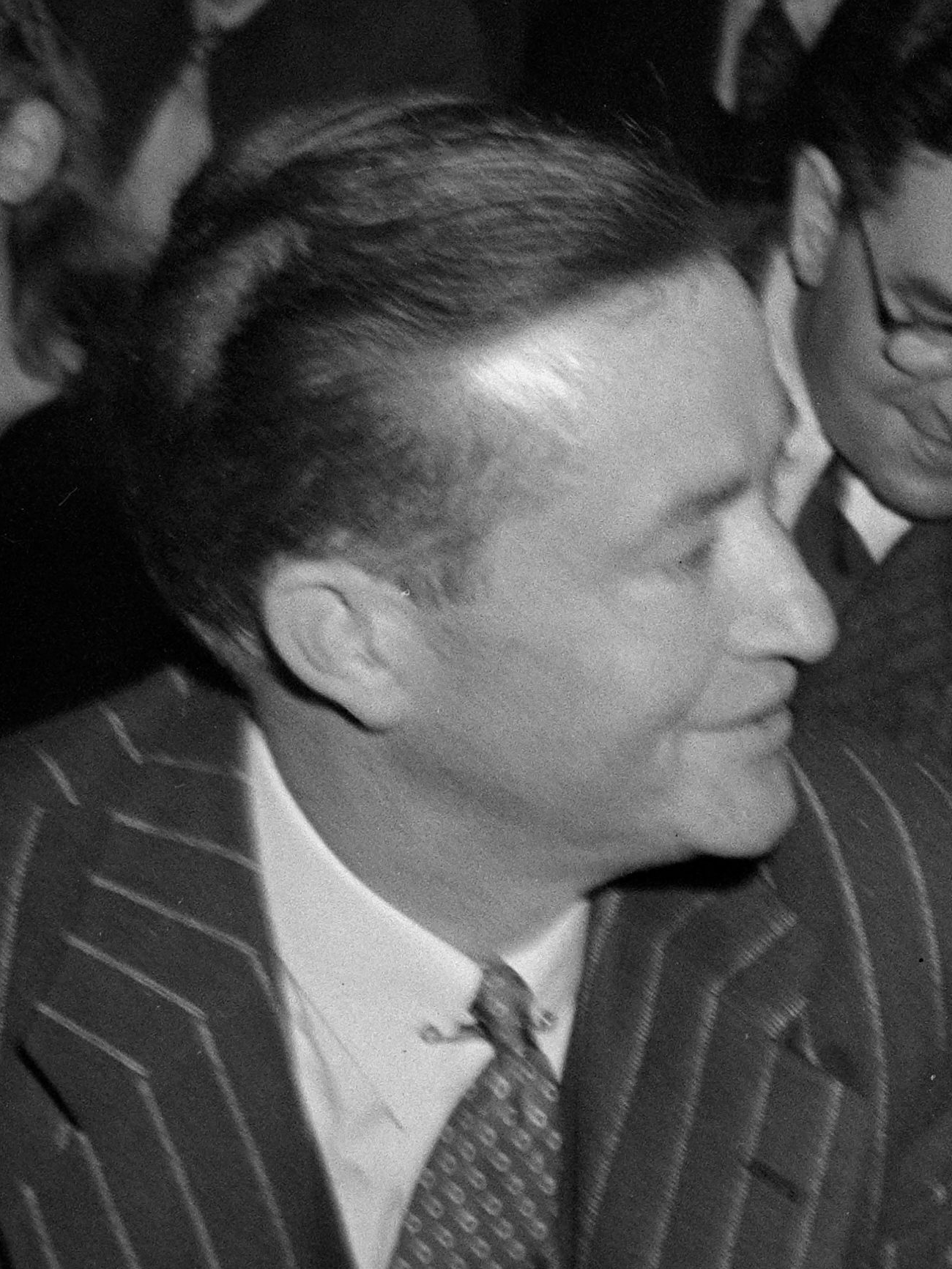
- Crum in 1945
- Born: November 28, 1900; Sacramento, California, U.S.
- Died: December 9, 1959 (aged 59); New York City, New York, U.S.
- Education: University of California at Berkeley
- Occupations: Attorney, activist
- Years active: 1933–1959
- Era: New Deal, McCarthyism
- Known for: Hollywood Ten defense, Rita Hayworth divorce
- Notable work: Behind the Silken Curtain (1947)
- Political party: Republican, Independent Republicans for Roosevelt
- Board member of: National Lawyers Guild, Anglo-American Committee of Inquiry, Lawyers Committee for Justice in Palestine
- Spouse: Anna Gertrude Bosworth
- Children: Patricia Bosworth, Bartley Crum Jr.
- Parent(s): James Henry Crum, Emma Cavanaugh

Bartley Crum (November 28, 1900 – December 9, 1959) was an American lawyer who became prominent as a member of the Anglo-American Committee of Inquiry, for his book on that experience, and for defending targets of HUAC, particularly the Hollywood Ten and Paul Robeson.

== Background ==
Bartley Cavanaugh Crum was born on November 28, 1900, in Sacramento, California, the son of James Henry Crum and Emma Cavanaugh. He was raised Roman Catholic. In 1922, he received a BA and in 1924 a JD from the University of California at Berkeley.

== Career ==
Crum started his career as a teacher of English and International Law at UC Berkeley.

=== Neylan and Hearst ===
In 1924, Crum joined the law offices of John Francis Neylan, chief attorney for newspaper magnate William Randolph Hearst. As a Hearst lawyer, Crum helped defend Clarence Darrow in 1933. "Darrow taught me more law than I had known before", Crum said later.

In 1934, Neylan, "along with Bartley Crum, a young associate who functioned as an administrative aide", called newspaper publishers together to take a stand against the 1934 West Coast Longshore Strike and accompanying San Francisco General strike. According to ex-Popular Front, liberal journalist Sidney Roger, Neylan was the "mastermind" for the shipping industry to break the strikes by convincing Bay area newspapers of a "Communist plot", during which time Crum "became a strong supporter of the longshore union and Harry Bridges".

=== Kenny and NLG ===
In 1938, Crum left Neylan and set up a law office with Philip Ehrlich and David A. Silver. In 1938 or 1939, he joined the National Lawyers Guild (NLG) as an organization of progressive and communist lawyers to counter the conservative American Bar Association, probably at the behest of friend and fellow liberal Republican Robert W. Kenny. In 1939, Crum helped defend Harry Bridges in one of his deportation hearings. He also criticized the US policy during the Spanish Civil War and its aftermath. In 1942, Crum was a vice president of NLG's local chapter. In 1943, Crum served as president of the NLG's San Francisco chapter. In 1943–1944, Crum sponsored American Youth for Democracy.

=== Wendell Willkie ===
Crum worked in the 1940 and 1944 campaigns of U.S. presidential candidate Wendell Willkie. In 1941, he became chairman for the Western US of "Fight for Freedom, Inc.", a group favoring intervention in World War II (in alignment with Willkie).

In 1943, Crum served as special counsel on FDR's Fair Employment Practices Committee. He also served as Willkie's liaison to FDR via David Niles. When Willkie failed to get the Republican presidential nomination in 1944, Crum helped form "Independent Republicans for Roosevelt" and campaigned for FDR, occasionally with Harry S. Truman.

In October 1944, Crum served as an attorney for Harry Bridges. In November 1944, Crum sent a letter to the Civil Service Commission on behalf of Larry Resner on the subject of loyalty charges.

On March 18, 1945, Crum signed a statement issued by the National Federation for Constitutional Liberties, advertised in the Daily Worker. In September 1945, Crum chaired a rally of the Joint Anti-Fascist Refugee Committee (JAFRC), which featured an overseas call from Harold Laski. By year end, Crum's clients included Owl Drug, United Drug, and Borden's Milk. He was national vice president of the NLG, national co-chair of the CIO-PAC, and California chair of United China War Relief. Rumor had it that he would succeed Harold L. Ickes as United States Secretary of the Interior.

=== Anglo-American Committee of Inquiry ===
On January 1, 1946, Crum accepted an invitation to join the Anglo-American Commission of Inquiry on Palestine (AACIP) that advised President Harry Truman to support the opening of the British Mandate of Palestine to unrestricted Jewish immigration and to ease restrictions on Jewish land purchases. On February 17, 1946, Crum announced in Vienna, Austria, that he expected to see "mass suicides" if European Jews did not receive permission to emigrate to Palestine. His book, Behind the Silken Curtain a Personal Account of Anglo-American Diplomacy in Palestine and the Middle East was published by Simon & Schuster in 1947. "He charged the British were up to their traditional divide-and-conquer policies." When Clark Clifford, along with David Niles, took up the issue of recognition of the State of Israel, he received "advice and assistance" from Crum, Eliahu Epstein, and Max Lowenthal. Israeli State Archives show that on May 11, 1948, Crum visited President Harry S. Truman: "Crum [Bartley Crum] saw President yesterday, returned fairly optimistic." Crum became chairman of the national council of Americans for Haganah, whose director was David Wahl.

=== Hollywood Ten ===
As vice president of the NLG's state chapter and with Kenny as president, Crum entered into increasingly prominent issues involving the civil rights of left-leaning people. In 1946, Crum answered Paul Robeson in his "crusade call" and endorsed the American Crusade Against Lynching (ACAL) organization. The ACAL had been accused of socialist and communist connections, which led to the organization, including Crum, coming under close watch by the Federal Bureau of Investigation (FBI). The FBI tapped Crum's phones, opened his mail, and shadowed him constantly.

In 1946, Crum was a member of the national board of the Independent Citizens Committee of the Arts, Sciences and Professions (ICCASP), which also had a large branch in California, the Hollywood Independent Citizens Committee of the Arts, Sciences and Professions. On July 9, 1946, Crum appeared on a radio program called "What's On Your Mind About Russia?" In 1946–1947, Crum was vice chairman and a sponsor of the National Committee to Win the Peace, which joined another group that Crum sponsored called the Committee for a Democratic Far Eastern Policy. At the end of 1946, as ICCASP merged with National Citizens Political Action Committee to form the Progressive Citizens Association (PCA), Crum became the PCA's national vice chairman.

In 1947, Crum served as attorney for some of the so-called "Hollywood Ten" (originally the "Unfriendly Nineteen"), subpoenaed to appear before the House Un-American Activities Committee. National Lawyers Guild members formed the core team, originally Charles Katz and Ben Margolis, followed by Crum and Robert W. Kenny, followed by Martin Popper in Washington and Sam Rosenwein in New York.

During pre-hearing preparation, the Nineteen and their lawyers negotiated and agreed to a strategy of unanimity as well as a pledge to cite the First Amendment of the United States Constitution. His daughter recalled:

I first learned about the Hollywood blacklist on Nov. 24, 1947. I remember the exact moment. I was standing with my father, Bartley Crum, by a phone booth near Union Square in San Francisco, feeding him nickels and dimes while he made a series of intense phone calls to Dore Schary, who was the head of MGM.
If you're wondering why he had to make those calls from a pay phone, it's because our home phone was bugged by the F.B.I. At that point I was too young to quite grasp the significance of those bugged calls, but I did know that my father had been one of six lawyers who had just defended the Hollywood 10 in front of the House Un-American Activities Committee (HUAC) in Washington.

She also recorded differences between communist and non-communist lawyers (in which latter camp Crum was), contrary to other accounts of greater unity among lawyers.

=== New York Star ===
In 1948, due to blowback from the HUAC Hollywood hearings, Crum moved his family from the San Francisco Bay area to New York City.

In 1948, Crum's name appeared as a member of the board of directors of the California Labor School, listed as a subversive organization by US Attorney General Tom C. Clark in December 1947 on the Attorney General's List of Subversive Organizations.

In May 1948, Joseph Starobin, foreign news editor of the Daily Worker, referred in print to Crum's "unquestionably progressive career". In early June 1948, Crum appeared before the American Russian Institute and expressed his "Soviet sympathy" (according to the FBI). In June 1948, Crum bought a major interest in the dying PM newspaper with Joseph Fels Barnes from Marshall Field III, who maintained a minority interest. On June 23, 1948, they renamed PM as the New York Star. Also in the 1948 United States presidential election, he supported Harry S. Truman (Democrat) over Thomas E. Dewey (Republican) and Henry A. Wallace (Progressive).

In January 1949, the Star folded, which helped undermine Crum's personal finances. During that year, Crum joined Hays, Podell, Algase, Crum & Feuer with offices at 39 Broadway.

=== Continued politics ===
In 1950, Crum's name came up in Congress during investigation into Truman advisor Max Lowenthal. On September 15, 1950, Lowenthal appeared before the House Un-American Activities Committee, commonly known as "HUAC", one of whose members was Richard Nixon, co–author of the Mundt-Nixon Bill. Already in August 1950, HUAC had re-subpoenaed four witness who had been part of Whittaker Chambers's Ware Group: Lee Pressman, Nathan Witt, Charles Kramer and John Abt. The committee had asked both Pressman and Kramer whether they knew Lowenthal; both confirmed. Lowenthal brought former U.S. Senator Burton K. Wheeler as counsel.

After reviewing his curriculum vitae, the committee tried to link him with known Communist Party members and organizations. Crum was one of the persons claimed to be a member of the Communist Party or associated with it.

In the 1952 United States presidential election, Crum supported Adlai E. Stevenson (Democrat) over Dwight D. Eisenhower (Republican).

In 1953, syndicated columnist Westbrook Pegler wrote of Crum:

I telephoned Bartley Crum, a California lawyer with offices in New York and a Red record so bad that he hangs his head in shame, and asked whether Lowenthal had had any real connection with the Hollywood Reds and their friends, the so-called Hollywood Committee on the First Amendment ... Incidentally, he became counsel for Drew Pearson in one of his dragging suits against me but finally came into my lawyer's office to say that he had never forsaken his Catholicism and that he was ashamed of his Red record. During the examination of the Hollywood Reds, Crum consulted Lowenthal because he regarded the man as an expert on the procedures and the authority of congressional committees. Crum says Lowenthal told him the best course was to tell the committee frankly whether this or that one was a member of the Communist Party. By contrast with this advice Lowenthal himself in his appearance before the House committee was remarkably vague on many matters. However, on careful review of his old testimony I conclude that my early impression was incorrect that he positively withheld the names of "organizations" which arranged for his appointment to a job on Gen. Clay's staff in Germany just after the war. He said there were five such "organizations" and named one, but the committee wandered off and did not press him to identify the others. It was not up to him to volunteer the information and I know the committee regarded the subject as a hot potato. He did admit knowing a number of the most notorious Reds of the movement but his voluntary estimate of the political character of his friend, Crum, is laughable in view of Crum's own admission to my attorneys and to Alfred Kohlberg, one of the most effective Red-baiters in the country, that he was ashamed of his activity in the Red movement, Lowenthal said: "I had confidence in his true Americanism." Thus, Lowenthal's notion of true Americanism is peculiar or his knowledge of Crum's activities up to then was faulty.

=== Teamsters involvement ===
In 1958, Crum became involved in a controversy with Jimmy Hoffa, head of the International Brotherhood of Teamsters ("Teamsters"). He had been trying to collect $210,000 in legal fees from the Teamsters for a client (lawyers represented by Godfrey P. Schmidt). He testified in before the United States Select Committee on Improper Activities in the Labor or Management Field.

== Death ==
In 1947 (prior to the HUAC hearings), Crum first took a combination of alcohol and barbiturates, from which he was revived. In the early hours of February 9, 1949, a few days after the New York Star folded, Crum made a second suicide attempt, again with pills and alcohol. Doctors who treated him included Gregory Zilboorg, a psychiatrist who also treated Lillian Hellman.

By the late 1950s, long labeled a subversive, Crum had lost most of his clients. Unable to cope with stress from the harassment, he killed himself on December 9, 1959, by washing down an entire bottle of seconal with whisky. His wife discovered his body at their home at 165 East Eightieth Street, New York City.

== Personal life ==
Crum married Anna Gertrude Bosworth, an author of novels and (later) a cookbook. They had two children. The younger, son Bartley Crum Jr., committed suicide in 1953 by shooting himself with his grandfather's gun in his freshman year at Reed College. The older, daughter Patricia Bosworth, became first a successful actress and then even more successful writer. In 1997, she wrote a family memoir, Anything Your Little Heart Desires, reminiscing about her father. In 2017, she wrote a second memoir about her father, brother, and husbands, called The Men in My Life: Love and Art in 1950s Manhattan. She died from complications of the 2020 coronavirus pandemic.

In 1941, Crum moved his family from Berkeley to 763 Bay Street, San Francisco. In 1945, they moved again to 2626 Green Street, San Francisco. In 1948, they moved to New York City, where they lived at several addresses.

== Legacy ==
In its obituary of Crum in 1959, the New York Times quoted Crum's stance on outlawing the CPUSA:

It is unconstitutional and utterly stupid for government to attempt to prevent people from thinking or believing as they wish ... As a non-Communist, I think the most effective answer to the Marxists is to make our democracy work by providing equality and job opportunities for all, strengthening the trade unions, and raising the standard of living.

Assessing his daughter's 1997 memoir, the New York Times wrote that she remembered him as:

a hero-daddy who championed just causes, the doughty fighter for civil rights who defended the Hollywood Ten; the politically connected lawyer, friend of Harry S. Truman and Wendell L. Willkie; the member of the Anglo-American Committee of Inquiry Into Palestine in 1946 who told the world about the plight of the Jewish death-camp survivors in displaced-persons camps and fought for their safe passage to Palestine against British and Arab double-dealing ... [Yet his] addiction to political causes and big legal retainers exercised a centrifugal pull away from the family he certainly loved.

She also admitted, "My father informed on two colleagues already known to be Communists." In 1978, during an interview regarding who came up with the idea of arguing the First over Fifth Amendment in October 1947, Carey McWilliams said:

I don't know exactly. As I said, the Hollywood Ten were represented by brilliant lawyers: Bob Kenny and Bartley Crum and Charles Katz. They certainly explained to them, I'm sure, that they could plead the Fifth Amendment. But they didn't want to. They didn't want to. They were a notably independent group of people; and I would say in some cases more than independent: stubborn!--like John Howard Lawson, who was a hard man to push around. They were determined to take this position, and it was a correct position to take. The problem was that they did not succeed, in my judgment, in getting across what their real position was. It wasn't their fault that they couldn't get it across. There was shouting, and the hearings were confused, and all the rest of it. But they had a sound position.

As of late 1999, Boston University houses many of Crum's papers in the archive of his daughter.

In 2014, Larry Ceplair and Christopher Trumbo (son of Dalton Trumbo) criticized the portrait of Crum by daughter Patricia Bosworth in her memoir Anything Your Little Heart Desires over the issue of "unanimity" demanded among the Nineteen and their lawyers. They argue that Crum must have known about their strategy of unanimity, whereas Bosworth claimed he only learned later. Crum was no "innocent dupe", nor was his client Dmytryk. They support their critique by citing Crum's long-term membership in the National Lawyers Guild, with its strong communist partisans.

== Works ==
Crum's book was the "President's favorite" (referring to Truman). Albert Kahn of the Worker also endorsed the book, as did the New Masses and American Youth for Democracy.

- Behind the Silken Curtain: A Personal Account of Anglo-American Diplomacy in Palestine and the Middle East (1947)

== See also ==
- Patricia Bosworth
- Harry Bridges
- Robert W. Kenny
- Paul Robeson
- Hollywood Ten
- New York Star (1948–1949)
