= Rudolf Sonneborn =

American businessman (1898–1986)

Rudolf Sonneborn, during a trip to the Negev, 1950.

Rudolf Goldschmid Sonneborn (June 22, 1898 – June 1, 1986) was a New York industrialist and oil executive. He was a longtime leader of the American Zionist Movement and one of the most prominent fund-raisers for a future state of Israel in the 1940's and 1950's and onetime president of The State of Israel Bond Drive. He purchased 1957 Socony Mobil's Israel operations and renamed it Sonol Israel Ltd. - it remains today one of the leading oil companies in Israel.

== Life ==
A native of Baltimore, Sonneborn was “old money”, being the grandson of an immigrant who became a prosperous textile manufacturer. He studied, like his father, at the elite Johns Hopkins University until being commissioned into the fledgling Naval Air Corps in 1917 to train as a Naval aviator (United States). World War I ended before he finished training. After his discharge he joined a mission to Palestine and remained in West Asia for several years. In 1920 he returned to the U.S. and visited courses in business administration at Harvard University and again left without graduating to in the early 1920s. Once in business, he turned the family concern successfully from textiles towards petrochemicals and joined his uncle Ferdinand Sonneborn who was then President of the L. Sonneborn and Sons oil and chemical concern in New York City. Instead of trying to compete with the big fuel and gasoline companies, he led the business into specialty products as white mineral oils, sulfonates and motor oils. Following Ferdinand Sonneborn's death in 1953, Rudolf Sonneborn became its President. He was a founder of the Twenty-Five Year Club of the Petroleum Industry and also served as President of the Oil Trades Association of New York before a stroke forced him to step aside for Henry Sonneborn III. He married into the German Jewish aristocracy, becoming the fourth husband of New York Post owner and publisher Dorothy Schiff, the granddaughter of financier Jacob Schiff.

In 1919, at the age of twenty, Sonneborn visited Palestine from January to August, acting as the 'Secretary to the Zionist Commission'. He was investigating the feasibility of creating an independent Jewish State of Israel in Mandatory Palestine (1920-1948), achieved 29 years later on 14 May 1948. A detailed account of his trip was recorded in 'Letters Home'.

Sonneborn was known for his friendships, going back to 1919, with such future Israeli leaders as David Ben-Gurion and Chaim Weizman. Through them, his name became prominently linked with the ship Exodus and other American efforts to smuggle supplies, materiel and weapons across the ocean to the Jewish community in Palestine.

== Sonneborn and the secret of Makhon Z’ ==
On July 1, 1945, David Ben-Gurion asked a small gathering of American-Jewish activists at Sonneborn's apartment to send supplies to the Jewish community and its military force, the Haganah.

== Makhon Z’ – The Secret Project for Acquiring Arms for the Yishuv ==
The Makhon Z’ (Z’ Institute) was a covert operation in 1945 conceived by Reuven Zaslani (later Reuven Shiloah), the founder and the first head of Mossad, aimed at establishing a network for acquiring military equipment and weaponry for the Yishuv in preparation for the anticipated conflict following the end of the British Mandate for Palestine. The project received full backing from David Ben-Gurion, who viewed it as a crucial element in preparing the defense forces for the 1947–1948 civil war in Mandatory Palestine and the upcoming War of Independence.

== Background and Establishment ==
Towards the end of World War II, the leadership of the Yishuv realized that the British would continue to enforce the restrictive White Paper policies, preventing unrestricted Jewish immigration and limiting the development of Jewish defense forces. Zaslani, a close advisor to Ben-Gurion, argued that the Yishuv needed to prepare for a dual confrontation: first against the British and then against the Arab states following their withdrawal. Ben-Gurion accepted his assessment and tasked him with determining the essential resources required for coming wars.

== The Secret Meeting in New York and the Formation of the Network ==
Zaslani orchestrated a clandestine meeting at the New York residence of Rudolf Sonneborn, attended by Ben-Gurion, Eliezer Kaplan, and seventeen prominent leaders of the American Jewish community. In this meeting, Ben-Gurion laid out his vision for the establishment of a Jewish state, Zaslani detailed the military necessities for achieving this goal, and Kaplan discussed the financial resources required.

At the end of the discussion, the participants resolved to establish the "Sonneborn Institute", which operated covertly within the United States. This network mobilized millions of dollars to purchase arms, ammunition, machinery for weapons production, and other military supplies to ensure the Yishuv’s readiness for the imminent armed struggle.

== Makhon Z’ Operations and Its Impact on the War ==
For nearly two years, the network functioned in secrecy, circumventing legal restrictions that prohibited the transfer of military equipment to non-governmental entities. Following the withdrawal of British forces, Makhon Z’ went into full operation, and the weapons and equipment procured through this initiative played a crucial role in strengthening the Jewish paramilitary forces in Palestina. The supplies obtained through the institute enabled the rapid organization of an effective fighting force, significantly influencing the outcome of the battles in 1948 and securing the Yishuv’s military advantage in the War of Independence.

The group became a secretive, nationwide organization led by Sonnenborn, Materials for Israel, also known as the Sonneborn Institute.

In 1957 Sonneborn acquired Socony Mobil's Israel operations and renamed it Sonol Israel Ltd. It remains today one of the leading oil companies in Israel.

Sonneborn was active in business and Zionist causes until a stroke curtailed his activities in 1959. The family company he was heading, L. Sonneborn Sons Inc., then was merged into the Witco Corporation, but kept its own identity and Sonneborn remained a Witco director until retiring at age 70. He died at his estate in Danbury, Connecticut. He was 87 years old and lived in Manhattan.
