= Dolly Hall =

American film producer

- Born: Dorothy Theresa Hall; April 26, 1960 (age 65)
- Occupation: Film producer
- Spouse: John Kochman
- Parent(s): Diana Lynn; Mortimer W. Hall
- Family: Dorothy Schiff (grandmother)

Dorothy Theresa Hall (born April 26, 1960) is an American film producer.

== Biography ==
Hall has produced films including The Wedding Banquet (1993), The Incredibly True Adventure of Two Girls in Love (1995), All Over Me (1997), High Art (1998) and 54 (1998). In 1998, Variety named Hall as one of their top ten "Producers to Watch". Also that year, she received the Frameline Award from the San Francisco International Lesbian & Gay Film Festival for her longstanding service to the lesbian and gay community. In 1999 she shared a nomination for an Independent Spirit Award for her work on High Art.

== Personal life ==
Hall is the eldest daughter of late actress Diana Lynn and Mortimer W. Hall, son of publisher Dorothy Schiff. In 2001, she married John Kochman, a vice president at StudioCanal Image whom she met in 1999 while looking for financial backing for The Girl.

== Filmography ==
- 1991: Triple Bogey on a Par Five Hole
- 1992: Breaking and Entering
- 1993: The Wedding Banquet
- 1993: Joey Breaker
- 1995: The Incredibly True Adventure of Two Girls in Love
- 1995: Shao Nu xiao yu
- 1996: Johns
- 1997: All Over Me
- 1997: My Perfect Journey
- 1998: High Art
- 1998: 54
- 1998: Above Freezing
- 2000: Wirey Spindell
- 2000: Famous
- 2000: The Girl
- 2002: Tadpole
- 2002: Just a Kiss
- 2004: Poster Boy
- 2005: Daddy, Daddy USA
- 2006: Five Fingers
