= Kenneth G. Crawford =

American journalist (1902–1983)

Ken Crawford
- Born: Kenneth G. Crawford; May 27, 1902; Sparta, Wisconsin, U.S.
- Died: January 14, 1983 (aged 80)
- Education: Beloit College
- Occupations: Journalist, editor, columnist
- Years active: 1924-1970
- Employer(s): United Press, PM, Newsweek
- Organization: American Newspaper Guild

Kenneth G. Crawford (1902–1983), was an American newspaper and magazine journalist for PM and Newsweek and during a "distinguished career" was a confidant of US presidents from Franklin Delano Roosevelt to Richard M. Nixon.

== Background ==
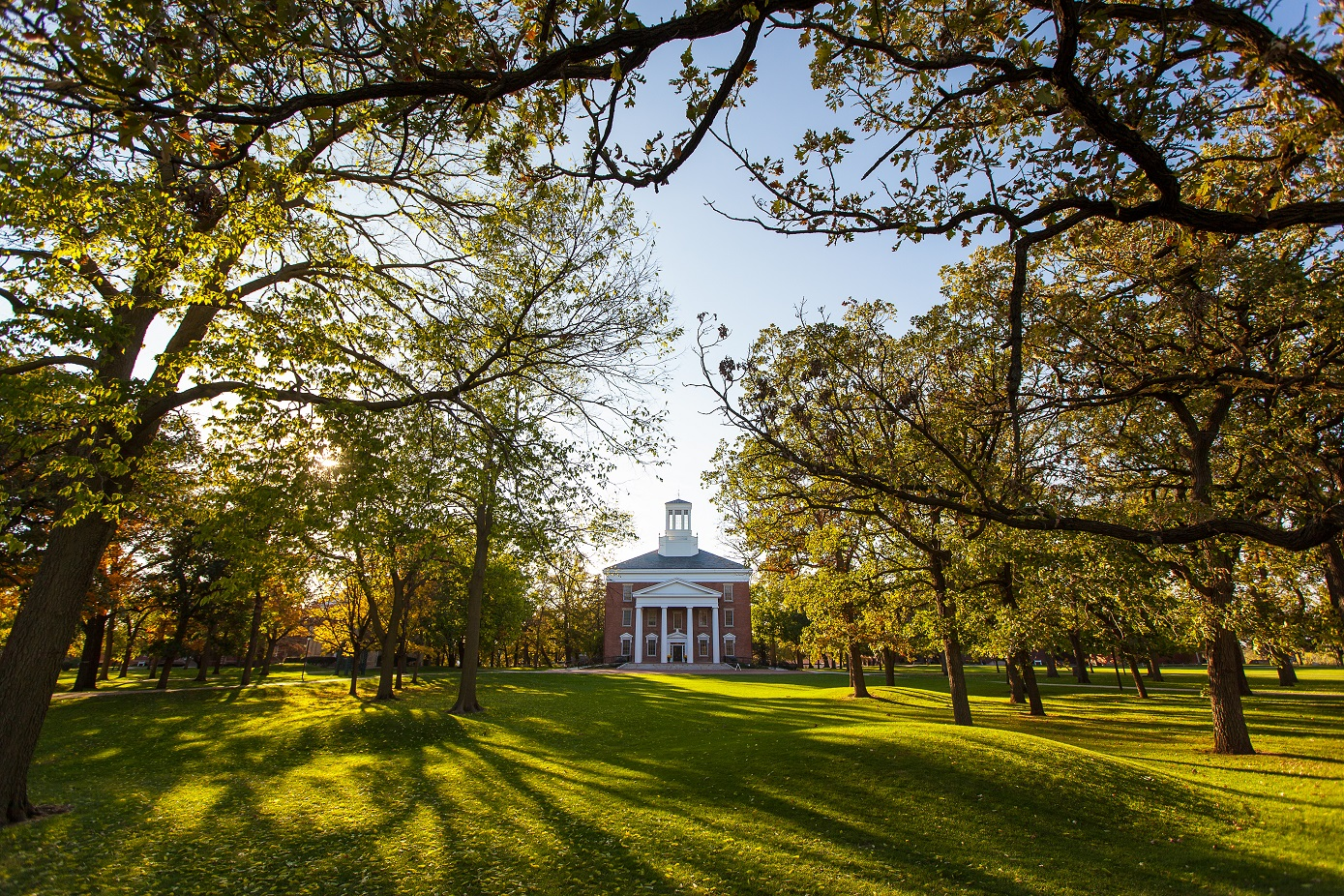
Crawford attended Beloit College (here, Middle College building in 2007)

Kenneth G. Crawford was born on May 27, 1902, in Sparta, Wisconsin, and grew up in Jefferson, Wisconsin. He graduated from Beloit College.

== Career ==
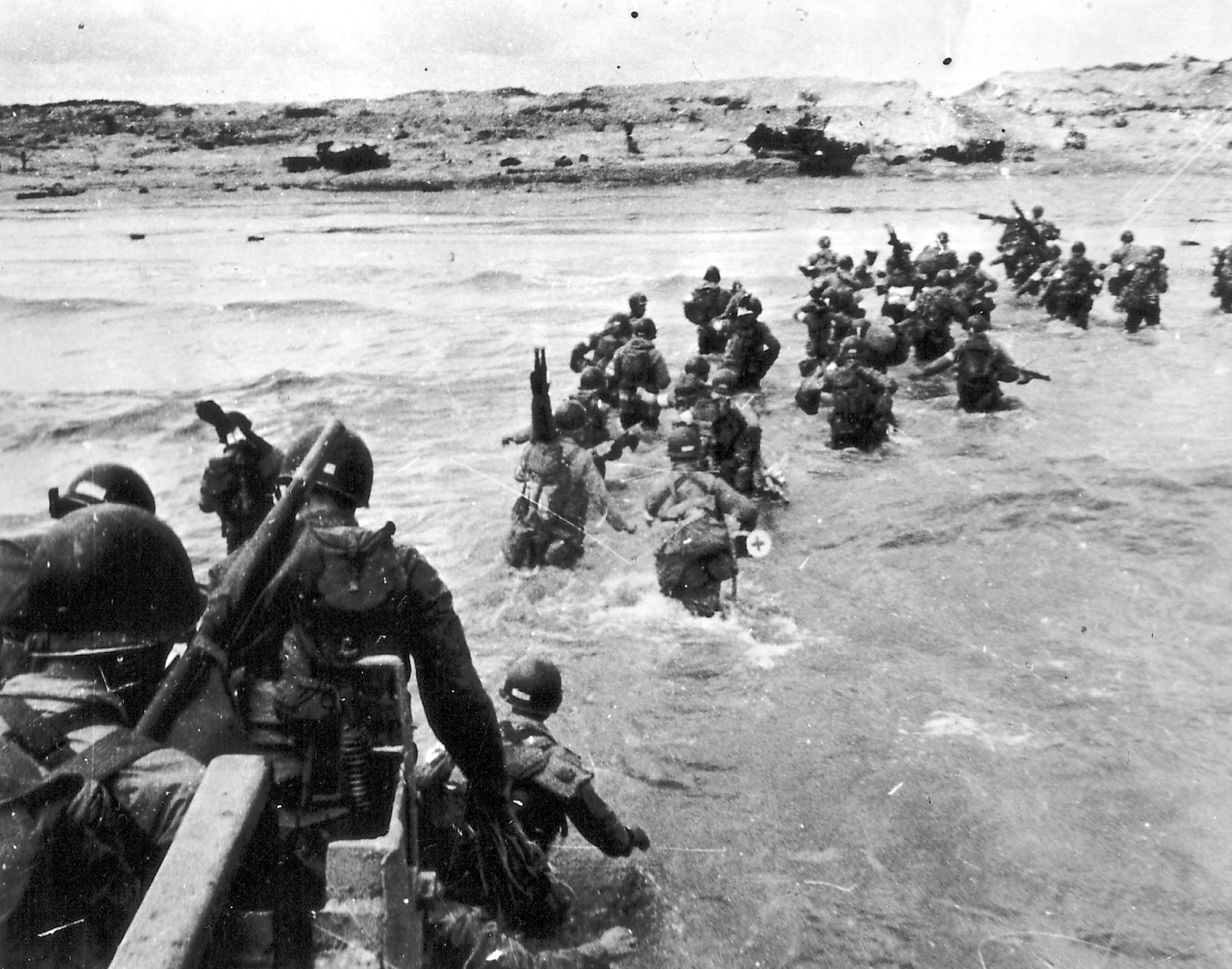
Crawford was the first journalist to land at Normandy at Utah Beach (here showing US soldiers landing on 6 June 1944)

In 1924, fresh out of college, Crawford joined the United Press news wire service in Chicago, St. Louis, Cleveland, Lansing, Indianapolis, and Washington, DC. He moved to the Buffalo Times and then in 1933 returned to Washington with the New York Post. He also contributed to the Saturday Evening Post, The Nation, and The New Republic.

In 1939, Crawford joined PM, a left-liberal newspaper. When Heywood Broun, founder of the American Newspaper Guild, died that year, he succeeded him as the guild's second president.

In 1943, Crawford joined Newsweek and returned to Washington. On D-Day in 1944, he was the first journalist to land at Normandy on Utah Beach with the US 4th Infantry Division. In 1949, he became national affairs editor for the magazine. In 1954, he became Washington bureau chief. In 1961, he became Washington columnist after Philip L. Graham bought Newsweek for the Washington Post-Newsweek group. He retired from Newsweek in 1970. He continued to contribute signed pieces as late as 1976.

== Personal life and death ==
Crawford married Elisabeth Bartholomew; they had a daughter and son.

Ken Crawford died age 80 on January 14, 1983, in New York City of lung cancer.

== Awards ==
- US Navy commendation
- French Liberation Medal

== Legacy ==
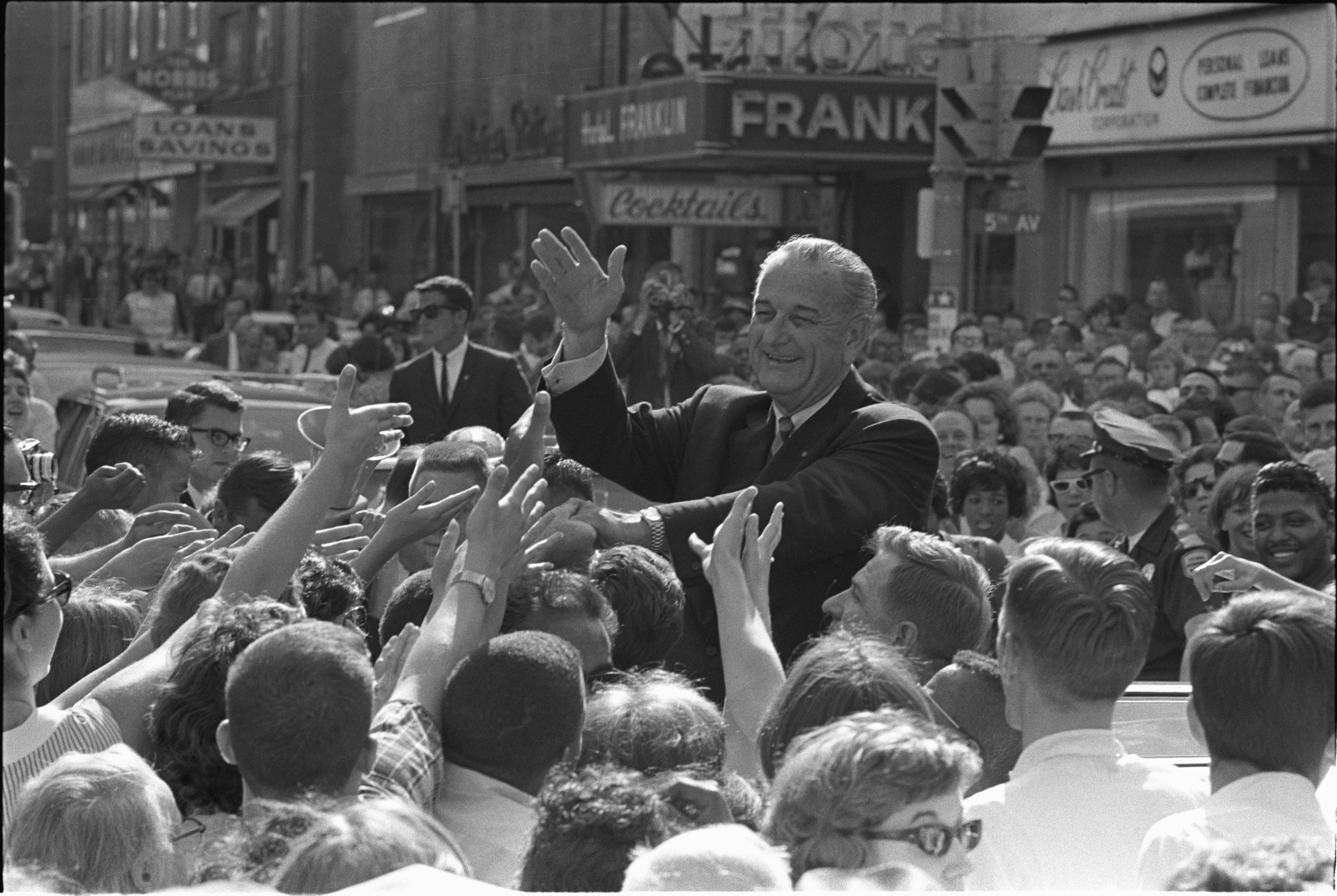
Crawford was confident to presidents from FDR to Nixon including LBJ (here in 1966)

According to his Washington Post obituary, Crawford was one of the few "pundits" trusted by US President Lyndon Baines Johnson. The Post also reported that Ernest Hemingway said of him after his landing at Normandy, "He was beauty brave in action... Everybody loved him and they used to ask me, hard, to try to keep him from getting killed." Post editor Benjamin Bradlee said of him, "Through his dedication to lean, explicit prose, and to fairness and integrity, he set high standards for all of us."

== Works ==
- The Pressure Boys (1939)
- Report on North Africa (1944)
- Presidents Who Have Known Me (1950) - ghostwritten for George Allen
