= New York Star (1948–1949) =

- Owner(s): Bartley Crum, Joseph Fels Barnes
- Staff writers: Max Lerner (contributor)
- Founded: 1948
- Ceased publication: 1948 or 1949
- Political alignment: Progressive
- Language: English
- Headquarters: New York City, U.S.
- Sister newspapers: PM (newspaper) (precedent), The Daily Compass (successor)

The New York Star (1948–1949) was a short-lived newspaper that succeeded the PM newspaper (1940–1948), owned by US attorney Bartley Crum and journalist Joseph Fels Barnes.

== History ==
On June 23, 1948, The New York Times announced the first appearance that day of the New York Star as successor to the PM newspaper. In particular, the Star stressed differences from its predecessor. The Star would be "as independent of the tyranny of slogans and colors as it is of vested interests." In defining its independence, the paper stated it would be neither "red, white, pink, right, left, or center" because such terms had been over-used, "squeezed like lemon rinds". The paper looked forward to continued policies of Franklin Delano Roosevelt and Wendell Willkie. Most strongly, the newspaper said it would stop the "PM technique of combining editorial comment with news stories." Instead, the New York Star would "report the news as honestly and well as skill can manage."

The paper published daily except for Saturdays in 1948 and 1949.

The newspaper ceased publication in January, 1949; media critic A. J. Liebling, in the February 12, 1949, edition of The New Yorker, discussed the closing of the newspaper in a column entitled "Toward a One-Paper Town". Some sources cite a final publication date of Friday, January 28, 1949 (see, e.g., Mary A. Hamilton's book Rising from the Wilderness: J. W. Gitt and His Legendary Newspaper, page 153).

The Daily Compass took over from the Star, with contributor Ted Thackrey as editor and writer I. F. Stone its best known writer.

== Personnel ==
Journalist Joseph Fels Barnes and attorney Bartley Crum (recently famous thanks to his role in defending Hollywood personalities to become known as the "Hollywood Ten") bought majority ownership from Marshall Field III, who retained a minority share.

Leon Shimkin of Simon & Schuster and Pocket Books was the Star's business manager.

Max Lerner, a chief contributor of signed PM editorials in the past, would continue to contribute to the Star. Other contributors included I. F. Stone, Albert Deutsch, Alex Uhl, as well as Myril Axelrod Bennett, Ted Thackrey, Walt Kelly (cartoonist who created Pogo), and Matilda Landsman.

== See also ==
- PM (newspaper)
- Bartley Crum
- Joseph Barnes
- Marshall Field III
- Max Lerner
- Ted Thackrey
- I. F. Stone
