= Ray Platnick =

American photojournalist

Raphael Platnick (March 30, 1917 – November 1986) was an American photojournalist and newspaper photographer.

== Biography ==
Raphael Platnick, known as Ray, was born in 1917, son of Samuel and Sarah (née Graubard) Platnick, and was the brother of Milton and Harriet. He was educated at Hempstead High School, Long Island and took up photography.

== War photographer ==
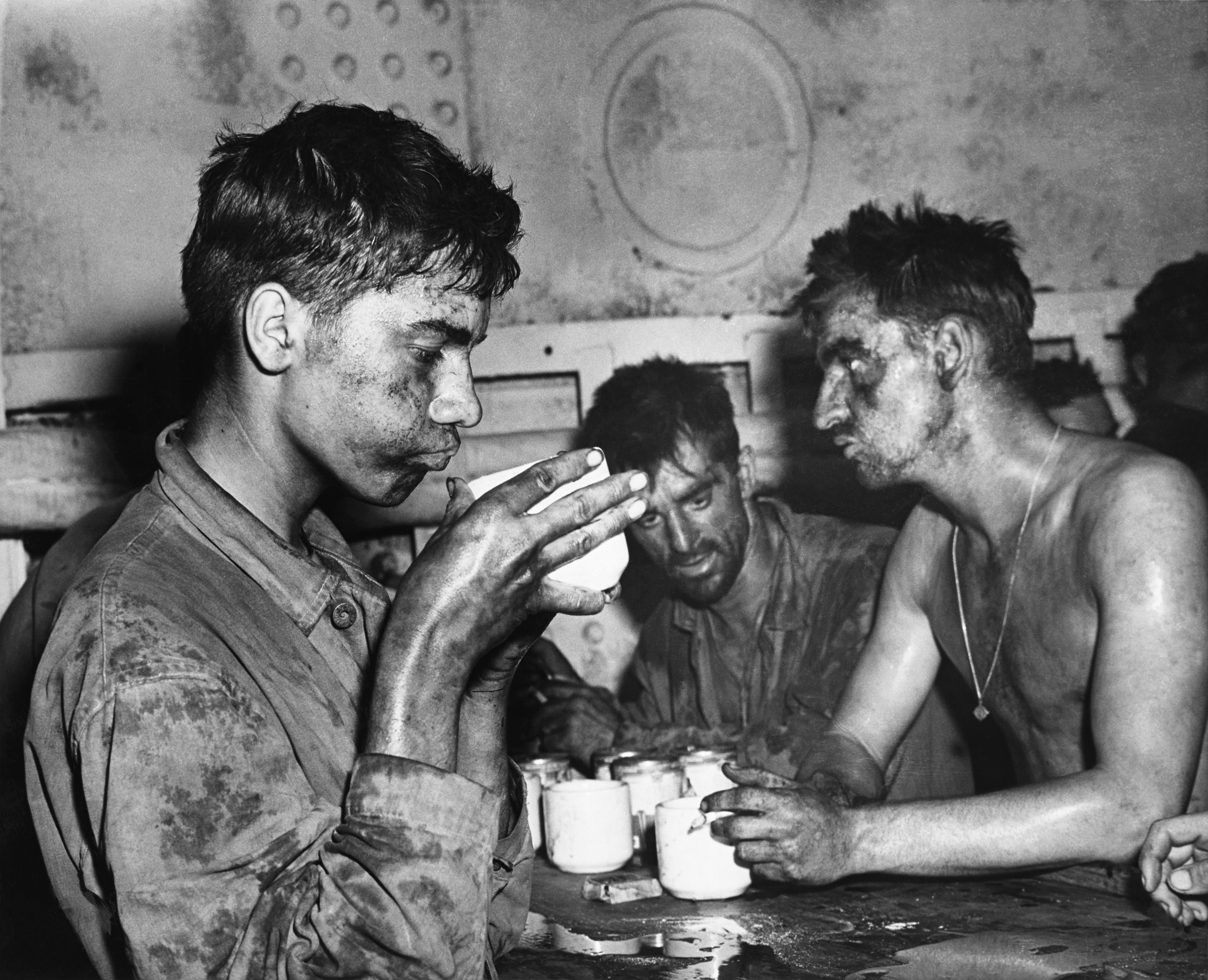
These Marines, begrimed and weary from two days and two nights of fighting, by Ray Platnick

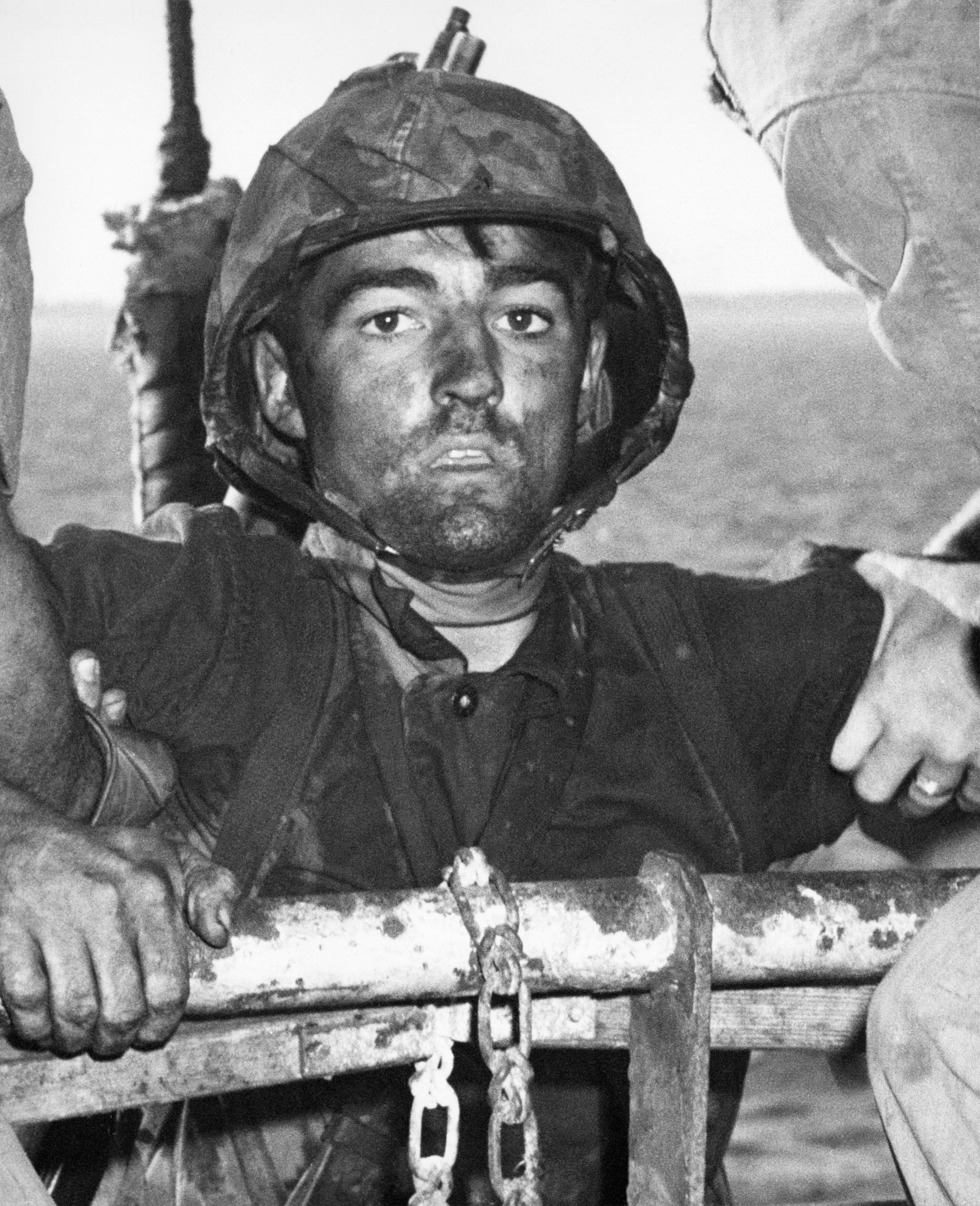
A Marine is hauled aboard the a Coast Guard assault transport after an assault on Eniwetok, February 19, 1944. The uncropped negative shows two ratings lifting the exhausted, sea-sodden and soot-begrimed marine by both arms.

During World War II, as Chief Photographer's Mate Platnick was one of the few Coast Guard combat photographers in the Pacific. He joined the first attackers on the beaches of Makin Island in August 1942 and in February 1944 scouted Japanese gun emplacements during the Battle of Eniwetok to warn Marines if they were occupied. He photographed young marines, exhausted after two days and two nights of fighting, downing mugs of coffee.

A February 19, 1944 portrait attributed to him and made during the Battle, of a Marine boarding a Coast Guard-manned attack transport presents a famous example of the traumatised expression of combat fatigue.

In 1955 Edward Steichen selected Platnick's picture of a slain soldier on Eniwetok for the world-touring Museum of Modern Art exhibition The Family of Man seen by 9 million visitors. The man rests face down with the back of his shirt ripped open, having slid to the bottom of a trench atop which his rifle is planted, bayonet-first, into the sand. Accompanying the photograph were the printed words of Sophocles' rhetorical question; ‘Who is the slayer, who the victim? Speak!’. Cropped and enlarged as a tall ‘exclamation-mark’ at 228.7 × 81.3 cm, the photograph stood by the entrance to a darkened room which housed a giant back-lit colour transparency (in the original in New York, replaced by a monochrome print at other venues) of the Ivy Mike hydrogen bomb test, also on Eniwetok Atoll.

== News photographer ==
Both before and after the war Platnick worked as a news photographer for PM, which had first appeared carrying headlines announcing the Nazi's occupation of Paris, and was staunchly pro-labour. He reported for them on the 1941 Gimbel department store workers’ strike in which the protesters carried distinctive placards in the form of comic-strip frames, made up by the display department, and also that year in an amusing series, he photographed Greenwich Village poets, including Diana Barrett Moulton, Maxwell Bodenheim and Joe Gould, in eccentric poses in front of their verses scrawled on the walls of the Village Arts Center at 1 Charles St. He won the Grand Prize in the Spot News section of the New York Press Photographers’ Association 7th Annual Exhibition for What Makes Sammy Jump? showing news photographers leaping from the path of an enraged bull at the annual Madison Square Gardens Rodeo. Still as a photographer for PM in 1946 he submitted Portrait of a Cop Killer to the Portraits and Personalities section of the New York Press Photographers’ 11th Annual Exhibit.

In the late 40s, Platnick compered a Saturday morning radio program Camera Column of the Air for Radio station WHLI in Hempstead, for which he interviewed professional and amateur photographers for a mostly amateur audience. By 1949, after PM folded, he had moved to the New York Star.

His photographs were taken up by pictorial magazines; LIFE included one of his pictures in a story on the paucity of teachers’ salaries, and in 1973 Ebony magazine re-used one of his 1940s photographs of Joe Lewis.

== Style and legacy ==
Platnick's approach and style was that of the 1940s press corps, pre-35mm, in his invariable use of on-camera flash on a 4”x5” Speed Graphic press camera or similar; the scene is harshly ‘filed’ with artificial light and available light is underexposed to help ‘cut-out’ the subject from any distractions of the background, an effect which would frequently be enhanced by the newspaper retouchers’ airbrushing, as in the case of his 1948 shot Lean Polenberg and Marie Duke issuing traffic summonses, New York, held by the International Center of Photography. His use of instantaneous flash exposure caught fleeting expressions, often to amusing effect, animating what would otherwise be stilted and lifeless situations, as evident in his Jack Gilford at microphone of 1946 Platnick himself and his family were the subject of a photo story by Rae Russel in 1948, showing him with his cameras and in the darkroom.

As a consequence of the standardisation of press photographers’ technique and their similarity, Platnick's photographs could be used to stand in for those of Weegee in The Public Eye, directed by Howard Franklin (October 1992) in which Joe Pesci plays a tough, live-by-his-wits news photographer in the early 1940s. The film is loosely modelled on Weegee, but the story is not, and several photographers' pictures, including Weegee's, but also those of Lisette Model, Mickey Pallas, Wilbert H. Blanche, Irving Haberman, Roger Smith and Charles Steinheimer as well as Platnick's are featured. Director Franklin says he was looking for "edgy, modern, high-contrast 40's" lighting and compositions with the "stark, rather lurid effects of flash, which pick out the central subject while everything around falls off rapidly into darkness".

At the time of his death in November 1986 Platnick was residing in Merrick, Nassau County, New York.
