= David Niles =

American political advisor

- Born: November 23, 1888; Boston, Massachusetts
- Died: September 28, 1952 (aged 63); Boston, Massachusetts
- Education: Harvard Law School
- Occupation: Lawyer
- Known for: Advisor of Franklin D. Roosevelt and Harry Truman

David K. Niles (November 23, 1888 – September 28, 1952; Boston, Massachusetts) was an American political advisor who worked in the White House from 1942 to 1951 for the administrations of Franklin Roosevelt and Harry Truman. Niles was one of only two Roosevelt aides retained by Truman upon his assumption of the presidency.

== Childhood ==
Born David Neyhus in Boston's North End and raised in Boston's South End, Niles was the eldest of seven children, six of whom survived to adulthood. His parents were Ashkenazi Jewish immigrants: Asher K. Neyhus from the Russian Empire, and Sophie Berlin (Berlińska) from Suwałki, Congress Poland. He and his father kept the middle initial "K" to honor their heritage as kohanim. His father worked as a tailor to support the family. While in attendance at Brimmer Grammar School, Niles became acquainted with author Edward Everett Hale, who became a mentor to Niles as he "supplied the boy with reading material and urged him in his ambition to acquire knowledge".

== Entry into politics ==
While in high school, he Anglicized his surname Neyhus to Niles, reportedly inspired by his classmate, figure skater Nathaniel Niles. He graduated from the prestigious Boston Latin School in 1906, but went to work at a department store to support his family. Through attending lectures at Boston's Ford Hall Forum, he caught the eye of its head, Republican George W. Coleman, who took the young Niles under his wing. During World War I, Coleman took Niles with him to Washington, D.C. to work in the US Department of Labor's Information Office.

Upon his return to Boston after the war, Coleman promoted Niles to the position of assistant director of the Ford Hall Forum, where he would later himself become director (1921–1952).

Through his position at the Ford Hall Forum, Niles was asked by Wisconsin Senator Robert La Follette and Montana Senator Burton Wheeler to aid their bid for presidency and vice presidency of the United States with the Progressive Party in 1924. He headed the speakers' bureau, and though the campaign failed abysmally, he was able to gain political insight from the experience.

In the aftermath of the La Follette presidential campaign, he attracted the attention of Harvard lawyer Felix Frankfurter, who was then defense counsel for the Sacco-Vanzetti trial, and the two began to work together, forming a lifelong friendship.

== Roosevelt Administration ==
Through his work on the presidential campaign of New York Governor Al Smith in 1928, Niles met Harry Hopkins, a vital political contact who would later become one of the chief architects of the New Deal and would bring Niles into the Roosevelt administration.

Niles would serve as the Director of the American Business Census in Massachusetts (1933–1934), a consultant, director, and assistant administrator of the Works Progress Administration (1936–1939), Special Assistant to the Secretary of Commerce (1939–1940), as well as a consultant and advisor to the Office of Production Management and War Production Board before becoming a presidential advisor to Franklin Roosevelt.

== Communist allegations ==
In 1943, Congressman Fred Bradley accused Niles of having Communist connections while involved with the Ford Hall Forum. Allegedly based on information regarding Niles' past that had been provided by his childhood classmate at Boston Latin School, Joseph Kennedy, these accusations are thought to have been largely motivated by antisemitism.

More recent allegations of Communist connections to Niles have arisen: A Venona decrypted message from New York to Moscow reported on a plan to send a husband and wife team of NKVD 'illegals' to Mexico.

The message reads:

Through CAPITAN'S (Roosevelt's) advisor David Niles –will take 3-4 days, will cost 500 dollars.... [A]round Niles there is a group of his friends who will arrange anything for a bribe. Through them TENOR (Michael W. Burd) obtains priorities and has already paid them as much as 6000 dollars. Whether NILES takes a bribe himself is not known for certain.

Burd was a Soviet agent and an officer of the Midland Export Corporation in New York City.

== Truman Administration ==
Following Roosevelt's death, Niles remained in the presidential cabinet as an advisor to President Harry Truman.

Niles was instrumental in convincing the President to admit 100,000 refugees into the United States from the displaced persons camps in post–World War II Europe.

In 1947, President Truman awarded him the Medal for Merit. At the time, Niles was the longest serving aide in White House history.

Entrusted with minority affairs, Niles was one of the key forces behind the desegregation of the United States Armed Forces.

== Niles and Israel ==
Niles was a committed Zionist and was important in providing access to the White House for American Zionists.

Niles' efforts on behalf of Jewish statehood earned him the support and praise of such figures as Chaim Weizmann and Moshe Sharett. Upon the establishment of the State of Israel and the opening of an Israeli embassy in Washington, Niles became close with Ambassador Eliahu Eilat as well as his successor Abba Eban.

Niles was active in American Jewish communal politics. Along with his involvement in the United Jewish Appeal, he also maintained friendships with influential Jewish leaders such as Rabbi Stephen S. Wise and Abram L. Sachar, along with Jewish supreme court justices Louis D. Brandeis and Felix Frankfurter.

== Death ==
Niles never married, and died in Beth Israel Hospital in Boston on 28 September 1952, two months shy of his 64th birthday.
