= Sonol =

Israeli fuel and gas station chain

Sonol Israel Ltd.
- Type: Private
- Predecessor: Socony Mobil Israel
- Founded: 1913
- Headquarters: Netanya, Israel
- Key people: Nir Galili (CEO)
- Products: Refined fuel
- Parent: Granite Hacarmel Investments Ltd.
- Website: www.sonol.co.il/e/

Sonol Israel or Sonol (Hebrew: סונול), is an Israeli fuel provider and the country's third largest gas station chain. The company traces its roots back to 1917 and World War I. Sonol has been indirectly controlled by the Azrieli Group since 2006.

== History ==
=== 1913–1947 ===
The Standard Oil Company of New York (Socony) began oil exploration operations in Ottoman Palestine in 1913. It had been granted concessions by the Ottoman government to conduct geological surveys in order to ascertain whether oil was in existence in commercial quantities. Preparations to drill at a concession in the Negev – southern present-day Israel – were halted in 1915 due to World War I. After the war, when the territory of Palestine came under British administration, Socony complained to the U.S. State Department that the British government was refusing to allow the company to carry out research at its concessions. The State Department interceded with the British on Socony's behalf, and in December 1922 Socony completed its surveys. The surveys indicated that oil was not available in commercial quantities, after which Socony abandoned its concessionary claims and joined the Iraq Petroleum Company (IPC) in 1928.

Vacuum Oil Company began operating mechanical gas pumps in 1924. In 1931, Socony and Vacuum merged to form Socony-Vacuum Oil Company. By the 1940s, various transnational oil companies were operating in Mandatory Palestine, including IPC, Shell and Socony-Vacuum. IPC owned terminal facilities of the Kirkuk–Haifa pipeline; Shell jointly controlled the Haifa oil refinery with British Petroleum; and Socony-Vacuum maintained a local distributing agency accounting for 25–30% of the local oil market.

=== 1948–1999 ===
In the late 1940s, around the time Israel gained its independence, Socony-Vacuum made its pumps electric motor-driven. Saudi pressure in 1956 compelled Socony-Vacuum – which theretofore had been one of Israel's principal oil suppliers and which a year earlier had changed its name to Socony Mobil – to terminate its relationship with Israel and sell its interests there. In 1957 Socony Mobil's Israel operations were acquired by Rudolf Sonneborn and Sonol became the name of the company.

Sonol acquired gas distribution company Supergas in 1975. In 1981 Sonol was acquired by Granite Hacarmel Investments Ltd., one of the largest holding companies in Israel. In 1990 Sonol acquired car battery manufacturer Vulcan from Koor Industries Ltd for $2 million.

=== Since 2000 ===
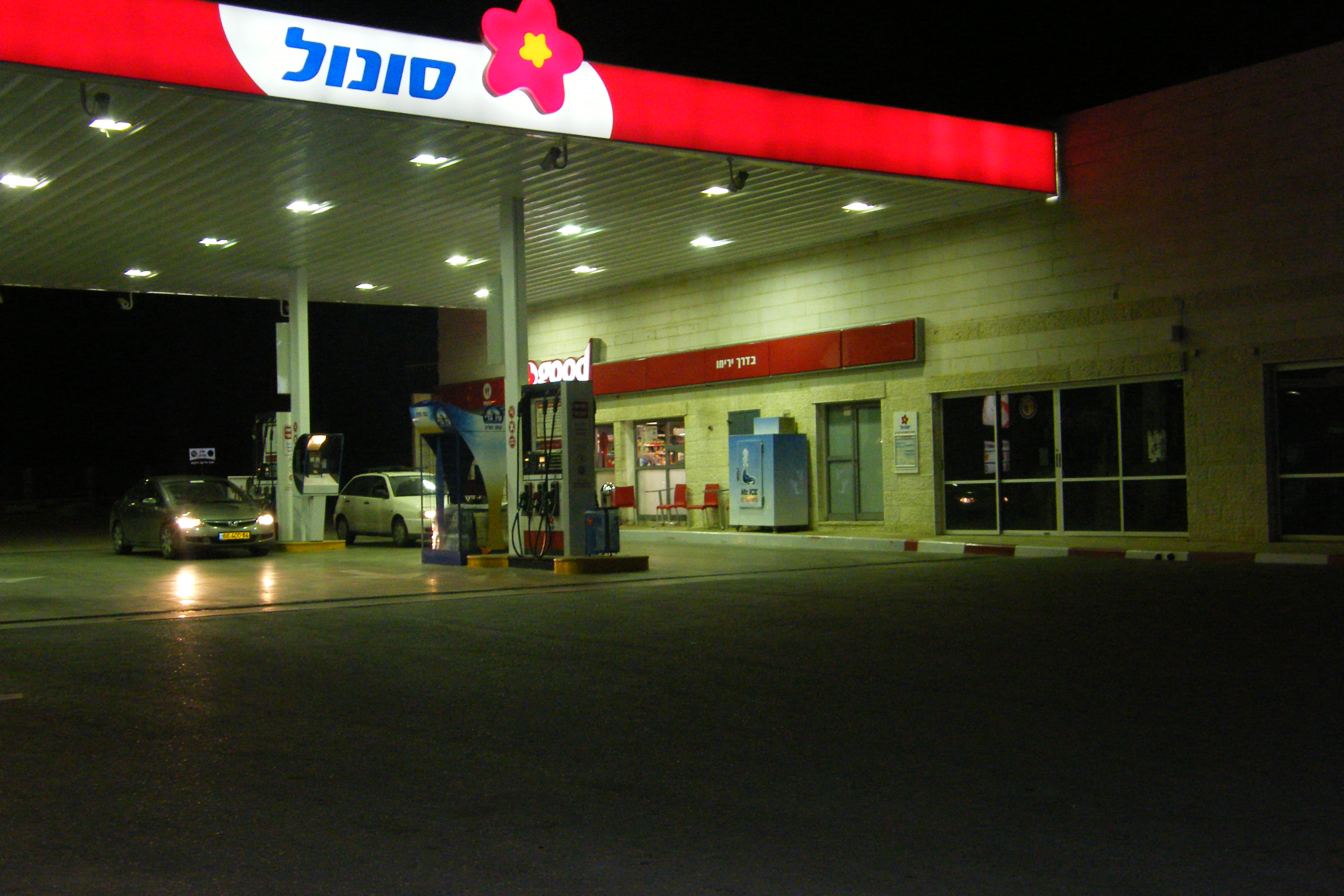
Sonol gas station near Kfar Adumim

Vulcan was sold in 2000 to Focus Capital Group Ltd. Sonol announced the establishment of its own chain of gas station convenience stores in 2004, following a similar trend set by rivals Paz, Delek and Dor Alon. By 2010 it was operating 140 such stores under the brand So Good.

In September 2005 Granite Hacarmel agreed to sell Sonol's 210 gas stations and other Granite-held assets to Dor Alon for $155 million. The Antitrust Authority opposed the deal and in April 2006 filed an appeal with the Supreme Court. In June 2006 the Supreme Court ruled to suspend the Sonol deal. In October 2010 Azrieli Group acquired 54% of Granite for $148 million and in December increased its stake to 63.8% for an additional NIS109.2 million.

In 2011 Sonol was one of four companies that together controlled 90% of the Israeli fuel market. In March Sonol and Better Place signed an agreement to deploy electric car battery recharging terminals at Sonol's gas stations. In October Sonol stations began offering gas containing an additive produced by Lubrizol Corporation shown in one study to reduce fumes and carbon dioxide emissions.

== Notable tender wins ==
In February 2004 Sonol, together with a foreign partner, won a tender to supply refined fuel to U.S. forces in Iraq for $70–80 million. In August 2004 Sonol won a tender to supply crude oil, diesel and gasoline to Dead Sea Works for five years for $300 million.

Israel's jet fuel market was opened up to competition in mid-1996. In January 2008 Sonol outbid three competitors to secure a tender to supply jet fuel to seven Star Alliance airlines for NIS300–400 million. The two-year contract was renewed in December 2009 for $60 million.

In January 2012 Sonol won one of the largest-ever fuel tenders in Israel to supply diesel to Israel Railways in the central and southern regions of the country for three years.

== Philanthropy ==
Sonol launched a nationwide campaign with the JDRF in 2005 to raise donations to help young sufferers of diabetes and further medical research. In 2007 Sonol launched a nationwide campaign to raise money for the nonprofit organization Larger Than Life, which strives to improve the lives of children and teenagers with cancer.

== Criticism ==
=== Involvement in Israeli settlements ===
On 12 February 2020, the United Nations published a database of companies doing business related in the West Bank, including East Jerusalem, as well as in the occupied Golan Heights. Sonol was listed on the database on account of its activities in Israeli settlements in these occupied territories, which are considered illegal under international law.

== See also ==
- Brewster Jennings
- Isaac Wolfson
- ExxonMobil
- List of automotive fuel brands
- List of companies of Israel
- Sonol gas station bombing
