= American Crusade Against Lynching =

20th century American Anti-Lynching organization

The American Crusade Against Lynching (ACAL) was an organization created in 1946 and headed by Paul Robeson, dedicated to eliminating lynching in the United States. A strong advocate of the Civil Rights Movement, Robeson believed "a fraternity must be established in which success and achievement are recognized and those deserving receive the respect, honor and dignity due them." In his speech "The New Idealism", delivered as a Rutgers College valedictory address, Robeson supported the idea that all – both colored and white people – need to take part in the creation of the new "American Idealism"; which led to the development of the American Crusade Against Lynching.

== History ==
The ACAL was first introduced at a "monster rally" in Madison Square Garden on September 12. The organization however was officially launched at the nation's capital on September 23 (the anniversary of the Emancipation Proclamation).

The ACAL was initially denied support and was refused sponsorship by the National Association for the Advancement of Colored People (NAACP). The NAACP viewed the ACAL as a campaign that was a "competition" to its nonviolent movement. The ACAL however, was recognized and supported by W.E.B. Du Bois, one of the founders of the NAACP. Du Bois, along with liberal attorney Bartley Crum, joined Robeson in his "crusade call" and endorsed the ACAL campaign. In support of the ACAL, Du Bois stated to the NAACP that "the fight against mob law is the monopoly of no one person, no one organization." Along with Du Bois, Ida B. Wells used journalistic approaches to condemn lynchings.

One of the most prominent leaders of the Anti-Lynching Crusade, Mary Burnett Talbert of Buffalo, New York, worked with an executive committee of 15 members and the support of over 700 state workers to provide awareness of lynchings in The United States. The main objective of this organization was to "unite a million women [both colored and white] to stop lynchings." Under Talbert's representation, the organization performed a "short, sharp" campaign. This campaign received attention as it provided a list of casualties totaling 83 American women who had been lynched by mobs – in addition to 3,353 men – within a 30-year period. Under Talbert's representation, the organization wrote a letter which led to a unanimous endorsement by the executive committee of the National Council of Women.

On September 23, 1946, Robeson and a delegation representing the ACAL met with President Harry Truman to push for an anti-lynching agenda. Robeson demanded that Truman issue a public statement expressing his views on lynching and recommending a set of legislative and educational measures aimed at eradicating mob violence. Truman turned down these requests, claiming that timing and political circumstances made these measures difficult to implement at the moment. Robeson was disappointed by this and found it troubling that the US government was at the time willing to actively engage in the Nuremberg Trials while it turned its head from racial injustices at home. Delegations also met with US Attorney General Tom Clark as well as the Democratic and Republican national committees. The delegation's program included the creation of a federal anti-lynching bill, arrest and punishment for all lynchers, and preventing Ku Klux Klan members from joining Congress.

Many prominent intellectuals were members, including Albert Einstein. Other notable supporters of the organization were Max Yergan, Joseph Curran, Canada Lee, Jack Kroll, Lena Horne, and Oscar Hammerstein II. The Federal Bureau of Investigation (FBI) had been long concerned about socialist and communist movements for their instigation of social and labor unrest. Having noted communist support for African-American civil rights before World War II, the FBI characterized the "Crusade" as a "communist front." Robeson and the ACAP were thus both put under investigation by the FBI. The FBI classified members such as Einstein as communist sympathizers; and developed intelligence files on them.
