= Dorothy Schiff =

American newspaper publisher (1903–1989)

Dorothy "Dolly" Schiff
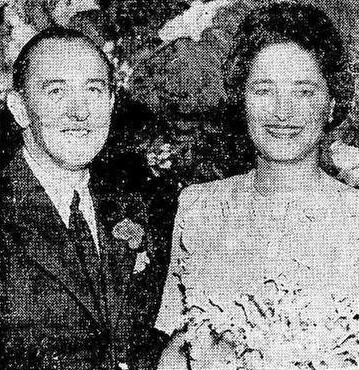
- Schiff with her third husband Ted Thackrey, 1943
- Born: March 11, 1903; New York City, US
- Died: August 30, 1989 (aged 86); New York City, US
- Occupation: Businesswoman
- Known for: Owner and publisher of the New York Post
- Spouse(s): Richard Brown West Hall (m. 1923; div. 1928) George Backer Jr. (m. 1932; div. 1943) Ted Thackrey (m. 1943; div. 1949) Rudolf Sonneborn (m. 1953, divorced)
- Children: 3
- Family: Ruth Roman (daughter-in-law); Diana Lynn (daughter-in-law); A. Fredric Leopold (son-in-law); Robert W. Sweet (son-in-law); Werner H. Kramarsky (son-in-law); Dolly Hall (granddaughter)

Dorothy Schiff (March 11, 1903 – August 30, 1989) was an American businesswoman who was the owner and then publisher of the New York Post for nearly 40 years. She was a granddaughter of financier Jacob Schiff. Schiff was interested in social services and reform, and was involved in several welfare groups.

== Early life ==
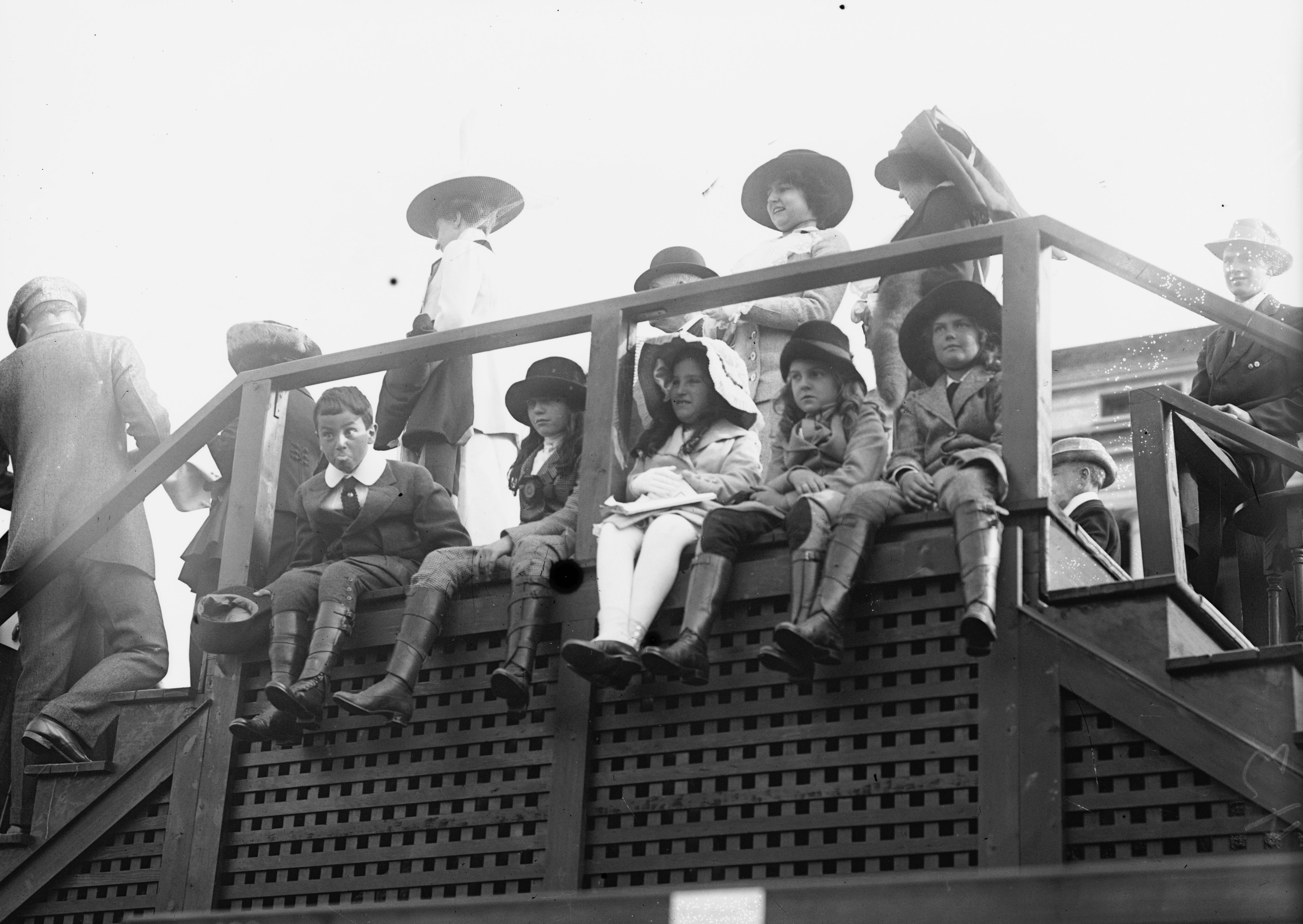
Schiff (seated, center) c. 1910–1915

Schiff was born in New York City into a prominent German Jewish banking family, the daughter of Mortimer Schiff and Adele (Neustadt) Schiff, and the granddaughter of financier Jacob Schiff. She attended secondary school at Manhattan's Brearley School and attended Bryn Mawr College in Bryn Mawr, Pennsylvania. Afterward, she began living as a wealthy debutante.

== Marriages, The New York Post ==
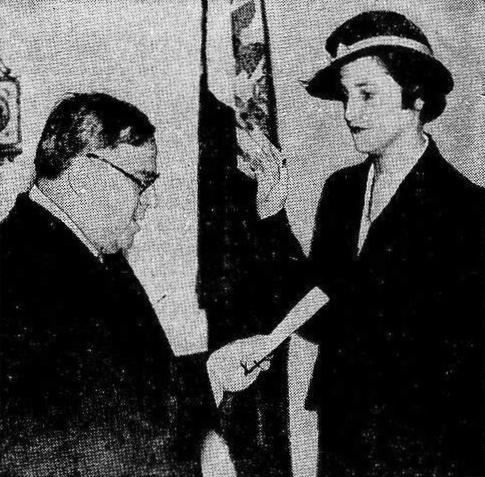
Schiff is sworn in as a member of the New York City Board of Child Welfare by mayor Fiorello La Guardia, 1937

Schiff's first marriage came in 1923, in spite of strong resistance by her parents, to Richard Brown West Hall, a broker. They divorced in 1928. By October 21, 1932, when she married George Backer, a city councillor and a staunch liberal Democrat, Schiff's political stance changed and she became a strong supporter of the Democratic party and the New Deal. She was interested in social services and reform, and was involved in several welfare groups, chief among them the Henry Street Settlement. In 1937, she was appointed by New York City mayor Fiorello La Guardia to a nine-year term on the Board of Child Welfare. She lived in New York City and had a country house in Bernardsville, New Jersey.

In 1939, Schiff bought control of the New York Post, at the urging of Backer, installing him as publisher and president. When he resigned in 1942, she took up the mantle and became New York's first female newspaper publisher.

After divorcing Backer in 1943, she married Ted Thackrey, whom she had earlier installed as editor; it was Thackrey's idea to change the Post's format from a broadsheet to a tabloid. Under her tenure the Post was devoted to liberalism, supporting trade unions and social welfare. During the 1940s, The Post featured the most popular columnists of the time, such as Drew Pearson, Eleanor Roosevelt, and Eric Sevareid. She also wrote her own column called "Dear Reader". In 1945, Schiff launched the Paris Post, the second ever American newspaper to be published in Paris. It lasted until 1948.

Thackrey left the Post after a disagreement over whom to support for the presidency in 1948; Thackrey favored Henry A. Wallace whereas Schiff favored Thomas Dewey. This caused Thackrey to resign in 1949, and they divorced that year.

Schiff's fourth and final husband was Rudolph G. Sonneborn, whom she married on August 18, 1953, and later divorced.

In 1958, Schiff caused controversy by withdrawing her support at the last minute of Governor Averell Harriman. Though she did not endorse Harriman's opponent, Nelson Rockefeller, the sudden withdrawal of endorsement of Harriman, which came in the final edition of the Post on the day before the election, was believed to have swung the vote in Rockefeller's favor and helped launch his political career.

Jeffrey Potter's Men, Money and Magic: The Story of Dorothy Schiff, a biography of Schiff, was published in 1976. It generated significant publicity after The New York Times reported on its front page that Schiff, in the book, claimed to have had an affair with Franklin D. Roosevelt. Schiff denied it, saying only that she had had a "relationship" with Roosevelt.

Schiff sold the Post to Rupert Murdoch, for a reported $31 million ($175 million in 2025), in 1976. It is believed that she was pessimistic about the future of afternoon papers in the city; also, a change in federal inheritance laws would have affected the value of her estate unless she sold the paper when she did. She remained as an official consultant until 1981, although she played no actual role at the paper. She died at her home in New York City on August 30, 1989. A more complete biography, The Lady Upstairs: Dorothy Schiff and the New York Post by Marilyn Nissenson, was published in 2007.

== Family ==
Her daughter, Adele Hall Sweet, was married to Beverly Hills mayor A. Fredric Leopold and federal judge Robert W. Sweet. Her son, Mortimer W. Hall, was married to actress Ruth Roman, actress Diana Lynn, and author Penelope Coker Wilson. Her daughter, Sarah-Ann Backer, was married to public official and art collector Werner H. Kramarsky. Her granddaughter is film producer Dolly Hall.
