= Joseph Fels Barnes =

American journalist (1907–1970)

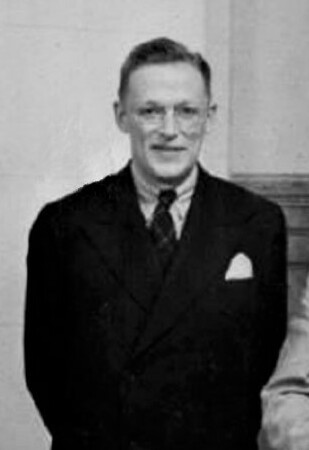
Barnes in 1942

Joseph Fels Barnes (1907–1970) was an American journalist who was executive director of the Institute of Pacific Relations (IPR).

== Background ==
Barnes was born in 1907, and graduated from Harvard University in 1927, where he was managing editor and president of the Harvard Crimson. He studied at the London School of Slavonic Studies.

== Career ==
=== Institute of Pacific Relations ===
Barnes worked on staff in the Soviet Union and China at the Institute of Pacific Relations (IPR) from 1932 to 1934. He was a journalist for the New York Herald Tribune based in Moscow, Berlin, and New York from 1934 to 1948. That was interrupted by service as director of the Office of War Information overseas branch and Voice of America radio show (1941–1944).

=== PM / New York Star ===
Barnes was an editor of PM, which he bought from Marshall Field III with Bartley Crum and renamed New York Star. Barnes remained editor until the Star folded in 1949.

=== Simon & Schuster ===
Barnes then worked as an editor at Simon & Schuster, where his friendship with William L. Shirer led in 1956 to a book contract for Shirer's best-selling history of Nazi Germany, The Rise and Fall of the Third Reich; during the years Shirer worked on the book in the late 1950s, Barnes "offer[ed] helpful criticism at every turn."

Barnes was also for a time a faculty member at Sarah Lawrence College.

== Allegations of Communism ==
Often affiliated with left-wing causes, Barnes was accused in the 1950s of being a member of the Communist Party USA by several witnesses. For example, Whittaker Chambers reported on in August 1951:

Whittaker Chambers, confessed former Communist courier, said that a Red leader in 1937 told him that Joseph Barnes, a member of the faculty of Sarah Lawrence College, was a member of a Communist underground cell in New York. Mr. Chambers identified his informant as J. Peters... Mr. Barnes, former foreign editor of the New York Herald Tribune and former secretary of the American Institute of Pacific Relations who is now an editor of Simon & Schuster, New York publishers, denied the accusation – as he has on three previous occasions [...].

Chambers stated that Barnes had attended meetings regularly at a Communist group headed by Frederick Vanderbilt Field and held at the Central Park West home of Field's mother; Barnes dismissed the allegations by explaining that he had married Field's former wife.

== Personal life and death ==
Around 1935, Barnes married Elizabeth G. Brown of Duluth, Minnesota, former first wife of Frederick Vanderbilt Field.

Barnes died in 1970 of cancer in New York City.

== Awards ==
- 1965 PEN Translation Prize for The Story of a Life

== Legacy ==
Barnes' papers at the Library of Congress contain an unpublished biography of Wendell L. Willkie plus correspondence with Irita Taylor Van Doren, George Bergal, Norman Corwin, Bartley Cavanaugh Crum, William Fitz Gibbon, and J.L. Jones.

== Works ==
- Behind the Far Eastern Conflict with Frederick V. Field (1933)
- Empire in the East (1934) (1970)
- Days and Nights by Konstantin Simonov (1945)
- Willkie: The Events He was Part of, the Ideas He Fought for (1952)
- The Story of a Life by Konstantin Paustovsky (1964)
- Fierce and Beautiful World: Stories by Andrei Platonov (1970)

== See also ==
- Bartley Crum
- Frederick Vanderbilt Field

== Sources ==
- Shirer, William Lawrence (1960), The Rise and Fall of the Third Reich: A History of Nazi Germany, New York City: Simon & Schuster, ASIN B0766DKDLR, LCCN 60006729, OCLC 1286630, OL 5794925M, Wikidata Q138029595
