= Ford Hall Forum =

Oldest free public lecture series in the United States

The Ford Hall Forum is the oldest free public lecture series in the United States. Founded in 1908, it continues to host open lectures and discussions in the Greater Boston area. Some of the more well-known past speakers include Maya Angelou, Isaac Asimov, Noam Chomsky, Alan Dershowitz, W. E. B. Du Bois, Al Gore, Martin Luther King Jr., Henry Kissinger, Norman Mailer, Ayn Rand, Cokie Roberts, Eleanor Roosevelt, Robert Frost, Margaret Mead, Malcolm X, Jimmy Wales, Rosalynn Carter and Gwen Ifill.

The Ford Hall Forum's mission is "to promote freedom of speech and foster an informed and engaged citizenry through the free public presentation of lectures, debates, and discussions." Its events strive to illuminate key issues facing society by bringing to a public podium knowledgeable and thought-provoking speakers. These speakers are presented in person, for free, and in settings that facilitate frank and open debate. All programs provide equal time for speakers' remarks and questions from the audience.

== History ==
The Forum was founded in February 1908 by George W. Coleman, a Boston businessman and then leader of the Boston Baptist Social Union. The first public lectures were held in the Union's meeting place, the Ford Building on Ashburton Place, Beacon Hill, from which the Forum's name originates. The building was named after Daniel Sharp Ford, formerly editor of the Youth's Companion magazine, as well as publisher of a Baptist magazine, the Christian Watchman. Mr. Ford was a noted philanthropist who died in December 1899. When he died, his will bequeathed the building to the Baptist Social Union, so that it could hold free public meetings, concerts, and open discussions on current events. The first speaker was the Baptist Pastor Walter Rauschenbusch whose book "Christianity and the Social Crisis" had been released the year before.

In 1924, Boston and Springfield-based station WBZ agreed to broadcast some of the Ford Hall Forum's Sunday night meetings, giving the speakers and their perspectives a much wider audience than just the people in the room (or the people who read about the speakers when the newspapers reported summaries of what they said). Among the Ford Hall Forum speakers heard on WBZ in 1924 was Rabbi Stephen Samuel Wise, who denounced the Ku Klux Klan. A 1925 talk by Father Michael J. Ahern, who was both a theologian and a scientist (with an advanced degree in geology), discussed the Catholic view on evolution; he also took questions from the audience. And a talk by W.E.B. Du Bois in January 1926 addressed "the hypocrisy of white folk." Not all of the talks were about current events or controversial issues; the listeners also heard presentations from famous humorists, authors, historians, poets, and medical professionals. For example, in late November 1926, Professor Joseph Jastrow, a psychologist from the University of Wisconsin, analyzed some commonly held superstitions. But while the programs seemed to be popular with the audience, by early 1927 WBZ had stopped broadcasting them, and replaced them with programs that had a sponsor. The Ford Hall Forum continued to provide interesting talks, but the radio audience could no longer hear them. It would not be till the mid 1950s when radio stations began regularly broadcasting Ford Hall Forum events. WCOP did so in 1956 when the station broadcast several talks, including one by anthropologist Margaret Mead. Subsequently, Harvard's WHRB-FM taped and then broadcast several talks during 1957, including one by 1950 Nobel Peace Prize winner Ralph J. Bunche. The taped presentations continued to be heard on WHRB-FM until December 1961. By the end of 1961, the programs were being heard on WGBH-FM.

As a free speech institution that does not endorse the view of any of its speakers, the Forum has occasionally given a stage to speakers whom other institutions would not (or could not). In 1929, Margaret Sanger appeared at the Forum, visibly gagged, after Mayor James Michael Curley issued an injunction barring her from speaking about family planning. The Forum frequently withstood criticism for hosting meetings that featured activists whose views were considered controversial; the Forum was accused of being a haven for radicals, socialists, and Communists by people who disagreed with some of these speakers. In 1930, W.E.B. Du Bois participated in a debate about whether Black people should be encouraged to seek social equality, a contentious topic in an era when American was still segregated. The Forum endured a large and angry protest in 1933, when a pro-Nazi speaker, Prof. Friedrich Schoenemann, gave a talk; police had to be called to calm the protesters, and several were arrested. Another controversial speaker, Malcolm X, was invited to speak in the 1960s, at a time when he was widely considered too dangerous to be given a public podium in the heart of Boston. In the early 1990s, when former Ku Klux Klan leader David Duke was a candidate for a seat in the U.S. Senate, the Forum brought him to Boston to answer questions about his views and about his past.

Ousted by the Boston Baptist Social Union for fear of being associated with radicalism, the Ford Hall Forum began its own separate enterprise in 1929. The stated purpose of the new corporation was: "To provide education such as will develop intelligent, capable, and responsible citizens, minister to the welfare of all, and promote understanding of civic, moral, religious, and spiritual responsibilities. This can be done in part by maintaining a common meeting ground for all the people where there will be full, free, and open public discussion of all vital questions affecting human welfare."

Periodically, the Forum specifically recognizes the value of expressing sentiment that may not always be welcomed but is certainly necessary with its First Amendment Award in honor of Louis P. and Evelyn Smith, long time active benefactors of the Forum. Recipients are listed below along with other speakers.

Since its inception in 1908, the Ford Hall Forum was based at the Ford Building on Ashburton Place, but in late 1941, it moved to a new location: the John Hancock Hall on St. James Avenue. It moved again in October 1946, to Jordan Hall, on Gainsboro Street. Sometime in 1974, Ford Hall Forum relocated to Alumni Auditorium at Northeastern University. The Ford Hall Forum currently is presenting its lecture series in cooperation with Suffolk University.
