= Ralph M. Ingersoll Jr. =

American newspaper publisher

Ralph M. Ingersoll was an American newspaper publisher.

In the 1950s, his father, Ralph Ingersoll, acquired and managed several newspapers. His company, Ingersoll Publications, founded in 1957, was taken over by his son Ralph M. Ingersoll Jr. in 1982 after he had bought his father out in a deal that left them no longer on speaking terms.

The Ingersoll chain included about 40 daily papers, the largest of which was The New Haven Register, acquired in 1986. It also owned The Trentonian, in New Jersey's capital, and more than 100 weekly papers, including St. Louis Suburban Newspapers, a group of 41 weeklies.
