= PM (newspaper) =

New York City newspaper (1940–1948)

- Type: Daily newspaper
- Founder: Ralph Ingersoll
- Founded: June 1940
- Ceased publication: June 1948
- Political alignment: Liberal
- Headquarters: New York City
- Circulation: 165,000

PM was a liberal-leaning daily newspaper published in New York City by Ralph Ingersoll from June 1940 to June 1948 and financed by Chicago millionaire Marshall Field III.

The paper borrowed many elements from weekly news magazines, such as many large photos and at first was bound with staples. In an attempt to be free of pressure from business interests, it did not accept advertising. These departures from the norms of newspaper publishing created excitement in the industry. Some 11,000 people applied for the 150 jobs available when the publication first hired staff.

== Publication history ==
In 1945, Coulton Waugh employed a novel art approach on his PM strip Hank. According to Waugh, Hank was "a deliberate attempt to work in the field of social usefulness."

The origin of the name is unknown, although Ingersoll recalled that it probably referred to the fact that the paper appeared post meridiem (in the afternoon); The New Yorker reported that the name had been suggested by Lillian Hellman. (There is no historical evidence for the suggestion that the name was an abbreviation of Picture Magazine.)

The first year of the paper was a general success, though it was already in some financial trouble: its circulation of 100,000–200,000 was insufficient. Circulation averaged 165,000, but the paper never managed to sell the 225,000 copies a day it needed to break even. Marshall Field III had become the paper's funder; quite unusually, he was a "silent partner" in this continually money-losing undertaking. By June 1946, Field had invested $4,318,000 in the newspaper.

According to a June 21, 1966, memo from Ingersoll:

Before the end of the War it was actually operating in the black.... In my opinion at the time and these 20 years later−PM's death is most soundly attributable to a sustained and well-organized plot originating amongst Field's friends and associates in the business world who were alienated by Field's loyalty to PM and to me. The hostility was there from the beginning; the plot came together under the auspices of a man named Harry Cushing who was a retainer of Field's. The principal and successful offensive of this group was that it had as its objective Field's distraction from PM by persuading him to start the Sun in Chicago. Once they committed Field to the Sun venture, the end was inevitable. I can diagram it for you but merely put it on record here.

PM was sold in 1948 and published its final issue on June 22, changing its name the next day to the New York Star. The Star folded on January 28, 1949.

Early in 1950, Newsweek magazine summarized PM’s history: "Ralph Ingersoll, an engineer turned magazine man, started PM with overwhelming balyhoo (to which it never lived up) and a zealous staff in June, 1940. For five and a half years it bobbled in and out of the fiscal red and the political pink. An original stockholder who had sunk millions down the PM drain, Marshall Field III eventually became its sole owner. Ingersoll angrily stepped out when Field began taking advertising. But even that did not make PM pay. Advertisers shunned Field’s Chicago Sun-Times because of PM, and so he decided to drop the New York paper. He kept some stock, sold control to Crum, the attorney, and Joseph Barnes, former New York Herald Tribune foreign editor, for $300,000, then lent them $500,000. In May, 1948 Publisher Crum and Editor Barnes took over. They hopefully rechristened the paper the Star and began molding it, from PMs bewildering maze of fact and fancy, into a newspaper to fit the common conception of a newspaper. They boosted circulation from 110,000 to 140,000 and increased ad volume (at a lower rate), but their problems were too great. By far the greatest barrier was the paper’s barren cash register. Costs had soared. Even with more ads and readers the Star, the only New York paper to back President Truman’s 1948 candidacy, could not live down the $15,000-a-week loss it inherited from PM. Field pumped in still more money, while Crum and Barnes hunted new “angels.” Somehow, nothing worked. Finally, on the desk top, Crum told the paper’s 408 employees that the next day’s Star, after seven struggling months and 168 issues, would be the last."

== Politics ==
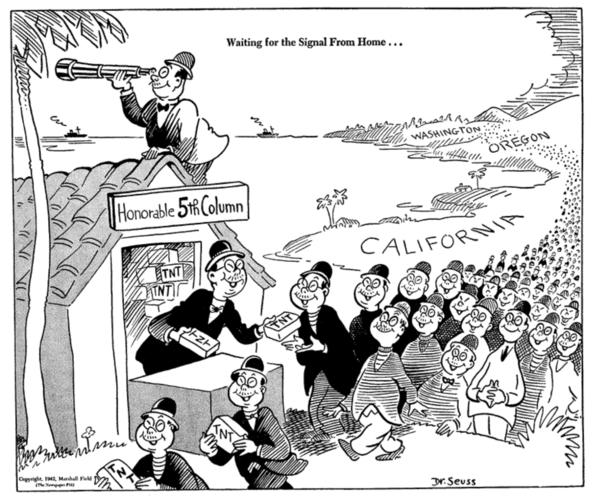
1942 World War II political cartoon by Dr. Seuss

Chronicles has accused the paper of being Communist-dominated, but Anya Schiffrin has said that the paper frequently opposed the policies of the Communist Party (CP) and engaged in editorial battles with the CP's paper, the Daily Worker.

In 1946, PM published some of the findings of federal investigator O. John Rogge into the inter-relationship during the 1930s and war years of authoritarian beliefs, armed militia groups, antisemitism and collusion between elected U.S. politicians and the German Nazi propaganda mill. Rogge had little success publishing his information elsewhere for many years.

== Staff ==
=== Editors ===
Leo Huberman was labor editor.

=== Writers ===
I. F. Stone was the paper's Washington correspondent. He published an award-winning series on European Jewish refugees attempting to run the British blockade to reach Palestine (later collected and published as Underground to Palestine). Staffers included theater critic Louis Kronenberger and film critic Cecelia Ager. Kenneth G. Crawford wrote for PM from 1939 to 1942.

The sports writers were Tom Meany, Tom O’Reilly and George F. T. Ryall, who covered horse racing. Sophie Smoliar was the New York City reporter working frequently with photographer Arthur Felig ("Weegee") (submitted by her son and a collection of her original articles). Elizabeth Hawes wrote about fashion, and her sister Charlotte Adams covered food.

=== Contributors ===
Theodor Geisel, better known as Dr. Seuss, published more than 400 cartoons on PM's editorial page. Crockett Johnson's comic strip Barnaby debuted in the paper in 1942. Other artists who worked at PM included Ad Reinhardt, one of the founders of Abstract Expressionism, and Joseph Leboit; both contributed margin cartoons and drawings. Noted artist Jack Coggins contributed wartime artwork for at least nine issues between 1940 and 1942.

Coulton Waugh created his short-lived strip, Hank, which began April 30, 1945, in PM. The story of a disabled G.I. returning to civilian life, Hank had a unique look due to Waugh's decorative art style, combined with dialogue lettered in upper and lower case rather than the accepted convention of all uppercase lettering in balloons and captions. Some dialogue was displayed with white lettering reversed into black balloons. Hank sought to raise questions about the reasons for war, and how it might be prevented by the next generation. Waugh discontinued it at the very end of 1945 because of eyestrain. Cartoonist Jack Sparling created the short-lived comic strip Claire Voyant, which ran from 1943 to 1948 in PM, and which was subsequently syndicated by the Chicago Sun-Times. Cartoonist Howard Sparber (né Howard Paul Sparber; 1921–2018) contributed after World War II. The Argentine Cartoonist Dante Quinterno publishes: Patoruzú his successful strip in South America.

Other writers who contributed articles included Erskine Caldwell, Myril Axlerod, McGeorge Bundy, Saul K. Padover, James Wechsler, eventually the paper's editorial writer, Penn Kimball, later a professor at the Columbia University Graduate School of Journalism, Myril Axelrod Bennett, Heywood Hale Broun, James Thurber, Dorothy Parker, Ernest Hemingway, Eugene Lyons, Earl Conrad, Benjamin Stolberg, Louis Adamic, Malcolm Cowley, Tip O'Neill (later Speaker of the House; and Ben Hecht.

Lee Rogow regularly contributed a short short story on Saturday from February 1 through June 6, 1948.

=== Photographers ===
Weegee, Margaret Bourke-White, Ray Platnick and Arthur Leipzig were the primary photographers.

- Julius "Skippy" Adelman (1924–2004)
- John Albert 1910–1972)
- Bernie Aumuller (né Bernard A. Aumuller; 1920–1971), his father, Bernard George Aumuller (1895–1975) was also a photographer
- Gene Badger
- Margaret Bourke-White (1904–1971)
- Hugh Broderick (né Hugh J. Broderick; 1910–1971)
- William "Bill" Brunk (Los Angeles Examiner)
- John S. DeBiase (1901–1954)
- John Derry
- Stephen Derry
- David Eisendrath, Jr. (né David Benjamin Eisendrath; 1914–1988)
- Morris Engel (1918–2005)
- Alan Fisher
- Morris Gordon (1918–2005)
- Irving Haberman (né Isaac Haberman; 1916–2003)
- Martin Harris (1908–1971)
- Dan Israel
- Charles Fenno Jacobs (1904–1974)
- Dan Keleher, (né Daniel J. Keleher, Jr., 1908–1952)
- Peter Killian
- Arthur Leipzig (né Isidore Leipzig; 1918–2014)
- Helen Levitt (1913–2009)
- Leo Lieb (né Morris Leo Lieb; 1909–2001)
- Ray Platnick (né Raphael Platnick; 1917–1986)
- Weegee, (pseudonym of Arthur (Usher) Fellig (1899–1968)
- Mary "Morrie" Morris (né Mary Louise Morris; 1914–2009), one of the first female AP photographers and pioneer of white umbrellas used give a softer look to flash lighting and portraiture. She, in June 1937, married filmmaker Ralph Steiner. In 1963, she married classical record producer for Mercury, Harold Lawrence (né Harold Levine; 1923–2011), who, at the time, was the General Manager of the London Symphony Orchestra

=== Contributing photographers ===
- Robert Capa (1913–1954)
- Walker Evans (1903–1975)
- Edward Weston (1886–1958)
- Edward Steichen (1879–1973)
- Ralph Steiner (1899–1986)

=== Sunday magazine section ===
Picture News was the Sunday magazine section of PM.

Editor: William Thomas McCleery (1912–2000)
Managing editor: Herbert Yahraes (né Herbert Conrad Yahraes, Jr.; 1906–1985)
Associate editors: Lorimer Dexter Heywood (1899–1977), Kenneth Stewart, David Rodman Lindsay (1916–1985), Peggy Wright, Gertrude Stamm
Staff: Raymond Abrashkin (1911–1960), Skippy Adelman, Holly Beye (née Helen Beye; 1922–2011), W. Russell Bowie, Jr. (1920–2002) (son of Walter Russell Bowie), Mary Morris (maiden; 1914–2009), Charles Norman (1904–1996), Roger Samuel Pippett (1895–1962), Robert Rice (1916–1998), Selma Robinson (maiden; 1899–1977) (mother-in-law of Hymen B. Mintz), Dale Rooks (né Rhine Dale Rooks; 1917–1954) (photographer), Lillian E. Ross (née Lillian Rosovsky; 1918–2017)
Art director: H. Russell Countryman

== See also ==
- The Day Book

== General and cited references ==
- Jason E. Hill (2018). Artist as Reporter: Weegee, Ad Reinhardt, and the PM News Picture. Oakland, Calif.: University of California Press. ISBN 978-0-520-29143-0.
- Paul Milkman (1997). PM: A New Deal in Journalism 1940–1948. New Brunswick, NJ: Rutgers University Press. ISBN 0-8135-2434-2.
