= Recontra Frente Norte 380 =

Militant organization in Nicaragua

Recontra Frente Norte 380 was a right-wing militant organization which occupied the Chilean embassy in Managua, Nicaragua, on 5 June 1995.

The organization made no statements or demands, departed, and released their hostages unharmed following the incident.

== Sources ==
- 1995 Patterns of Global Terrorism U.S. Department of State, as reported by the Federation of American Scientists. April, 1996.
