= Garry M. Gaber =

American game designer, director, project leader, artist, writer and programmer

- Occupations: Video game designer, director, project leader, artist and programmer
- Employer: LucasArts
- Known for: His work on the Star Wars Galactic Battlegrounds franchise.

Garry M. Gaber is a game designer, director, project leader, artist, writer and programmer who worked on a number of notable LucasArts Video Games from 1994 through 2003. He is probably best known for his work as Project Leader and Designer on the Star Wars Galactic Battlegrounds franchise.

He received a Bachelor of Fine Arts from New York University and worked in the engineering field before being hired by LucasArts in 1994.

He currently is owner of Escape Hatch Entertainment, LLC, and has worked on two educational titles geared toward high school students, "Discover Babylon" and "Immune Attack".

== Game development history ==
- Star Wars: Rebel Assault II: The Hidden Empire (1995)
- Star Wars: Shadows of the Empire (1996)
- Mortimer and the Riddles of the Medallion (1996)
- Star Wars: Masters of Teräs Käsi (1997)
- Star Wars Jedi Knight: Dark Forces II (1997)
- Star Wars: Force Commander (2000)
- Star Wars Galactic Battlegrounds (2001)
- Star Wars Galactic Battlegrounds: Clone Campaigns (2002)
- Star Wars Galactic Battlegrounds Saga (2002)
