= Jeremy Stone =

American scientist

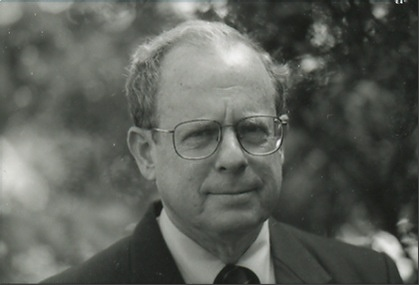
- Born: November 23, 1935
- Died: January 1, 2017 (aged 81)
- Education: Massachusetts Institute of Technology; Swarthmore College (BA); Stanford University (PhD)

Jeremy J. Stone (November 23, 1935 – January 1, 2017) was an American scientist who was president of the Federation of American Scientists from 1970 to 2000, where he led that organization's advocacy initiatives in arms control, human rights, and foreign policy. In 2000, he was succeeded as president by Henry Kelly. Stone continued his work at a new organization called Catalytic Diplomacy. Stone was the son of the journalist I. F. Stone.

== Early life and education ==
Born in 1935, Stone studied at the Bronx High School of Science (1951–53) during which time he taught Three-dimensional chess at the New School for Social Research. After attending MIT for one year, he graduated from Swarthmore College in June 1957. As a consultant to the RAND Corporation in the summer of 1958, he invented the Cross-Section Method of Linear Programming.

Stone received a Ph.D. in mathematics from Stanford University in 1960 and joined Stanford Research Institute (SRI) as a research mathematician where he worked on Error Correcting Codes. In 1962, he left SRI to work at Hudson Institute on issues of war and peace.

== Career ==
In 1963, he began working on an arms control proposal for preventing anti-ballistic missile (ABM) systems. In 1964–1966 he was a research associate at the Harvard Center for International Affairs (CFIA) where he wrote two books: Containing the Arms Race: Some Specific Proposals (MIT Press, 1966) and Strategic Persuasion: Arms Control Through Dialogue (Columbia University Press, 1967). He taught mathematics and arms control at Pomona College from 1966–1968.

In June 1970, Stone became the CEO of the Federation of American Scientists (FAS), founded in 1945 by atomic scientists as Federation of Atomic Scientists (FAS). In June 1973, as a consequence of his activism in criticizing Pentagon spending practices, his name appeared as one of the 150 listed on the "enemies" list of President Nixon.

During the 30 years of Stone's stewardship, he and the federation contributed to policy debates on the nuclear arms race, human rights, ethnic violence and civil conflict, small arms, controlling biological and chemical weapons, energy conservation, global warming, and related subjects.

Several of Stone's arms control initiatives bore fruit. According to the 2002 book Unarmed Forces by Matthew Evangelista, the Russians were calling the ABM Treaty "Jeremy Stone's proposal" as early as 1967. Stone designed and secured Carter Administration approval of a follow-on to SALT II ("Shrink SALT II") which was proposed in secret by President Carter at the 1979 Vienna Summit. He invented a finesse (the Bear Hug Strategy) that may have helped to make START II possible. And he created an entirely new approach ("No One Decision-Maker") to the issue of no-first-use of nuclear weapons.

In the 1970s, Stone and FAS helped catalyze the opening of scientific exchange with China in 1972. He persuaded the American scientific community to set up human rights committees to defend the rights of Russian scientists and was a leading American advocate for Soviet physicist Andrei Sakharov, who in 1976 described Stone as "creative, articulate and brave."

Stone was instrumental in stopping an illegal U.S. Government program of mail opening by the CIA. He is credited with having made major contributions to changing U.S. policy on Cambodia at a time when that policy had allied the United States to the genocidal Khmer Rouge. He also waged an effective campaign to have the CIA and the KGB work together on issues of common concern. And he once was assigned, by Carl Sagan, the difficult task of determining whether to warn the East Coast of the United States of a possible impending earthquake.

In April 1999, PublicAffairs published his memoir, "Every Man Should Try": Adventures of a Public Interest Activist, in which he documented his achievements and failures–including those noted above. (The book was published in Russian in March 2004 with an introduction by Academician Evgeny Velikhov.)

In December 1998, he led the first American scientific delegation in 20 years to Iran and, in September 1999, hosted the return visit of the Academy of Sciences of Iran. Introducing this delegation to a host of scientific organizations in Washington, including the National Academy of Sciences, led to an agreement to restart the (post-1979 revolution) Iranian-American scientific exchange.

Stone published his second memoir, Catalytic Diplomacy: Russia, China, North Korea, and Iran, in October 2009. It covers his work from 1999 to 2006.

== Resignation from FAS ==
After resigning from the presidency of the Federation of American Scientists on June 1, 2000, he formed the small nonprofit, Catalytic Diplomacy, which from 1999 to 2006 worked mainly on cross-straits relations between China and Taiwan; U.S.-Russian arms control; U.S. relations with Iran; and U.S. relations with North Korea. Beginning in 2007, along with a small group of activists, Stone worked on issues involving Myanmar (Burma), Cuba, Afghanistan, and Iran.

In 2004, he catalyzed the first public visit to Iran in a quarter century of a U.S. Government official, James Billington, the Librarian of Congress.

In 2010, Stone created an organization, Catalytic Longevity, to advance a dietary approach called "carbohydrate concentration".

In 2014, he reported on his work on religion on a website at www.catalyticreligion.org. This website documents the idea that the main architects of the three largest Western religions—Christianity (Apostle Paul), Islam (Mohammad), and Protestantism (Martin Luther)--all suffered from a mental disorder that encourages the creation of new religion. The disorder is a form of temporal lobe epilepsy called Geschwind Syndrome.

Stone received the Science and Society Award of the Forum on Physics and Society of the American Physics Society. In June 1985, he was awarded an honorary Doctor of Laws degree from Swarthmore College. And, in 1995, the Federation of American Scientists gave Stone its annual Public Service Award.

== Personal life ==
Stone was the son of journalist I. F. Stone and Esther Stone, and nephew of journalist and film critic Judy Stone. He resided, with his wife Betty Jane Stone, who predeceased him, in Carlsbad, California.

== In popular culture ==
The Stanford-based professor and hero of Michael Crichton's 1969 novel and movie The Andromeda Strain is named "Dr. Jeremy Stone". Stone was at Stanford in 1969, but unlike the fictional character was studying post-graduate economics, not biology. There is also a comic strip hero with the name Dr. Jeremy Stone, whose alter ego is the superbly muscled Maul.
