= I. F. Stone =

American investigative journalist, writer, and author (1907–1989)

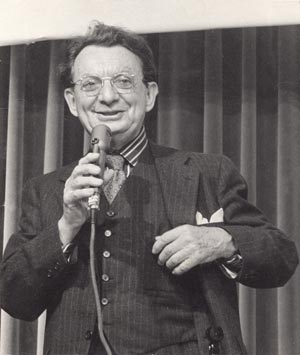
- Stone in April 1972
- Born: Isadore Feinstein; December 24, 1907; Philadelphia, Pennsylvania, U.S.
- Died: June 18, 1989 (aged 81); Boston, Massachusetts, U.S.
- Resting place: Mount Auburn Cemetery, Cambridge, Massachusetts
- Education: University of Pennsylvania
- Occupation: Investigative journalist
- Employer(s): New York Post, The Nation, PM
- Known for: I. F. Stone's Weekly
- Children: Inter alia, Jeremy, Christopher D.
- Relatives: Michael Boudin (nephew) Kathy Boudin (niece)
- Website: www.ifstone.org

Signature
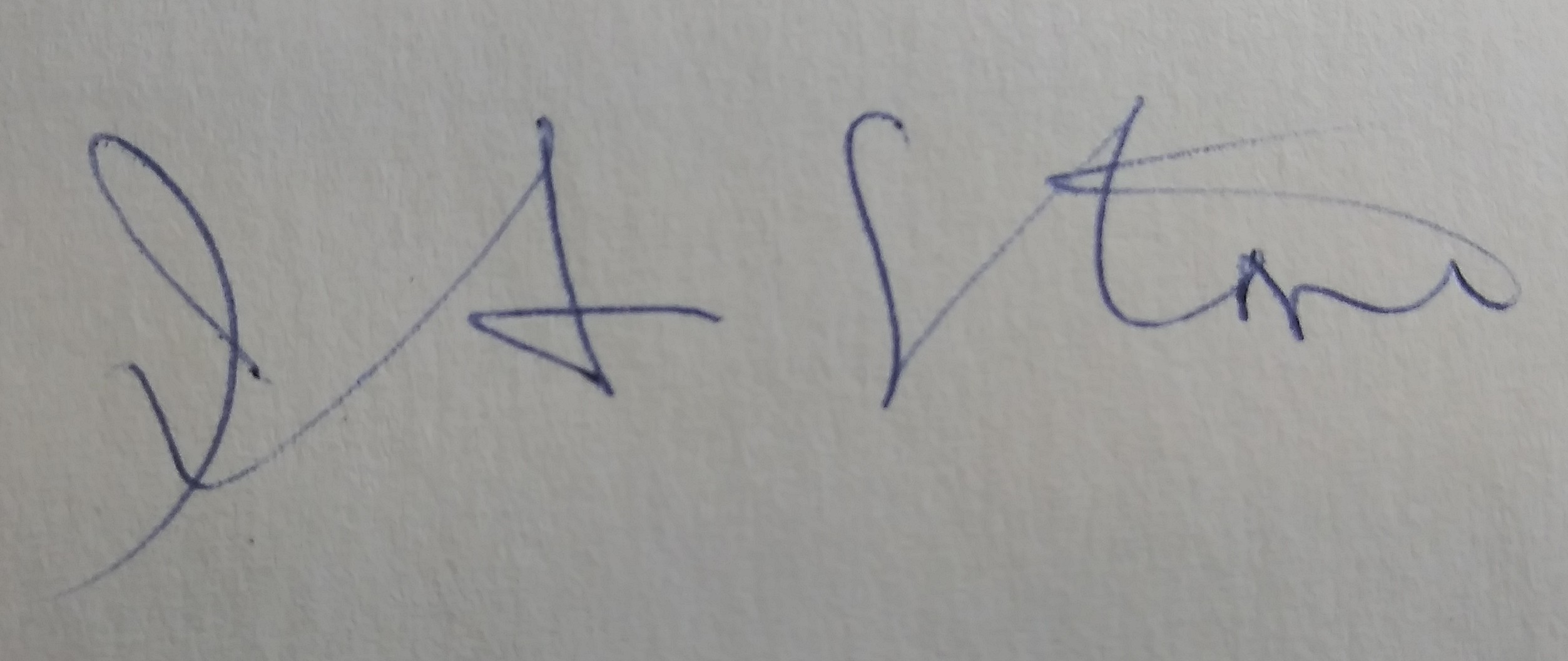

Isadore Feinstein Stone (December 24, 1907 – June 18, 1989) was an American investigative journalist, writer, and author.

Known for his politically progressive views, Stone is best remembered for I. F. Stone's Weekly (1953–1971), a newsletter which the New York University journalism department in 1999 ranked 16th among the top hundred works of journalism in the U.S. in the twentieth century and second place among print journalism publications.

== Early life ==
External videos
- Robert MacNeil Report
- November 14, 1975, segment starts at 3:00; American Archive of Public Broadcasting

Stone was born in Philadelphia, Pennsylvania, to Jewish Ukrainian immigrants who owned a shop in Haddonfield, New Jersey; the journalist and film critic Judy Stone was his sister.

Stone attended Haddonfield High School. He was ranked 49th in his graduating class of 52 students. His career as a journalist began in his second year of high school, when he founded The Progress newspaper. He later worked for the Haddonfield Press and for the Camden Courier-Post. After dropping out of the University of Pennsylvania, where he had studied philosophy, Stone joined The Philadelphia Inquirer, then known as the "Republican Bible of Pennsylvania".

After advice from a newspaper editor in 1937, Stone changed his professional journalistic byline from "Isadore Feinstein Stone" to I. F. Stone; the editor had told him that his political reportage would be better received if he minimized his Jewish identity. Years later, Stone acknowledged being remorseful about having changed his professional name, thereby yielding to the systemic antisemitism then prevalent in American society. Personally, Stone spoke of himself as "Izzy" throughout his life and career.

== Politics in the 1930s ==
Influenced by the social work of Jack London, Stone became a politically radical journalist and joined the Philadelphia Record (the morning edition rival of The Philadelphia Inquirer) owned by J. David Stern, a Democrat. Stone later worked for the New York Post newspaper after Stern bought it during 1929. In late adolescence, Stone joined the Socialist Party of America, a political decision influenced by his reading of the works of Karl Marx, Jack London, Peter Kropotkin and Herbert Spencer. Later, he quit the Socialist Party due to the intractable sectarian divisions, ideological and political, that existed among the organizations that constituted the American Left.

During the 1930s, Stone was an active member of the communist-dominated Popular Front, which opposed Adolf Hitler and National Socialism. On May 1, 1935, Stone joined the League of American Writers (1935–1943), whose members included Lillian Hellman, Dashiell Hammett, Frank Folsom, Alexander Trachtenberg, Louis Untermeyer, Myra Page, Millen Brand and Arthur Miller. (Members were largely either Communist Party members or fellow travelers.)

During the 1930s, as a left-wing journalist, Stone criticized Joseph Stalin's consolidation of power in the Soviet Union in an editorial for the New York Post (December 7, 1934) that denounced and likened Stalin's purge and execution of Soviet citizens to the political purges and executions occurring in Nazi Germany (1933–1945) and stated that Stalin's régime in Russia had adopted the tactics of "Fascist thugs and racketeers." As the Moscow Trials (1936–1938) proceeded, Stone attacked Stalin's actions as heralding a new Thermidor, which was the time of counterrevolution and reaction against the French Revolution (1789–1799). Additionally, Stone criticized Lenin and Trotsky for their "cruel and bloody ruthlessness" in executing the Romanov family. He scolded the US Socialist Workers Party, then followers of Trotsky, for believing he would have been less repressive than Stalin.

In 1939, following the signing of the Molotov–Ribbentrop Pact, he wrote to a friend that he would do "no more fellow traveling" for the USSR, and used his opinion column in The Nation magazine to denounce Joseph Stalin as "the Moscow Machiavelli who suddenly found peace as divisible as the Polish plains and marshes". Stone bitterly denounced the Molotov–Ribbentrop Pact in public and in private as a betrayal of leftist political principles.

== Affiliations ==
A former editor of The Nation, Victor Navasky, said that plain, solid work characterized Stone's investigative journalism. He was an old-school reporter who did his homework and perused public-domain records (official government and private-industry documents) for the facts and figures, the data, and quotations that would substantiate his reportage about the matters of the day.

As a liberal, politically outspoken reporter from the American left wing, Stone often had to work in ideologically hostile environments (military, diplomatic, business) where information was controlled, making verifiability the essence of his journalism, corroborated by facts in the public domain, which the reader could verify. About his style of work as an investigative journalist, Stone said:

I made no claims to 'inside stuff'. I tried to give information which could be documented, so [that] the reader could check it for himself ... Reporters tend to be absorbed by the bureaucracies they cover; they take on the habits, attitudes, and even accents of the military or the diplomatic corps. Should a reporter resist the pressure, there are many ways to get rid of him. ... But a reporter covering the whole capital on his own – particularly if he is his own employer – is immune from these [political] pressures.

The journalistic professionalism and integrity of I. F. Stone derived from his intellectual willingness to scour and devour public documents, to bury himself in The Congressional Record, to study the transcripts of obscure congressional committee hearings, debates and reports. He prospected for news nuggets – published as boxed paragraphs in his weekly newsletter – such as contradictions in the line of official policy, examples of bureaucratic mendacity and political obscurantism. Stone especially sought evidence of the U.S. government's legalistic incursions against the civil liberties and the civil and political rights of American citizens.

=== The New York Post ===
In 1933, Stone worked as a reporter for the New York Post newspaper. He supported the politics of U.S. President Franklin Delano Roosevelt (1933–1945), especially the progressive reforms of the New Deal (1935–1938) programs FDR was instituting to rescue the U.S. economy from the poverty imposed by the Great Depression which started in 1929. In his first book, The Court Disposes (1937), Stone criticized what he described as the politically reactionary role of the U.S. Supreme Court in blocking the realization of the socio-economic reform programs of the New Deal.

In the course of working as publisher and reporter, J. David Stern and Stone quarreled about journalism, its practice, and its practices, especially about the content and tone of Stone's New York Post editorials critical of a business plan to refinance the public transit system of New York City. After an acrimonious quarrelling, Stern's concern about Stone's attitude prompted an inter-office note to Stone and the managing editor, informing them that, henceforth, he was part of the news department staff.

In response to his publisher's management decision – subordinating a reporter to the newsroom managing editor – Stone complained to the Newspaper Guild, presenting his case against the managers of the newspaper for unfair labor practices. The Post contested the case, which proceeded to an arbitration hearing that ruled against Stone, who consequently resigned from the Post's staff.

=== The Nation ===
In 1939, after leaving the New York Post, Stone worked for The Nation, first as associate editor and then as its Washington, D.C., editor. Two years later, in the book Business as Usual: The First Year of Defense (1941), Stone reported on perceived flaws of the early stages of America's WW2 preparation. He alleged inefficient planning and execution, and the business-as-usual attitude, of the industrial and business monopolies — and its tolerance by the U.S. military — that resulted in the tardy production of matériel for the Arsenal of Democracy with which President F. D. Roosevelt said the U.S. would help Europeans and Asians combat the totalitarianism of National Socialist German Workers Party, fascist Italy and Imperial Japan.

On August 4, 1939, Stone along with 400 other writers and intellectuals signed a letter condemning anti-Soviet attitudes in the United States, called for better relations between the two countries, described the USSR as a supporter of world peace, and said "The Soviet Union considers political dictatorship a transitional form and has shown a steadily expanding democracy". The letter was published in September 1939 shortly after the Molotov–Ribbentrop Pact was known in the United States and during the same month that the Soviet invasion of Poland began. Upon hearing of the Pact, Stone repudiated the letter and denounced the actions of the Soviet Union and would criticize it and the CPUSA, which repeated the views of the USSR about the war. In return the CPUSA denounced him as one of the leading "Imperialist war-mongers" until Operation Barbarossa which caused a change in communist views of the war."

In the matter of war-production employment, Stone's exposé of alleged institutional racism and anti–Semitism of the FBI's process for vetting job applicants is evident in the semantics of questions meant to discover, identify and exclude political subversives from civil service in the U.S. government. He characterized questions the FBI asked about job applicants as ideological and bigoted, such as, "Does he mix with Negroes?", "Does he ... have too many Jewish friends?", "Does he think the colored races are as good as the white?", "Why do you suppose he has hired so many Jews?" and "Is he always criticizing Vichy France?" All which Stone believed were poor questions to ask during a war in which collaborationist Vichy France (1940–44) actively participated in the military occupation as the puppet régime of France. To the mainstream American reader concerned with the affairs of daily life, Stone reported that, "Questions like these are being used as a sieve to strain anti-fascists and liberals out of the government. They serve no other purpose.". Readers thanked The Nation for Stone's informing the public of the FBI's racist, fascistic and anti-Semitic un–American activities. Concomitantly, some on the American political right wing criticized Stone for maintaining the anonymity of his FBI sources.

In 1946 Freda Kirchwey, the editor (1933–55) of The Nation, fired Stone from the magazine for accepting employment with the newspaper PM (picture magazine) as a foreign correspondent covering the anti–British Jewish Resistance Movement in Mandatory Palestine (1920–48), where the Jews awaited the foundation of the State of Israel.

=== PM (newspaper) ===
Stone was the Washington, D.C., correspondent for PM, and published a series of feature articles about the Jewish European refugees who ran the British blockade to reach Palestine. He later further developed that reportage from the summer of 1946 and wrote the book Underground to Palestine. In 1948 Picture Magazine closed, and was replaced in Stone's career first by the New York Star (1948-1949) and then by The Daily Compass, published until 1952.

=== I. F. Stone's Weekly ===
Although Stone had been a mainstream journalist in the 1930s, appearing on shows like Meet the Press (then a radio show), in 1950 he found himself blacklisted and unable to get work, possibly because Stone publicly admitted to his "fellow traveler" tendencies. In 1953, inspired by the example of the muckraking journalist George Seldes and his political weekly, In Fact, Stone started his own independent newsletter, I. F. Stone's Weekly. Over the next few years, Stone's newsletter campaigned against McCarthyism and racial discrimination in the United States.

During this period he supported the Fair Play for Cuba Committee.

In 1964, using evidence drawn from a close reading and analysis of published accounts, Stone was the only American journalist to challenge President Lyndon B. Johnson's account of the Gulf of Tonkin incident. During the 1960s, Stone continued to criticize the Vietnam War. At its peak in the 1960s, the Weekly only had a circulation of 70,000, but it was regarded as very influential.

Articles originally published in I. F. Stone's Weekly later were compiled and published in The I. F. Stone's Weekly Reader (1973), in three of six volumes of A Nonconformist History of Our Times (1989), a compendium of Stone's writing, and The Best of I.F. Stone (2006).

== Views ==
=== Zionism and the State of Israel ===
In 1945, at war's end, Stone went to Mandatory Palestine (1920–1948) to report on the mass emigration of Eastern European Jews to Mandatory Palestine—peoples whom the Nazis had displaced from the countries of Eastern Europe. In Underground to Palestine (1948), Stone reported that the political, financial and personal interests of those displaced Jews would have been, in his opinion, better served by emigrating to the U.S. rather than to the Zionist Homeland for the Jewish people promised in the Balfour Declaration. Nonetheless, they preferred the promise of Israel in Stone's estimation because:

They have been kicked around as Jews, and now they want to live as Jews. Over and over I heard it said: 'We want to build a Jewish country ... We are tired of putting our sweat and blood into places where we are not welcome. ... ' These Jews want the right to live as a people, to build as a people, to make their contribution to the world as a people. Are their national aspirations any less worthy of respect than those of any other oppressed people?

As a secular Jew, Stone agreed with the nationalist aspirations of Zionism and publicly supported the State of Israel (1948), before the U.S. government granted official recognition. As a politically moderate Zionist, and like the politician Abba Eban, Stone supported the one-state solution of Israel as a bi-national state that Jews and Arabs would inhabit as equal citizens. Yet, in observing the military conflict that established the Jewish state in Mandatory Palestine, Stone became sympathetic to the Arab resistance to their physical dispossession (jobs, homes, land) and the political disenfranchisement (voided civil and political rights).

Stone's reportage of the conflict in the Middle East irritated Minister Eban, both for embarrassing him (a politically moderate Zionist) and his government and for dimming the international public image of the State of Israel as a refuge for oppressed peoples.

=== The Arab–Israeli conflict ===
The Sykes–Picot Agreement (1916) established the imperial spheres of influence of France (blue), Britain (red) and Russia (green) in the former Ottoman Empire (1299–1922). After WWII (1939–45), that partitioning of the Middle East facilitated the establishment of the State of Israel (1948) within the Mandate of Palestine (purple).

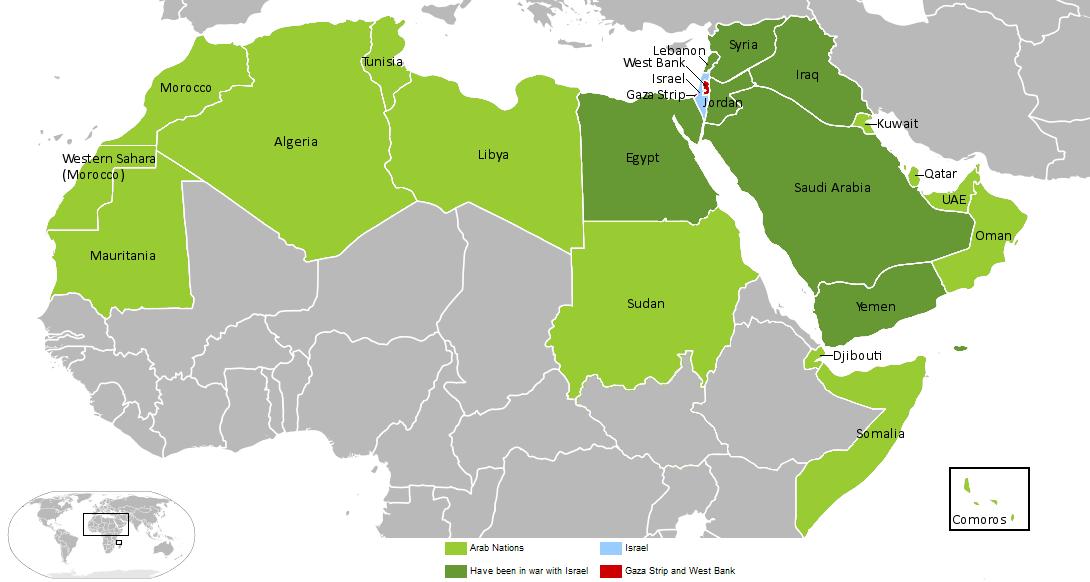
The geopolitics of the Soviet–American Cold War (1945–90) extended the Arab–Israeli conflict (1948 to date) beyond Palestine.

The practical and professional consequences of being an openly left-wing journalist in the U. S. continued for I. F. Stone, when the U.S. State Department refused to issue a passport for him to travel overseas as a journalist. Stone filed a lawsuit against the State Department. In court, his brother-in-law, the attorney Leonard Boudin, established the right of a journalist to freely travel in the course of practicing his profession, and so thwarted the federal government's political interference with a journalist; afterwards, Stone travelled to Israel in 1956—before the Suez War (October 29 – November 7, 1956)—and reported that:

Israel is a transformed country. What was once a struggling country is now a thriving country. Economically, it's booming. It will win – it's prepared for war and will win, you know, the next war, or the next war after that, militarily ... But there will be wars and wars and wars until Israel comes to terms with the Palestinians ... [because] the road to peace lies through the Palestinian refugee camp.

Consequent to the establishment of British, French, and Russian imperial spheres of influence in Asia Minor, by way of the Sykes–Picot Agreement (1916), the internal politics of the State of Israel became the Arab–Israeli conflict (1948 to date), which the West conflated to the geopolitics of the Cold War (1945–90) with each belligerent party, the U.S. and the USSR, claiming hegemony over the Middle East.

In the book review article "Holy War" (Les Temps Modernes, June 1967), Stone said that superpower geopolitics are of secondary importance to the discontent of the Arabs and the Jews in the Levant.

=== The Korean War ===
Stone was critical of the Cold War, and its consequent reductions of the civil liberties and the civil and political rights of American citizens – what he saw as totalitarianism effected with the moral panic of loyalty oaths and the Second Red Scare (1947–57) of the McCarthy Era — Stone wrote a book on the origin of the Korean War (1950–52). According to Stone, in an effort to convince the American people to support and fight in a war between two undemocratic Asian countries, U.S. government propaganda misrepresented the Korean War as necessary to the rollback fight against the international communist conspiracy for world domination, with Joseph Stalin controlling the conspiracy from Moscow.

In The Hidden History of the Korean War, 1950–51, Stone said that South Korea had provoked North Korea to war, by way of continual guerrilla attacks across the border (38th parallel) into the north of Korea, and that, thus goaded, the North Koreans eventually counterattacked, and invaded the South, providing the official casus belli (June 25, 1950) required for Korean reunification. Stone asserted that such cross-border attacks, authorized by the South Korean government, were shaped by U.S. foreign policy for the worldwide containment of communism, which was advocated by John Foster Dulles, realized in the field by General Douglas MacArthur, U.S. commander in the Pacific Ocean military theater, and countenanced by Syngman Rhee, the strongman President of South Korea.

== Allegations of espionage ==
=== Oleg Kalugin's comments ===
In The Independent newspaper in 1992, British journalist Andrew Brown reported that the Soviet Embassy attaché, KGB Major General Oleg Kalugin, said that, "We had an agent—a well-known American journalist—with a good reputation, who severed his ties with us after 1956. I, myself, convinced him to resume them. But, in 1968, after the invasion of Czechoslovakia ... he said he would never again take any money from us."

In "How Many I. F. Stones Were There?", Herbert Romerstein, formerly of USIA and of the HUAC, and Ray Kerrison reported that Kalugin had identified I. F. Stone as the secret agent of whom he [Kalugin] had spoken with the journalist Andrew Brown. Eight years later, in The Venona Secrets (2000), Romerstein and Eric Breindel (editorial page editor of the New York Post) developed Kalugin's allegations about I. F. Stone being a secret agent for the Soviet Union.

In "The Attack on I.F. Stone", Andrew Brown said that when he "used the phrase an agent, to describe someone who turned out to be I. F. Stone", he understood the term metaphorically, meaning someone who was a "useful contact", and that the expression "take any money" referred to the fact that the journalist I.F. Stone would not permit a Soviet embassy employee to pay for a luncheon meal, neither then nor in the future, despite earlier lunches in the 1930s and 1940s. That, in September 1992, at the Moscow Journalists' Club, Kalugin had explained to the lawyer Martin Garbus that, "I have no proof that Stone was an agent. I have no proof that Stone ever received any money from the KGB, or the Russian government, I never gave Stone any money and was never involved with him as an agent."

In "Who's Out to Lunch Here?: I. F. Stone and the KGB", Cassandra Tate said that the alleged evidence of Stone's secret agent involvement with the KGB is based upon a few lines of text at the end of a speech by a KGB officer. She concluded that Stone was neither a Soviet agent, nor a collaborator of the KGB in the U.S.

In American Radical:The Life and Times of I. F. Stone, 2009), D. D. Guttenplan cited Kalugin's denials in The Nation and in the New York Post, although an earlier article had pointed to the possible ambiguity of the KGB's definition of the term "agent of influence." In multiple interviews, Kalugin contradicted Romerstein's allegation that Stone was a Soviet secret agent; two Stone biographers reported Kalugin's third-party denials that Stone was a Soviet secret agent. Myra MacPherson (All Governments Lie! The Life and Times of Rebel Journalist I. F. Stone, 2006) reported that Kalugin said: "We had no clandestine relationship. We had no secret arrangement. I was the press officer [of the Soviet embassy in Washington, D.C.] ... I never paid him anything. I sometimes bought lunch."

In his KGB memoirs, The First Directorate: My 32 Years in Intelligence and Espionage Against the West (1994), about working as a press attaché in the Soviet Embassy in Washington, D.C., Kalugin said that, besides I. F. Stone, he often met with journalists such as Walter Lippmann, Joseph Kraft, Drew Pearson, Chalmers Johnson, and Murray Marder. That Stone occasionally had a working-lunch with the Soviet press-attaché on shift, but ended that luncheon relationship after his first visit to the Soviet Union in 1956, and after hearing On the Personality Cult and its Consequences (February 26, 1956), the secret speech with which Nikita Khrushchev denounced the tyranny of Josef Stalin. When he returned from the Soviet Union, in his weekly newsletter, Stone wrote:

Whatever the consequences, I have to say what I really feel, after seeing the Soviet Union, and carefully studying the statements of its leading officials. This is not a good society and it is not led by honest men ... Nothing has happened in Russia to justify cooperation abroad, between the independent Left and the Communists.

Stone's published statements, about the Soviet Union, its regimented society, and its totalitarian government, by the Communist Party of the Soviet Union (CPSU), provoked hundreds of subscribers to cancel their subscriptions to I.F. Stone's Weekly newsletter. Kalugin said that he persuaded Stone to continue having working-luncheons with him, but that, after the Warsaw Pact invasion of Czechoslovakia in August 1968, Stone refused to let Kalugin pay for the lunch, and consequently ceased meeting with him.

=== Venona Project ===
In 1995, the National Security Agency (NSA) published documents from the Venona Project (1943–80), a counter-intelligence program for the collection and decryption of KGB and GRU telegraph messages, collected from 1943 to 1980. On September 13, 1944, the KGB station in New York City transmitted a message to Moscow that Vladimir Pravdin, an NKVD officer working undercover as a reporter for TASS (the Telegraph Agency of the Soviet Union), had sought to communicate with a Soviet agent code-named BLIN, in Washington, DC, but that BLIN had been avoiding a meeting with Pravdin, claiming that his work schedule did not permit the requested meeting. He reported that Samuel Krafsur, an American NKVD agent codenamed IDE, who worked for TASS in the building that housed Stone's office, had tried to "sound him out, but BLIN did not react."

The Venona project transcript No. 1506 (October 23, 1944), indicated that Pravdin had succeeded in meeting with secret agent BLIN, and that he was "not refusing his aid" but explained that had "three children, and did not want to attract the attention of the FBI" and that BLIN's reluctance to meet Pravdin derived from "his unwillingness to spoil his career" because he "earned $1,500.00 per month but ... would not be averse to having a supplemental income."

In the article "Cables Coming in From the Cold" on the Venona Project transcripts, Walter Schneir and Miriam Schneir said that interpreting the transcriptions is difficult, because of the hearsay nature of the messages; the many steps between a conversation and the sending of a cable; language-translation difficulties; the possibility of an imperfect decryption; and concluded that "the Venona messages are not like the old TV show You Are There [1953–57], in which history was re‑enacted before our eyes. They are history seen through a glass, darkly."

In their Cold War history, Venona: Decoding Soviet Espionage in America (2000), John Earl Haynes and Harvey Klehr said that Stone was the Soviet secret agent BLIN. They cited four Venona cables that mentioned Stone and that two of the cables contained evidence of Stone's pro–Soviet espionage. As well, the files of the KGB, from 1936 to 1939, indicate that Stone was a Soviet secret agent, who worked as a talent spotter, as a courier to other secret agents, and that he provided private and journalistic information to KGB, and Stone collaborated with the Communist Victor Perlo group, who gave him materials for use in journalistic exposés.

Moreover, in The Venona Secrets: The Definitive Exposé of Soviet Espionage in America (2000), Herbert Romerstein and Eric Breindel re-published the allegation that Stone was the Soviet secret agent BLIN. As evidence, they cited Stone's statement, in a column (November 11, 1951) that responded to New York Herald Tribune reportage about his left wing sympathies, and that he would be unsurprised to read in that newspaper, "that I was smuggled in from Pinsk, in a carton of blintzes". That Stone's use of the word blintzes (pancakes) betrayed his knowledge of the word BLIN, his code name as a Soviet secret agent.

In the event, Stone's biographer Myra MacPherson said that the FBI never identified BLIN as being Stone and instead suspected Ernest K. Lindley, who also was father to three children. The FBI claimed that secret agent BLIN must have been someone "whose true, pro–Soviet sympathies were not known to the public", hence, could not have been the journalist Stone, who, on the contrary, far from being "fearful", did not hide his left wing beliefs. Rather than wishing to avoid FBI attention, as BLIN reportedly did, Stone made a point of suggesting to the Soviet press attaché Oleg Kalugin that they have lunch at Harvey's, a favorite haunt of FBI director J. Edgar Hoover, to "tweak his nose".

=== Alexander Vassiliev's allegations of espionage ===
In Spies: The Rise and Fall of the KGB in America (2009), Klehr, Haynes, and Alexander Vassiliev, formerly of the KGB, cite a KGB file (which Vassiliev saw in the Soviet Union) that named "Isadore Feinstein, a commentator for the New York Post" in the 1930s, as being secret agent BLIN, who "entered the channel of normal operational work" in 1936. A note listed BLIN as an agent of the KGB station in New York City, in 1938. Klehr, Haynes, and Vassiliev said that Stone "assisted Soviet intelligence on a number of tasks, ranging from doing some talent spotting, acting as a courier, by relaying information to other agents, and providing private journalist tidbits and data [that] the KGB found interesting".

BLIN was to help recruit and support the German resistance to Nazism in Berlin, from 1936 to 1938. Yet the authors admitted that Stone broke with the KGB after the Nazi–Soviet Pact of 1939, and speculate that later Soviet communications with Stone were meant to reactivate their previous relationship. As such, Klehr, Haynes, and Vassiliev conclude that: "The documentary record shows that I. F. Stone consciously cooperated with Soviet intelligence, from 1936 through 1938, [Stone's Popular Front period]. An effort was made, by Soviet intelligence, to reestablish that relationship in 1944–45; we do not know whether that effort succeeded. To put it plainly, from 1936 to 1939 I. F. Stone was a Soviet spy".

In the article "Commentary's Trumped-up Case Against I. F. Stone", Jim Naureckas counters that the allegations of Klehr, Haynes, and Vassiliev, if true, merely indicate that I. F. Stone was "just gossiping", and criticizes them their "nefarious" and "tendentious" magnification of "relatively innocuous behavior" on the basis of one anti–Nazi activity. As for Stone being listed as an "agent" of the KGB, Naureckas said that Walter Lippmann also is listed as a Soviet secret agent.

In the article "I.F. Stone: Encounters with Soviet Intelligence", Max Holland said there is no question that I. F. Stone was a "fully recruited and witting agent" for the Soviet Union from 1936 to 1938; yet, admits that Stone "was not a 'spy' in that he did not engage in espionage, and had no access to classified material".

In the book review of Spies: The Rise and Fall of the KGB in America (May 25, 2009), D. D. Guttenplan said that "Spies never explains why we should believe KGB officers, pushed to justify their existence (and expense accounts), when they claim information comes from an elaborately recruited 'agent' rather than merely a source or contact". That the authors of Spies distort the report in Venona transcript No. 1506 (October 1944) and never prove that, in 1936, Soviet secret agent BLIN was I. F. Stone. That their allegations merely demonstrate that Stone "was a good reporter", and notes that Walter Lippmann is quoted in Spies as having professional contacts with "a Soviet journalist with whom he traded insights and information." This is the same man [Pravdin] whom Stone is said to have avoided. Nonetheless, the Vassilev notebook shows that Lippman was meeting Pravdin, not to pass the intelligence to him, but rather to find out what the true intentions of the Soviet government were. One of the KGB reports said, "He [Lippmann] is attempting to use his acquaintance with him [Pravdin] to determine our viewpoint on various issues of international politics. He is doing this, of course, very subtly, with the utmost tact. It should be recognized that by attempting to draw 'Sergei' into making candid comments, Imperialist [Lippmann] is sharing his own information with him".

In the book review of Spies: The Rise and Fall of the KGB in America (2010), Myra MacPherson said that the American co-author of the book, the journalist Max Holland, had persistently repeated discredited allegations that the American journalist I. F. Stone had accepted money from the Soviet Union, despite Holland's having acknowledged the unreliability of his source, KGB Gen. Oleg Kalugin:

As for the conflicting tales, woven by former KGB agent Kalugin, about his relationship with Stone, from 1966 to 1968, Holland correctly notes that 'Kalugin seemed incapable of telling the same story more than once'. Still, this did not keep Holland from repeating the damaging and long-refuted lie that Herbert Romerstein, former HUAC sleuth, developed after talking with Kalugin, that Moscow Gold [sic] subsidized Stone's weekly. Nowhere is there any evidence that Stone took money for anything, except a possible lunch or two. Nor is there any evidence, as Holland points out, that Kalugin was able to plant [news] stories with Stone.

== Retirement and classical scholarship ==
In 1971, angina pectoris forced Stone to cease publication of the Weekly. After his retirement, he returned to the University of Pennsylvania, where he had dropped out years before. He earned a bachelor's degree in classical languages. Stone successfully learned Ancient Greek and wrote a book about the prosecution and death of Socrates, The Trial of Socrates, in which he argued that Socrates wanted to be sentenced to death to shame Athenian democracy, which he despised. The Trial of Socrates was a New York Times bestseller and was translated into 11 languages.

In 1970, Stone received the George Polk Award, and in 1976 he received the Conscience-in-Media Award from the American Society of Journalists and Authors.

== Personal life and death ==
In 1929, Stone married Esther Roisman, who later worked as his assistant at I. F. Stone's Weekly. Their marriage produced three children, Celia, Jeremy, and Christopher. Esther's sister Jean, a poet, was the wife of radical lawyer Leonard Boudin. (Stone was thus the uncle of Weather Underground co-founder Kathy Boudin and conservative U.S. judge Michael Boudin.) The Stones' marriage lasted for sixty years. In 1989, Stone died of a heart attack in Boston at the age of 81.

== Legacy ==
=== Memorial awards ===
On March 5, 2008, Harvard's Nieman Foundation for Journalism announced plans to award an annual I. F. Stone Medal for Journalistic Independence and an associated I. F. Stone Workshop on Strengthening Journalistic Independence.

In 2008, the Park Center for Independent Media at the Roy H. Park School of Communications created the Izzy Award. The award goes to "an independent outlet, journalist, or producer for contributions to our culture, politics, or journalism created outside traditional corporate structures" for "special achievement in independent media".

=== Documentaries ===
On May 6, 2015, the non-profit peace organization, Catalytic Diplomacy, released The Legacy of I.F. Stone, Part One and Part Two, a pair of documentary videos exploring the legacy and influence of I. F. Stone and I.F. Stone's Weekly.

In 2016, the film ALL GOVERNMENTS LIE: Truth, Deception, and the Spirit of I.F. Stone was released; a documentary on independent journalism in which the work and principles of I.F. Stone as an outcast journalist articulate the narrative.

=== Archive ===
The entire run of I.F. Stone's Weekly from January 17, 1953, through December 1, 1971, can be accessed through the ifstone.org website, along with many of Stone's speeches and other writings, and the documentary videos The Legacy of I.F. Stone, Part One and The Legacy of I.F. Stone, Part Two.

=== Music ===
Composer Scott Johnson makes extensive use of Stone's voice taken from a recorded 1981 lecture in his large-scale musical work, How It Happens, completed in 1991 on commission for the Kronos Quartet.

=== Nobel Prize ===
He was nominated for the Nobel Peace Prize in 1967 and for the Nobel Prize in Literature in 1974.

=== Influences ===
The 2008 Democratic presidential candidate John Edwards listed Stone's The Trial of Socrates as one of his three favorite books.

== Honors ==
- Honorary Degrees from American University, Brown University, Colby University, New School for Social Research, Reed College, the University of Pennsylvania, and the University of Southern California.
- Newspaper Guild of New York Honors Page One Must for "Underground to Palestine" awarded in 1947
- The Eleanor Roosevelt Award
- The George Polk Award of Long Island University
- American Library Association Intellectual Freedom Award
- Johns Hopkins University School of Advanced International Studies Award
- Lifetime Achievement Award from Haddonfield High School (I. F. Stone's high school)
- A. J. Liebling Award for Journalistic Distinction
- Columbia University Journalism Award
- National Press Club Journalists' Journalist Award
- The American Civil Liberties Union Award
- The First Amendment Defender Award of the Catholic University's Columbus School of Law
- The Florina Lasker Civil Liberties Award from the New York Civil Liberties Union
- The Grand Prix Charles-Leopold Mayer of the French Academy of Sciences, November 1977
- The Sidney Hillman Foundation Award
- The Professional Freedom and Responsibility Award of the Association for Education in Journalism and Mass Communications

== Publications ==
=== Books ===
- The Court Disposes (1937)
- Business as Usual (1941)
- Underground to Palestine (1946) ISBN 0-394-50274-4
- This is Israel (1948)
- The Killings at Kent State (1971) LCCN 73148389
- The I. F. Stone's Weekly Reader (1973) ISBN 0-394-48815-6
- The Trial of Socrates (Anchor Books, 1988) ISBN 0-385-26032-6
- A Nonconformist History of Our Times (Little, Brown and Company, 1989)
  - The War Years, 1939–1945. ISBN 0-316-81777-5
  - The Hidden History of the Korean War, 1950–1951. ISBN 0-316-81770-8
  - The Truman Era, 1945–1952. ISBN 0-394-71908-5
  - The Haunted Fifties, 1953–1963. ISBN 0-394-70547-5
  - In a Time of Torment, 1961–1967. ISBN 0-224-61464-9
  - Polemics and Prophecies, 1967–1970. ISBN 0-316-81747-3
- The Best of I.F. Stone (PDF) (1st ed.). New York: Public Affairs. 2006. ISBN 158648463X. ISBN 978-1-58648-463-7

=== Periodicals ===
- I.F. Stone's Weekly, January 17, 1953, through December 1, 1971
- Stone, I. F. (October 20, 1967). The Spirit of Che Guevara. London: New Statesman.
- I. F. Stone (1971–1989) – New York Review of Books
