= Barbara Hatch Rosenberg =

American molecular biologist (1928–2026)

Barbara Hatch Rosenberg Cavalieri (June 26, 1928 – March 14, 2026) was an American molecular biologist. She was an expert in biological and chemical weapons. "A molecular biologist, Dr. Hatch Rosenberg was a founder of the Federation of American Scientists’ Working Group on Biological and Chemical Weapons and a former adviser to the Clinton White House when the anthrax scare startled an America that had recently been wounded by the attacks of Sept. 11, 2001." Rosenberg died on March 14, 2026, at the age of 97.
