= Judy Stone (journalist) =

American journalist

- Born: May 1, 1924; Philadelphia, Pennsylvania, U.S.
- Died: October 6, 2017 (aged 93); San Francisco, California, U.S.
- Occupations: Journalist, film critic
- Employers: San Francisco Chronicle; The New York Times; Los Angeles Times
- Relatives: I. F. Stone (brother); Jeremy Stone (nephew)

Judy Stone (May 1, 1924 – October 6, 2017) was an American journalist and film critic who wrote film reviews for the San Francisco Chronicle from 1961 to 1993.

== Biography ==
Stone was born in Philadelphia, Pennsylvania, to Russian Jewish immigrants who owned a dry goods store. She was the youngest of four children, all of whom became journalists, including her brother I. F. Stone. Her interest in journalism came early when she wrote a film review of The General Died at Dawn for the student newspaper at Jay Cooke Junior High School.

Stone dropped out of school to make walkie-talkies in a factory during World War II. However, she remained in publishing as managing editor for her labor union's newspaper. Following the war, she settled in San Francisco, working as a reporter for the Marin Independent Journal and, later, at the copy desk at the San Francisco Chronicle. Around 1965, she transferred to the Chronicle's Datebook section.

Stone also wrote for The New York Times, the Los Angeles Times, and many other national newspapers and magazines. Her books include The Mystery of B. Traven (1977), Eye on the World: Conversations With International Filmmakers (1997), and Not Quite a Memoir: Of Film, Books, the World (2006).

Stone died at her Potrero Hill home in San Francisco on October 6, 2017, at the age of 93.

== See also ==
- Rosie the Riveter
