= Star Wars: Force Commander =

2000 video game

- North American box art
- Developers: LucasArts; Ronin Entertainment
- Publisher: LucasArts
- Director: Garry M. Gaber
- Designer: Garry M. Gaber
- Programmer: Edward Kilham
- Artist: Garry M. Gaber
- Writer: Garry M. Gaber
- Composer: Peter McConnell
- Series: Star Wars
- Platform: Windows
- Release: NA: March 21, 2000; EU: April 1, 2000
- Genre: Real-time strategy
- Modes: Single-player, multiplayer

Star Wars: Force Commander is a 2000 real-time strategy video game co-developed by LucasArts and Ronin Entertainment and published by LucasArts for Microsoft Windows. The game's plot interweaves between Star Wars: A New Hope and Return of the Jedi, taking place in key battles. Peter McConnell created remixed tracks of John Williams's original score with influences from hard rock and techno music.

The game received mixed reviews; critics cited poor controls as a primary issue and were divided on the quality of the game's visuals, with some calling them dated and others considering them strong. Gameplay was generally considered simpler than other real-time strategy games.

== Gameplay ==
Force Commander is the first Star Wars strategy game to be rendered fully in 3D. Previous games used sprites and textured backgrounds.

Star Wars: Force Commander is a real-time strategy video game. The player commands forces as though they are the commander rather than an infantry unit. The game utilizes a birds-eye view around a 3D map. The levels are largely plot-focused, with initial levels playing as the Imperial faction against the Rebellion, whilst as the plot progresses and the character defects to the Rebellion, players then fight against the Imperials. Levels are ground assault based, as the game lacks space combat. Outsides of the main story-mode Campaign, scenarios can be re-played under the Scenario option, and players can set up their own battles in the Skirmish mode where up to four sides can compete against one another, though they only have the faction choice of Imperials or the Rebellion.

The game has multiple networked multiplayer options. Up to six players can join, and Local area network (LAN) and TCP/IP connections are supported. The game was supported by the defunct Microsoft Gaming Zone. LAN gameplay is limited to two players. Multiplayer mode has an instant action mode but no campaign mode. Players can choose any combination of teams or work together to challenge the computer player.

== Plot ==
The game interweaves an original story between the events of Star Wars: A New Hope and Return of the Jedi, sometimes intersecting with known Star Wars events. It is shown from the point of view of a young officer in the Imperial Navy, Brenn Tantor, who begins as a stormtrooper, but soon enough is given his own command. The first task (from the training missions) is to search for an escape pod that landed on Tatooine, and then track the droids that were inside. This is a reference to the opening scenes of Episode IV when C-3PO and R2-D2 escape the Empire via an escape pod which crashes on Tatooine.

The main character is loyal to the Empire for the first half of the game, until his brother, Dellis Tantor, discovers that the Empire killed their father. Dellis is imprisoned by the Empire for revealing this information, though Brenn is initially led to believe that Dellis has been killed. Brenn defects to the Rebel Alliance and proceeds to fight his former commanders. In addition to the Tatooine training missions, the player participates in the Battle of Hoth from the Imperial point of view, and the Battle of Endor as a Rebel. The game ends with the battle to capture the Imperial Palace on Coruscant, and ultimately the liberation of Dellis.

== Development ==
Originally conceived as a 2D strategy game, LucasArts canceled the overall design after its first public viewing at E3 1998. LucasArts instead used an optimized version of a 3D engine supplied by Ronin Entertainment, delaying the game from its original late 1998 or early 1999 release timeframe to an early 2000 release. The company said it took the time to ensure innovation in this competitive genre on no exact deadline. The game was jointly developed by LucasArts and Ronin Entertainment, using Ronin's programmers and engine partnered with LucasArts's project leadership, designers, and artists. The final patch for the game is version 1.1 released in March 2000. The soundtrack consists of hard rock and techno remixes of John Williams' original Star Wars scores, done by Peter McConnell. More than 3,500 voice lines were recorded for the game.

== Reception ==
Reception

Aggregate score
Aggregator	Score
GameRankings	58%

Review scores
Publication	Score
AllGame	3/5
CNET Gamecenter	3/10
Computer Games Strategy Plus	3/5
Computer Gaming World	2/5
EP Daily	7/10
GameRevolution	D
GameSpot	6/10
GameZone	8/10
IGN	4.7/10
Next Generation	2/5
PC Accelerator	3/10
PC Gamer (US)	43%
PC Zone	81%

Star Wars: Force Commander received mixed reviews according to the review aggregation website GameRankings. Greg Kasavin of GameSpot cited dated graphics, ineffective controls, and flawed gameplay as reason the game "falls short of its ambitious intent". Kasavin conceded the game "has some good ideas. Its campaign has an involving plot and interesting mission objectives", and praised the 3D mission briefings. Mark Hill of PC Zone said that playing from the perspective of the Galactic Empire was a "nice twist, but merely dumping this style of game into the Star Wars universe is not innovative enough." Nick Woods of AllGame said that the game's 3D models were "blocky and not detailed" and added that there are "many other RTS games on the market better than this one". Chris Kramer of NextGen said, "Another in a long string of Star Wars misses, Force Commander is not as bad as Rebellion, but isn't even as good as Myth II or Warzone 2100." Brian Wright of GamePro said, "All in all, Force Commander feels incomplete. While a lot of care has gone into certain parts of the game, much of it seems to have been thrown in without a second thought. Star Wars fans will certainly get a kick out of reliving scenes from the movies, like hunting for the droids on Tatooine, but the game's many flaws prevent Force Commander from bringing the ultimate Star Wars battle experience to your home PC." (Note: GamePro gave the game two 3/5 scores for graphics and fun factor, 4/5 for sound, and 2.5/5 for control.)

The game won the award for "Most Disappointing Game of the Year" at GameSpot's Best and Worst of 2000 Awards.

In a feature on the history of Star Wars games, IGN's Rus McLaughlin called Force Commander "a blocky, buggy, undiluted failure". A similar article in GMR Magazine from March 2004 listed Force Commander as the worst Star Wars game. In the book Rogue Leaders: The Story of LucasArts, author Rob Smith said the "dated-looking visuals and clumsy controls turned off strategy gamers". Hollywood.com placed it fifth in a list of worst Star Wars video games. The staff said that Force Commander had "an unwieldy camera and uninspired combat". Rock Paper Shotgun's Alec Meer was also highly critical of the game. "I didn't make it past the first few levels. It was miserable."

In PC Gamer's article on the history of Star Wars games on PC, author Chris Thursten called the game "ambitious but rough around the edges". Craig Majaski of Gaming Age praised the game's easy learning curve, visuals and music. He praised the 3D presentation and said the models were "excellent", but noted that the camera often was difficult to control. Michael Lafferty of GameZone said that, while enjoyable, Force Commander did not provide as much depth as other real-time strategy games, specifically mentioning the Command & Conquer series. A CNET reviewer said that the game requires genre novices to frequently reference the documentation, but noted that "Star Wars fans and intermediate-level gamers who like third-person views" would enjoy the game. Soren Johnson, then a programmer at Maxis, berated the game's "infamously difficult" camera.
