= Underground to Palestine =

Book by I. F. Stone

- Author: I. F. Stone
- Publisher: Boni & Gaer
- Publication date: 1946

Underground to Palestine is a 1946 book by American journalist I. F. Stone chronicling some of the hundreds of thousands of Holocaust survivors attempting to reach Mandatory Palestine from post-WWII displaced persons camps.

Stone travels with the Haganah to Europe, where he joins a group of displaced persons (DPs) as they travel across the continent seeking a clandestine port of embarkation, joins an illegal convoy, runs the British blockade, and lands illegally in Mandatory Palestine.

Stone wrote that displaced persons made strenuous efforts to reach Palestine although it would have been far easier to emigrate to the United States because

They have been kicked around as Jews and now they want to live as Jews. Over and over I heard it said: ‘We want to build a Jewish country. ... We are tired of putting our sweat and blood into places where we are not welcome.' ... These Jews want the right to live as a people, to build as a people, to make their contribution to the world as a people. Are their national aspirations any less worthy of respect than those of any other oppressed people?

Writing in The Globe and Mail, journalist John R. MacArthur judges the book better than John Reed's Ten Days that Shook the World.

== Publishing history ==
The book first appeared as a series of articles published in PM, which won the Newspaper Guild of New York's Page One Award in 1947.

In 1978 the book was reprinted with the title Underground to Palestine and Reflections Thirty Years Later. It contained two extra chapters (Confessions of a Jewish Dissident and The Other Zionism) both of which had originally appeared as articles published in the New York Review of Books. Underground to Palestine at one point went out of print, possibly because of Stone's unpopular position favoring a binational Palestine.
