= Star Wars: Galactic Battlegrounds =

2001 video game

- Developers: LucasArts; Ensemble Studios; Westlake Interactive (Mac)
- Publishers: LucasArts; Aspyr (Mac)
- Designer: Garry M. Gaber
- Series: Star Wars
- Engine: Genie
- Platforms: Windows, Mac OS, Mac OS X
- Release: NA: November 13, 2001; EU: November 23, 2001; NA: June 5, 2002 (Mac)
- Genre: Real-time strategy
- Modes: Single-player, multiplayer

Star Wars: Galactic Battlegrounds is a real-time strategy video game set in the Star Wars universe. It was developed by LucasArts and Ensemble Studios. It was released in November 2001. An expansion pack, Clone Campaigns, was released on May 14, 2002, adding two new factions and campaigns. Later that year, both Galactic Battlegrounds and Clone Campaigns were released in a box set, Star Wars: Galactic Battlegrounds Saga.

The games were built on the Genie engine by Ensemble Studios, the same one used in Age of Empires and Age of Empires II.

== Gameplay ==
The player starts the game with a Command Center, a scout, and three workers (in a normal random map game) for whichever of the six original factions they choose. The player searches and gathers resources such as Food, Carbon, Nova Crystals, and Ore and then uses the resources in order to create new buildings, combat units, and workers. Food is used for low-end units and troopers, as well as the work force. Carbon is used in place of Wood in Age of Empires 2 for buildings and artillery. Nova Crystals create the more high-end units and can be gathered through getting special "holocrons" (similar to Relics in Age of Empires 2). Ore is used for defensive structures as well as the Gungan unique unit Fambaa. The player can build separate units at separate buildings designed specifically for different types of units. The player can advance through the four Tech Levels by paying a certain amount of resources. When a player advances a Tech Level, more units, buildings, and upgrades become available.

There are a total of seven military structures in the game. These are the Troop Center, the Shipyard, the Mech factory, the Jedi Temple or Sith Temple depending on the faction, the Heavy Weapons Factory, the Airbase, and the Fortress. The Troop center produces 'cannon fodder' early game units. These are the Grenadier, the Anti-Air trooper, the Mounted Trooper, and the ubiquitous Trooper. The Shipyard produces ships, these being the Frigate, the Destroyer, the Cruiser, and the Anti-Air Frigate. The Mech Factory produces Scouts, Assault Mechs, Strike Mechs, and Mech Destroyers. The Jedi Temple or Sith Temple is a depository for Holocrons and produces Jedi Padawans/Sith Apprentice and Jedi Knights/Sith Knights as well as Jedi Masters/Sith Masters. The Airbase produces aircraft such as fighters, bombers and transports, and the Heavy Weapons Factory produces pummels, artillery, anti-air mobiles, basically the big guns needed to mount a full-scale assault. The Fortress serves as a defensive structure and produces the civilization's unique unit and an anti-jedi Bounty Hunter, as well as long-range cannons, and the massive Air cruiser. It fires high-damage, area-of-effect shells at air, sea or ground targets over long reload times while being durable and having passive shielding. It is the most directly powerful unit in the game (not including cheats.)

If Victory is set to standard, the player can win in three different ways. The player may win by destroying all of the enemies buildings and units with their army. Also, the player can use a Jedi/Sith to bring all of the Holocrons to the Jedi/Sith Temple and preserve them for 200 "days". The final way to win is to build a monument that is only available at Tech Level 4. If the monument stays standing for 300 days, then the player wins.

=== Campaigns ===
- Tutorial - The campaign sees the player assume the role of Chewbacca's father, Attichitchuk. In this campaign, the player gradually learns the game's play mechanics as Attichitchuk marshals a Wookiee army to force the Trade Federation off Alaris Prime.
- Trade Federation - The campaign has the player assume the role of OOM-9, a droid ground commander leading the Trade Federation's actions during the blockade of Naboo in Star Wars: Episode I – The Phantom Menace which includes a conquest of Theed city, the capital of Naboo. The campaign also features the movie's ground battle between the Trade Federation and the Gungans but as an alternate history simulation wherein Darth Maul has killed Qui-Gon Jinn and Obi-Wan Kenobi while Federation droid ships destroy the Naboo starfighters.
- Gungans - The Gungan campaign begins millennia in the past as a sub-faction of Gungans under the command of Boss Gallo try to unite the other warring tribes under a single banner, then continues as the Gungans fight back against the Trade Federation invasion. It also features a bonus mission featuring The Phantom Menace's climactic ground battle, and the Naboo's assault against Trade Federation forces in Theed.
- Galactic Empire - The Imperial campaign begins just after the events of A New Hope, as Darth Vader personally leads the assault on the Rebels' Massassi Ruins base and captures General Jan Dodonna. The rest of the campaign focuses on suppressing other Rebel bases, including a mission to protect an AT-AT prototype, with a cameo by The Empire Strikes Back character General Veers (a colonel in the mission). The campaign's last mission is the Imperial attack on Hoth, where the player has a chance to destroy Echo Base and prevent Han Solo and company's escape. The bonus missions depict the Empire's hostile takeover of Bespin and an alternate retelling of the Battle of Endor where the Empire routs the Ewoks.
- Rebel Alliance - The Rebel campaign is mostly set between the events of A New Hope and The Empire Strikes Back. It features the Rebels' efforts to recover a Jedi artifact, the Vor'Na'Tu, while fending off Imperial forces. The bonus missions include the Battle of Hoth, the ground phase of the Battle of Endor, and a mission to attack an Imperial asteroid base.
- Wookiee - The mission features Chewbacca's efforts to liberate Kashyyyk from Trandoshan slavers and the Empire. Its bonus mission is the liberation of Kessel.

== Star Wars: Galactic Battlegrounds: Clone Campaigns ==
Clone Campaigns cover art

Star Wars: Galactic Battlegrounds Clone Campaigns is an expansion pack that was released two days before the theatrical release of Star Wars: Episode II – Attack of the Clones on May 14, 2002. It introduced two playable factions and campaigns: that of the Confederacy of Independent Systems and the Galactic Republic. Clone Campaigns added more units, such as the Decimator and the Air Cruiser, support for movable power supplies, and more. Clone Campaigns occurs during the first months of the Clone Wars.

=== Confederacy campaign ===
In the Confederacy campaign, the hero is Chiss warrior Sev'rance Tann, and guided by Count Dooku. The player's goal is to capture the energy-mining platforms of the Galactic Republic so that they can effectively hold Coruscant hostage, and take control of the Decimators, a secret weapon developed by the Republic.

The campaign begins with the Battle of Geonosis as Tann's forces clear an escape route for Count Dooku. After rebuilding the Separatist army, Count Dooku directs her to Tatooine, where she finds Boorka the Hutt. In exchange for destroying a Republic outpost, she is given information regarding the location of a Decimator testing base on Eredenn Prime. General Tann manages to capture the base and the Decimators, but their Wookiee manufacturers include a fail-safe locking code and prevent the CIS from using them. However, Tann manages to also capture a Data Droid, which she takes with her to the Wookiee colony on Alaris Prime. Alaris Prime soon serves as one of many probing attacks by the CIS on Wookiee territory before the Battle of Kashyyyk. After destroying the Wookiee Decimator facilities, Tann makes the droid unlock the Decimators. At this point the objective is revealed: Sarapin, a world providing much of the Republic's power. The Decimators' firepower enables Tann to crush the Republic defenses and kill the base's commander, Jedi Knight Jor Drakas.

=== Republic campaign ===
The Galactic Republic campaign begins at the Battle of Geonosis. Jedi Master Echuu Shen-Jon leads a force of clone troopers and Jedi including his young Padawan, Stam Reath, in destroying Trade Federation core ships. The mission is successful, but Reath is brutally killed by Sev'rance Tann, sinking Echuu into depression. The campaign follows the climax of the CIS campaign. The Jedi Council sends Shen-Jon to the planet along with his new padawan, Stam Reath's sister Naat, to reactivate Sarapin's energy platforms. The wreckage of a Decimator found on the planet reveals the usage of stolen Republic technology. The Republic forces successfully take back Sarapin and Shen-Jon interrogates CIS officer Zian Finnis, who gives away the Confederacy's presence on Tatooine.

Shen-Jon goes to Tatooine and strikes an alliance with Jabba the Hutt, who tips him off about the CIS' alliance with Boorka the Hutt (a rival in the planet's criminal industry). After defeating a band of Tusken Raiders and the combined Confederate and mercenary forces, Echuu discovers some supply crates destined for the distant world of Krant. Shen-Jon and Reath head to the planet and destroy a Trade Federation mining camp on Krant's moon, creating a staging area for the invasion of Krant. Wookiee stragglers assist the Republic forces in destroying the CIS Decimator factories, but Tann catches Reath and challenges Shen-Jon to a duel. The Jedi Master kills the Chiss commander, but his brush with the Dark Side of the Force leaves him with enough guilt to go on a self-imposed exile. Echuu later meets with Princess Leia on Krant during the Rebel campaign, where Darth Vader kills him.

The last mission follows the Rebel Alliance in their conquest of Coruscant's Imperial Palace, a few years following the Battle of Endor.

== Development ==
Star Wars: Galactic Battlegrounds was developed by both LucasArts and Ensemble Studios, using the latter's proprietary Genie game engine. The game, as well as the Clone Campaigns expansion pack, was designed and directed by Garry M. Gaber.

== Reception ==
=== Star Wars: Galactic Battlegrounds ===
Galactic Battlegrounds

Aggregate scores
Aggregator	Score
GameRankings	77.33%
Metacritic	75/100

Review scores
Publication	Score
AllGame	3/5
Game Informer	3.75/10
GameRevolution	C
GameSpot	8.2/10
GameSpy	77%
GameZone	9/10
IGN	8/10
Next Generation	4/5
PC Gamer (US)	78%
X-Play	3/5
FHM	4/5

In the United States, Galactic Battlegrounds sold 225,000 copies and earned $9.8 million by August 2006, after its release in November 2001. It was the country's 94th best-selling computer game during this period. Combined sales of all versions and expansions of Galactic Battlegrounds reached 480,000 units in the United States by August 2006.

Star Wars: Galactic Battlegrounds received generally positive reviews. GameRankings gave the game a score of 77.33%, while Metacritic gave it 75 out of 100. GameSpot gave the game an 8.2/10, calling it "perfect for a generation of gamers raised on Star Wars". However, Brian Gee of Game Revolution gave the game a "C" and said that it "doesn't feel very Star Wars".

Carla Harker reviewed the PC version of the game for Next Generation, rating it four stars out of five, and stated that "Age of Empires and Star Wars? Bring it on."

=== Clone Campaigns ===
Galactic Battlegrounds: Clone Campaigns

Aggregate scores
Aggregator	Score
GameRankings	73.78%
Metacritic	71/100

Review scores
Publication	Score
AllGame	3/5
GameSpot	6.4/10
GameSpy	82%
GameZone	8.5/10
IGN	7.8/10
PC Gamer (US)	70%
Entertainment Weekly	B+

The Clone Campaigns expansion pack was met with positive to average reception; GameRankings gave it a score of 73.78% while Metacritic gave it 71 out of 100.
