= Immune Attack =

- Developer(s): Federation of American Scientists, Escape Hatch Entertainment
- Publisher(s): Federation of American Scientists
- Designer(s): Escape Hatch Entertainment, University of Southern California, Brown University
- Engine: Vicious Cycle Development Environment
- Platform(s): PC
- Release: May 23, 2008
- Genre(s): Educational, Scientific Fiction
- Mode(s): Single player

Immune Attack is an educational video game created by the Federation of American Scientists and Escape Hatch Entertainment. Early development of the game was done by Brown University, in collaboration with the University of Southern California, under a grant from the National Science Foundation. The game is designed to teach immunology to high school students, although later versions will cater to college aged students as well.

The game was officially released in May 2008, and is freely available for download.

== Game summary ==
The protagonist of Immune Attack is a teenaged prodigy in the near-future with a unique immunodeficiency in which the immune system is "present, yet non-functional" - as if all the immune cells have forgotten what to do. The hero decides to take matters into her own hands, and allies herself with a team of scientists to create a nanobot with the abilities to teach cells how to fight bacterial and viral infections.

The player assumes the role of a pilot remote-controlling the nanobot Explorer. With the help of advisors, the player must learn about the different cells and environments in the human body in order to determine how to train the immune system. Visual and audio clues in the game provide the information needed to accomplish this goal.

Each subsequent level of Immune Attack features a different infection, and a different cell type the player must train. Cells trained on previous levels are available for deployment as well, allowing the user to make use of a wide range of agents to accomplish their mission.

Immune Attack was evaluated in 5th grade though 12th grade classrooms across the US from 2009 through 2013. A research paper was published in 2014 by Dr. Melanie Stegman, the Director of the Learning Technologies Program at the Federation of American Scientists (FAS). In 2014, Stegman was asked by FAS to take the Learning Technologies Program away from FAS, as FAS was interested in focusing on nuclear non proliferation and secrecy. Stegman started a company called Molecular Jig Games and is working on making commercial quality video games that continue to teach serious molecular cell biology. Melanie Stegman's research demonstrates that learning games can teach the terms and abstract concepts of molecular cell biology.

== In the news ==
- Hoppock, Julia (2008-06-13). "Are Video Games the New Textbooks?". ABC News.
- Timothy, Lord (2008-06-29). "A Video Game To Teach AP Level Immunology". Slashdot.org.
