= Federation of American Scientists =

American think tank, founded 1946

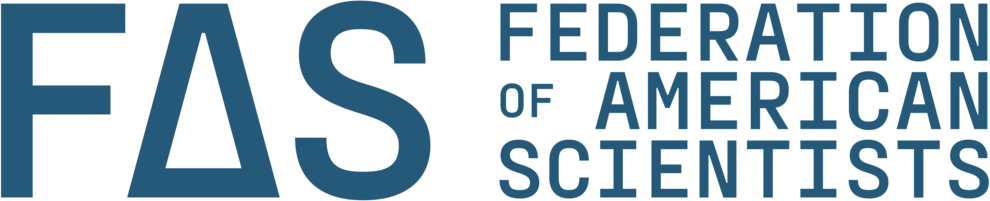
- Abbreviation: FAS
- Predecessor: Federation of Atomic Scientists
- Formation: January 6, 1946; 80 years ago
- Type: 501(c)(3) organization
- Tax ID no.: 23-7185827
- Headquarters: 1112 16th Street NW; Suite 400; Washington, D.C.
- President: Dan Correa
- Chair: Gilman Louie
- Vice Chair: Rosina M. Bierbaum
- Secretary/Treasurer: Nishal Mohan
- Board of directors: Sylvester James Gates; Theresa S. Mayer; Allison Scott; Jan Lodal; Catherine Lotrionte; Don Lebell; Daniel M. Gerstein; Robert M. Solow (Ex Officio); Frank N. von Hippel (Ex Officio)
- Revenue: US$1,486,251 (2017)
- Expenses: US$1,441,697 (2017)
- Endowment: US$629,988 (2017)
- Website: www.fas.org
- The Federation of American Scientists (FAS), a policy research and advocacy organization, seeks to promote national and global security by advancing solutions to important science and technology security problems.

The Federation of American Scientists (FAS) is an American nonprofit policy think tank with the stated intent of using science and scientific analysis to make the world more secure. FAS was founded in 1945 by a group of scientists, some of whom had previously contributed to the development of nuclear weapons in the Manhattan Project. The Federation of American Scientists states that it aims to reduce the amount of nuclear weapons that are in use, and prevent nuclear and radiological terrorism. It says it aims to present high standards for nuclear energy's safety and security, illuminate government secrecy practices, as well as track and eliminate the global illicit trade of conventional, nuclear, biological and chemical weapons.

With 100 sponsors, the Federation of American Scientists says that it promotes a safer and more secure world by developing and advancing solutions to important science and technology security policy problems by educating the public and policy makers, and promoting transparency through research and analysis to maximize impact on policy. FAS projects are organized in three main programs: nuclear security, government secrecy, and biosecurity. FAS has played a role in the control of atomic energy and weapons, as well as better international monitoring of atomic activities.

== History ==
FAS was founded as the Federation of Atomic Scientists on November 30, 1945, by a group of scientists and engineers associated with the Manhattan Project, including personnel from the Oak Ridge and Los Alamos sites. Among the founding members were David Hawkins, Melba Phillips, and Robert R. Wilson.

Its early mission was to support the McMahon Act of 1946, educate the public, press, politicians, and policy-makers, and promote international transparency and nuclear disarmament. The group was frustrated with the control of the nation's nuclear arsenal and advocated for public control of the nuclear arsenal. A group of the early members of the Federation of American Scientists went to Washington, D.C., and set up there sending letters to representatives in the House of Representatives and in the Senate to request support for their original goal not to support the May-Johnson Bill. The group of scientists were opposed to the fact that, under the proposed May-Johnson Bill, the United States military would have the majority of control over the development and control of atomic weapons. Working with congressmen, they worked to create the bill that brought forth the Atomic Energy Commission (AEC). The Atomic Energy Commission oversaw the research into atomic energy and atomic weapons. On January 6, 1946, FAS changed its name to the Federation of American Scientists, but its purpose remained the same—to agitate for the international control of atomic energy and its devotion to peaceful uses, public promotion of science and the freedom and integrity of scientists and scientific research. For this purpose, permanent headquarters were set up in Washington, D.C., and contacts were established with the several branches of government, the United Nations, professional and private organizations, and influential persons. The explosion of postwar political activism demonstrated by the group became known as the "scientists' movement" with the basis of being unhappy with the United States' monopoly on nuclear weapons. During this movement, the idea was also established that no defense against an atomic bomb was feasible in the near future. Using these two ideas, the FAS proposed the United States and other technologically advanced nations had to work in unison to create a solution that would not end in complete destruction.

In 1946, the FAS worked with the Ad Council to broadcast a list of facts regarding the state of the United Nations atomic energy negotiations as well as the American proposal for atomic development. In a rare example of an effort to simply give listeners facts with little to no political or personal bias, the scientists at FAS were able to broadcast this information to the public in hopes of informing the public to be "armed with the facts — instead of swayed by emotions or prejudices." Throughout the course of trying to give the public information, the FAS attempted to coordinate with PR agencies to better connect with the audience. Most of these plans fell through as the agencies typically did not see eye-to-eye with members of the FAS. Scientists realized the importance of getting their point across, but conveying that to someone who had little to no background knowledge on the subject of atomic energy proved to be a challenge, a challenge that would stick with the FAS for many years. Many scientists from more localized organizations had comments like "We have failed. The people have not understood us or our foreign policy would have changed."

By 1948, the Federation had grown to twenty local associations, with 2,500 members, and had been instrumental in the passage of the McMahon Act and the National Science Foundation, and had influenced the American position in the United Nations with regard to international control of atomic energy and disarmament.

In addition to influencing government policy, it undertook a program of public education on the nature and control of atomic energy through lectures, films, exhibits, and the distribution of literature, coordinating its own activities with that of member organizations through the issue of memorandum, policy statements, information sheets, and newsletters.

Nearly ninety percent of Manhattan Project personnel were in approval of the FAS, with few comparing the group to a "scientists' lobby."

=== Mission ===
The mission of FAS is to promote a safer and more secure world by developing and advancing solutions to important science and technology security policy problems by educating the public and policy makers, and promoting transparency through research and analysis to maximize impact on policy. This mission was established early on and was deemed necessary for the federation, as decisions made by the United States during the conception of the FAS were critical in terms of shaping international relations. The FAS wanted the public to become more critical and aware of the government, in order to monitor the decisions that were made to ensure that they matched what the public actually wanted. The FAS would act to inform the public about how destructive the improper use of atomic energy could be and emphasize the need to enforce international control of atomic weapons and energy.

=== Membership ===
In July 2026 FAS ratified their first collective bargaining agreement with IAM Union District 4.

Membership History

In 1969, the FAS had a rough annual budget of $7,000 and relied on mostly volunteer staff. In 1970 Jeremy J. Stone was selected as president of the organization and was the only staff member for the next 5 years. Due to Stone being the president and only member of the organization he influenced the future and direction of the organization heavily. With an increased budget in the 1990s FAS was able to employ a staff of about a dozen people and expand membership of the organization.

In the mid-1980s, the FAS began relying more heavily on professional staff and analysts, and journalists rather than famous scientists as it did previously in its history. The organization shifted toward public information and transparency in the government and away from secrecy in covert projects and finances. In 2000 Henry C. Kelly, a former senior scientist in the Office of Technology Assessment and science policy adviser in the Clinton administration, became the new president. He further pursued the goals of the program of bolstering science in policy and focusing on using that science to further benefit the public. During his eight-year tenure as president, FAS received significant funding from the John D. and Catherine T. MacArthur Foundation, including a $2.5 million grant for Creative and Effective Institutions.

In a 2002 survey conducted within the FAS, it was found that nearly thirty percent of members were physicists. While the next largest fields represented were medicine, biology, engineering, and chemistry. With the latter four fields making up another sixty one percent of the total member population. Members also received complementary copies of "Secrecy News", an electronic newsletter regarding government secrecy and intelligence.

=== Funding from the MacArthur Foundation ===
Federation of American Scientists was awarded $10,586,000 between 1984 and 2017, including 25 grants in International Peace & Security, MacArthur Award for Creative & Effective Institutions, and Nuclear Challenges. In 2004, the Federation of American Scientists received their largest grant from the MacArthur Foundation of $2,400,000 in support of everything that they do.

=== Leadership history ===
- Jeremy Stone, CEO, 1970–2000
- Henry C. Kelly, President, 2000-
- Charles Ferguson, President, 2010–2017

=== Board members ===
Joel Primack, board member, lead FAS's 1988 effort to end the Soviet Union's nuclear reactor-powered satellite program

== Programs and projects ==
=== Nuclear Information Project ===
The Nuclear Information Project covers nuclear weapons and arms control and the nuclear fuel cycle. The project provides the general public and policy-makers with information and analysis on the status, number, and operation of nuclear weapons, the policies that guide their potential use and nuclear arms control. The project is run by Hans M. Kristensen.

The Nuclear Information Project publishes yearly counts of global nuclear forces in the Bulletin of the Atomic Scientists' "Nuclear Notebook" column. The Nuclear Notebook counts and analyzes international nuclear arsenals using open source research methodology. The estimates in the Nuclear Notebook often accurately count warhead inventories, down to the number, and, according to the Bulletin of the Atomic Scientists, represent an "authoritative accounting of global nuclear warheads compiled by top experts".

The Nuclear Information Project conducts other open source investigations into nuclear weapons outside of the Nuclear Notebook. In addition to publishing on the Strategic Security blog, fellows also publish in Forbes.

=== Day One Project and Policy Entrepreneurship ===
FAS's "Day One Project" crowdsources "science-based policy innovations that can appeal to lawmakers on both sides of the aisle" ready for implementation on "day one" of the next U.S. presidential administration, a project begun in 2019.

== Legacy programs and projects ==
=== Project on Government Secrecy ===
"From 1991 to 2021, the FAS Project on Government Secrecy worked to challenge excessive government secrecy and to promote public oversight in national security affairs"..."The Project was directed by Steven Aftergood with the support of grants from the Open Society Foundations, the CS Fund, the Bauman Foundation, the Stewart R. Mott Foundation, the Knight Foundation, the HKH Foundation, the Rockefeller Family Fund, and others."

The Project on Government Secrecy worked to promote public access to government information and to illuminate the apparatus of government secrecy, including national security classification and declassification policies. The project also published previously undisclosed or hard-to-find government documents of public policy interest, as well as resources on intelligence policy.

Declassified documents, as well as Congressional Research Service reports, are archived on the Secrecy News blog.

=== Biosecurity Program ===
A molecular biologist, Dr. Hatch Rosenberg was a founder of the Federation of American Scientists' Working Group on Biological and Chemical Weapons and a former adviser to the Clinton White House when the anthrax scare startled an America that had recently been wounded by the attacks of Sept. 11, 2001.

The Biosecurity Program concentrates on researching and advocating policies that balance science and security without compromising national security or scientific progress. This includes preventing the misuse of research and promoting the public understanding of the real threats from biological and chemical weapons. The Federation of American Scientists also concentrates on researching and keeping the public informed on genetic engineering and genetic modification as a subset of their biosecurity program. One of their major concerns is resistance that species can develop to certain modifications from genetic resistance or from the use of antibiotics.

The big concerns with biosecurity are accidental biological threats, intentional malicious biological threats, and natural biological threat occurrences. Because of these threats the Virtual Biosecurity Center (VBC) was set up.

The Virtual Biosecurity Center provides and promotes biosecurity information, education, best practices and collaboration. Additionally, VBC offers significant news and events regarding biosecurity, a regularly updated education center and library, a global forum on Bio risks, an online informative policy tool, empowering partnerships among other professional biosecurity communities around the world, scheduled global conferences to raise awareness and develop plans for current and future biosecurity issues, as well as partnerships to tighten the gap between the scientific, public health, intelligence and law enforcement communities.

=== Learning Technologies Program ===
The Learning Technologies Program (LTP) focused on ways to use innovative technologies to improve how people teach and learn. The LTP created prototype games and learning tools and assembled collaborative projects consisting of non-governmental organization, design professionals, and community leaders to undertake innovative education initiatives at both the national and local level.

The Project worked to help create learning tools to bring about major gains in learning and training. The major project of the Program is Immune Attack, a fully 3-D game in which high school students discover the inner workings of the body's circulatory and immune systems, as they pilot a tiny drone through the bloodstream to fight microscopic invaders.

== FAS Public Service Awards ==
The FAS Public Service Awards, established in 1971, recognize outstanding work in science policy and culture.

=== Winners ===
==== 2023 ====
- Alondra Nelson — Former acting director of the Office of Science and Technology Policy, whose recognized for her leadership in A.I. regulation and advancing equity in STEM fields
- Christopher Nolan — British-American filmmaker, whose biographical thriller film Oppenheimer (2023) depicted the scientists who formed the FAS to communicate the dangers of nuclear weapons to the public
- Chuck Schumer (D-NY) and Todd Young (R-IN) — United States senators who sponsored the CHIPS and Science Act, which was hailed by the FAS as representing a "historic investment" in the American future
- Alexa White — Co-founder of the AYA Research Institute and recipient of the FAS' inaugural Policy Entrepreneurship Award, aimed at honoring an emerging leader in the world of science policy

== See also ==
- British American Security Information Council
- Union of Concerned Scientists
