= Private Attorneys General Act =

California statute

Private Attorneys General Act (PAGA)
- State Seal of California

California State Legislature, 2003–2004 Regular Session
- Long title: Labor Code Private Attorneys General Act of 2004
- Citation: Cal. Lab. Code § 2698 et seq.
- Passed: Assembly: September 11, 2003 Senate: September 12, 2003
- Signed: October 12, 2003
- Effective: January 1, 2004

Legislative history
- Bill title: An act to add Part 13 (commencing with Section 2698) to Division 2 of the Labor Code, relating to employment.
- Bill citation: S. 796, 2003-2004 Leg., Reg. Sess. (Cal. 2003)

Amended by
- S. 1809, 2003-2004 Leg., Reg. Sess. (Cal. 2004)
- Status: In force

The Private Attorneys General Act of 2004 (PAGA) is a California statute that authorizes aggrieved employees to bring actions for civil penalties on behalf of themselves, other employees, and the State of California against their employers for California Labor Code violations. PAGA's purpose is not to recover damages or receive restitution, but rather to allow citizens to act as private attorneys general and enforce the Labor Code. Because PAGA suits are fundamentally law enforcement actions, aggrieved employees must notify the Labor and Workforce Development Agency (LWDA)—the state agency that enforces California labor laws—of any alleged Labor Code violations. An aggrieved employee can only file a PAGA lawsuit after the LWDA elects not to pursue its own action against the employer.

PAGA was enacted pursuant to Senate Bill 796 (SB 796) in 2003, and it went into effect on January 1, 2004. In enacting PAGA, the California Legislature declared that staffing levels for state labor law enforcement had declined over the last decade, and were unlikely to keep pace with the growth of the labor market. The Legislature determined that it was in the public interest to provide that aggrieved employees can act as private attorneys general and collect civil penalties for Labor Code violations.

PAGA lawsuits have increased significantly since the statute's enactment, with filings rising by more than 400 percent in its first decade alone. While intended to augment the enforcement capabilities of state labor agencies, the act has frequently been criticized as a vehicle for abusive and vexatious litigation. In response to these concerns, the California Legislature enacted comprehensive reforms in 2024 designed to limit the scope of recoverable penalties and provide "cure" provisions for employers acting in good faith. These efforts were further expanded by proposed 2026 legislative amendments aimed at refining the definition of an "aggrieved employee" and establishing stricter evidentiary thresholds. These successive waves of reform reflect an ongoing effort by the state to balance the protection of labor rights with the need to curb the proliferation of predatory litigation.

== Overview ==
PAGA authorizes employees to recover two separate types of civil penalties. The first type is penalties for violating Labor Code sections that themselves provide for civil penalties. The second type is penalties for violating Labor Code sections that do not themselves specify penalties for their violation. For this second type of penalty, PAGA mandates that an employer's initial Labor Code violation incurs a civil penalty of $100 per aggrieved employee per pay period, and each subsequent violation incurs a civil penalty of $200 per employee per pay period. 65 percent of civil penalties recovered in a PAGA suit go to the LWDA, and the remaining 35 percent go to the "aggrieved employees" affected. For PAGA claims filed on or before June 19, 2024, the respective allocation for penalties is 75 percent and 25 percent. Successful PAGA claimants can also recover attorneys' fees.

Before employees can initiate a lawsuit through PAGA, they must first provide written notice of their claims to the LWDA and pay a filing fee. Within 65 days, the LWDA may opt to investigate the alleged violations itself. If the employees receive notice that the LWDA does not intend to investigate, or if the employees do not receive any notice from the LWDA within 65 days, then the employees may initiate their own PAGA lawsuit. For certain violations specified in the statute, the employer has a 33-day window to cure the violation and avoid an enforcement action.

== History and background ==
Before PAGA's enactment, the LWDA was authorized to collect civil penalties for Labor Code violations where specified. The state's Attorney General and other public prosecutors could also pursue misdemeanor charges against violators of specified provisions of the Labor Code. Additionally, for specified Labor Code sections, an employee could file a claim with the Labor Commissioner alleging a violation, and sue the employer directly for damages, reinstatement, and other relief if the Commissioner declined to bring an action. Individual employees could also sue to enjoin unlawful business acts under the Unfair Competition Law, Section 17200 of the Business and Professions Code.

In 2001, the Assembly Committee on Labor and Employment held hearings to evaluate the effectiveness of enforcement of wage and hour laws by the Department of Industrial Relations (DIR), a subdivision of the LWDA. Despite the DIR being the largest state labor law enforcement organization in the country, evidence received by the Committee indicated that public resources were not keeping pace with the rapidly growing state economy. Between 1980 and 2000, California's workforce grew by 48 percent, while the budget for California's Division of Labor Standards Enforcement (DLSE) increased only 27 percent. The budget for California's Division of Occupational Safety and Health (Cal/OSHA) decreased by 14 percent over the same period. Furthermore, DLSE and Cal/OSHA staffing levels had decreased over the past two decades.

Under these conditions, evidence indicated that the DIR was failing to effectively enforce labor laws. The size of California's "underground economy"—businesses operating outside the state's tax and licensing requirements—was estimated to be 60 to 140 billion dollars annually, generating a tax loss to the state of three to six billion dollars per year. Additionally, a study by the U.S. Department of Labor estimated the existence of over 33,000 serious and ongoing wage violations in Los Angeles's garment industry, which employed over 100,000 workers, but the DIR was issuing fewer than 100 wage citations per year for all industries throughout the state. Furthermore, many Labor Code provisions were punishable only by criminal misdemeanor, but violations were rarely addressed because district attorneys tended to direct their resources to violent crimes and other public priorities.

Facing low staffing levels for labor law enforcement, an increasing labor force, and a statewide budget deficit, the California Legislature proposed Senate Bill 796 (SB 796), referred to as the Labor Code Private Attorneys General Act of 2004 (PAGA). The Legislature proposed SB 796 to allow aggrieved employees to act as private attorneys general and collect civil penalties from employers that violate the Labor Code.

SB 796's supporters, including its cosponsors the California Labor Federation and the California Rural Legal Assistance Foundation, asserted that inadequate staffing in labor law enforcement and growth of the underground economy, combined with the state's severe budgetary shortfall, called for a creative solution to effectively crack down on labor law violations. The bill was opposed by business associations like the California Chamber of Commerce, which thought that the bill would encourage private attorneys to "act as vigilantes" and pressure small businesses into settlements over minor infractions. Opponents also argued that the bill's lack of attorneys' fees for prevailing employers, lack of requirements for administrative exhaustion, and lack of prosecutorial discretion would invite aggressive litigation and overburden employers.

On September 11, 2003, the California State Assembly passed SB 796 by a margin of one vote above the minimum required to pass a regular bill. The California State Senate passed the bill by the minimum number of votes necessary. Governor Gray Davis signed the bill on October 12, 2003, and the bill took effect on January 1, 2004.

== Legislative amendments ==
=== SB 1809 (2004) ===
As soon as PAGA was enacted, opponents tried unsuccessfully to repeal the statute. Shortly after PAGA's enactment, the Legislature altered PAGA's provisions by passing Senate Bill 1809 (SB 1809), which was signed into law on August 11, 2004, by California Gov. Arnold Schwarzenegger. Introduced after an agreement between the state, businesses, and labor representatives, SB 1809 aimed to provide employers an opportunity to cure less serious labor law violations and avoid "shakedown lawsuits."

SB 1809 first requires aggrieved employees to follow certain administrative procedures prior to filing a PAGA action, including providing written notice to the LWDA and the employer. SB 1809 added PAGA's requirements that aggrieved employees can only file a private action if the LWDA declines to pursue its own action, and the employer is provided the opportunity to cure specified Labor Code violations. SB 1809 also: (1) affords courts the ability to award less than the maximum civil penalty amount specified by the statute; (2) requires courts to review and authorize any settlement agreement of PAGA claims; and (3) eliminates PAGA recovery based on an employer's violation of most posting and notice requirements in the Labor Code.

=== Recent PAGA reforms ===
Assembly Bill 1506 (AB 1506), which passed in 2015, provides employers an opportunity to cure a failure to include the period of performance and the employer's name and address in a wage statement before aggrieved employees are entitled to bring a PAGA suit. Proponents of the bill, noting a severe increase in PAGA lawsuits from 2005 to 2013, argued that this bill would allow employers to cure often unintentional errors without the threat of a costly lawsuit.

In 2016, Governor Jerry Brown's budget proposal indicated that less than one percent of PAGA cases were being reviewed or investigated by the LWDA due to a lack of resources. To increase the LWDA's role in enforcing labor law violations, the Legislature passed Senate Bill 836 (SB 836) in 2016. SB 836 requires online filing of all items submitted to the LWDA, as well as a $75 filing fee for new case notices. The bill also requires that all proposed settlements and court judgments are submitted to the LWDA. Finally, the bill extends the time that the LWDA can review new cases and notify parties of its intent to investigate violations.

The Legislature has also passed special industry-specific PAGA provisions. In 2018, the Legislature passed Assembly Bill 1654 (AB 1654), which excepts from PAGA employees in the construction industry with respect to work performed under a collective bargaining agreement that meets specific statutory requirements. Senate Bill 646 (SB 646), passed in 2021, similarly excepts employees in the janitorial industry if there is a collective bargaining agreement that meets specific statutory requirements.

== Court interpretation ==
=== Expansion of PAGA's reach ===
Since PAGA's enactment, several California court decisions have protected employees' rights to maintain PAGA lawsuits.

In Arias v. Superior Court (2009), the California Supreme Court expanded PAGA's scope by holding that a plaintiff can raise a representative PAGA action without satisfying the heightened standards required for a typical class action. In this case, an employee brought a PAGA claim on behalf of himself and other employees against his employer for several Labor Code violations. The lower California court of appeal determined that to bring a PAGA representative action, a plaintiff need not satisfy class action requirements. The California Supreme Court affirmed, holding that failing to impose class action requirements on PAGA actions was not contrary to legislative intent, nor would it violate defendants' right to due process.

In Huff v. Securitas Security Services USA, Inc. (2018), California's Sixth District Court of Appeal held that employees who suffer from one Labor Code violation can seek PAGA penalties for other Labor Code violations that did not affect them personally. The court reasoned that because PAGA's purpose is to achieve maximum compliance with labor laws and address the problem of inadequate state enforcement, limiting PAGA plaintiffs from seeking penalties for all violations would be contrary to legislative intent.

In Kim v. Reins International California, Inc. (2020), the California Supreme Court concluded that an employee who settled his individual wage and hour claims retained standing to maintain a PAGA action. The court determined that PAGA's language mandates only two requirements for standing: (1) that the plaintiff was an "aggrieved employee" who worked for the alleged violator; and (2) that the employer committed one or more of the alleged violations against the plaintiff. Because the plaintiff still satisfied those two requirements, he maintained PAGA standing.

In Johnson v. Maxim Healthcare Services, Inc. (2021), California's Fourth District Court of Appeal held that an employee with a time-barred individual claim could still pursue a representative PAGA action. Citing the California Supreme Court's reasoning in Kim regarding PAGA's standing requirements, the court determined that "[t]he fact that Johnson's individual claim may be time-barred does not nullify the alleged Labor Code violations nor strip Johnson of her standing to pursue PAGA remedies."

Several federal courts have disagreed with California courts' expansive reading of PAGA. For instance, in Magadia v. Wal-Mart Associates, Inc. (2021), the U.S. Court of Appeals for the Ninth Circuit departed from Huff's ruling, holding that an employee lacked standing to bring a PAGA claim in federal court for a Labor Code violation that he did not personally experience. Additionally, in Medlock v. Taco Bell Corp. (2014), the U.S. District Court for the Eastern District of California disagreed with the California Supreme Court's finding in Arias, holding instead that a representative PAGA action needed to meet requirements for class certification.

=== Manageability of PAGA claims ===
California appellate courts are currently split on the issue of whether courts can strike PAGA claims based on manageability. In Wesson v. Staples the Office Superstore, LLC (2021), California's Second District Court of Appeal held that "courts have inherent authority to ensure that PAGA claims can be fairly and efficiently tried and, if necessary, may strike claims that cannot be rendered manageable." The court reasoned that PAGA actions may involve similar or greater manageability concerns compared to other representative claims, since PAGA actions can cover a vast number of employees with different experiences related to the alleged violations.

California's Fourth District Court of Appeal came to the opposite conclusion in Estrada v. Royalty Carpet Mills, Inc. (2022), holding that a court cannot strike a PAGA claim based on manageability. The court determined that permitting a court to dismiss a PAGA action due to manageability would place an extra hurdle on PAGA claimants and graft a class action requirement onto PAGA actions, which undermines PAGA's purpose as a law enforcement mechanism. The California Supreme Court granted the Estrada defendant's petition for review on June 22, 2022, to determine whether trial courts have inherent authority to strike PAGA claims that they consider unmanageable.

=== Waiver of right to bring a PAGA action ===
Employers in California are generally able to require employees to sign arbitration agreements that preclude employees from bringing class action lawsuits or arbitrations. In Iskanian v. CLS Transportation Los Angeles, LLC (2014), the California Supreme Court concluded that arbitration agreements requiring an employee to waive the right to bring a representative PAGA action are unenforceable. The plaintiff in Iskanian, who had signed an arbitration agreement that waived his right to bring a class proceeding, sought to bring a representative action under PAGA. The court held that because PAGA actions are public enforcement actions, California public policy prohibits waiver of the right to bring a PAGA claim. The court further held that the Federal Arbitration Act (FAA), which provides for judicial facilitation of private disputes through arbitration, did not preempt the rule against PAGA waivers. The court reasoned that the FAA covers private disputes, and PAGA actions are disputes between an employer and the LWDA—a state agency.

Iskanian's holding was undermined by the United States Supreme Court's decision in Viking River Cruises, Inc. v. Moriana (2022). In Viking River Cruises, the plaintiff asserted a variety of Labor Code violations on behalf of herself and other employees. Because the plaintiff had signed an arbitration agreement and class action waiver, the defendant moved to compel arbitration of the plaintiff's individual PAGA claims—the violations that the plaintiff suffered herself—and it moved to dismiss the other representative PAGA claims. Justice Alito, writing for the Court, held that the FAA preempts the Iskanian rule prohibiting the division of PAGA actions into individual and representative claims through arbitration agreements. Under this ruling, the defendant was entitled to compel arbitration of the plaintiff's individual PAGA claims. Furthermore, because the plaintiff's individual claims were pared away from the action, she lacked standing to maintain her remaining representative claims. Under the Court's holding in Viking River Cruises, employers may now compel arbitration of a plaintiff's individual PAGA claims, which in turn may wipe out the plaintiff's ability to bring a representative action.

== Criticism and effort to repeal PAGA ==
Since its enactment, PAGA has been opposed by California business associations, who argue that the statute overburdens employers while failing to protect workers. For example, a 2021 report sponsored by the California Business and Industrial Alliance argued that while LWDA-decided cases provide higher awards to workers, employers pay higher penalties in PAGA cases litigated in court. Business associations have argued that this discrepancy is due to the attorneys' fees that plaintiffs' attorneys can recover in PAGA court cases.

In light of these criticisms, several California business associations are sponsoring a ballot initiative titled the California Fair Pay and Employer Accountability Act (FPEAA) that would repeal PAGA. FPEAA would eliminate employees' ability to file their own lawsuits to enforce the Labor Code, and would instead grant the Labor Commissioner sole authority to levy civil penalties for Labor Code violations. All penalties would be distributed to the aggrieved employees (as opposed to PAGA, which awards 25 percent of awarded penalties to aggrieved employees). FPEAA would also provide funding to the Labor Commissioner to ensure adequate enforcement, authorize increased penalties for willful violations, and require the Labor Commissioner to offer pre-enforcement consultation for employers.

FPEAA's drafters cite "backlogged courts" and exorbitant attorneys' fees as reasons to repeal PAGA, and contend that its new statutory scheme will provide employees with full penalties without having to file a lawsuit or hire an attorney. On the other hand, PAGA's proponents argue that PAGA has demonstratively improved Labor Code compliance, provided critical funding for labor law enforcement through civil penalties, and protected workers from wage theft. Additionally, FPEAA's critics maintain that removing PAGA's multi-plaintiff recoveries and attorneys' fees will result in employers violating the Labor Code without consequences.

On July 22, 2022, the California Secretary of State announced that FPEAA has qualified as an eligible ballot measure for the November 2024 General Election ballot.

=== 2024 PAGA amendments ===
The 2024 PAGA amendments in California, enacted via Assembly Bill (AB) 2288 and Senate Bill (SB) 92 and effective for notices filed on or after June 19, 2024, significantly modified the state's labor enforcement mechanism. A key change was the introduction of stricter standing requirements, mandating that a PAGA plaintiff must have "personally suffered each" specific Labor Code violation alleged in the representative action. Prior to this amendment in 2024, an aggrieved employee who suffered just one Labor Code violation had standing to sue for a wide array of other violations affecting fellow employees. The 2024 reforms also explicitly granted courts the authority to limit the scope of PAGA claims at trial, enhancing manageability.

The 2024 amendments also substantially revised the penalty structure, introducing reduced liability for employers who demonstrate good-faith compliance efforts. For employers who take "all reasonable steps" to comply before receiving a PAGA notice, penalties can be capped at 15% of the maximum amount, with different caps for remediation taken afterward. Conversely, a higher $200 penalty for "subsequent" violations is reserved for cases involving malicious, fraudulent, or oppressive conduct, or where a prior violation finding exists. To encourage early resolution, the reforms expand the range of Labor Code violations that employers may cure and establish a new process for an Early Evaluation Conference. Finally, the division of recovered penalties was adjusted to allocate 35% (up from 25%) to the aggrieved employees, with the remaining 65% (down from 75%) going to the Labor and Workforce Development Agency (LWDA).

=== 2026 Proposed additional amendments ===
In February 2026, the LWDA issued a Notice of Proposed Rulemaking, introducing further administrative controls specifically aimed at curbing predatory and template-driven litigation. Central to these 2026 proposals is the creation of a "high-frequency filer" framework, targeting attorneys or law firms that have filed 200 or more PAGA notices within a 12-month period. Under these rules, such filers would be required to submit a separate certification signed by the plaintiff, affirming that the claims have actual legal and evidentiary support and are not being submitted for an improper purpose. Furthermore, the 2026 regulations establish a formal "vexatious filer" designation; attorneys identified as such would be subject to pre-filing screening orders, effectively requiring the LWDA to verify the compliance and factual specificity of their notices before they can proceed. These measures, along with a mandate that notices provide specific "facts and theories" rather than boilerplate legal conclusions, represent a concerted effort to shift PAGA away from high-volume, "shakedown" tactics and back toward its original intent of meaningful labor law enforcement.
