= George G. Kidwell =

American labor leader and politician (1884–1948)

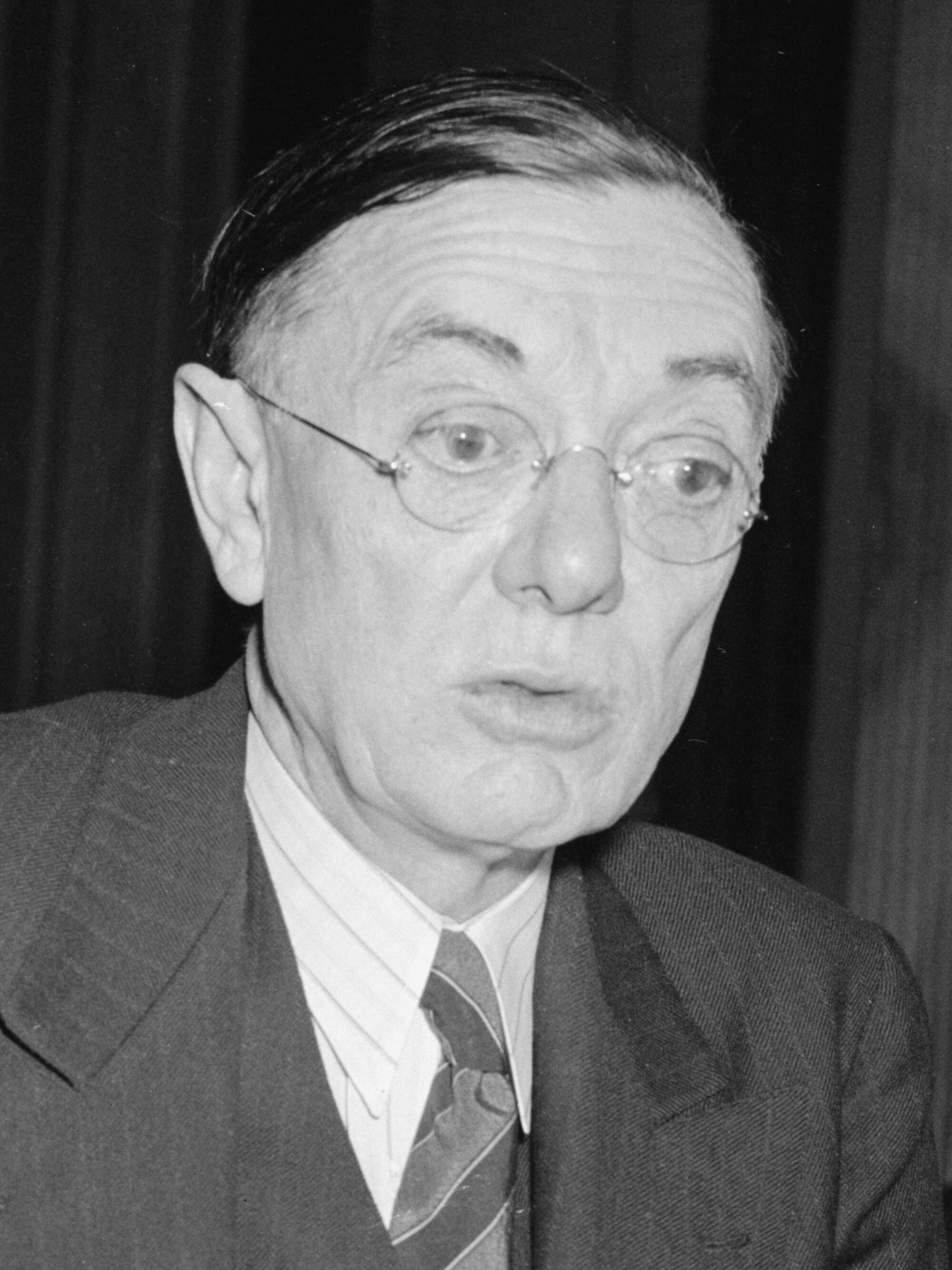
- Kidwell in 1939

Director of the California Department of Industrial Relations
- In office January 2, 1939 – January 4, 1943
- Appointed by: Culbert Olson
- Preceded by: Timothy A. Reardon
- Succeeded by: Paul Scharrenberg

Personal details
- Born: February 14, 1884 Wagersville, Kentucky, U.S.
- Died: April 26, 1948 (aged 64) San Francisco, California, U.S.
- Party: Democratic
- Other political affiliations: Socialist (1900s–1910s); Farmer–Labor (1920s)
- Spouse: Elsa Bushweit (divorced)
- Children: Forrest; Jean; Georgia
- Occupation: Labor leader, politician

George Geddes Kidwell (February 14, 1884 – April 26, 1948) was an American labor leader and politician who served as secretary of the San Francisco Bakery Wagon Drivers' Union from 1917 to 1939 and as director of the California Department of Industrial Relations from 1939 to 1943. Communist Party journalist Al Richmond remembered Kidwell as a man "whose stature overshadowed his home base" in the Drivers' Union.

== Career ==
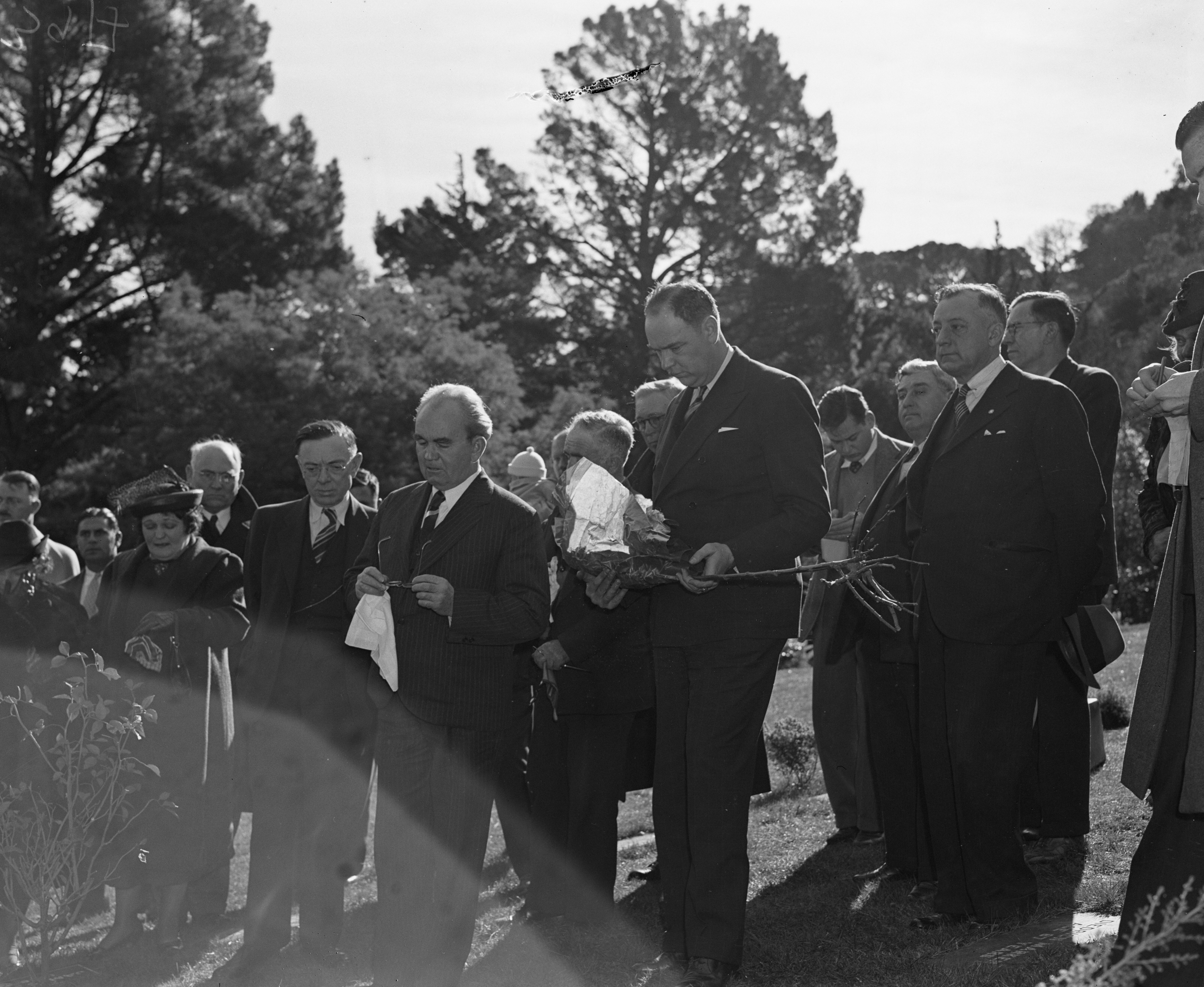
Thomas Mooney (center left, holding glasses and handkerchief) at his mother's grave, January 8, 1939. Kidwell is to the left of Mooney.

During his career in organized labor, Kidwell gained a reputation as a radical sympathetic to industrial unionism. When Tom Mooney and Warren K. Billings were convicted for the Preparedness Day bombing and sentenced to death, Kidwell and other labor leaders like Hugo Ernst and Paul Scharrenberg (who later succeeded him as director of Industrial Relations) lobbied successfully to save them from execution. After their sentences were commuted to life in prison, Kidwell proposed a general strike to force full pardons for both men. By the time of the 1934 West Coast waterfront strike however, Kidwell had moderated to the point that he, alongside Michael Casey of the Teamsters and Edward D. Vandeleur of the San Francisco Labor Council, opposed the calls by Harry Bridges for a general strike. After they were overridden and the strike began, Kidwell used his position on the general strike committee to defuse class divisions and guide both sides toward arbitration. After four days, the Labor Council voted to end the strike.

Kidwell was also active in electoral politics. He first ran for public office in 1908 as the unsuccessful Socialist candidate for State Assembly in the 40th district. 15 years later, he ran for Congress in the 1923 special election to succeed the late John I. Nolan. Now a Farmer–Laborite, Kidwell opposed the Esch–Cummins Act and called for veterans’ bonuses and U.S. recognition of the revolutionary governments in Mexico and Russia. He ultimately came in third place with 12.5% of the vote, losing to Nolan's widow Mae Nolan. As chairman of the California Farmer–Labor Party, Kidwell pledged the organization's support to Robert M. La Follette in the 1924 presidential election. In 1926, Kidwell ran once more for State Assembly in the 29th district, but lost the Democratic and Republican primaries to incumbent Harry F. Morrison.
