= Maria Isabel Vasquez Jimenez =

Maria Isabel Vasquez Jimenez (born 1990s, died May 16, 2008) was a farmworker whose death from heat illness while working in a vineyard near Stockton, California sparked policy changes in California and the United States.

Vasquez was working in a vineyard on May 14, 2008 when the temperature was above 95 degrees. Vasquez collapsed from heat exhaustion. By the time she reached the hospital, her body temperature was 108 degrees. She died two days later. She was two months pregnant. She was 17 years old.

California Governor Arnold Schwarzenegger attended her funeral.

Following her death and other similar cases, the California Division of Occupational Safety and Health (Cal/OSHA) strengthened its rules on heat twice (in 2010 and 2015) and launched an educational campaign. One of the regulations begins with "This section shall be known and may be cited as the Maria Isabel Vasquez Jimenez heat illness standard."
