= John F. Henning =

American diplomat (1915–2009)

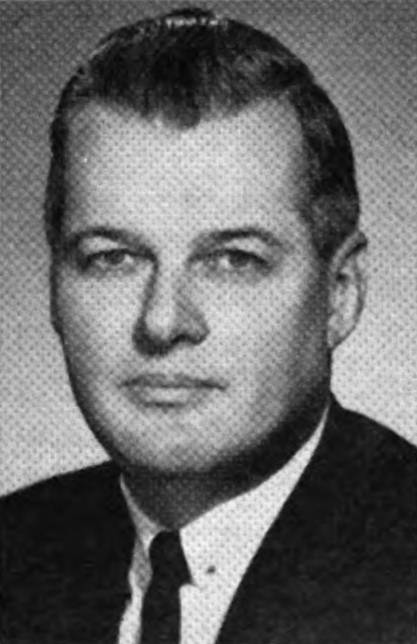
- Henning c. 1961

Executive Secretary-Treasurer of the California Labor Federation
- In office March 12, 1970 – July 30, 1996
- Preceded by: Thomas L. Pitts
- Succeeded by: Art Pulaski

United States Ambassador to New Zealand
- In office April 5, 1967 – September 9, 1969
- President: Lyndon B. Johnson
- Preceded by: Herbert B. Powell
- Succeeded by: Kenneth Franzheim II

14th United States Under Secretary of Labor
- In office September 26, 1962 – April 5, 1967
- President: John F. Kennedy; Lyndon B. Johnson
- Preceded by: W. Willard Wirtz
- Succeeded by: James J. Reynolds, Jr.

Director of the California Department of Industrial Relations
- In office January 5, 1959 – September 26, 1962
- Appointed by: Pat Brown
- Preceded by: Edward P. Park
- Succeeded by: Ernest B. Webb

Personal details
- Born: November 22, 1915 San Francisco, California, U.S.
- Died: June 4, 2009 (aged 93) San Francisco, California, U.S.
- Party: Democratic
- Other political affiliations: Democratic Socialists of America
- Spouse: Betty Morand (m. 1939)
- Children: 7
- Education: Saint Mary's College of California (B.A.)
- Occupation: Labor leader, civil servant
- Known for: Activism, leadership in campaign to restore Cal/OSHA
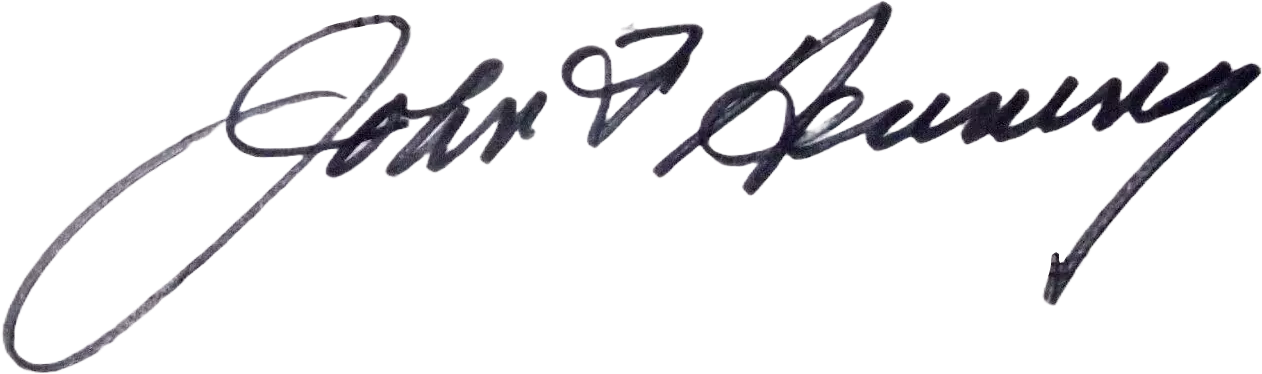
- Signature

John Francis "Jack" Henning (November 22, 1915 – June 4, 2009) was an American labor leader and civil servant who served as director of the California Department of Industrial Relations from 1959 to 1962, under secretary of labor from 1962 to 1967, U.S. ambassador to New Zealand from 1967 to 1969, and executive secretary-treasurer of the California Labor Federation from 1970 to 1996. Called "one of organized labor's greatest leaders" and "legendary" for his defense of labor, he is also credited with a significant role in the defense of minimum wage laws and civil rights.

== Biography ==
John Francis Henning was born in San Francisco, California, in November 1915 to lower middle-class Irish American parents. His paternal grandfather, Thomas Henning, was born in Rathfriland, County Down, Northern Ireland. His maternal grandfather was a member of Teamsters Local 85, one of the oldest Teamsters locals in the West. His father was a plumber and charter member of the United Association of Journeymen Plumbers, Gas Fitters, Steam Fitters, and Steam Fitters' Helpers of the United States and Canada who lost his job during the anti-union drives after World War I for his work with the Association of Catholic Trade Unionists.

After graduating with a bachelor's degree in English literature from Saint Mary's College of California, Henning took a position with the Association of Catholic Trade Unionists in San Francisco in 1938, and in 1949 began working for the California Labor Federation (CLF) (the official American Federation of Labor organization in California) as administrative assistant to the Executive Secretary-Treasurer. In 1970, the CLF elected him as Executive Secretary-Treasurer, a position he held until 1996.

He was active in the Knights of the Red Branch, an Irish Catholic fraternal organization, in the 1940s, and a strong supporter of the Irish republicanism, the Irish Northern Aid Committee, and the Irish American Unity Conference. He also co-founded the Irish Literary and Historical Society in the 1945.

From 1959 to 1962, Henning was director of the California Department of Industrial Relations. He served as Under Secretary of Labor in the U.S. Department of Labor from 1962 to 1967, where, as Nancy Pelosi noted in a 2000 tribute in Congressional Record, "he was instrumental [...] in preventing restaurants from counting tips as wages under minimum wage laws, and in encouraging the U.S. labor movement to take strong stands for civil rights." Henning also worked for civil rights during his term as regent of the University of California from 1989 to 1997, responding to apartheid in South Africa by attempting to divest the university's holdings there.

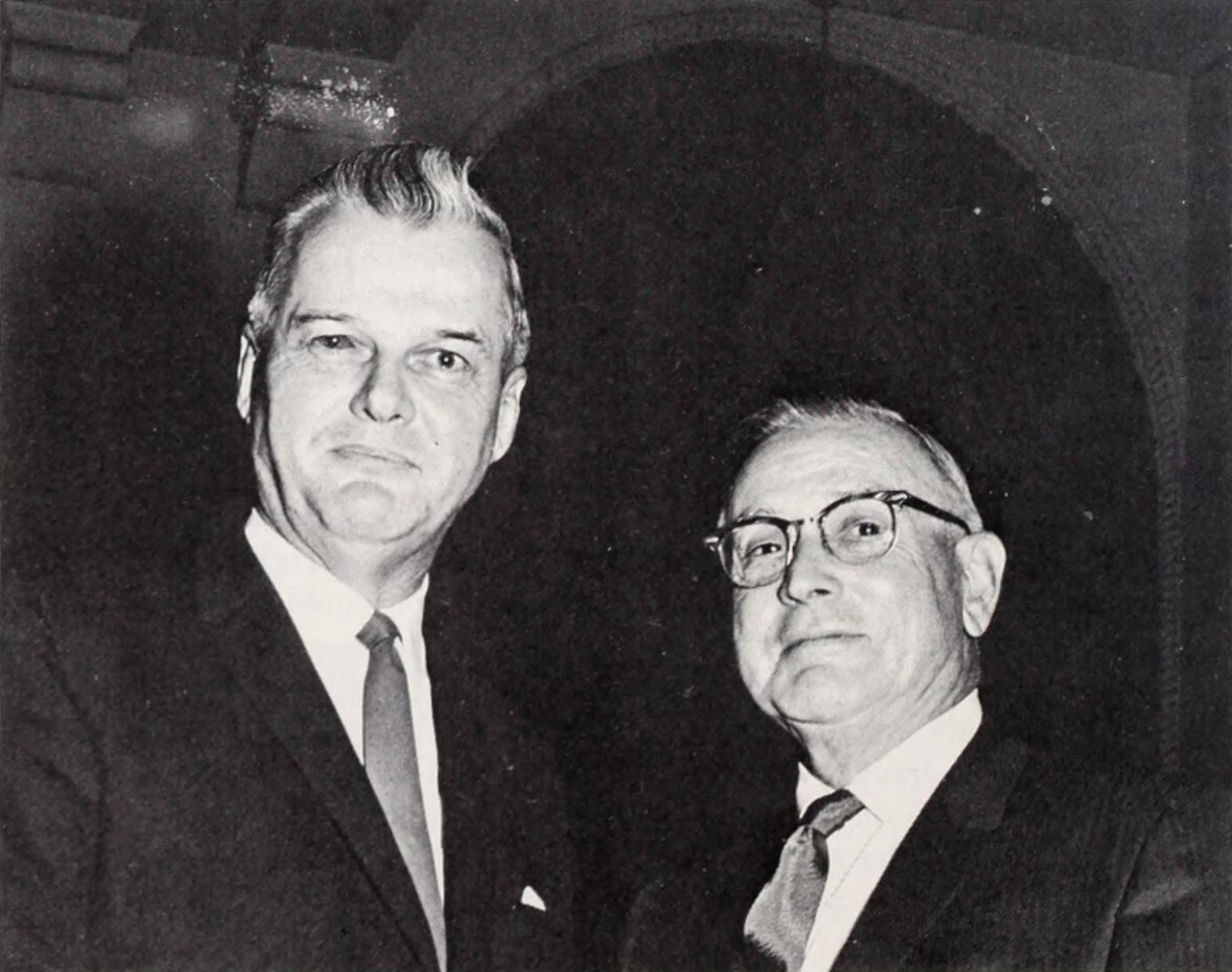
Henning (left) with LIU General Secretary-Treasurer J. Earl Ferguson, 1967

In 1967, Henning was appointed U.S. Ambassador to New Zealand by president Lyndon B. Johnson, serving until 1969. Henning was a close friend and ally of labor leader César Chávez, and helped the United Farm Workers win passage of the California Agricultural Labor Relations Act. He also successfully pushed for the restoration of the California Occupational Safety and Health Administration (CalOSHA) after it was abolished in 1988 by governor George Deukmejian.

Henning was also a former regent or member of the board of trustees of Lone Mountain College and St. Mary's College of California. He served on the San Francisco Public Welfare Commission, San Francisco Fair Employment Practices Commission, and San Francisco Board of Permit Appeals.

In 1997, St. Mary's College of California created the Henning Institute to encourage and present scholarship on Catholic social thought. The John F. Henning Center for International Labor Relations was created by the Center for Labor Research and Education at the University of California, Berkeley in 1999 to promote the study of labor and policy research in the global economy.

Henning and his wife, Betty, had seven children (John Jr., Brian, Patrick, Nancy, Daniel, Thomas, and Mary). Betty Henning died in 1994. His son, Patrick, served as California state labor commissioner and then director of the state's employment development department.

John Henning died at his home in San Francisco on June 4, 2009, in his sleep after a long illness.

== Awards and honors ==
Henning was named a recipient of the Ellis Island Medal of Honor in 1986.

He received honorary doctorates from Saint Anselm College, St. Bonaventure University, and St. Mary's College of California.

== Notes ==
Diplomatic posts
Preceded by Herbert B. Powell	U.S. Ambassador to New Zealand; 1967 – 1969	Succeeded by Kenneth Franzheim II

Trade union offices
Preceded by Thomas L. Pitts	Secretary-Treasurer of the California Labor Federation; 1970–1996	Succeeded by Art Pulaski
