= James Edward Hopkins =

American politician

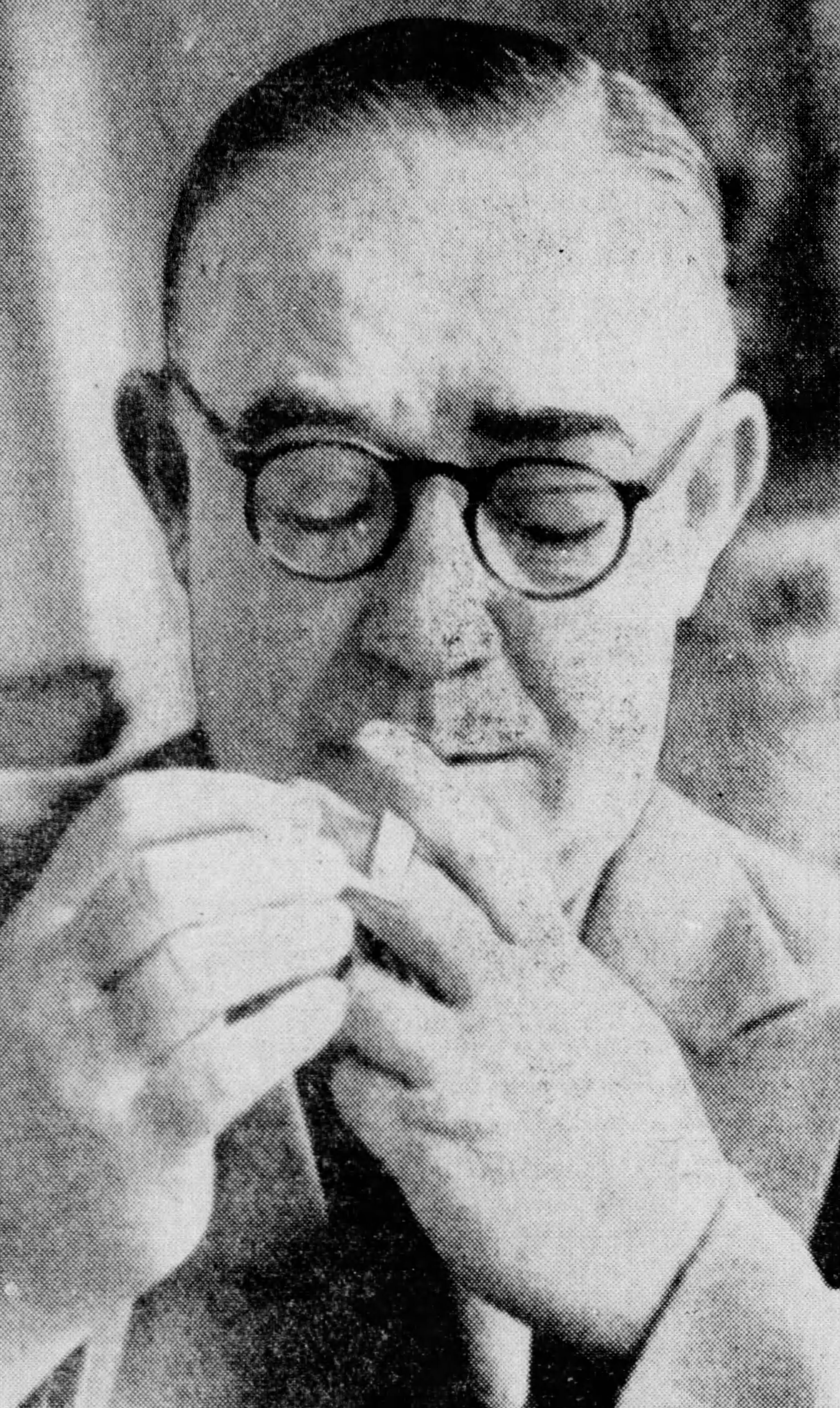
- Hopkins in 1936

President of the California Labor Federation
- In office March 23, 1936 – September 15, 1937
- Preceded by: Edward D. Vandeleur
- Succeeded by: C. J. Haggerty

Member of the California State Assembly from the 31st district
- In office January 4, 1909 – January 2, 1911
- Preceded by: Daniel J. Toomey
- Succeeded by: Walter A. McDonald

Personal details
- Born: May 12, 1879 San Francisco, California, U.S.
- Died: March 19, 1939 (aged 59) San Francisco, California, U.S.
- Party: Union Labor
- Other political affiliations: Democratic; Independence
- Occupation: Teamster

James Edward Hopkins (May 12, 1879 – March 19, 1939) was an American labor leader and politician who served one term in the California State Assembly for the 31st district from 1909 to 1911 and later as president of the California Labor Federation from 1936 to 1937.

== Biography ==
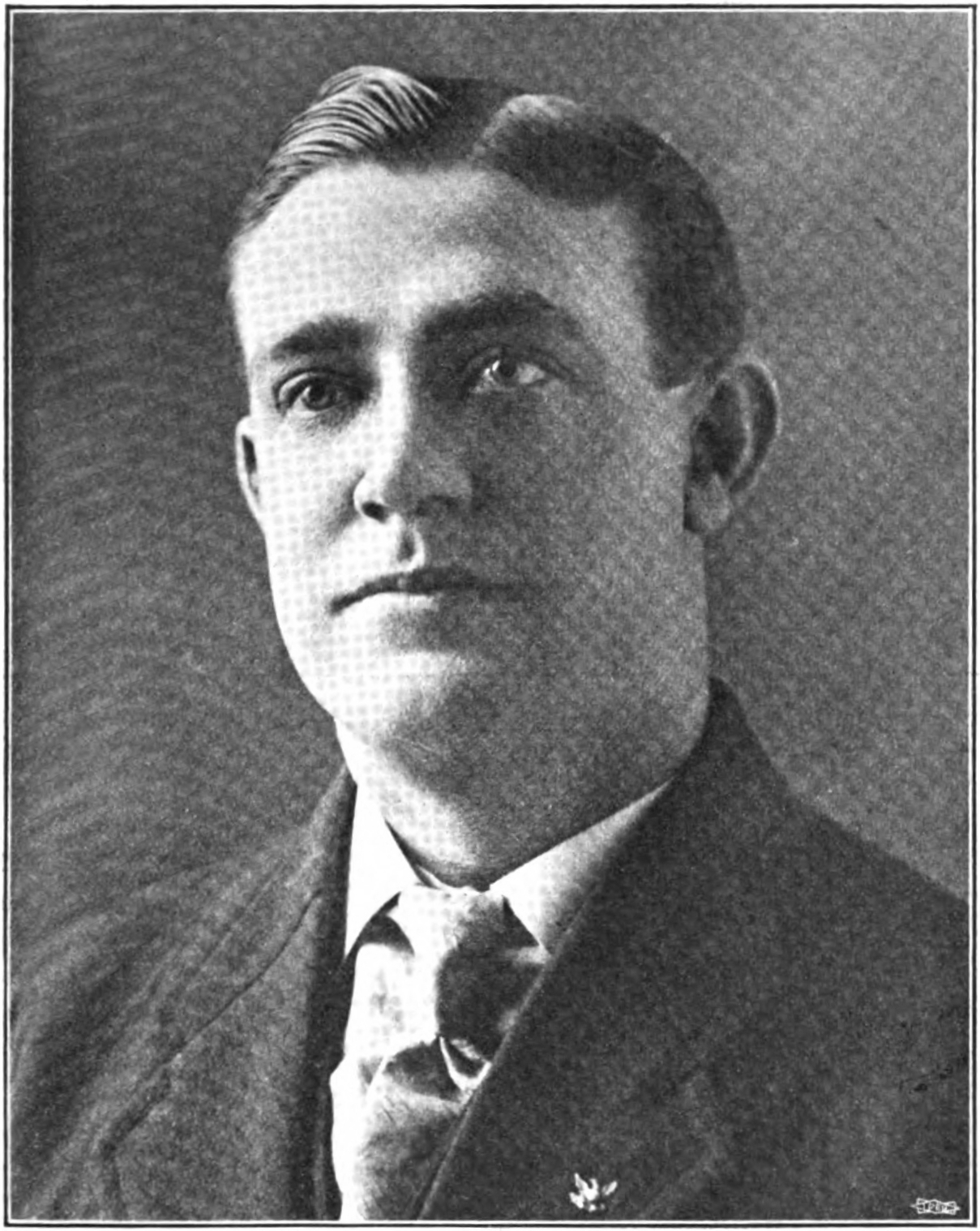
Hopkins as vice president of the California State Federation of Labor, 1915

Hopkins began his career as a Teamster, serving as a delegate to the San Francisco Labor Council. In 1908, he became secretary of the Thirty-first Assembly District Union Labor Club, and was elected to the California State Assembly on a Democratic-Union Labor-Independence League ticket that November. He did not stand for re-election in 1910.

In 1910, Hopkins was made a Deputy Sheriff of San Francisco. On August 30, he accidentally shot and killed fellow Deputy Walter J. Bryant. He was arrested on murder charges, but was exonerated the next day after multiple witnesses came to his defense.

Hopkins continued his career in organized labor after leaving the Assembly, joining the executive board of the state Federation of Labor in 1912. He served in that position for twenty-four years before being elected President in March 1936.

A self-described "ultra-conservative" dedicated to fighting radicalism within the ranks of organized labor, Hopkins nonetheless called for the repeal of the California Criminal Syndicalism Act. His term as President ended in September 1937.

Hopkins died of a heart attack at his San Francisco home on March 19, 1939.
