= Art Pulaski =

American labor unionist

Executive Secretary-Treasurer of the California Labor Federation
- In office July 30, 1996 – July 27, 2022
- Preceded by: John F. Henning
- Succeeded by: Lorena Gonzalez

Personal details
- Born: 1952 or 1953 (age 73–74)
- Spouse: Josie Mooney
- Children: 3
- Education: Southern Connecticut State University (BA); University of Minnesota (MA)

Art Pulaski is an organized labor leader in California. Since 1996, Pulaski has served as Executive-Secretary Treasurer and Chief Officer of the California Labor Federation, which represents 2.3 million workers of 1,200 manufacturing, service, construction and public sector unions. He also served as the Executive Secretary of the San Mateo Labor Council in California from 1984 to 1996.

Pulaski's career in organized labor began in Connecticut at the age of 16, as a stock clerk in a supermarket, when he joined the Amalgamated Meat Cutters union. Pulaski holds a Bachelor's degree from Southern Connecticut State University in New Haven, and master's degree in community organization at the University of Minnesota.

Early in his career, Pulaski built coalitions with union and community groups to reform energy policies and protect retirees, and has helped build stronger alliances between unions, community groups and faith-based organizations for numerous reform campaigns. In 2003, he led the creation of the Stand for California Coalition, a group of labor unions, religious organizations, civil rights groups and business interests. He also played a leadership role in the development of the Apollo Alliance, a national coalition for cleaner energy and better jobs.

Under Pulaski's leadership, the California Labor Federation's achievements have included restoring daily overtime pay, raising the minimum wage, increasing benefits for injured and unemployed workers, creating collective bargaining opportunities for hundreds of thousands of public sector workers, and passing the nation's first comprehensive Paid Family Leave law. In 2010, the Federation led the successful campaign to ensure every California democrat in Congress voted in favor of the landmark federal health care reform legislation.

Pulaski has served as president of several non-profit organizations, including the California Works Foundation and the Labor Project for Working Families. As president of “We Do the Work,” he helped craft the successful nationally televised PBS series of the same name. He co-founded PalCare, a model childcare center serving the families of workers at San Francisco International Airport. Pulaski has served on numerous gubernatorial panels and commissions on economic progress, workforce development and higher education.

Pulaski has led the California labor movement in new strategies of political action and economic development. Since he took office at the California Labor Federation in 1996 the labor group has more than doubled in size.
