= Paul Scharrenberg =

German-American labor leader (1877–1969)

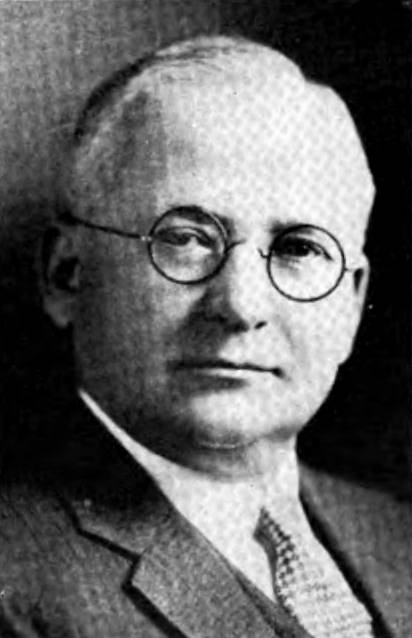
- Scharrenberg c. 1931

Executive Secretary-Treasurer of the California Labor Federation
- In office October 7, 1909 – March 23, 1936
- Preceded by: George W. Bell
- Succeeded by: Edward D. Vandeleur

Director of the California Department of Industrial Relations
- In office January 4, 1943 – February 1, 1955
- Appointed by: Earl Warren
- Preceded by: George G. Kidwell
- Succeeded by: Ernest B. Webb

Personal details
- Born: August 21, 1877 Hamburg, German Empire
- Died: October 27, 1969 (aged 92) Cupertino, California, U.S.
- Party: Republican
- Spouse: Elenor Heine (died)
- Children: 1
- Occupation: Labor leader, civil servant, seaman

Paul Scharrenberg (August 21, 1877 – October 27, 1969) was a German-American labor union leader. He served as Executive Secretary-Treasurer of the California Labor Federation from 1909 to 1936, legislative representative for the American Federation of Labor in Washington, D.C. from 1937 to 1943, and Director of the California Department of Industrial Relations from 1943 until his retirement in 1955.

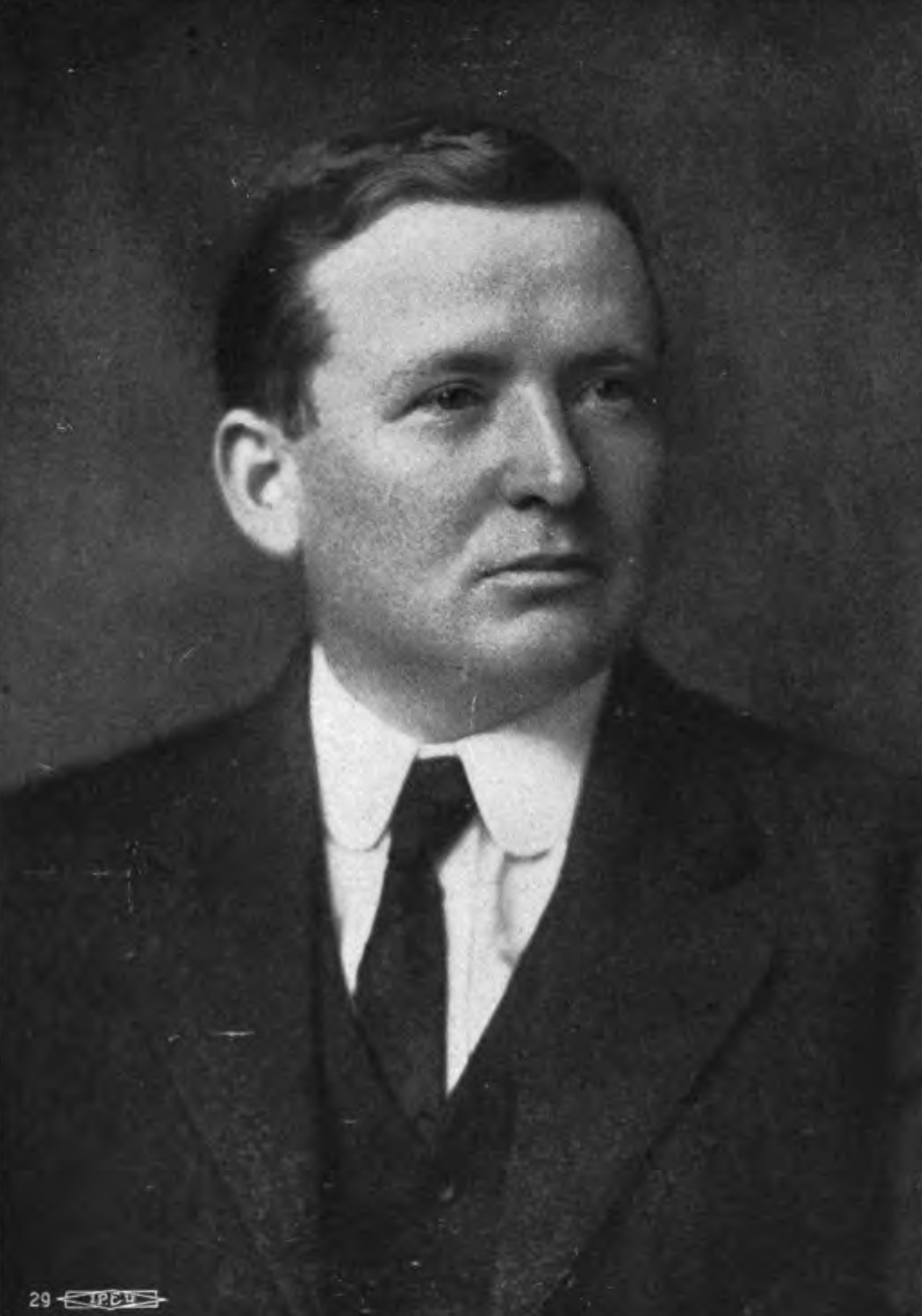
Scharrenberg c. 1912

When Tom Mooney and Warren K. Billings were convicted for the Preparedness Day bombing and sentenced to death, Scarrenberg and other labor leaders like Hugo Ernst and George G. Kidwell (who he later succeeded as director of Industrial Relations) lobbied successfully to save them from execution.

During his career he served on a number of boards and commissions, including the State Commission of Immigration and Housing, the San Francisco City Planning Commission, the State Board of Harbor Commissioners, and the Federal Mediation and Conciliation Service.

Trade union offices
Preceded by George W. Bell	Secretary-Treasurer of the California Labor Federation; 1909–1936	Succeeded by Edward D. Vandeleur
