= Thomas L. Pitts =

American labor leader (1914–1971)

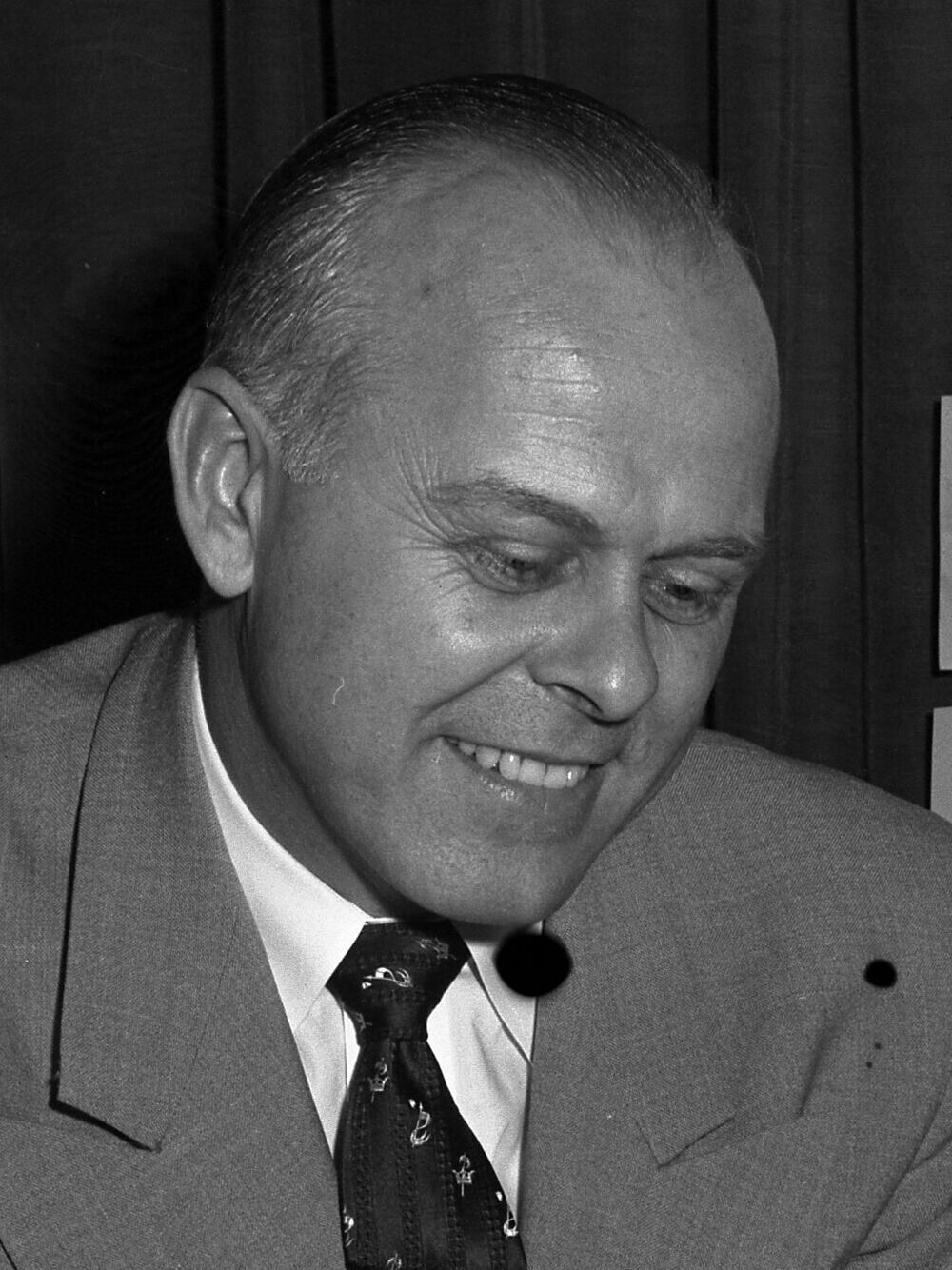
- Pitts in 1954

Executive Secretary-Treasurer of the California Labor Federation
- In office March 4, 1960 – March 12, 1970
- Preceded by: C. J. Haggerty
- Succeeded by: John F. Henning

President of the California Labor Federation
- In office October 12, 1950 – March 4, 1960
- Preceded by: John F. Shelley
- Succeeded by: Albin J. Gruhn

Personal details
- Born: Thomas Lloyd Pitts; December 30, 1914 De Soto, Missouri, U.S.
- Died: September 1, 1971 (aged 56) Kelseyville, California, U.S.
- Spouse(s): Lula Mae (m. 1933, divorced) Mary Louise (m. 1948; div. 1950) Gwen
- Children: 4
- Occupation: Labor leader

Thomas Lloyd Pitts (December 30, 1914 – September 1, 1971) was an American labor union leader. He served as President of the California Labor Federation from 1950 to 1960, then as Executive Secretary-Treasurer from 1960 to 1970.

Pitts started working as a truck driver at 17, and in 1936 became a business representative for the Los Angeles Freight Drivers' Union.

As leader of the California Labor Federation, Pitts worked to unionize farmworkers and fought against the Bracero Program.

Trade union offices
Preceded by John F. Shelley	President of the California Labor Federation; 1950–1960	Succeeded by Albin J. Gruhn
Preceded by C. J. Haggerty	Secretary-Treasurer of the California Labor Federation; 1960–1970	Succeeded by John F. Henning
