= C. J. Haggerty =

American labor leader (1894–1971)

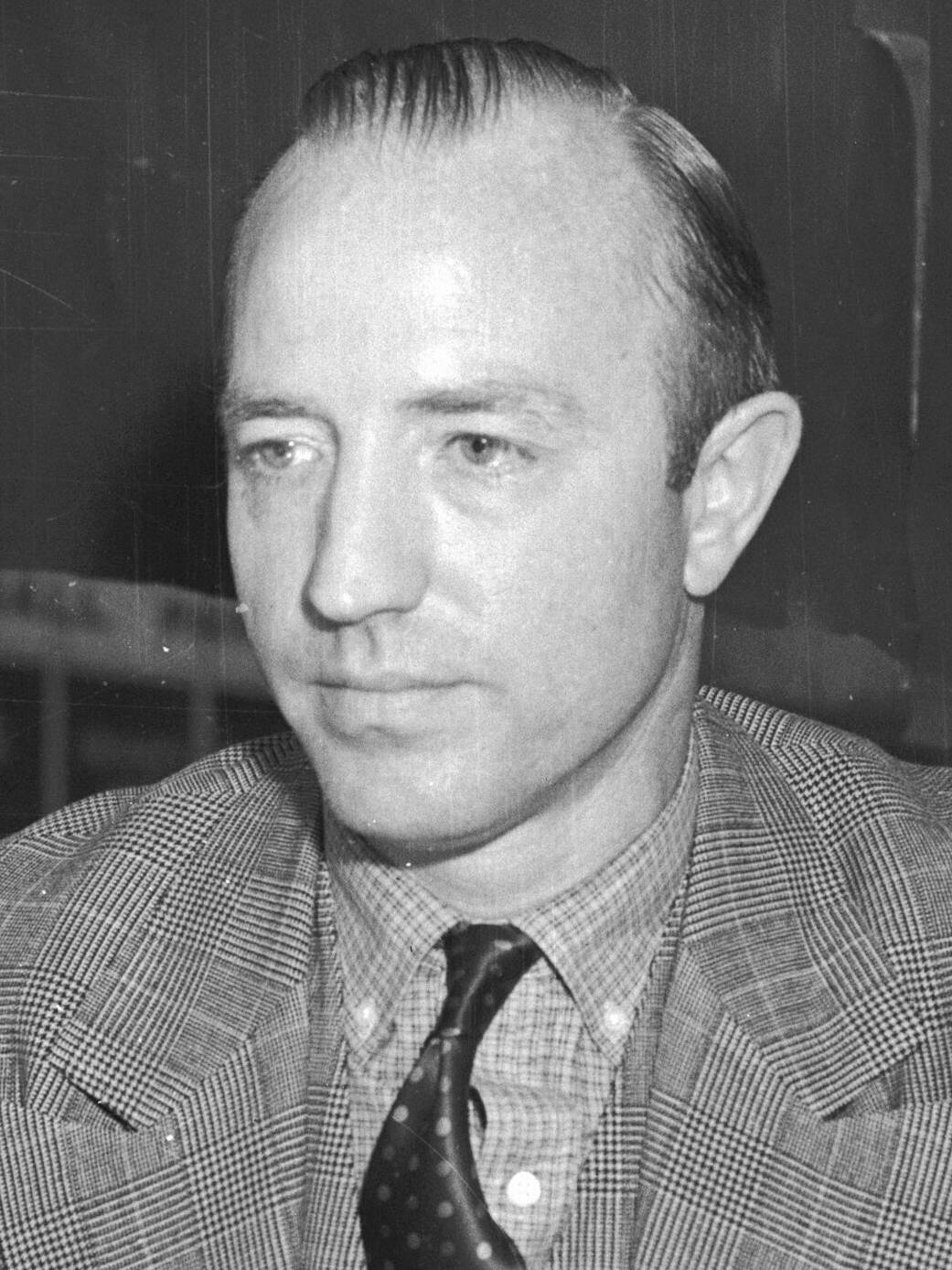
- Haggerty in 1937

Executive Secretary-Treasurer of the California Labor Federation
- In office October 31, 1943 – March 4, 1960
- Preceded by: Edward D. Vandeleur
- Succeeded by: Thomas L. Pitts

President of the California Labor Federation
- In office September 16, 1937 – October 31, 1943
- Preceded by: James Edward Hopkins
- Succeeded by: Anthony L. Noriega

Personal details
- Born: Cornelius Joseph Haggerty; January 10, 1894 Boston, Massachusetts, U.S.
- Died: October 10, 1971 (aged 77) Palm Springs, California, U.S.
- Party: Democratic
- Spouse: Peggy Kelleher
- Children: 2
- Occupation: Labor leader, civil servant

Military service
- Allegiance: United States
- Branch/service: United States Navy
- Years of service: 1917–1921
- Rank: Chief Carpenter's Mate
- Battles/wars: World War I

Cornelius Joseph "Neil" Haggerty (January 10, 1894 – October 10, 1971) was an American labor union leader. He served as President of the California Labor Federation from 1937 to 1943, then as Executive Secretary-Treasurer from 1943 to 1960.

== Biography ==
Born in Boston, Haggerty worked briefly as a singer before completing an apprenticeship as a lather. He joined the Wood, Wire and Metal Lathers' International Union in 1915. He served in the United States Navy during World War I, then returned to lathing, moving to Los Angeles in 1921.

Haggerty began working full-time for his union as an organizer on the West Coast, later becoming a vice-president of the union. In 1933, he was elected as president of the Los Angeles Building and Construction Trades Council. He became president of the Californian State Federation of Labor in 1937, and then secretary in 1943.

During World War II, Haggerty served on the War Manpower Commission, and the executives of the Office of Price Administration and the Civil Defense Council. In 1960, he became president of the Building and Construction Trade Department of the AFL-CIO, in which role he often came into conflict with Walter P. Reuther. He opposed wage controls, and argued for the training of more black construction workers. He retired in 1970.

Haggerty also served on the Californian State Board of Education. He died in 1971.

Trade union offices
Preceded by James E. Hopkins	President of the California Labor Federation; 1937–1943	Succeeded by Charles W. Real
Preceded by Edward D. Vandeleur	Secretary-Treasurer of the California Labor Federation; 1943–1960	Succeeded by Thomas L. Pitts
Preceded by Paul L. Phillips; James Suffridge	American Federation of Labor delegate to the Trades Union Congress; 1955; With: Michael Fox	Succeeded by Emil Rieve; William F. Schnitzler
Preceded by Richard J. Gray	President of the Building and Construction Trade Department; 1960–1970	Succeeded by Frank Bonadio
