= 1934 West Coast waterfront strike =

Labor strike by longshoremen in California, Oregon, and Washington

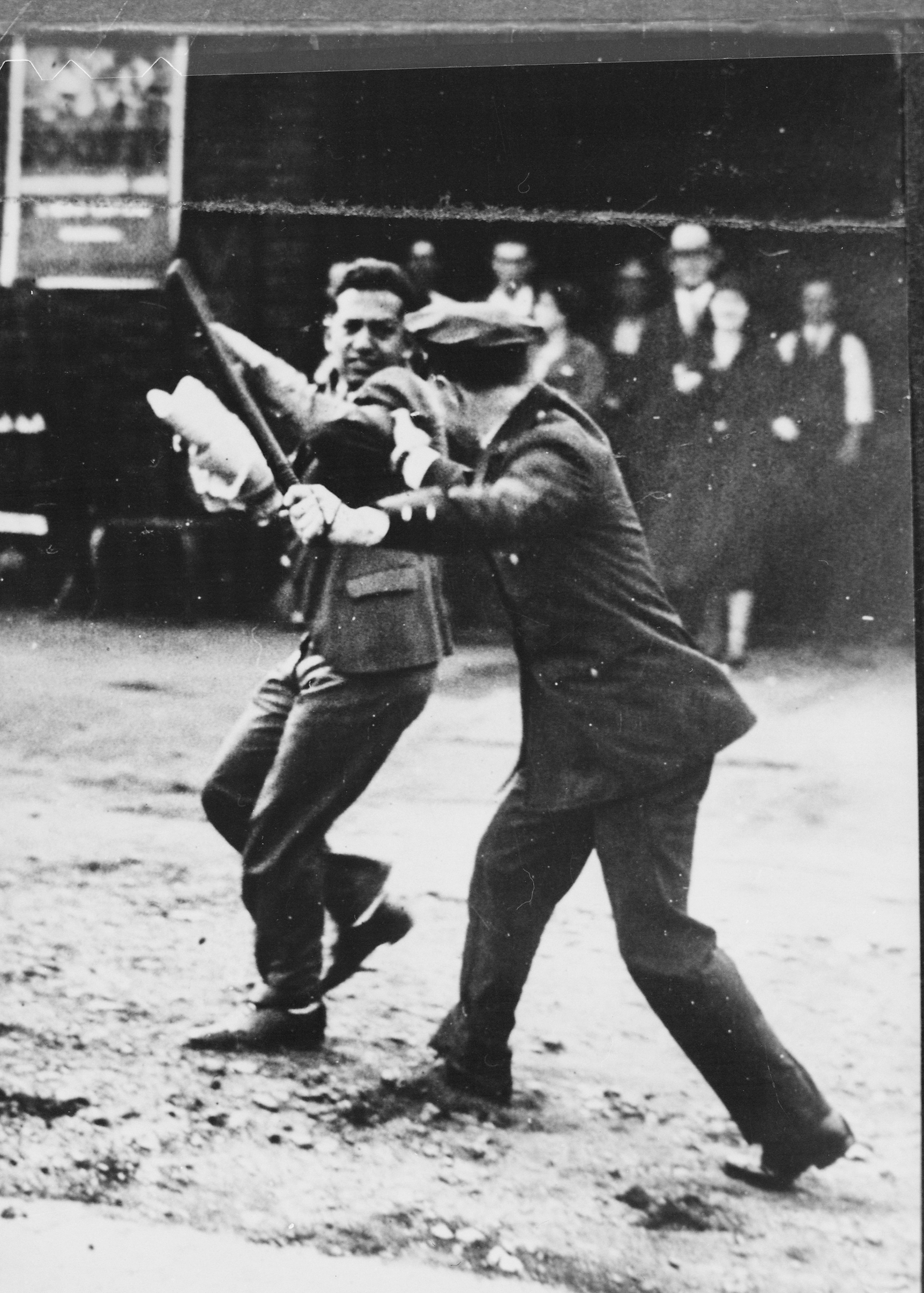
- Confrontation between a policeman wielding a night stick and a striker during the San Francisco General Strike, 1934
- Date: May 9 – July 31, 1934 (84 days)
- Location: Everett, Washington; Portland, Oregon; San Francisco, California; Seattle, Washington; Los Angeles, California
- Methods: Strikes, protest, demonstrations

Parties
International Longshore and Warehouse Union	California National Guard

Lead figures
Harry Bridges; Paddy Morris; Jack Bjorklund; Joseph P. Ryan	Frank Merriam; Angelo Rossi; Julius Meier

Casualties and losses
Deaths: 9, Injuries:>1000, Arrests: >500.	Deaths: Injuries:

The 1934 West Coast waterfront strike (also known as the 1934 West Coast longshoremen's strike, as well as a number of variations on these names) began on May 9, 1934, when longshoremen in every U.S. West Coast port walked out. It lasted 83 days. Organized by the International Longshoremen's Association (ILA), the strike peaked with the death of two workers on "Bloody Thursday" and the subsequent San Francisco General Strike, which stopped all work in the major port city for four days, and led ultimately to the settlement of the West Coast Longshoremen's Strike.

The result of the strike was the unionization of all of the West Coast ports of the United States. The San Francisco General Strike of 1934, along with the Toledo Auto-Lite Strike of 1934 led by the American Workers Party and the Minneapolis Teamsters Strike of 1934 led by the Communist League of America, were catalysts for the rise of industrial unionism in the 1930s, much of which was organized through the Congress of Industrial Organizations.

== Background ==
The 1916 West Coast waterfront strike was the first instance of coastwide organizational unity among West Coast longshore workers. The strike resulted in a massive defeat for the ILA, and employers launched an effort to eliminate the ILA's presence on the waterfront entirely.

In the years immediately after World War I, when the shipping companies and stevedoring firms had imposed the open shop after a series of failed strikes, longshoremen on the West Coast ports were unorganized or represented by company unions. Longshoremen in San Francisco, then the major port on the coast, were required to go through a hiring hall operated by a company union, known as the "blue book" system for the color of the membership book.

The Industrial Workers of the World, nicknamed "Wobblies," had attempted to organize longshoremen, sailors and fishermen in the 1920s through their Marine Transport Workers Union. Their largest strike, the 1923 San Pedro Maritime Strike, stalled shipping in that harbor but was crushed by a combination of injunctions, mass arrests and vigilantism by the American Legion. Other Wobbly-led strikes occurred in Seattle in 1919 and Portland in 1922. While the IWW was a spent force after that strike, syndicalist thinking remained popular on the docks. Longshoremen and sailors on the West Coast also had contacts with an Australian syndicalist movement that called itself the "One Big Union" formed after the defeat of a general strike there in 1917.

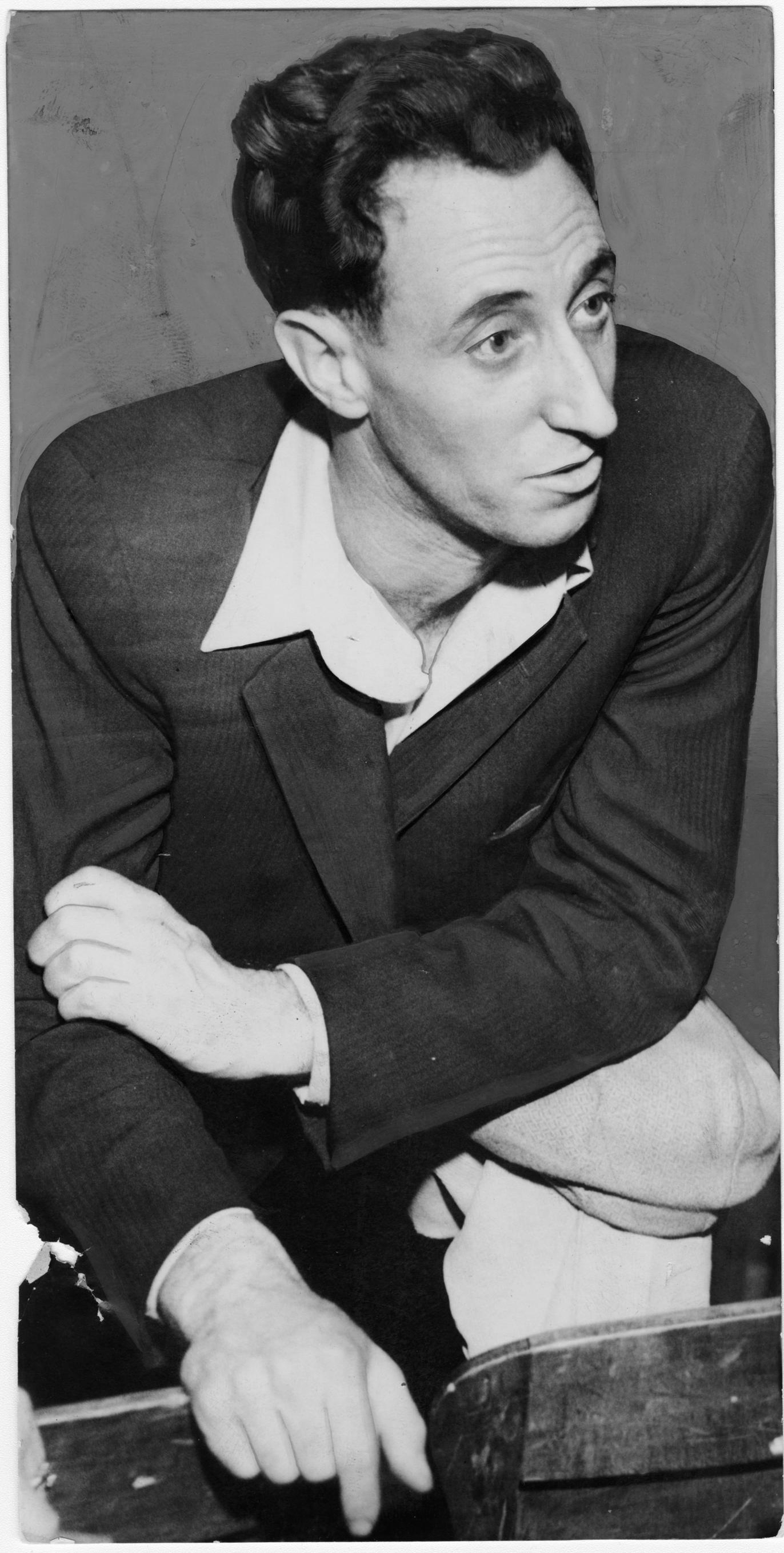
Harry Bridges, one of the leaders of the strike, July 9, 1934

The Communist Party had also been active in the area in the late 1920s, seeking to organize all categories of maritime workers into a single union, the Marine Workers Industrial Union (MWIU), as part of the drive during the Third Period to create revolutionary unions. The MWIU never made much headway on the West Coast, but it did attract a number of former IWW members and foreign-born militants. Harry Bridges, an Australian-born sailor who became a longshoreman after coming to the United States and played an instrumental role in organizing the 1934 strike, was often alleged to be an active member of the Communist party.

Militants published a newspaper, The Waterfront Worker, which focused on longshoremen's most pressing demands: more men on each gang, lighter loads and an independent union. While a number of the individuals in this group were Communist Party members, the group as a whole was independent of the party: although it criticized the International Seamen's Union (ISU) as weak and the International Longshoremen's Association (ILA), which had its base on the East Coast, as corrupt, it was not wholly loyal to the MWIU, but emphasized the creation of small groups of activists at each port to serve as the first step in a slow, careful movement to unionize the industry.

Grassroots reform of the ILA locals would gradually marginalize the MWIU. Just as the passage of the National Industrial Recovery Act had led to a spontaneous significant rise in union membership among coal miners in 1933, thousands of longshoremen now joined the fledgling ILA locals that reappeared on the West Coast. The MWIU declined as Communist Party activists were absorbed into the ILA.

These newly emboldened workers first went after the "blue book" union, refusing to pay dues to it and tearing up their membership books. The militants who had published "The Waterfront Worker", now known as the "Albion Hall group" after their usual meeting place, continued organizing dock committees that soon began launching slowdowns and other types of job actions in order to win better working conditions. While the official leadership of the ILA remained in the hands of conservatives sent to the West Coast by President Joseph P. Ryan of the ILA, the Albion Hall group started in March, 1934 to press demands for a coastwide contract, a union-run hiring hall and an industry wide waterfront federation. When the conservative ILA leadership negotiated a weak "gentlemen's agreement" with the employers that had been brokered by the mediation board created by the administration of President Franklin D. Roosevelt, Bridges led the membership in rejecting it.

Disputes revolved around the issue of recognition: the union demanded a closed shop, a coastwide contract and a union hiring hall. The employers offered to arbitrate the dispute, but insisted that the union agree to an open shop as a condition of any agreement to arbitrate. The longshoremen rejected the proposal to arbitrate.

== The Big Strike ==
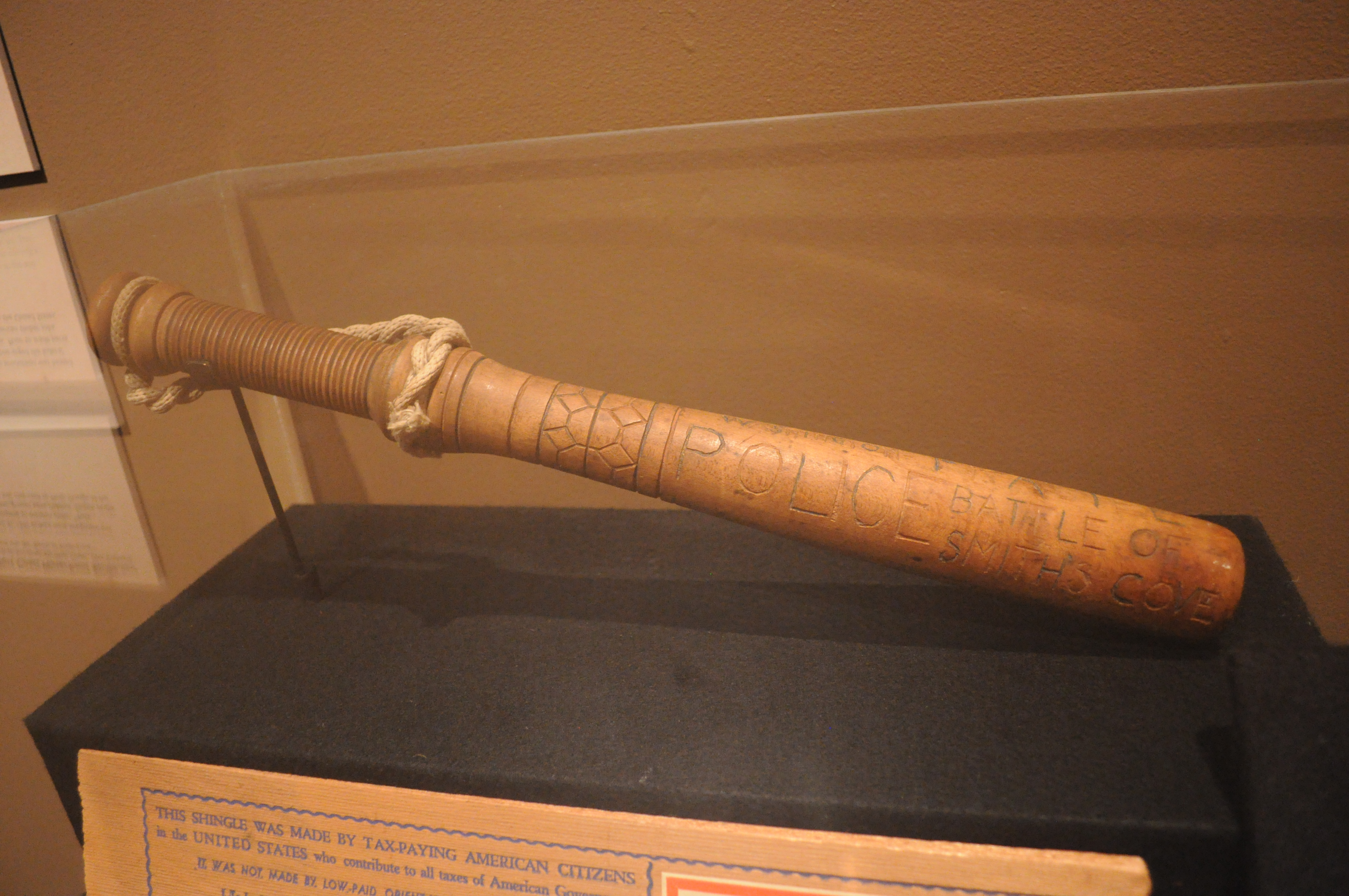
An engraved billy club commemorates police activity in the Battle of Smith Cove in Seattle

The strike began on May 9, 1934, as longshoremen in every West Coast port walked out; sailors joined them several days later. The employers recruited strikebreakers, housing them on moored ships or in walled compounds and bringing them to and from work under police protection. Strikers attacked the stockade housing strikebreakers in San Pedro on May 15; police fired into the strikers, killing two and injuring many. The killing of Dick Parker created resentment up and down the coast. Daily similar smaller clashes broke out in San Francisco and Oakland, California, Portland, Oregon, and Seattle, Washington. Strikers also succeeded in slowing down or stopping the movement of goods by rail out of the ports.

The Roosevelt administration tried again to broker a deal to end the strike, but the membership twice rejected the agreements their leadership brought to them and continued the strike. The employers then decided to make a show of force to reopen the port in San Francisco. On Tuesday, July 3, fights broke out along the Embarcadero in San Francisco between police and strikers while a handful of trucks driven by young businessmen made it through the picket line.

Some Teamsters supported the strikers by refusing to handle "hot cargo" – goods which had been unloaded by strikebreakers – although the Teamsters' leadership was not as supportive. By the end of May, Dave Beck, president of the Seattle Teamsters, and Mike Casey, president of those in San Francisco, thought the maritime strike had lasted too long. They encouraged the strikers to take what they could get from the employers and threatened to use Teamsters as strikebreakers if the ILA did not return to work.

Shipping companies, government officials, some union leaders and the press began to raise fears that the strike was the result of communist agitation. This "red scare" also helped ignite a controversy about the New Deal Public Works of Art Project murals that were at the time being completed in San Francisco's Coit Tower (on Telegraph Hill, close to the location of the strike in San Francisco), leading to the postponing of the tower's July 7 opening, and later to the removal of communist symbols from two of the American Social Realism style murals.

Date	Location	Workers killed	Notes
May 15, 1934	San Pedro, CA	2	When 500 strikers attacked and tried to set fire to a ship housing strikebreakers in San Pedro, police unsuccessfully tried to stop them with tear gas, then shot into the crowd, killing strikers Dick Parker and John Knudsen.
June 30, 1934	Seattle, WA	1	Upon hearing that replacement crews were about to take two oil tankers out of the port, union members went to the dock. When the longshoremen tried to get past the dock's gates, they were ambushed by guards. Worker Shelvy Daffron was shot in the back and later died.
July 5, 1934	San Francisco, CA	2	When striking longshoremen surrounded a San Francisco police car and tried to tip it over, the police shot into the air, and then fired into the crowd, killing Nick Bordoise (originally named Nick Counderakis) and Howard Sperry.
July 19, 1934	Seattle, WA	1	1934 West Coast Waterfront Strike: Olaf Helland was a Sailor on strike supporting Seattle Longshoremen, During the Battle of Smith cove a Police Officer shot an unexploded tear gas cannister into the back of Olaf Helland's Head. Olaf Helland Died a few hours later at a hospital.
August 20, 1934	Portland, OR	1	James Connor, a 22-year-old college student and newlywed working as a replacement worker on his vacation, was shot and killed in an altercation with striking longshoremen. This was one of a string of violent incidents, including visiting Senator Robert F. Wagner coming under fire. A second replacement worker named R.A. Griffin was also wounded in the head.

== "Bloody Thursday" ==
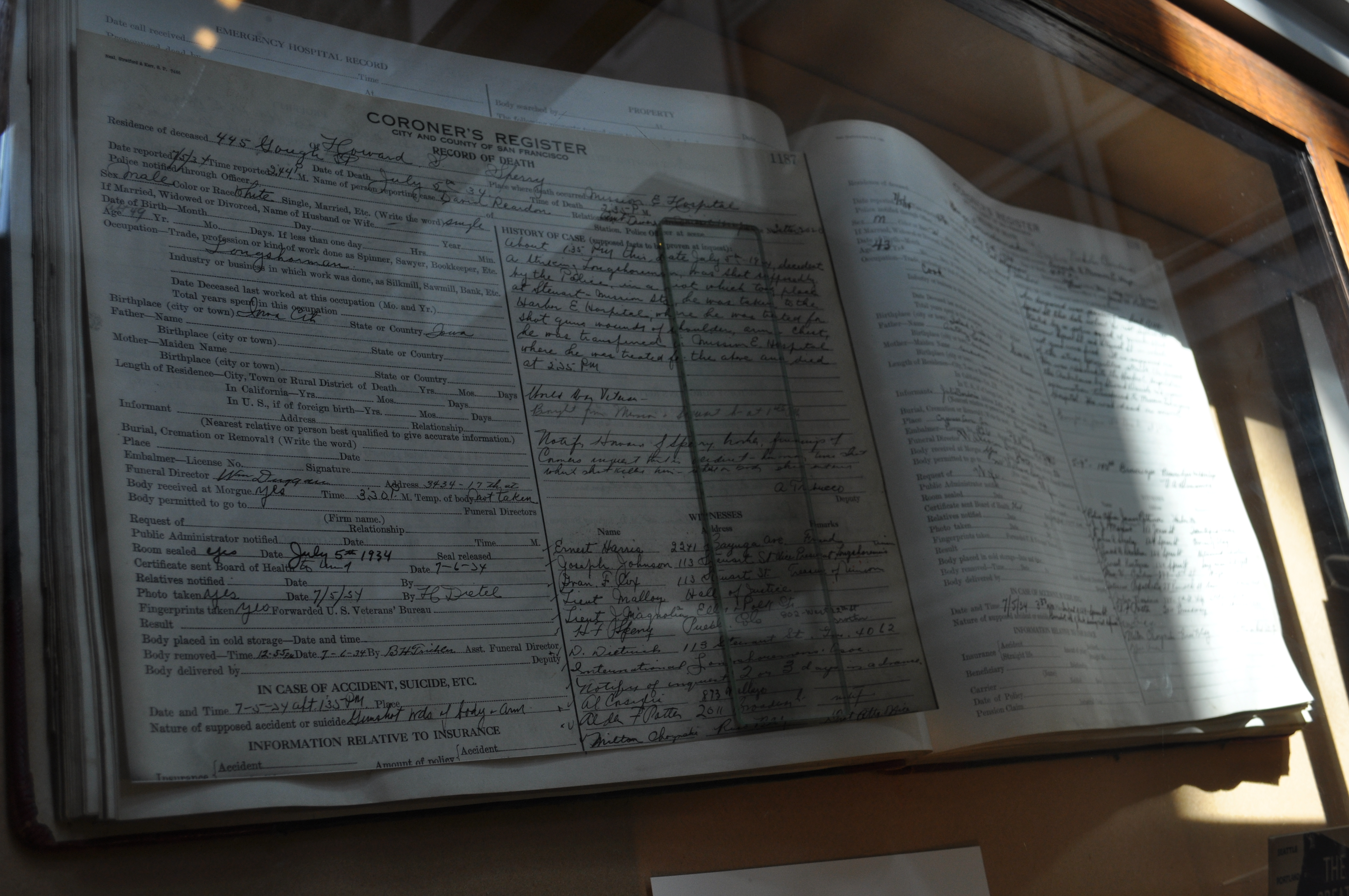
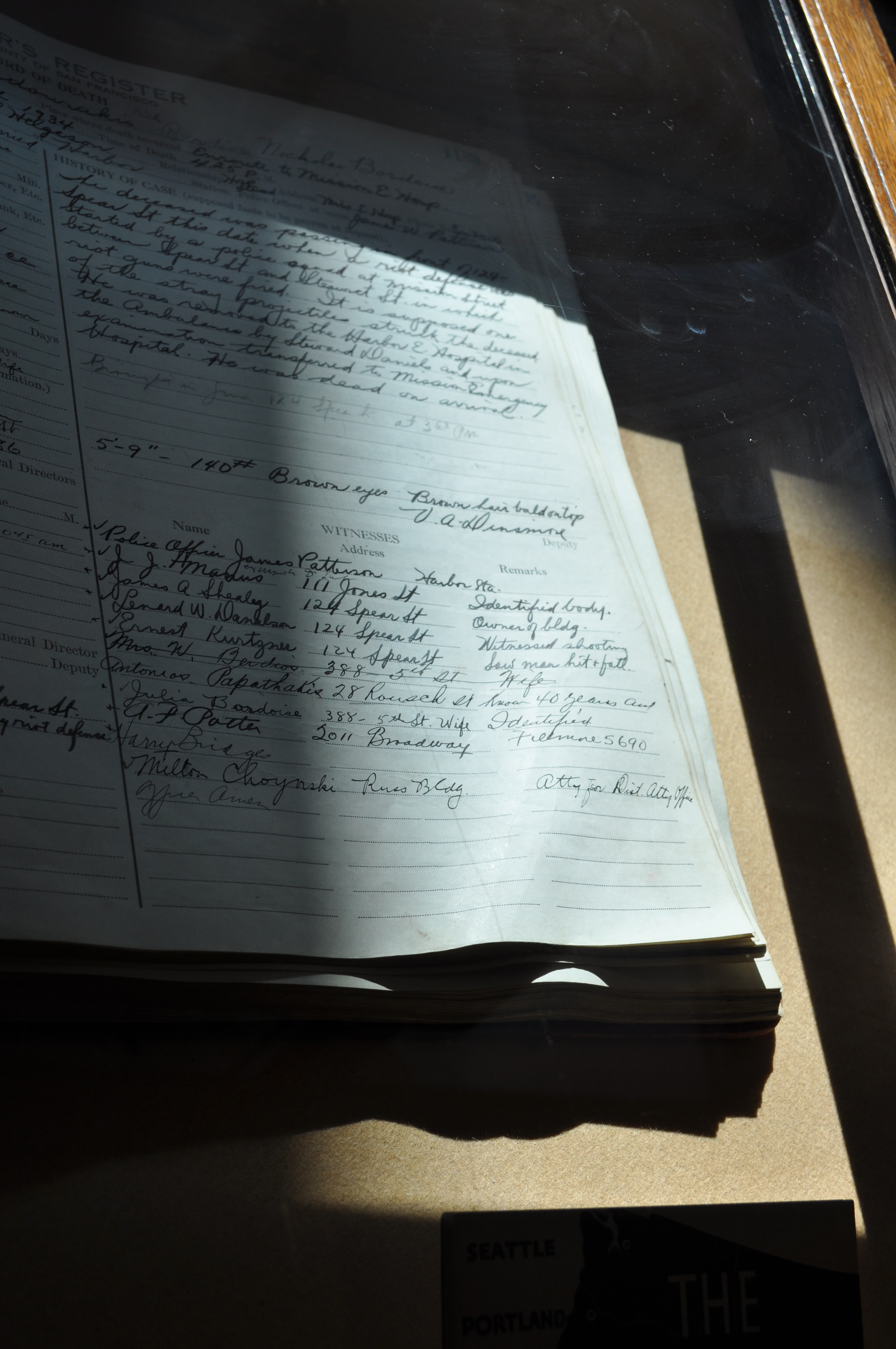
San Francisco Coroner's Records of Death for Howard Sperry and Nicolas Bordoise

After a quiet Fourth of July, the employers' organization, the Industrial Association, tried to open the port of San Francisco even further on Thursday, July 5. As spectators watched from Rincon Hill, the police shot tear gas canisters into the crowd, then followed with a charge by mounted police Picketers threw the canisters and rocks back at the police, who charged again, sending the picketers into retreat. Each side then refortified and took stock.

The events took an even more violent turn that afternoon, as hostilities resumed outside of the ILA strike kitchen. Eyewitness accounts differ on the exact events that transpired next. According to some witnesses, a group of strikers first surrounded a police car and attempted to tip it over, prompting the police to fire shotguns in the air, and then revolvers at the crowd. Other eyewitness accounts claim that police officers started shooting in the direction of the strikers, provoking strikers to defend themselves. Policemen fired a shotgun into the crowd, striking three men in intersection of Steuart and Mission streets. One of the men, Howard Sperry, a striking longshoreman, later died of his wounds. Another man, Charles Olsen, was also shot but later recovered from his wounds. A third man, Nick Bordoise – a Greek by birth (originally named Nick Counderakis) who was an out of work member of the cook's union volunteering at the ILA strike kitchen – was shot but managed to make his way around the corner onto Spear Street, where he was found several hours later. Like Sperry, he died at the hospital.

Strikers immediately cordoned off the area where the two picketers had been shot, laying flowers and wreaths around it. Police arrived to remove the flowers and drive off the picketers minutes later. Once the police left, the strikers returned, replaced the flowers and stood guard over the spot. Though Sperry and Bordoise had been shot several blocks apart, this spot became synonymous with the memory of the two slain men and "Bloody Thursday".

As strikers carried wounded picketers into the ILA union hall police fired on the hall and lobbed tear gas canisters at nearby hotels. At this point someone reportedly called the union hall to ask "Are you willing to arbitrate now?".

Under orders from California Governor Frank Merriam, the California National Guard moved in that evening to patrol the waterfront. Similarly, federal soldiers of the United States Army stationed at the Presidio were placed on alert. The picketers pulled back, unwilling to take on armed soldiers in an uneven fight, and trucks and trains began moving without interference. Bridges asked the San Francisco Labor Council to meet that Saturday, July 7, to authorize a general strike. The Alameda County Central Labor Council in Oakland considered the same action. Teamsters in both San Francisco and Oakland voted to strike, over the objections of their leaders, on Sunday, July 8.

== Funerals and general strike ==
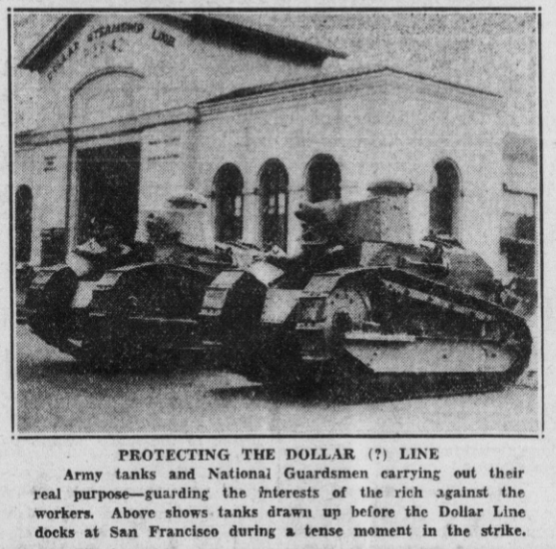
"Protecting The Dollar Line," Daily Worker; July 21, 1934

The following day, several thousand strikers, families and sympathizers took part in a funeral procession down Market Street, stretching more than a mile and a half, for Nicholas Bordoise and Howard Sperry, the two persons killed on "Bloody Thursday". The police were wholly absent from the scene. The march made an enormous impact on San Franciscans, making a general strike, which had formerly been "the visionary dream of a small group of the most radical workers, became ... a practical and realizable objective." After dozens of Bay Area unions voted for a general strike over the next few days, the San Francisco Labor Council voted on July 14 to call a general strike. The Teamsters had already been out for two days by that point.

San Francisco Mayor Angelo Rossi declared a state of emergency. Some federal officials, particularly Secretary of Labor Frances Perkins, were more skeptical. Roosevelt later recalled that some persons were urging him to steer the USS Houston, which was carrying him to Hawaii, "into San Francisco Bay, all flags flying and guns double-shotted, and end the strike." Roosevelt rejected the suggestion.

The general strike began on the 16th, involving some 150,000 workers. On the 17th the police arrested more than 300 "radicals, subversives, and communists" while systematically smashing furniture and equipment of organizations related to the strike; the same day, General Hugh S. Johnson as head of the National Recovery Administration spoke at UC Berkeley to denounce the general strike as "a menace to the government".

The strike lasted four days. Non-union truck drivers joined the first day; the movie theaters and night clubs closed down. While food deliveries continued with the permission of the strike committee, many small businesses closed, posting signs in support of the strikers. Reports that unions in Portland and Seattle would also begin general strikes picked up currency.

== End of the strike ==
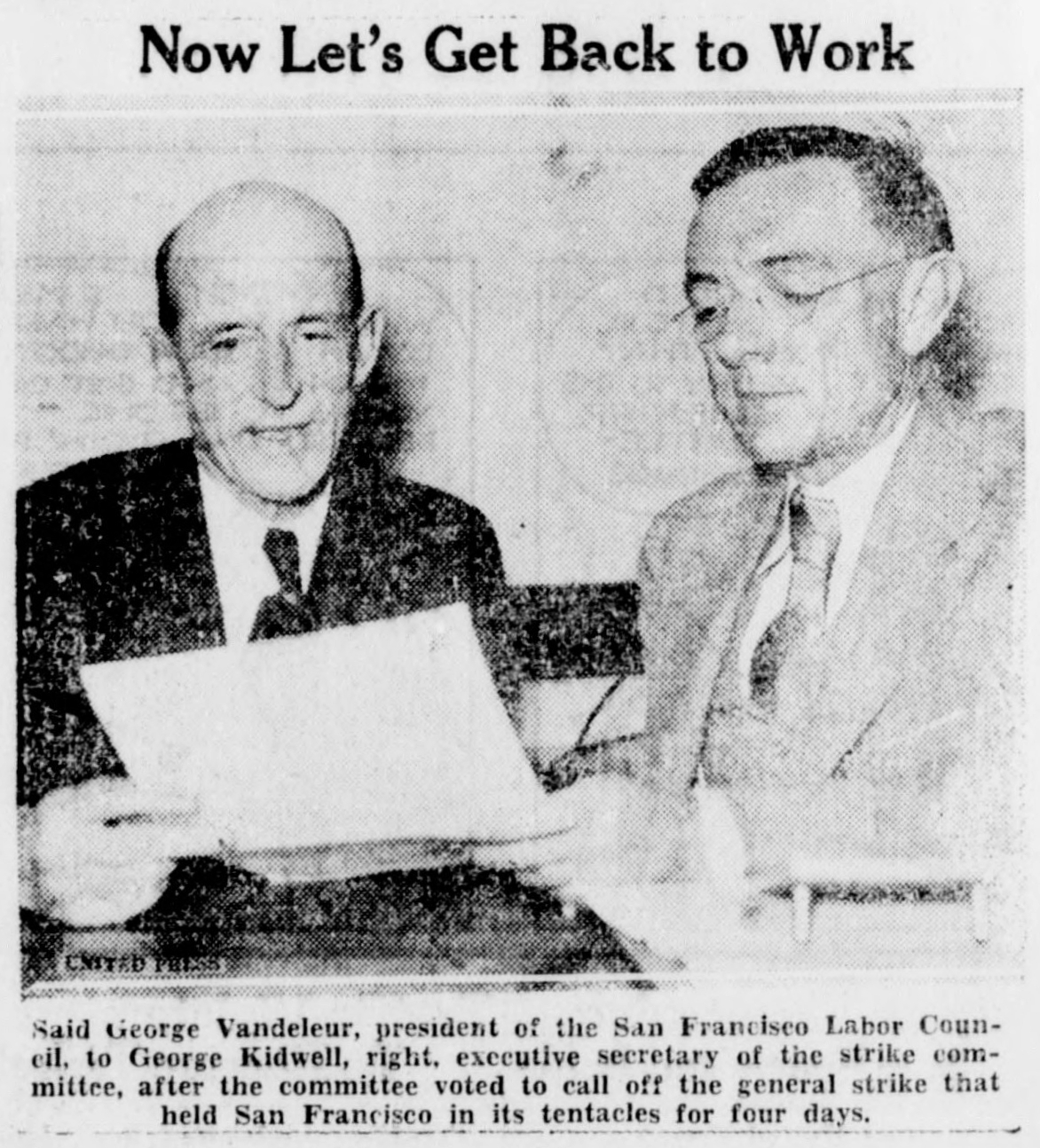
Clipping from the Madera Tribune, published July 21, 1934, featuring Edward D. Vandeleur (left) and George G. Kidwell, who brought the strike to an end

The calling of a general strike had an unexpected result: it gave the General Strike Committee, whose makeup was far less militant than the longshoremen's strike committee, effective control over the maritime strike itself. Its leaders were George G. Kidwell of the Bakery Wagon Drivers' Union, Michael Casey of the Teamsters, and Edward D. Vandeleur of the San Francisco Labor Council, all of whom opposed the calls by Bridges for a general strike. They used their positions on the committee to defuse class divisions and guide both sides toward arbitration. After four days, the Labor Council voted to end the strike. When it did so, it also recommended that the unions accept arbitration of all disputed issues. When the National Longshore Board put the employer's proposal to arbitrate to a vote of striking longshoremen, it passed in every port except Everett, Washington.

That, however, left the striking seamen in the lurch: the employers had refused to arbitrate with the ISU unless it first won elections on the fleets on strike. While Bridges, who had preached solidarity among all maritime workers and scorned arbitration, apologized to the seamen for the longshoremen's vote, the President of the ISU urged them to hold out and to burn their "fink books", the membership records of the company union to which they had been forced to pay dues.

On July 17, 1934, the California National Guard blocked both ends of Jackson Street from Drumm to Front with machine gun mounted trucks to assist vigilante raids, protected by SFPD, on the headquarters of the Marine Workers' Industrial Union and the ILA soup kitchen at 84 Embarcadero. Moving on, the Workers' Ex-Servicemen's League's headquarters on Howard between Third and Fourth was raided, leading to 150 arrests and the complete destruction of the facilities. The employer's group, the Industrial Association, had agents riding with the police. Further raids were carried out at the Workers' Open Forum at 1223 Fillmore street and the Western Worker building opposite City Hall that contained a bookstore and the main offices of the Communist Party, which was thoroughly destroyed. Attacks were also perpetrated on the 121 Haight Street Workers' School and the Mission Workers' Neighborhood House at 741 Valencia Street. A police spokesperson suggested that "maybe the Communists staged the raids themselves for publicity".

General Hugh S. Johnson, then head of the National Recovery Administration, gave a speech urging responsible labor leaders to "run these subversive influences out from its ranks like rats". A lawyer for the American Civil Liberties Union was kidnapped and beaten, while vigilantes seized thirteen radicals in San Jose and turned them over to the sheriff of an adjoining county, who transported them to another county. In Hayward in Alameda County someone erected a scaffold in front of the city hall with a noose and a sign stating "Reds beware" In Piedmont, an upscale community surrounded by Oakland on all sides, the chief of police prepared for a reported attack by strikers on the homes of wealthy ship-owners.

== Aftermath ==
While some of the most powerful people in San Francisco considered the strike's denouement to be a victory for the employers, many longshoremen and seamen did not. Spontaneous strikes over grievances and workplace conditions broke out as strikers returned to their jobs, with longshoremen and teamsters supporting their demands. Employers conceded many of these battles, giving workers even more confidence in demanding that employers lighten unbearably heavy loads. Longshoremen also began dictating other terms, fining members who worked more than the ceiling of 120 hours per month, filing charges against a gang boss for "slandering colored brothers" and forcing employers to fire strikebreakers. Other unions went further: the Marine Firemen proposed to punish any member who bought a Hearst newspaper.

The arbitration award issued on October 12, 1934, cemented the ILA's power. While the award put the operation of the hall in the hands of a committee of union and employer representatives, the union was given the power to select the dispatcher. Since longshoremen were prepared to walk out if an employer did not hire a worker dispatched from the hall, the ILA soon controlled hiring on the docks. The employers complained that the union wanted to "sovietize" the waterfront. Workers complained that the employers were exploiting them for cheap labor and forcing them to work in unsafe conditions without reasonable safety measures.

The union soon utilized the "quickie strike" tactic to force many concessions from employers such as safer working conditions and better pay. Similarly, even though an arbitrator held that the 1935 Agreement prohibited sympathy strikes, the union's members nonetheless refused to cross other unions' picket lines. Longshoremen also refused to handle "hot cargo" destined for non-union warehouses that the union was attempting to organize. The ISU acquired similar authority over hiring, despite the philosophical objection of the union's own officers to hiring halls. The ISU used this power to drive strikebreakers out of the industry.

Before the strike, Black workers had managed to gain some leadership positions in the ILA's Seattle local. Afterward, credit for the strike's success was shared between Black and white longshoremen, and Black members gained further leadership positions. This contributed to Black longshoremen becoming some of the most powerful advocates for civil rights in the Western U.S.

The rift between the seamen's and longshoremen's unions deepened and became more complex in the succeeding years, as Bridges continually fought with the Sailors' Union of the Pacific over labor and political issues, many of which came to the forefront in the 1936 Pacific Coast Maritime Strike two years later. The West Coast district of the ILA broke off from the International in 1937 to form the International Longshoremen's Union, later renamed the International Longshoremen's and Warehousemen's Union after the union's "march inland" to organize warehouse workers, then renamed the International Longshore and Warehouse Union (ILWU) in recognition of the number of women members.

The arbitration award also gave longshoremen a raise to ninety-five cents ($23 in 2025 dollars) an hour for straight time work, just shy of the dollar an hour it demanded during the strike. It was also awarded a contract that applied up and down the West Coast. The strike also prompted union organizer Carmen Lucia to organize the Department Store Workers Union and the Retail Clerks Association in San Francisco.

== Legacy ==
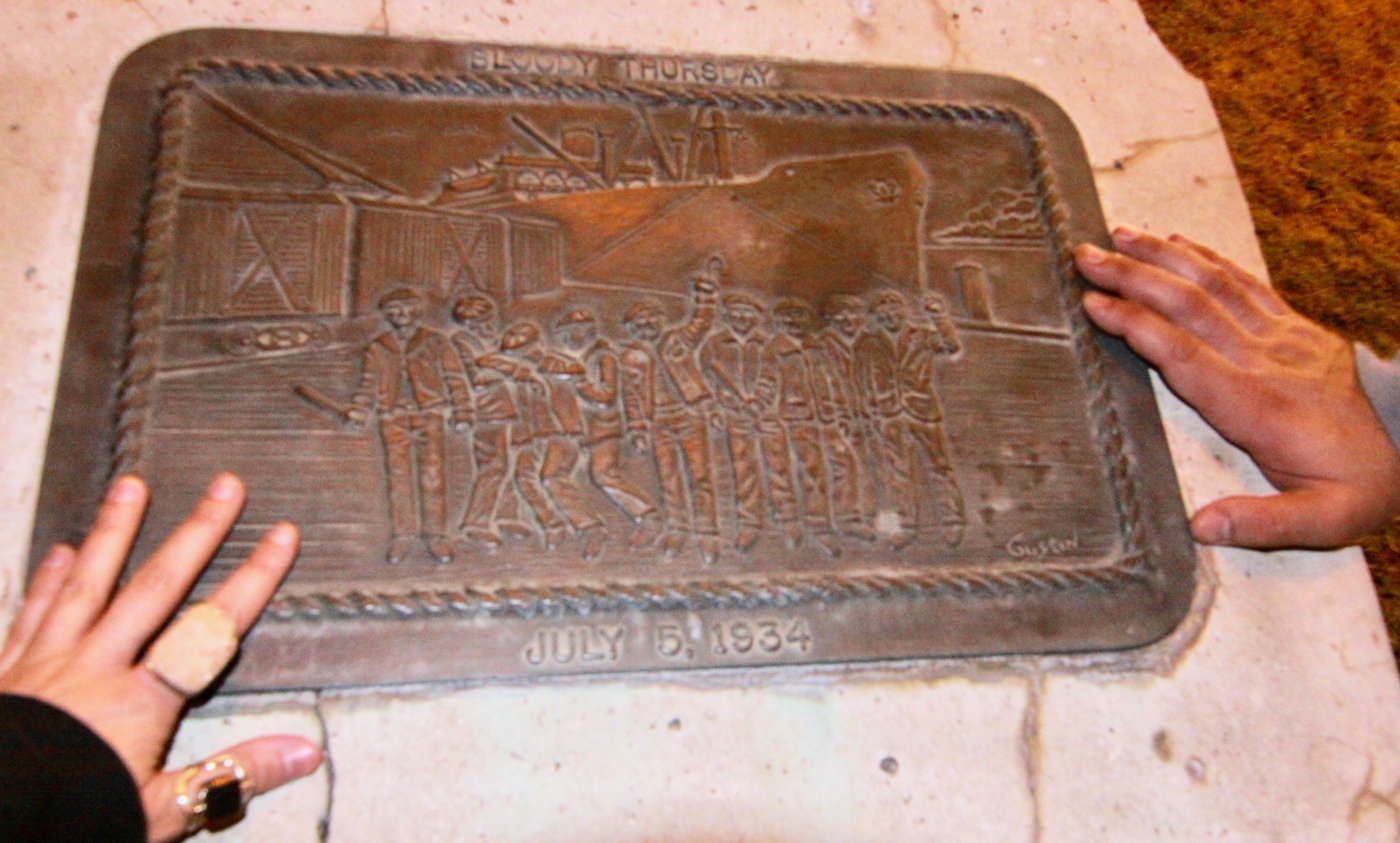
Plaque in front of the San Pedro Municipal Building, commemorating Bloody Thursday.

The ILWU continues to recognize "Bloody Thursday" by shutting down all West Coast ports every July 5 and honoring Nick Bordoise, Howard Sperry and all of the other workers killed by police during the strike. The ILWU has frequently stopped work for political protests against, among other things, Italy's invasion of Ethiopia, fascist intervention in the Spanish Civil War, South Africa's system of apartheid and the Iraq War.

Sam Kagel, the last surviving member of the original union steering committee, died on May 21, 2007, at the age of 98.

Bloody Thursday, a documentary film that told the story of the strike, was broadcast on PBS stations across the nation and was awarded a Los Angeles Area Emmy for best historical film in 2010.

== See also ==
- US Textile Workers' Strike of 1934
- Strikes in the United States in the 1930s
- Harry Bridges
- History of the west coast of North America
- List of worker deaths in United States labor disputes
- List of US strikes by size

== Sources ==
- * Nelson, Bruce (1990). Workers on the Waterfront: Seamen, Longshoremen, and Unionism in the 1930s. University of Illinois Press. ISBN 9780252061448.
- Mike, Quin (1949). The Big Strike. Olema, Calif., Olema Pub. Co.
