= Herbert B. Powell =

United States Army general (1903–1998)

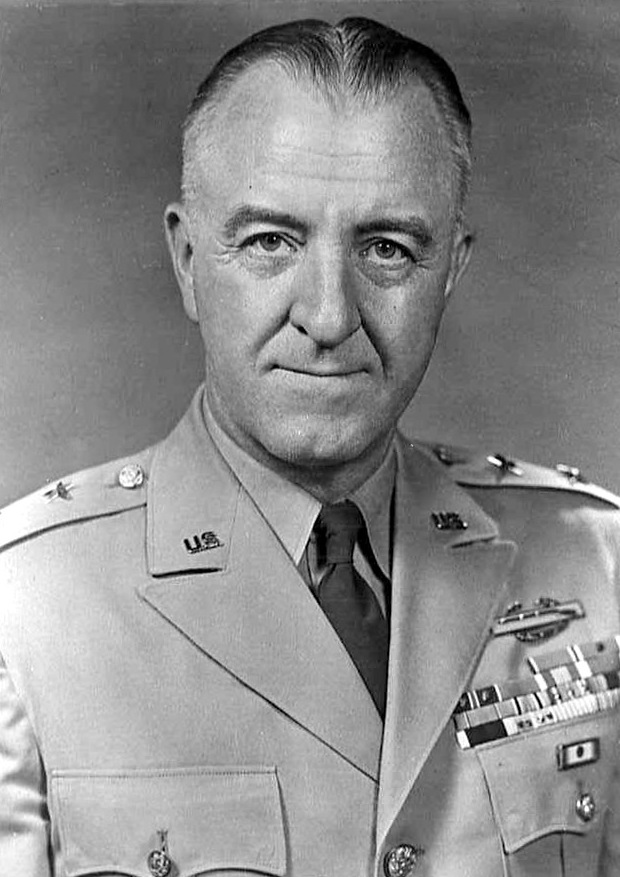
- Major General Herbert B. Powell c. 1956
- Born: 13 July 1903; Monmouth, Oregon, U.S.
- Died: 3 April 1998 (aged 94); Williamsburg, Virginia, U.S.
- Burial place: Arlington National Cemetery
- Military career
- Allegiance: United States
- Branch: United States Army
- Service years: 1919–1963
- Rank: General
- Commands: United States Continental Army Command; Third United States Army; United States Army Pacific; 25th Infantry Division; 17th Infantry Regiment
- Conflicts: World War II; Korean War
- Awards: Distinguished Service Cross; Army Distinguished Service Medal; Legion of Merit (2); Bronze Star Medal (3); Purple Heart; Air Medal
- Other work: United States Ambassador to New Zealand and Samoa (1963–67)

Herbert Butler Powell (13 July 1903 – 3 April 1998) was a United States Army general and diplomat. He served as Commanding General of the United States Continental Army Command, and was later United States Ambassador to New Zealand and Samoa.

== Early life and career ==
Powell was born in Monmouth, Oregon, on 13 July 1903. He joined the Oregon National Guard as a private in 1919, rising to the rank of sergeant. He received his commission in 1926 after graduating from the University of Oregon with a degree in journalism. Powell graduated from the Command and General Staff School in 1941.

During World War II, Powell was chief of staff of the 75th Infantry Division, fighting in Europe. After the war, he graduated from the National War College in 1949. In the Korean War, Powell commanded the only American regiment, the 17th Infantry, to reach the Yalu River. Powell later commanded the 25th Infantry Division at Schofield Barracks, where he was known as the "Soldier's General." He briefly commanded the United States Army Pacific for three months, from April to July 1956, as an interim commander for General Blackshear M. Bryan. He later received promotions to lieutenant general and general. Subsequent commands included Commanding General for the Third United States Army in Fort McPherson, Georgia, and Commanding General of the United States Continental Army Command, Fort Monroe, Virginia.

Other significant duties for Powell were Commandant of the United States Army Infantry School at Fort Benning, Georgia, and Deputy Commanding General for Reserve Forces at Fort Monroe. After his retirement in 1963, President John F. Kennedy appointed him the United States Ambassador to New Zealand and Samoa, a post he filled from 1963 to 1967. He died on April 3, 1998, in a nursing home in Williamsburg, Virginia. Powell was buried at Arlington National Cemetery beside his first wife Beryl King Powell (1904–1989) on 10 April 1998. He had remarried with Grace Eudora Streety Tuggle, the widow of an Army colonel.

== Awards and decorations ==
Powell's awards and decorations include the Distinguished Service Cross, the Army Distinguished Service Medal, the Legion of Merit with oak leaf cluster, the Bronze Star Medal with two oak leaf clusters, the Purple Heart, and the Air Medal. He was also a qualified army aviator. Powell was inducted posthumously into the University of Oregon School of Journalism and Communication Hall of Achievement on 14 October 2004.

Military offices
Preceded by Robert F. Sink	Commanding General of the Third United States Army; 1960	Succeeded by Thomas J. H. Trapnell
Diplomatic posts
Preceded by Anthony B. Akers	United States Ambassador to New Zealand; 1963–1967	Succeeded by John F. Henning
Preceded by Anthony B. Akers	United States Ambassador to Samoa; 1963–1967	Succeeded by John F. Henning
