= Michael Casey (unionist) =

American labor leader, politician (1860–1937)

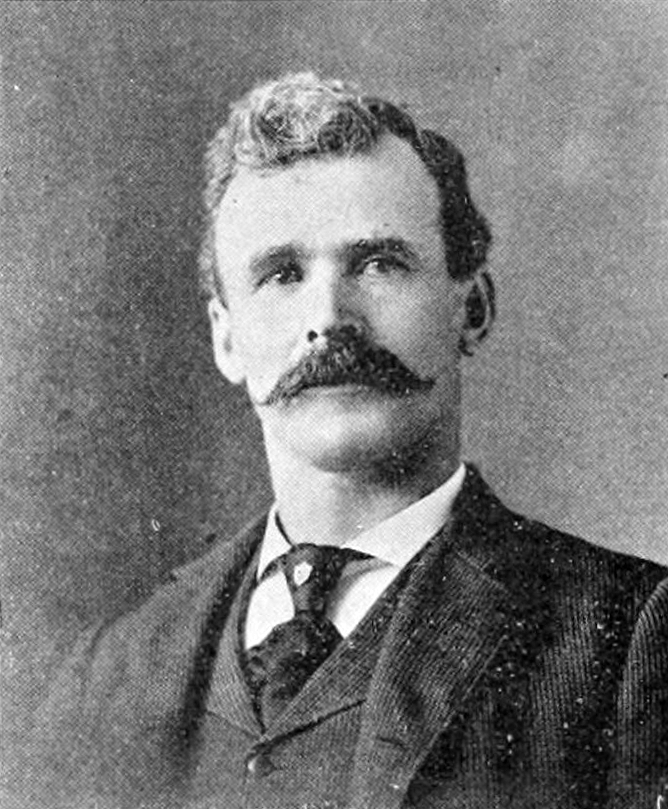
- Casey c. 1902

President of the San Francisco Board of Public Works
- In office January 10, 1910 – January 8, 1913
- Preceded by: Charles A. Day
- Succeeded by: Adolph Judell
- In office August 30, 1907 – January 8, 1909
- Preceded by: George F. Duffey
- Succeeded by: Charles A. Day
- In office January 8, 1903 – January 8, 1904
- Preceded by: George H. Mendell
- Succeeded by: Herbert Schmitz

Member of the San Francisco Board of Public Works
- In office August 29, 1907 – January 8, 1913
- Appointed by: Edward Robeson Taylor; P. H. McCarthy
- Preceded by: George F. Duffey
- Succeeded by: Adolph Judell
- In office January 8, 1902 – January 8, 1905
- Appointed by: Eugene Schmitz
- Preceded by: A. B. Maguire
- Succeeded by: Edward H. Aigeltinger

Personal details
- Born: September 21, 1860 Elphin, County Roscommon, Ireland
- Died: May 2, 1937 (aged 76) San Francisco, California, U.S.
- Party: Union Labor
- Occupation: Labor leader, politician
- Nickname: "Bloody Mike"

Michael Casey (September 21, 1860 – May 2, 1937), nicknamed "Bloody Mike", was an Irish-born American labor leader and politician who served as president of the San Francisco Teamsters' Union from 1900 until his death in 1937. He also served as a member of the San Francisco Board of Public Works from 1902 to 1905 and again from 1907 to 1913, serving several terms as president of the Board.

== Life and career ==
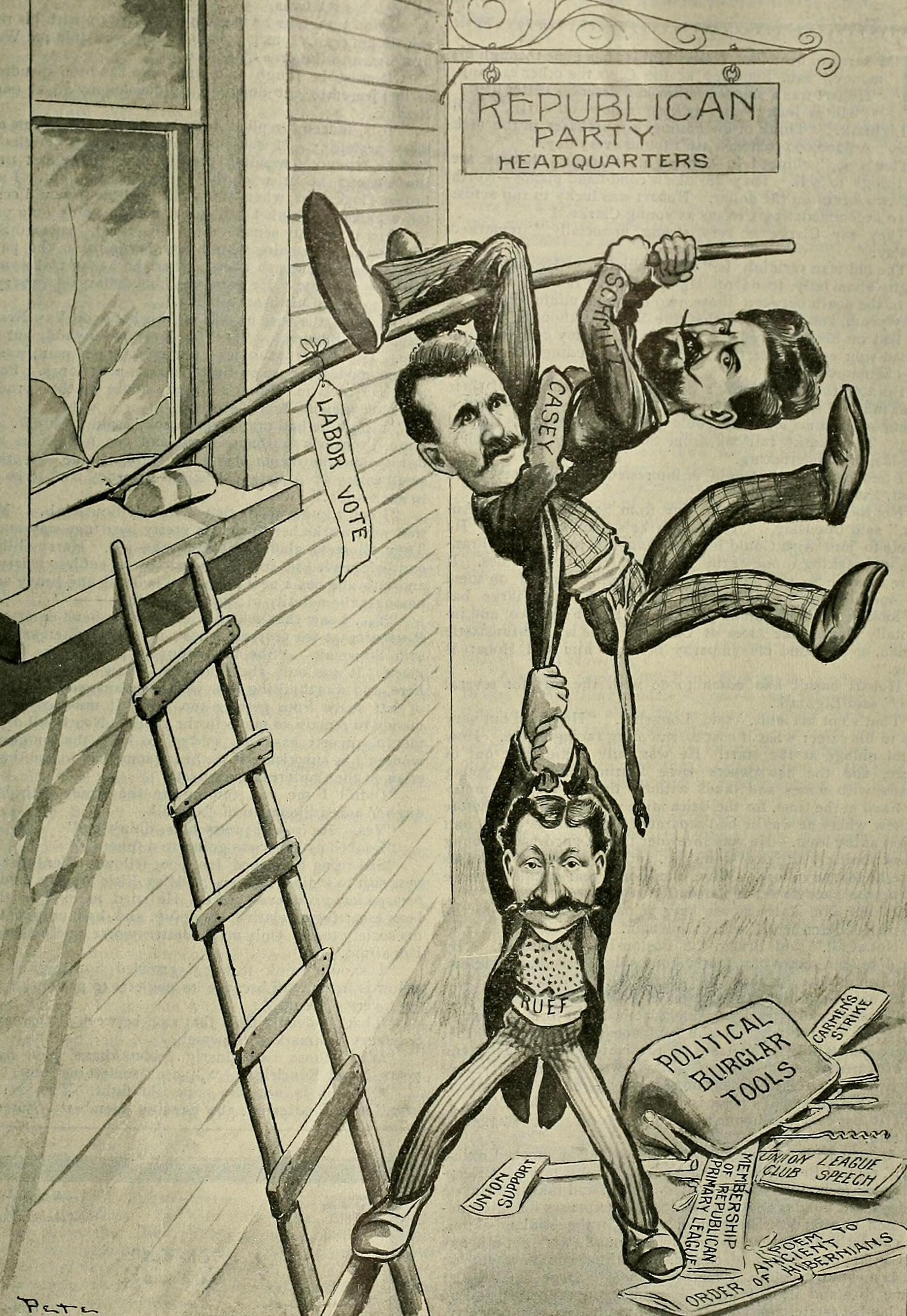
"Trying To Break In," a political cartoon published in The Wasp depicting Casey, Eugene Schmitz, and Abe Ruef attempting to use the labor vote to infiltrate the Republican Party, May 10, 1902

Born in Elphin, County Roscommon, Ireland, Casey immigrated with his family to the United States in 1871. When he was 12, they settled in San Francisco. From 1889, he worked as a teamster, driving a team of horses. In 1900, he and John P. McLaughlin founded a local of the Team Drivers' International Union in the city. The following year, he led the union through a major strike, during which he was nicknamed "Bloody Mike" by opponents, a title which he embraced.

In 1902, Casey was appointed a commissioner of the city's Board of Public Works by mayor Eugene Schmitz, serving until 1905, and was reappointed by mayors Edward Robeson Taylor and P. H. McCarthy, serving again from 1907 to 1913. During these terms he served as its president from 1903 to 1904, 1907 to 1909, and 1910 to 1913. He was the leader of the anti-Schmitz faction of the Union Labor Party. Eventually, he became disillusioned with local politics, and decided to focus his time on labor unionism.

In 1903, the Team Drivers merged into the new International Brotherhood of Teamsters, which appointed Casey as its West Coast organizer. In 1912, he won election as second vice-president of the national union. In this role, he opposed strikes, and negotiated an end to the 1934 West Coast waterfront strike. He died in 1937, still serving as president of the local Teamsters.

Trade union offices
Preceded by Frank Farrington; William Hutcheson	American Federation of Labor delegate to the Trades Union Congress; 1927; With: John Coefield	Succeeded by William B. Fitzgerald; Michael F. Greene
