= Edward D. Vandeleur =

American labor leader (1886–1943)

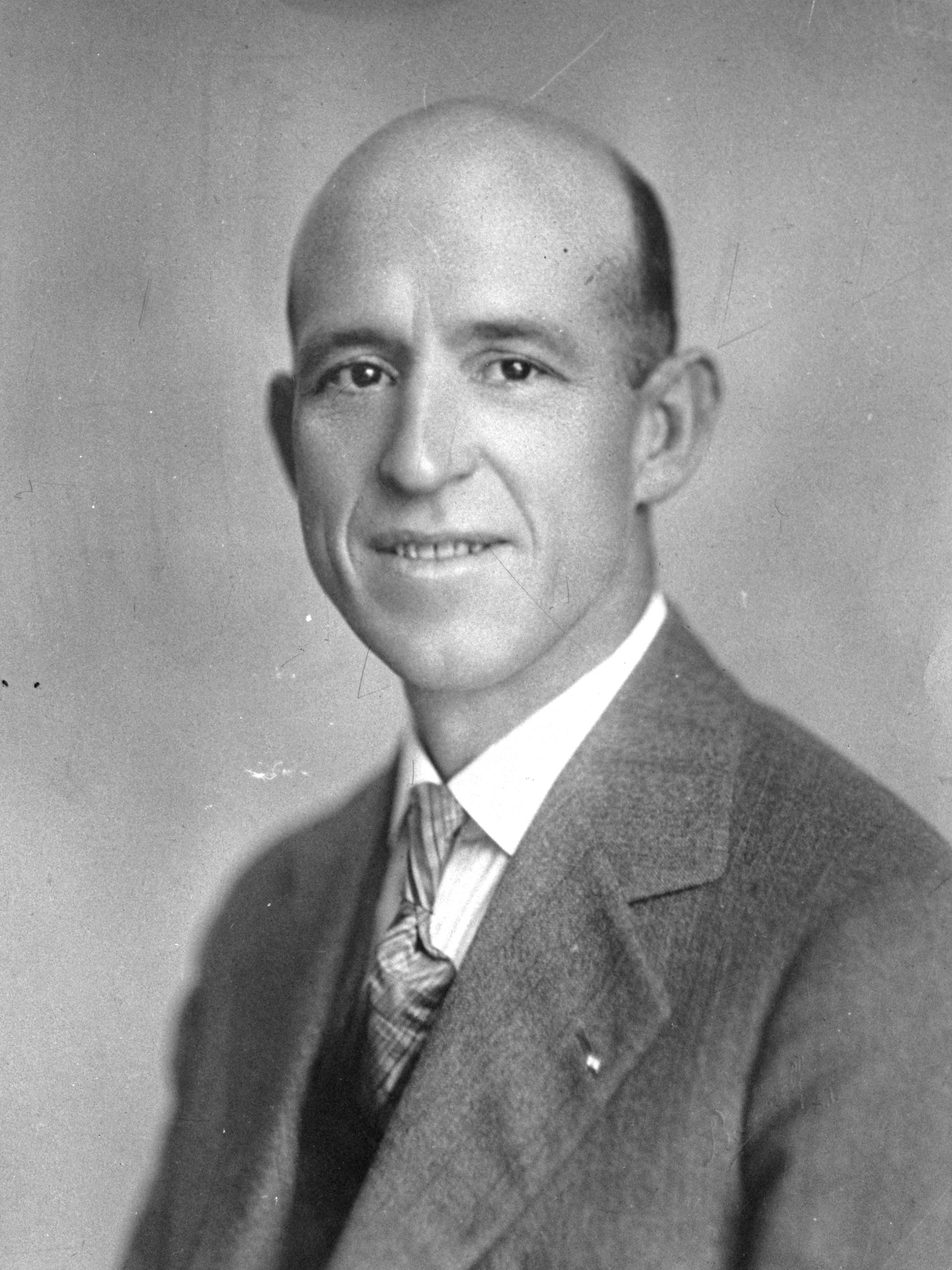
- Vandeleur c. 1928

Executive Secretary-Treasurer of the California Labor Federation
- In office March 23, 1936 – October 5, 1943
- Preceded by: Paul Scharrenberg
- Succeeded by: C. J. Haggerty

President of the California Labor Federation
- In office September 20, 1934 – March 23, 1936
- Preceded by: A. W. Hoch
- Succeeded by: James Edward Hopkins

Personal details
- Born: Edward Dexter Vandeleur; July 13, 1886 Yountville, California, U.S.
- Died: October 5, 1943 (aged 57) San Francisco, California, U.S.
- Spouse(s): Carol Collins (divorced) Gladys Sullivan (m. 1941)
- Children: 2
- Occupation: Labor leader
- Known for: Chairman of the General Strike Committee during the 1934 West Coast waterfront strike

Edward Dexter "Van" Vandeleur (July 13, 1886 – October 5, 1943) was an American labor union leader. He served as President of the California Labor Federation from 1934 to 1936, then as Executive Secretary-Treasurer from 1936 to 1943.

Vandeleur first came to San Francisco in 1915, where he found work as a carman for the Municipal Railway. The next year he was elected president of the Carmen's Union, a position he held on and off again until 1936.

In 1933, Vandeleur was elected president of the San Francisco Labor Council. The next year, he was Chairman of the General Strike Committee during the 1934 West Coast waterfront strike, which he negotiated an end to.

During his career, Vandeleur belonged to the "conservative" wing of organized labor, and was a firm anti-communist.

Trade union offices
Preceded by A. W. Hoch	President of the California Labor Federation; 1934–1936	Succeeded by James Edward Hopkins
Preceded by Paul Scharrenberg	Secretary-Treasurer of the California Labor Federation; 1936–1943	Succeeded by C. J. Haggerty
