= California Department of Industrial Relations =

Department of Industrial Relations
Department overview
- Formed: July 29, 1927
- Headquarters: Elihu M. Harris State Office Building, Oakland, California
- Parent department: Labor and Workforce Development Agency
- Website: www.dir.ca.gov

The California Department of Industrial Relations (DIR) is a department of the government of the state of California which was initially created in 1927. The department is currently part of the Cabinet-level California Labor and Workforce Development Agency, and headquartered at the Elihu M. Harris State Office Building in Oakland.

== History ==
The department was the California State Legislature's second attempt to reorganize and consolidate state government agencies with jurisdiction over labor and employment issues.

In 1921, the legislature created the California Department of Labor and Industrial Relations. It consisted of the existing Industrial Accident Commission, the Commission of Immigration and Housing, the Industrial Welfare Commission, and the Bureau of Labor Statistics. However, it was "a department in name only" because the new law failed to authorize the appointment of a "central executive head" and failed to actually make its components subordinate to the department. It was merely a way to make the leaders of its components meet regularly "only to coordinate their activities and prevent duplication of effort".

On May 12, 1927, the legislature enacted a law which created the California Department of Industrial Relations as a real department for the first time. This law took effect on July 29, 1927. It expressly placed the new department under the supervision of a director and made the chairman of the Industrial Accident Commission the ex officio director.

Some of its components were later moved into separate departments or dissolved.

In 1935, the state employment agencies (originally created in 1915) were transferred to the new Department of Employment, the ancestor of the modern California Employment Development Department. The department had a Division of Immigration and Housing which had evolved from an earlier agency established in 1912. The immigrant aid program was repealed in 1945, and the remaining Division of Housing was transferred into the California Department of Housing and Community Development in 1965.

=== List of Directors ===
- John A. McGilvray (1927–1928)
- Will J. French (1928–1933)
- Timothy A. Reardon (1933–1939)
- George G. Kidwell (1939–1943)
- Paul Scharrenberg (1943–1955)
- Ernest B. Webb (1955–1958)
- Edward P. Park (1958–1959)
- John F. Henning (1959–1962)
- Ernest B. Webb (1962–1967)
- Albert C. Beeson (1967–1969)
- Peter Weinberger (1969)
- William C. Hern (1969–1972)
- H. Edward White (1972–1975)
- Donald Vial (1975–1983)
- Ronald Rinaldi (1983–1991)
- Lloyd Aubry (1991–1997)
- John C. Duncan (1997–1999)
- Steve Smith (1999–c. 2004)
- John C. Duncan (2007–2011)
- Christine Baker (2011–2019)
- Katrina Hagen (2020–2025)
- Jennifer Osborn (2025–Present)

== Structure ==
Today, the DIR's major components are the Commission on Health and Safety and Workers' Compensation, the Division of Apprenticeship Standards, the Division of Labor Standards Enforcement, the Division of Occupational Safety and Health, and the Division of Workers' Compensation.

DIR also includes the Industrial Welfare Commission, the Office of Self Insurance Plans, the Occupational Safety and Health Standards Board, and the Occupational Safety and Health Appeals Board.

=== Division of Labor Standards Enforcement ===
The Division of Labor Standards Enforcement (DLSE), known also as the Labor Commissioner's Office, enforces provisions of the state Labor Code, such as the overtime, minimum wage and break laws and various retaliation laws, amongst others. The Division both investigates and adjudicates these claims, and may obtain a court judgment in order to enforce its decisions. Once the Labor Commissioner has rendered a final decision in a case, parties must file a petition for writ of administrative mandate in the superior court having jurisdiction in order to have the order set aside, or the order becomes final after 45 days.

=== Division of Workers' Compensation ===
The Division of Workers' Compensation (DWC) and the Workers' Compensation Appeals Board (WCAB) are the descendants of the adjudication functions of the old Industrial Accident Commission (IAC). DWC operates 23 district offices throughout the state at which workers' compensation judges (administrative law judges specializing in the adjudication of workers' compensation claims) hear evidence and decide the amount of compensation to which injured employees are entitled. DWC also operates a Special Adjudication Unit, which handles certain liens when the relevant medical provider is currently facing criminal charges. As of 2024, DWC had 195 judges, who heard 259,653 cases that year. Both DWC and WCAB are headquartered at the Hiram W. Johnson State Office Building in the Ronald M. George State Office Complex in San Francisco's Civic Center (which is also home to the San Francisco district office).

DWC judges are subordinate to the seven-member WCAB, to which their decisions may be appealed by way of a petition for reconsideration.

The unusual terminology originates from the fact that the IAC at its creation in 1911 technically had original jurisdiction over all workers' compensation claims. In other words, California's earliest workers' compensation laws were written as if the IAC members themselves sitting collectively as a panel were supposed to hear the evidence and rule upon each individual claim. This made no sense for a government agency whose purpose was to divert adjudication of compensation for virtually all work-related injuries from the state judiciary and do it faster and with less formalities than the courts. (This was a common error in early American workers' compensation legislation and was not unique to California.) The IAC originally convened in two three-member panels which sat, respectively, in San Francisco and Los Angeles.

The IAC was soon overwhelmed by the number of claims relative to its small size. The IAC began to appoint referees and delegated to them the tasks of hearing evidence on claims (that is, sitting individually and not in panels) and preparing unsigned written recommendations, which were then adopted by the IAC panels as if each panel had heard the evidence itself. In 1945, the referees were allowed to sign their recommendations and the recommendations were circulated to the parties in advance of adoption, but were still nonbinding unless and until they were actually adopted by an IAC panel. In 1951, the state legislature fundamentally changed the relationship between the referees and the IAC by enacting a law which provided that the referees' findings, orders, decisions and awards would automatically have the force of law as if made by the IAC itself, unless the IAC granted a petition for reconsideration of a referee's decision made in its name.

After 1951, it became clear that the referees were holding bench trials and the IAC panels were not actually exercising original jurisdiction, but were performing appellate review. In 1966, the state legislature recognized this reality by enacting a law which divided the IAC into the WCAB and the Division of Industrial Accidents, which later evolved into DWC. In 1975, DIR began to informally refer to the referees as judges, and the state legislature made that official by enacting appropriate legislation in 1985 which became effective on January 1, 1986. In 1987, DWC judges were authorized by the state legislature to wear judicial robes.

=== Division of Occupational Safety and Health ===
The Division of Occupational Safety and Health, known as DOSH or Cal/OSHA, supervises occupational safety and health at workplaces throughout the state of California and issues citations to employers found to be in noncompliance.

DOSH's Elevator Unit is responsible for inspecting nearly all elevators in California, with the notable exception of those in Los Angeles. Furthermore, California is one of the few jurisdictions that expressly requires the current operating permit for an elevator to be prominently posted in the elevator car. Thus, by their nature, DOSH's elevator permits (which include the last date of inspection and date of permit expiration) are among the most commonly viewed documents produced by the California state government.
