= California Labor Federation =

U.S. federation of labor unions

California Federation of Labor Unions
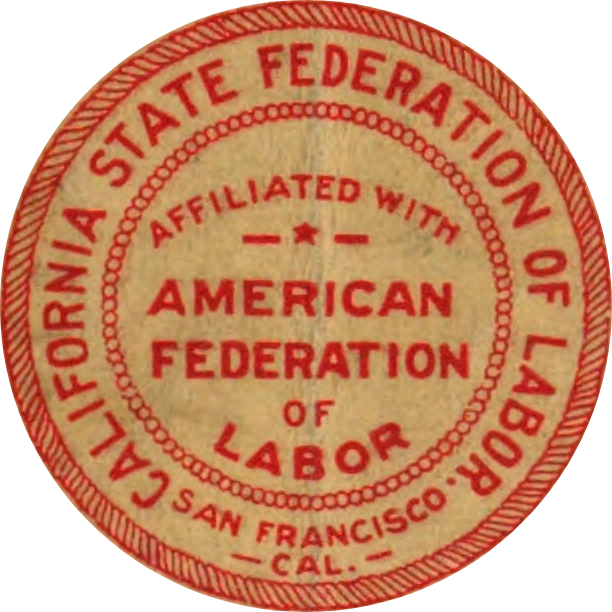
- State Federation of Labor logo c. 1913
- Abbreviation: CLF
- Founded: January 7, 1901; 125 years ago
- Headquarters: Sacramento, California
- Location: United States
- Members: 2,300,000
- President: Lorena Gonzalez
- Secretary-treasurer: Jeffrey Freitas
- Affiliations: AFL–CIO (since 1955); AFL (until 1955)
- Website: calaborfed.org

The California Federation of Labor Unions (CFLU), formerly the California Labor Federation (CLF), is a federation of labor unions in the U.S. state of California. It is an affiliate of the AFL–CIO. Founded in 1901 as the California State Federation of Labor, the CLF has grown to encompass over 1,300 unions representing 2,300,000 workers.

In addition to union organizing, the CFLU is involved in policial campaigning and lobbying.

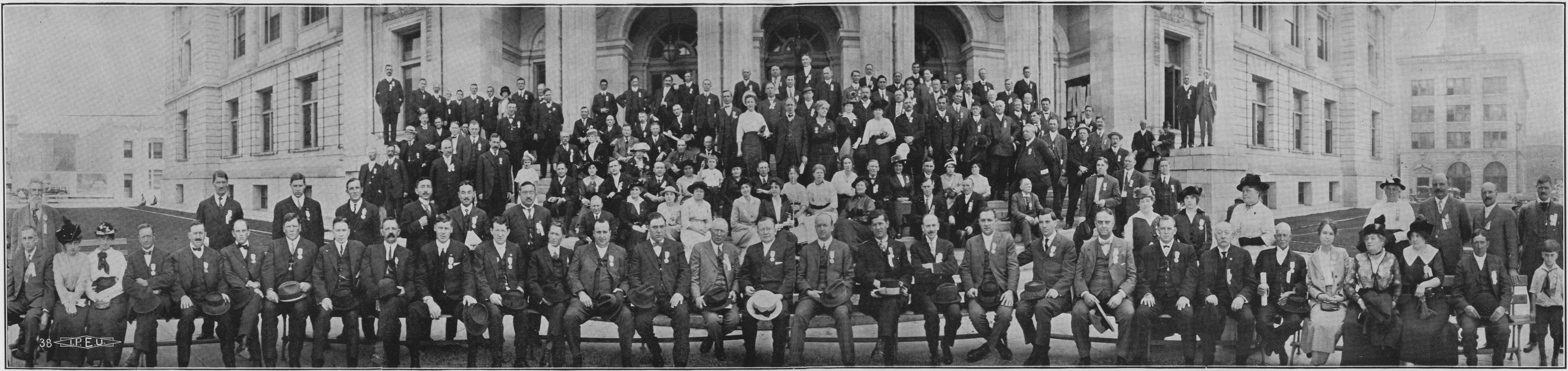
Delegates to the Sixteenth Annual Convention of the California State Federation of Labor in Santa Rosa, 1915

== Leadership ==
=== Executive Secretary-Treasurers ===
1901–1903: Guy Lathrop
1903–1904: George K. Smith
1904–1905: George B. Benham
1905–1906: Frank J. Bonnington
1906–1908: J. H. Bowling
1908–1909: George W. Bell
1909–1936: Paul Scharrenberg
1936–1943: Edward D. Vandeleur
1943–1960: C. J. Haggerty
1960–1970: Thomas L. Pitts
1970–1996: John F. Henning
1996–2022: Art Pulaski
2022–: Lorena Gonzalez (Note: The position of Executive Secretary-Treasurer has since been abolished and replaced by the previously ceremonial position of President.)

=== Presidents ===
1901–1902: C. D. Rogers
1902–1903: John Davidson
1903–1904: James A. Gray
1904–1906: Harry Knox
1906–1907: G. S. Brower
1907–1908: George A. Tracy
1908–1909: A. M. Thompson
1909–1912: D. D. Sullivan
1912–1916: Daniel P. Haggerty
1916–1921: Daniel C. Murphy
1921–1924: Seth R. Brown
1924–1926: Roe H. Baker
1926–1928: John F. Dalton
1928–1930: W. P. Stanton
1930–1934: A. W. Hoch
1934–1936: Edward D. Vandeleur
1936–1937: James Edward Hopkins
1937–1943: C. J. Haggerty
1943–1946: Anthony L. Noriega
1946–1947: Charles W. Real
1947–1950: John F. Shelley
1950–1960: Thomas L. Pitts
1960–1996: Albin J. Gruhn
1996–2004: Tom Rankin
2004–2015: Connie Leyva
2015–: Kathryn Lybarger (Note: The previously ceremonial position of President is now the senior leadership position. Lybarger is now 2nd Executive Vice President.)

== See also ==
- Los Angeles County Federation of Labor
- South Bay Labor Council
- Union Labor Party (California)
