= California Division of Occupational Safety and Health =

California state government agency

The Division of Occupational Safety and Health (DOSH, but more commonly known as Cal/OSHA) of the California Department of Industrial Relations is an agency of the Government of California established by the California Occupational Safety & Health Act of 1973.

== Purpose ==
Cal/OSHA's mission is to protect public health and safety through research and regulation related to hazards on the job in California workplaces as well as on elevators, amusement rides, and ski lifts, and related to the use of pressure vessels such as boilers and tanks. Cal/OSHA requires that qualifying organizations create illness and injury prevention programs meant to help identify and eliminate dangers before accidents and illnesses occur.

As of December 22, 2015, Cal/OSHA employed 195 field enforcement officers, 25 of whom received bilingual pay for using a second language at least 10% of the time on the job. The organization offers training materials and paid training time to staff interested in learning other languages and encourages bilingual applicants to apply.

On July 1, 2020, Cal OSHA instituted a new requirement (title 8, section 3441) for agricultural workers. These new standards protect nighttime agricultural workers by mandating class 2 or class 3 hi vis safety gear.

== See also ==
- Occupational Safety and Health Administration, an analogous agency of the United States federal government
