= Harry Ault =

Harry Ault, 1906 (age 23).

Erwin Bratton "Harry" Ault (1883–1961) was an American socialist and trade union activist. He is best remembered as the editor of the Seattle Union Record, the long-running labor weekly (turned daily) published from 1912 to 1928. After termination of the Union Record, Ault worked as a commercial printer for a number of years, before being appointed a deputy U.S. Marshal for Tacoma, Washington, a position which he retained for 15 years.

== Biography ==
=== Early years ===
Erwin Bratton Ault, known to all his contemporaries by the nickname of "Harry", was born October 30, 1883, in Newport, Kentucky, the son of American-born socialist parents. His father worked as a metal polisher and a wool duster.

Anxious to try their hand at establishing a socialist community from the ground up, the Ault family relocated from Kentucky to Washington state in April 1898 to join the "Equality" socialist colony then being launched by the Brotherhood of the Cooperative Commonwealth. At age 17, Harry became the editor of the colony's newspaper, Industrial Freedom, which debuted in May of that same year.

While the "Equality" colony at Edison was not a lasting success, its effort at developing self-reliance and its humanitarian and cooperative vision had a lasting impact on Ault's life. Ault served as editor of Industrial Freedom from 1899 to 1900, at which time he left the group.

In his younger years, Harry Ault supported himself in a variety of trades, including as a gardener, fisherman, blacksmith, machinist, carpenter, and stenographer. Harry Ault was a protégé of radical publisher Hermon F. Titus as a young man.

=== Political career ===
As the child of committed socialists, the young Ault participated in the affairs of the Socialist Labor Party from 1892 to 1898. In 1898 he transferred his allegiance to the new Social Democratic Party of America, headed by labor leader Eugene V. Debs and Wisconsin teacher-turned-newspaper publisher Victor L. Berger. This organization was the forerunner of the Socialist Party of America (SPA), a group which Ault joined at its formation.

Ault left Industrial Freedom to launch a Seattle paper targeted at radical youth called The Young Socialist in 1900. Ault later worked in the National Office of the SPA under Executive Secretary William Mailly, joining Mailly and radical publisher Hermon F. Titus in Toledo, Ohio on the staff of The Socialist, the paper which Titus had started in Seattle in the summer of 1900. In 1906, Ault followed Titus to Caldwell, Idaho for on-the-spot coverage of the politicized trial of the conspiracy to murder former Idaho governor Frank Steunenberg. Clarence Darrow represented radical union leaders Haywood, Pettibone, and Moyer against the charges made as a result of a forced confession. Ault and Titus returned to Seattle with the newspaper in February 1907.

Ault was embroiled in the bitter 1909 State Convention of the Socialist Party of Washington (see Socialist Party of Washington), leaving with the minority left wing delegation headed by Hermon Titus. Although the bolting left wing attempted to form a parallel State Committee and hold a referendum of Washington Socialists to determine the legitimacy of the competing claimants, the governing National Executive Committee of the SPA intervened, ruling the referendum illegal and recognizing the moderate-dominated regular convention.

Thereafter, Ault briefly joined Titus's short-lived new organization, the Wage Workers Party (WWP). Future Communist Party leader William Z. Foster played a leading role in the WWP and later recalled it in his memoirs:

The WWP was sort of a hybrid between the SLP and the IWW. It put in the center of its program its main demand in the fight within the SP. That is, the WWP sought to solve the question of proletarian versus petty bourgeois control of the party by restricting its membership solely to wage workers. It called itself 'a political union,' and its membership provisions specifically excluded 'capitalists, lawyers, preachers, doctors, dentists, detectives, soldiers, factory owners, policemen, superintendents, foremen, professors, and store-keepers.' It barred 'all with power to hire and fire,' but it evaded reference to farmers.

The program placed great stress upon industrial unionism, which in those times meant the IWW. It opposed the formation of a labor party. Its manifest anti-parliamentarianism was but thinly veiled. It outlined no immediate political demands and showed no conception of the role of the party in fighting for such demands ... ; the program contented itself with saying vaguely that it would support all struggles of the workers. The whole stress of the party work was placed upon industrial union action and revolutionary agitation and propaganda for the abolition of the capitalist system.

The Wage Worker Party lasted only a few months, long enough to issue only one edition of its newspaper, The Wage Worker. In the aftermath, Foster and most of his closest associates took the logical step of joining the Industrial Workers of the World, while Harry Ault made his way into the mainstream labor movement.

Ault went to work as the secretary of the Seattle Central Labor Council in 1909, a position which he retained until 1913. In this same interval, Ault founded and edited another ephemeral paper called The Four-hour Day.

In 1910, the Central Labor Council established its own newspaper, a weekly called the Seattle Union Record. Ault took over the role of editor in 1912 and helped to build the paper's readership en route to making it a daily in 1918. Under Ault's leadership, the paper grew from a circulation of 3,000 to 50,000 to a peak of 80,000 in 1919. When Dave Beck took control of the Central Labor Council in 1924, he sold the paper to Ault, who continued the publication until its termination in 1928.

=== Later years ===
After the Union Record folded in 1928, Ault went to work as a commercial printer.

In 1936 he entered the Democratic Congressional primary election in Washington's 1st Congressional District, but he performed poorly, finishing with just over 3400 votes, well behind Warren G. Magnuson and his tally of 37,557. Thus ended Ault's career as a candidate for elected public office.

In 1938, Ault was appointed a deputy U.S. Marshal for Tacoma, Washington, a position which he retained until forced into retirement in 1953.

=== Death and legacy ===
Harry Ault died in Seattle on January 5, 1961.

His papers reside in the Special Collections department of Suzzallo Library at the University of Washington in Seattle.

== Works ==
- Labor's Struggle. (Listed as written by John Downie.) Seattle, WA: J. Downie and M.K. Ault, 1913.
- How to Make Capitalism Work: Containing Memorial "A" to the Congress of the United States. With John Downie. Seattle, WA: Olympic Press, 1936.
- How to Unravel the Snarls in Business. With John Downie. Seattle, WA: Harry E.B. Ault, 1940.

== See also ==
- Seattle General Strike
- Socialist Party of Washington

== External links and archives ==
- The Seattle Union Record (1900–1928), history and digitized copies of the newspaper from The Labor Press Project.
- Harry E.B. Ault papers. 1899–1956. 5.46 cubic feet (13 boxes). At University of Washington Libraries, Special Collections.
