= General Strike of 1919 =

There were several noteworthy general strikes in 1919:

- Seattle General Strike of 1919 in Seattle
- General Strike of 1919 in Spain
- Winnipeg General Strike of 1919 in Winnipeg
