= Seattle General Strike Project =

Multimedia initiative

The Seattle General Strike Project is a multimedia initiative to chronicle the Seattle General Strike. In February 1919, what began as a wage dispute in the city’s shipyard expanded into a week-long walkout involving more than 50,000 workers that heralded a wave of post-war labor unrest and America’s first red scare. The website maintained by the project is one of the foremost collections of primary and academic material on the general strike, and is part of the Pacific Northwest Labor and Civil Rights History Projects program at the University of Washington.

== Content ==
The site is divided into eight sections including an introductory slideshow, photographs, video, oral histories, maps, historical newspaper articles, documents and research reports. The material includes previously unavailable oral histories conducted in 1977 with major participants including David Beck, late President of the International Brotherhood of Teamsters. It also includes an excerpt from a biographical film of Anna Louise Strong, a key strike leader and journalist who became a key figure in the American Left through the 1960s, which shows the only known footage of the strike. In addition to an extensive narrative of the conflict written by Strong and other leaders, the site includes original research reports on the role of Mayor Ole Hanson, the Industrial Workers of the World and the press, among a wide range other topics. Many of these essays also examine Seattle labor history in the years prior to the strike, exploring the climate that precipitated the city shutdown. Additionally, the site showcases a collection of rare photographs and pamphlets from the strike, video of a conference commemorating the 90th anniversary of the strike and curriculum for Washington State history teachers.
