= Pacific Northwest Labor and Civil Rights History Projects =

The Pacific Northwest Labor and Civil Rights History Projects are a series of multimedia public history initiatives. The projects cover a range of themes and subjects in the Northwest and Seattle, with a particular focus on working people and their movements. The effort, particularly the Seattle Civil Rights and Labor History Project, has garnered praise for the breadth of primary and secondary resources made available and its joint creation by academics, community members and hundreds of students. It has been recognized as a model of digital and publicly engaged scholarship.

== Projects ==
The primary projects in the series are the Seattle Civil Rights and Labor History Project, the Great Depression in Washington State Project, the Waterfront Workers History Project, the Labor Press Project, the Seattle General Strike Project, the Communism in Washington State Project and the Antiwar and Radical History Project. The Strikes! Labor History Encyclopedia for the Pacific Northwest draws together the resources available on the other sites and adds additional information on workers from the many industries and communities of the region. Many of these resources are only digitized and available through the projects, having been culled from archival material and personal collections, and materials including the only known film of the 1919 Seattle General Strike and the 1934 West Coast Waterfront Strike are exceedingly rare.

== Impact ==
The Projects have gained attention as a trailblazing initiative in public scholarship and engagement between the University of Washington and the Seattle community to record histories like Filipino Cannery Unionism and the Chicano Movement in Washington state that are largely unavailable elsewhere. A unique, collaborative process has also given community members greater control over content than traditional academic research and created more investment by students in their work. The impact of the Projects beyond the academic realm was demonstrated when Washington state law on neighborhood association covenants changed as a result of information brought to light on racially exclusive housing covenants that remained in neighborhood charters. In other cases, the projects have brought light to rarely studied topics, like the Seattle Black Panther Party. The local Chapter was one of the first founded outside Oakland and one of the longest-lived. The Civil Rights and Labor History Project unearthed material and conducted oral histories that form the largest body of material on any Party chapter in the nation, including the founding chapter in Oakland.

All of the projects have been notable for the quantity of material made available online. The Labor Press Project hosts thousands of digitized articles from more than thirty different union and radical newspapers, and the Strikes! Labor History Encyclopedia contains a day-by-day database of articles from the Northwest related to labor, covering the crucial periods of 1915-1919 and 1930-1939. Video oral histories are a key part of the projects, showing first-hand perspectives that are placed alongside original academic essays and digitized historical materials. The Projects have also focused on outreach to Washington's public schools, working with educators to design curriculums using the materials to teach students about the sometimes forgotten history of labor and civil rights in the Northwest and fulfill State requirements.
