= West Coast waterfront strike =

The West Coast waterfront strike may refer to:

- 1916 West Coast waterfront strike
- 1934 West Coast waterfront strike
