= Waterfront Workers History Project =

- Commercial?: No
- Type of project: historical
- Location: University of Washington
- Website: Official website

The Waterfront Workers History Project is a program of the University of Washington, which serves to document the history of workers and unions active on the ports, inland waterways, fisheries, canneries, and other waterfront industries of the western United States and Canada, specifically, California, Oregon, Washington, Alaska, and British Columbia. In collaboration with the Pacific Northwest Labor and Civil Rights History Projects, and sponsored by the Harry Bridges Center for Labor Studies, the Project is a collective effort to organize and present historical data covering significant events from 1894 to the current day.

== Project history ==
Established in 2010, the Waterfront Workers History Project began with a team of research associates and financial support from the Harry Bridges Center for Labor Studies. The Project was established in partnership with the Unions Reexamined Working Group, an organization that studies the effects of union governance and organizational culture on solidarity and political commitments. The Project represents a collaborative effort between professors, students, labor unions, and community members.

== Overview ==
The Project provides access to a vast collection of digitized historical documentation and photographic resources for educational purposes. The image and document repository is available for study at the University of Washington and through an extensive Internet database portal on the university Web site. The online repository is organized by industry, with separate sections for longshore workers, maritime workers, cannery workers, and shipyard workers. Each section includes brief summaries, in-depth research reports, historical documents, newspaper articles, and rare photographs. The sections depict everyday life and labor on the West Coast waterfront as well as strikes and other dramatic struggles for workplace rights. A particular focus is given to the influential International Longshore and Warehouse Union. A detailed special section examines the 1934 West Coast Waterfront Strike that spurred the union's formation, and includes newspaper articles published during the strike, a day by day narrative of major events and a collection of archival photographs. Another section looks at the life of longtime President Harry Bridges, including footage of his testimony at a deportation hearing in 1950.

The Project includes more than 20 oral histories with longshore leaders, cannery workers, and labor history experts examining the tradition of dissent on the West Coast waterfront and the struggle of Filipino cannery workers for democratic unionism. Other industrial sections shed light on less-studied aspects of waterfront labor, including the trailblazing racial progressivism and integrationist efforts of the Marine Cooks and Stewards and the Ship Scalers Union.

== Historical collections ==
International Longshore and Warehouse Union Collection

Donations to the Project include historical collections from the International Longshore and Warehouse Union (ILWU) archives, offered by Union historian Gene Vrana. The ILWU donation includes rare digitized copies of the Waterfront Worker, the labor newspaper that served as a catalyst to address workers rights on the waterfront in the early 1930s, eventually leading to the 1934 strike and the creation of the ILWU.

On October 1, 2023, the ILWU filed for Chapter 11 bankruptcy, stating it can no longer afford to keep fighting claims by ICTSI.

=== Ronald E. Magden Collection ===
The Ronald E. Magden is an historian, author, and professor at Tacoma Community College. In 1977, Local 23 of the ILWU began preparing a grant proposal in response to a request by the Washington Commission for the Humanities. At this time, the Union asked Magden to assist them with writing and editing the documentation. The history that he uncovered about the waterfront workers initiated a 30-year involvement in researching the history of longshoremen on the Pacific Coast. The Ronald E. Magden Collection in the University of Washington Special Collections Library includes an extensive presentation of archival materials, from which researchers have created a database of thousands of documents, books, films, and nearly 200 digitized photographs of waterfront workers from the 1880s to the present.

== Archives ==
- Ronald Magden Papers. 1879–2003. 28.27 cubic Ft. ( 34 boxes) At the University of Washington Libraries Special Collections.
- Ship Scalers, Dry Dock, and Boat Yard Workers Union, Local 541 (Seattle, Washington). 1939–1991. 19 cubic feet (20 boxes).
