= 1916 West Coast waterfront strike =

Labor strike on the US West Coast

- Date: June 1, 1916 – October 4, 1916 (109 years ago)

The 1916 West Coast waterfront strike was the first coast-wide strike of longshore workers on the West Coast of the United States. The strike was a major defeat for the International Longshoremen's Association, and its membership declined significantly over the next decade. Employers won control over hiring halls and started a campaign to drive out the union's remaining presence.

== Background ==
The first longshore unions on the West Coast emerged in the late 19th century. In the early 20th century, the International Longshoremen's Association (ILA) became the dominant union on the West Coast. The craft-unionist ILA came into competition with the Industrial Workers of the World. The IWW was especially strong in the logging and mining industries of the Pacific Northwest, and many of the workers from those industries would work seasonally on the waterfront. In San Francisco, many other unions had recently won an eight-hour workday.

== Strike called ==
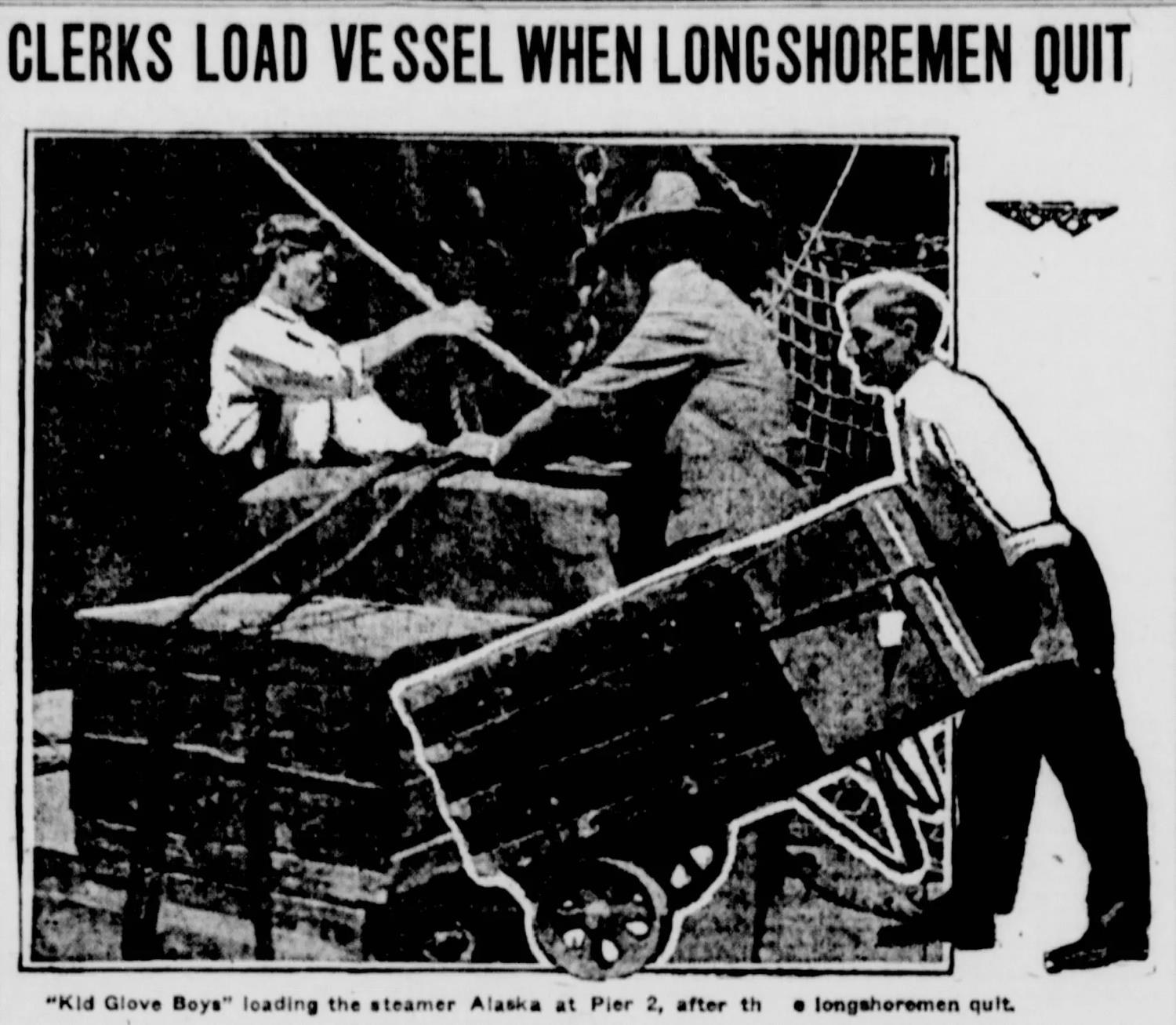
Published June 23, 1916, Seattle Star

On June 1, 1916, workers in all twelve West Coast ports went on strike to demand higher wages and an end to the open-shop system. A brief truce was established on June 9 but quickly collapsed after striking workers were killed in San Francisco and Seattle. The strike became more violent, with battles between strikers and police resulting in a few deaths and the destruction of property. Under pressure from a well-organized opposition by the San Francisco Chamber of Commerce, on July 17, the San Francisco local accepted an agreement and returned to work. The strike continued in other ports where the agreement was not accepted, but the loss of coastwide unity caused the strike to crumble. The last striking locals in Puget Sound reached a settlement on October 4, 1916, and workers returned to work without winning their demand of a closed shop.

== Aftermath ==
The strike ended in a massive defeat for longshore workers and the ILA. Employers gained full control over the hiring halls, known as fink halls, and established their own company unions, known as blue book unions after their blue membership books. In the fink hall system, hiring was mostly based on favoritism and bribes with the bosses. Over the course of the late 1910s and 1920s, waterfront employers engaged in aggressive efforts to rid the waterfront of genuine unionism, and the ILA's membership numbers dwindled.

The strike's defeat also represented a defeat for the American labor movement as a whole and opened the door for increased repression. In San Francisco, on July 22, five days after an agreement was reached, the Preparedness Day Bombings were carried out at a pro-World War I parade organized by the Chamber of Commerce. The bombings were used by the city government as an excuse to target socialist labor organizer Tom Mooney. Less than a year later, the United States entered World War I. A month after the Puget Sound locals ended their strike, at least five Wobblies were murdered in Everett, Washington, by police in November 1916 while on their way to support striking shingle weavers.

In Seattle, employers attempted to exploit racial animosities by bringing Black workers as strike breakers. Following the strike in 1917, the Seattle local reversed its segregationist policies and allowed Black workers to join the union. By the time of the Seattle General Strike in 1919, there were at least three hundred Black longshore workers. Following the 1919 strike, some Black workers became leaders in the Seattle local with the support of some IWW members.

Efforts were made by longshore workers to reverse the open shop and improve their conditions. Motivated by the success of the Russian Revolution and the lack of wage increases after World War I, longshore workers went on strike in Seattle in 1919, Portland in 1922, and San Pedro in 1923. These strikes were led by the IWW and were largely unsuccessful. In the following years, the US government engaged in brutal repression against the IWW, raiding their offices and arresting and deporting their members. This left a leadership vacuum in the labor movement on the West Coast, which in the 1930s became filled by the Communist Party and its affiliates. Longshore workers on the West Coast would not strike again until the "big strike" of 1934.
