= Noriko Sawada Bridges Flynn =

American writer (1923–2003)

Nikki Bridges Flynn
- Born: Noriko Sawada; February 11, 1923; Gardena, California, U.S.
- Died: February 7, 2003 (aged 79); Pescadero, California, U.S.
- Occupations: Author, civil rights activist
- Spouses: Harry Bridges (m. 1958; died 1990) Ed Flynn (m. 1994)

Noriko Bridges Flynn (née Sawada; February 11, 1923 – February 7, 2003), known as "Nikki Bridges Flynn", was a Japanese American writer and civil rights activist. She also helped overturn the law in Nevada barring mixed-race marriages.

== Biography ==
Noriko Sawada was born in Gardena, California to Japanese parents who leased land to grow their own crops. Her parents leased the land because it was illegal for them to own farmland at the time in California. She began classes at Santa Monica College, but she was forced to stop after her first year.

In 1942, she and her family were incarcerated in a Japanese internment camp near Poston, Arizona due to Executive Order 9066. She and her family were there for three years, behind barbed-wire fences. The experience affected Sawada, showing her the deep injustices in society. She says that she had felt "terribly angry... Everything was turned upside-down."

When she was released, Sawada and her parents, moved to Berkeley and she became active in the AFL-CIO, the Berkeley Interracial Committee and the War Relocation Authority. She worked for twelve years with attorney Charles Garry who represented political activists.

She met her first husband, Harry Bridges, at a fund-raiser for the Mine, Mill and Smelter workers and after falling in love, they decided to get married on Pearl Harbor Day in 1958. However, their application for a marriage license was denied because Nevada law forbade people of different races from getting married. The law in Nevada was written in 1846, and "prohibited marriages between whites and Asians," which the couple tried to circumvent by protesting that Sawada, being born in the United States was not a foreigner. She was also asked by the license clerk: "Are you black, white, brown, red or yellow?" To which Sawada had to answer, "Under those categories, I must be yellow." The case was noticed by the national press and lawyers for Bridges and Sawada struck down the Nevada law in four days, allowing the couple to marry in Reno.

In 1973, Bridges studied creative writing at San Francisco State University. Her writing was featured in Harper's and Ms. Magazine. In 1988, she was honored by the Pacific Asian American Women Bay Area Coalition with the Asian Woman Warrior award for her community advocacy.

In 1990, she read her poem, "To Be or Not to Be: There is No Such Option", at the government ceremony which apologized to Japanese Americans for the internment of Japanese Americans during World War II. The same year, Harry Bridges died. He had been friends with Ed Flynn for many years. Nikki wed Flynn in 1994.

Nikki Bridges Flynn died in Pescadero, California in her home on February 7, 2003.
