= Seattle Union Record =

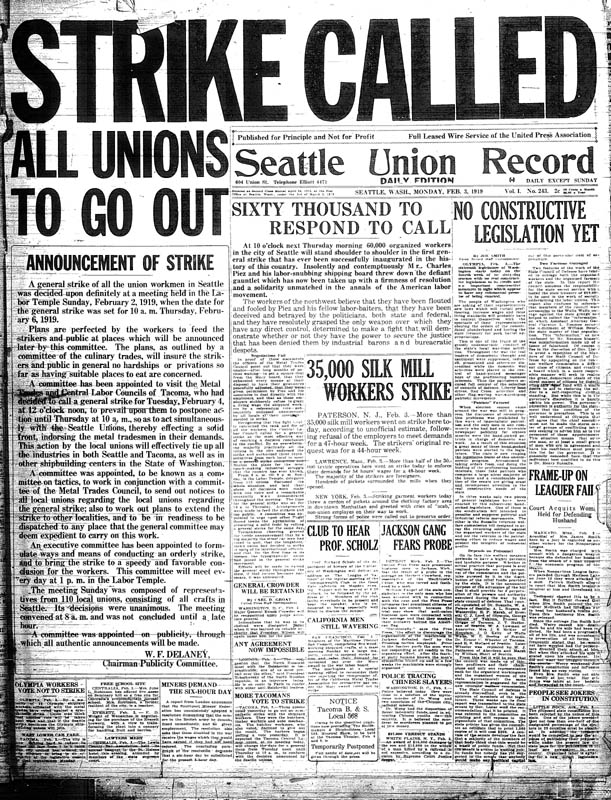
- Front page of the February 3, 1919 issue
- Type: Union newspaper
- Publisher: Central Labor Council of Seattle and Vicinity
- Editor: Harry Ault
- Founded: 1900
- Ceased publication: 1928
- Circulation: up to 80,000

The Seattle Union Record was a union-owned newspaper edited by Harry Ault. The paper was published weekly from February 20, 1900 to April 2, 1918 and was published daily from April 24, 1918 until it discontinued publication in 1928. In its own words, the newspaper was "Published for Principle and Not for Profit".

== History ==
Harry Ault was instrumental in the temporary success of the Union Record. Prior to working as the editor of the Union Record Ault worked for various other newspaper organizations. As a child, he worked as a newsboy selling the Kentucky Post. At 11 he started the Amateur's Friend and was selling the Weekly People the next year. He would later publish The Young Socialist and at age 19 became the editor of The Socialist. Nine years later, in 1912, he began to work as the editor of the Union Record which had a circulation of 3,000.

The Union Record went daily on the afternoon of April 24, 1918, launching with a daily circulation 40,000 — a number equal to about 90% of the trade unionists in the city of Seattle; this made it the country's first daily labor newspaper. The paper obtained wire service from United Press International, posting $100,000 security with the firm in the form of bonds to guarantee the costs occurring through telegraphic news reporting. Economical production was made possible by the company's ownership of three fast web printing presses.

From its humble origins with a print run of 3,000 copies, circulation of the Union Record would ultimately peak at the 80,000 mark.

The paper would play a large role in organizing and supporting the Seattle General Strike of 1919.

The name was revived in November 2000 as the name of an online newspaper run by the Pacific Northwest Newspaper Guild when journalists from the Seattle Post-Intelligencer and Seattle Times went on strike. It ceased publication in January 2001.

== Archives ==
- Harry E.B. Ault papers. 1899–1956. 5.46 cubic feet (13 boxes). At University of Washington Libraries, Special Collections.
