= Seattle Civil Rights and Labor History Project =

Project at the University of Washington

The Seattle Civil Rights and Labor History Project, one of the Pacific Northwest Labor and Civil Rights History Projects, is dedicated to social movements and labor history in the Pacific Northwest. It is directed by Professor James N. Gregory of the University of Washington. The project represents a unique collaboration between community organizations and University faculty, as well as undergraduate and graduate students. It has become a model of public history across the US and has been credited with changing the discussion of race and civil rights in the Seattle area.

== Content ==
The site provides over 70 oral history interviews with short video excerpts and brief biographies, as well as a listing of historic Civil Rights organizations, a page on Seattle's ethnic press, a resource with lesson plans for teachers, films and slideshows, and a page with in-depth historical essays that explore various issues, incidents and people. Each fully illustrated with photos and newspaper articles.

== Special sections ==
Also in the project is a special sections area featuring nine different sections which showcase comprehensive reports, oral histories, photo collections, and documents about many of the prominent movements and organizations involved in Seattle's rich history of Civil Rights and Labor activism. The sections detail farm workers in Washington State, the Ku Klux Klan in Washington, the Seattle Black Panther Party, Filipino Cannery Unions, the Washington Chicano movement, the 1907 Bellingham anti-Asian riots, the Congress of Racial Equality in Seattle, the Black Student Union at the University of Washington, and the United Construction Workers Association. A section on the history of housing segregation in Seattle attracted media attention and spurred changes in State law that allowed neighborhood associations to remove racially restrictive clauses from their covenants with greater ease.

== Educational Outreach ==
The Project includes nine full lesson plans for middle school and high school students, ranging from single class periods to longer units, created by Washington educators. The lesson plans are designed to encourage critical thinking and fulfill State requirements. Examples include ‘Martin Luther King’s Controversial Visit to Seattle’ and ‘Document Based Question: School Segregation in Seattle.’

== Chicano/a Movement in Washington State History Project ==
The Chicano/a Movement in Washington State History Project is a multimedia resource on the history of Chicano activism that includes first-hand oral histories, primary documents and academic research. It traces the development of the movement in the Yakima Valley and the University of Washington in Seattle. The Project is an initiative of the Seattle Civil Rights and Labor History Project at the University of Washington, alongside the Farm Workers in Washington State History Project.

=== Content ===
The Project focuses on several organizations including United Mexican American Students (UMAS), the Brown Berets, Movimiento Estudiantil Chicana/o de Aztlan (MEChA), United Farmworker Cooperative, El Teatro del Piojo, El Centro de la Raza, the Concilio for Spanish Speaking, SEAMAR Community Health Centers, and radio station KDNA. The histories of these organizations are bolstered by video oral histories, photographs from several personal collections and digitized copies of pamphlets and other documents. An in-depth timeline covers the years 1960–1985, and an illustrated essay details the period from the coalescing of the movement in 1967 to the 2006 immigration mobilizations. In addition, the site contains a database of more than 300 digitized newspaper articles that originally appeared between 1968 and 1979. Like other sections of the Seattle Civil Rights and Labor History Project, the site contains model lesson plans for middle school and high school teachers using the available materials.
