= Lawrence Milner =

American army serviceman and undercover Communist agent

Major Lawrence Milner was a retired major in the Oregon National Guard, who served for four years as an undercover G-2 agent in the Portland Communist Party, lied under oath while testifying, and "brought the state of Oregon into the plot" against Australian-born longshoremen union leader Harry Bridges in what TIME magazine called "the most important deportation hearing of the decade."

== Background ==
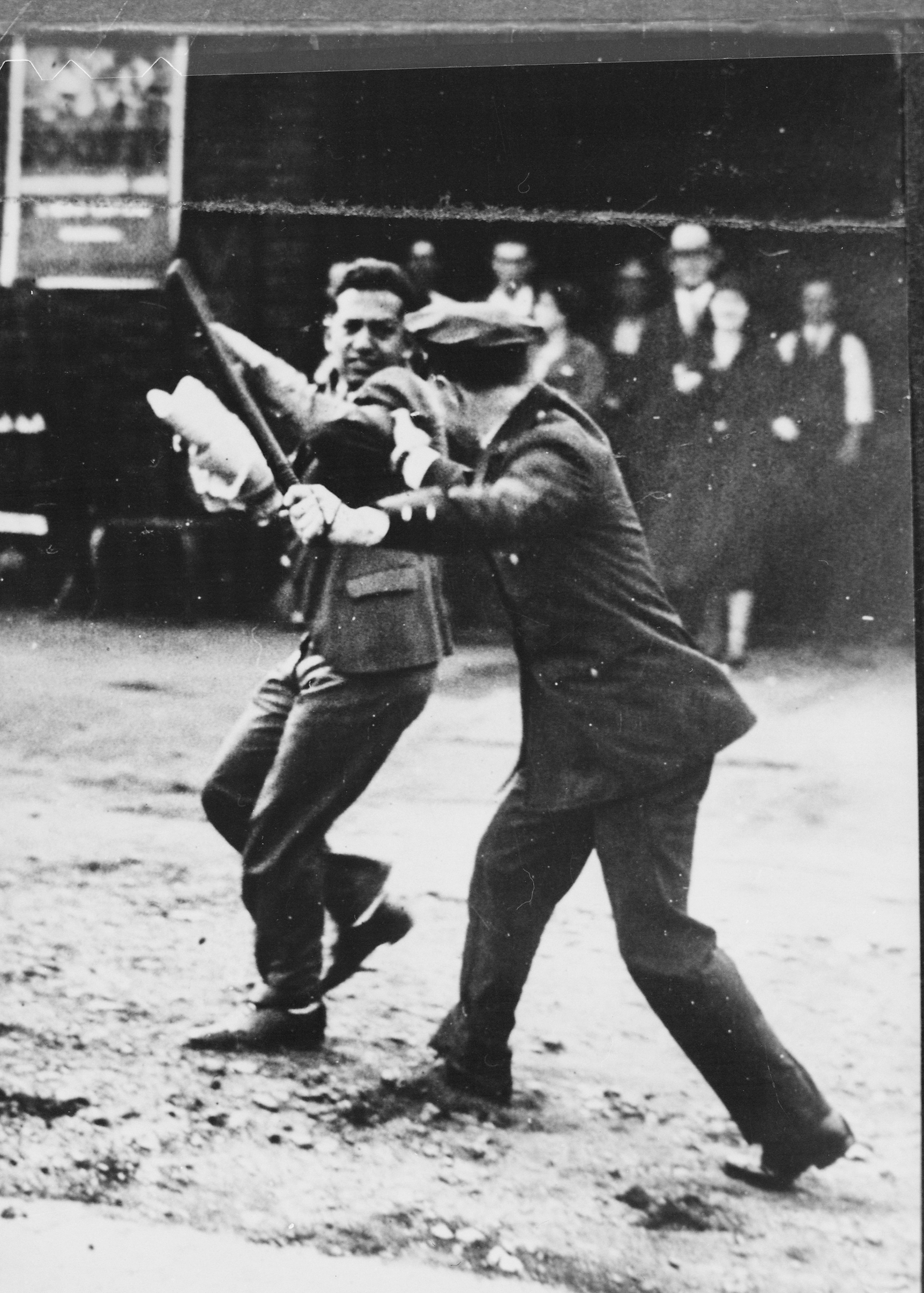
The 1934 West Coast waterfront strike led to Milner's undercover work to implicate Harry Bridges in 1939

During the 1934 West Coast waterfront strike, Bridges had been leader of the International Longshoremen's Association (ILA). By 1937, he would become president of the breakaway, CIO-affiliated International Longshore and Warehouse Union (ILWU). Just the process alone of Bridges' moving closer to the CIO and forming the ILWU was enough to land Bridges on the cover of 19 July 1937 issue of TIME magazine.

In its cover story, "CIO to Sea", TIME noted that, with the failure of the Little Steel Strike, John L. Lewis, head of both the United Mine Workers and the Congress of Industrial Organizations had turned to maritime unions to help build up the nascent CIO. The CIO's initial leadership included: Philip Murray of the Steel Workers Organizing Committee (SWOC); Sidney Hillman of the Amalgamated Clothing Workers; Harvey Fremming of the Oil Field, Gas Well & Refinery Workers; and Charles P. Howard of the Typographical Union. Lewis had already assembled several maritime union leaders: Joseph Curran of the insurgent East Coast seamen (National Maritime Union; Captain E.T. Pinchin of the Masters, Mates & Pilots of America; Vincent Malone of the Marine Firemen, Oilers, Watertenders & Wipers Association; and President Mervyn Rathborne of the American Radio Telegraphists. According to TIME, Lewish wanted Bridges, then still president of the Pacific Coast District of ILA, to lead the CIO's maritime arm. TIME described Bridges as "the bogey man of the Pacific." However, TIME also noted "That is the fact that though Harry Bridges is no revolutionist, millions of people think he is" and cited that fact as a potential problem for Lewis and his penchant for attracting communist-led unions. Among Bridges' enemies (thus Lewis' problems), TIME noted publisher William Randolph Hearst as chief. By July 1939, Bridges was serving as "West Coast director" of the CIO.

== Events ==
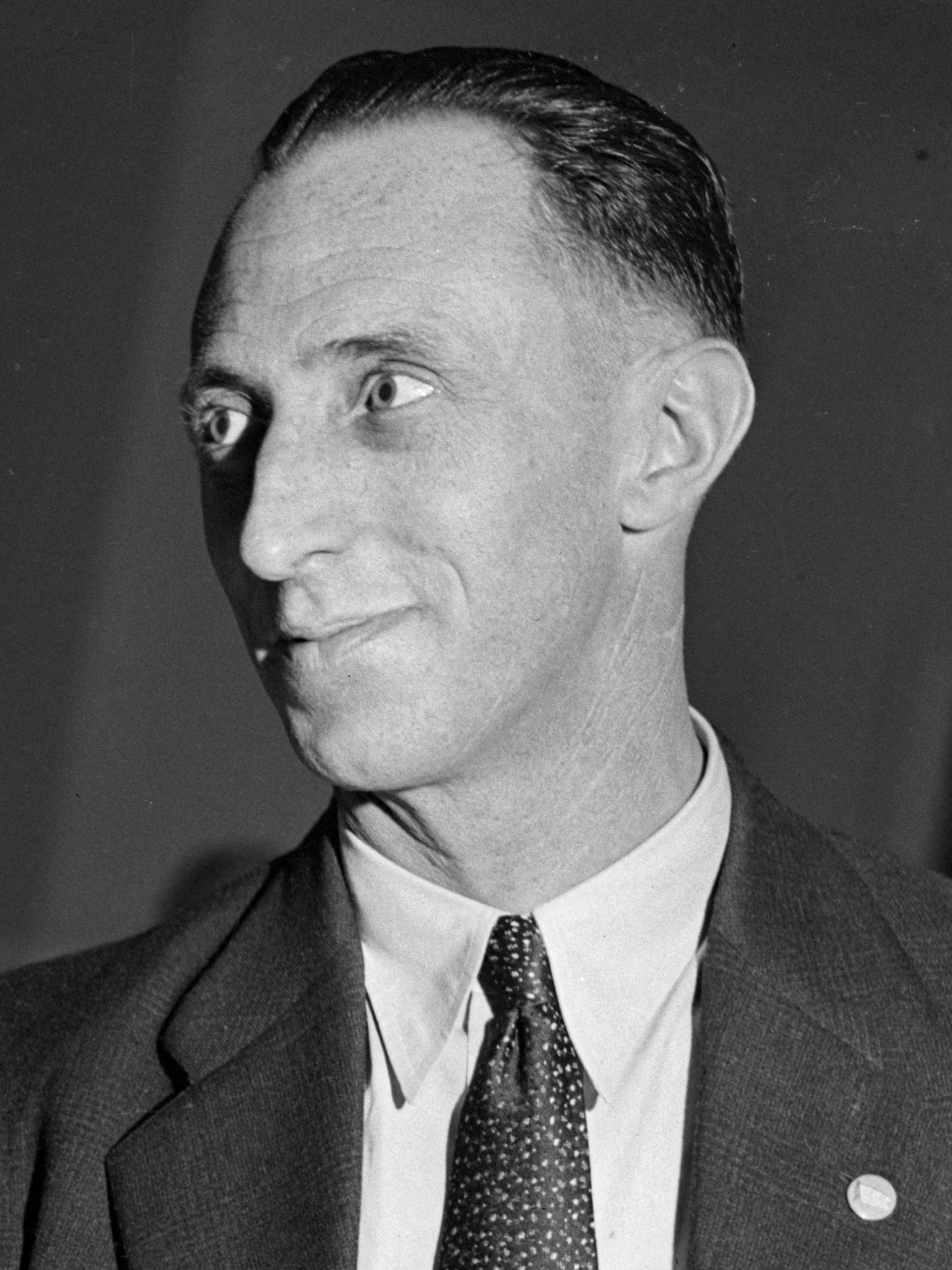
Harry Bridges (1935), head of the CIO-affiliated International Longshore and Warehouse Union in 1937, was the target of Milner's undercover efforts

In April 1939, deportation procedure for Bridges started. In mid-July 1939, hearings were taking place in a US Immigration office on Angel Island, California, for the deportation of Bridges. Immigration Commissioner James Houghteling oversaw; Dean James M. ("Chink") Landis of Harvard Law School and Secretary of Labor Francis Perkins served as examiners. The Bridges defense team included Carol Weiss King and Nathan Greene of the International Juridical Association (IJA).

Lawrence A. Milner was a retired major in the Oregon National Guard who found his skills in "military intelligence used in labor espionage." At least one source lists him as a member of the Oregon State Police.) When the hearing opened, some sources said that Milner impressed listeners with his "military bearing and appearance." while others described him as "middle-aged, hawk nosed, bland."

On July 12, 1939, "Under cross-examination Major Lawrence Milner of the Oregon national guard, who testified Monday [July 10, 1939] that Bridges attended Communist party meetings in Seattle in 1936 and 1937, denied that he had worked with local police or had discussed the case of Bridges with Seattle or Portland immigration authorities. Maj. Milner said the Communist ideal was 'to make this country a Soviet America'."

On July 13, 1939, the San Francisco Examiner reported as a highlight that Bridges had taken the CPUSA name of "Rossi", as in Angelo Joseph Rossi, mayor of San Francisco. John Lewis Leech, formerly "one of the highest leaders of the party" in Los Angeles, testified for the government that Bridges, working with the Communist Party, had helped formulate and plan the party's "red tactics" in the waterfront strike of 1936-37.

Newspapers covered the story (with Milner mentioned) from all over the United States: Honolulu, Hawaii; Paterson, New Jersey; Eugene, Oregon Marshall, Michigan; Harrisburg, Pennsylvania; Phoenix, Arizona; Hackensack, New Jersey; and Santa Cruz, California.

On July 14, 1939, the San Francisco Examiner reported that the day's highlight came when Bridges' defense team called for perjury charges against Milner, after Milner admitted to perjury, i.e., that he had lied under oath.

TIME reported, "Major Lawrence Milner (retired) of the Oregon National Guard testified that he had been with Bridges to Communist Party meetings in Portland, seen him pay Party dues, knew that he avoided Communists in public, and they him, to keep his interest secret. Witness Milner admitted having committed perjury at a Communist Party trial but said he only did so in the line of his undercover duty." Upon cross-examination, Leech testified that "four times... he was offered money to identify Bridges as a Red."

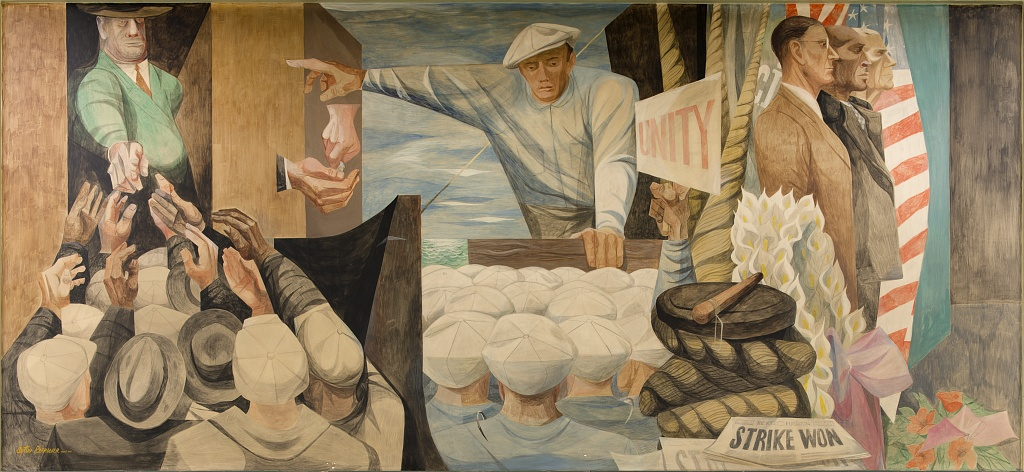
Anton Refregier's 1948 murals at the Rincon Center (formerly Rincon Annex Post Office) in San Francisco, shows Harry Bridges center

On July 15, 1939, the San Francisco Examiner reported that Leech remained firm in his testimony that Bridges was indeed a member of the party and that together they had attended inner circle Communist meetings. "Defense tactics, as in the case of Major Lawrence Milner, the Oregon National Guard secret service agent who was the Government's first witness, concentrated on trying to break down Leech's reputation", to little avail. By Friday, July 14, 1939, government attorney Tom Shoemaker got Leech to specify three communist meetings with Bridges and "big shots of the Communist Party." Examiner Landis denied Tom Mooney attendance to the Bridges' deportation hearing. Witnesses included Elaine Black, Ida Rothstein, Harry Jackson, Louise Todd, James Garrison, Catherine Key, and Myrtle Child. Government attorney Aubrey Grossman, "youngest of the trio of defense attorneys", described Leech's record of arrests. Grossman alleged Leech had been a labor "scab", which Leech denied. Examiner Landis announced he expected to make his decision and a summary of his findings within two weeks after the case concluded."

In sum, TIME magazine pronounced the entire event as "the most important deportation hearing of the decade."

The deportation hearings found that Bridges did not qualify for deportation because he was not currently—as the Alien Act of 1918 required—a member of or affiliated with an organization that advocated the overthrow of the government.

== Legacy ==
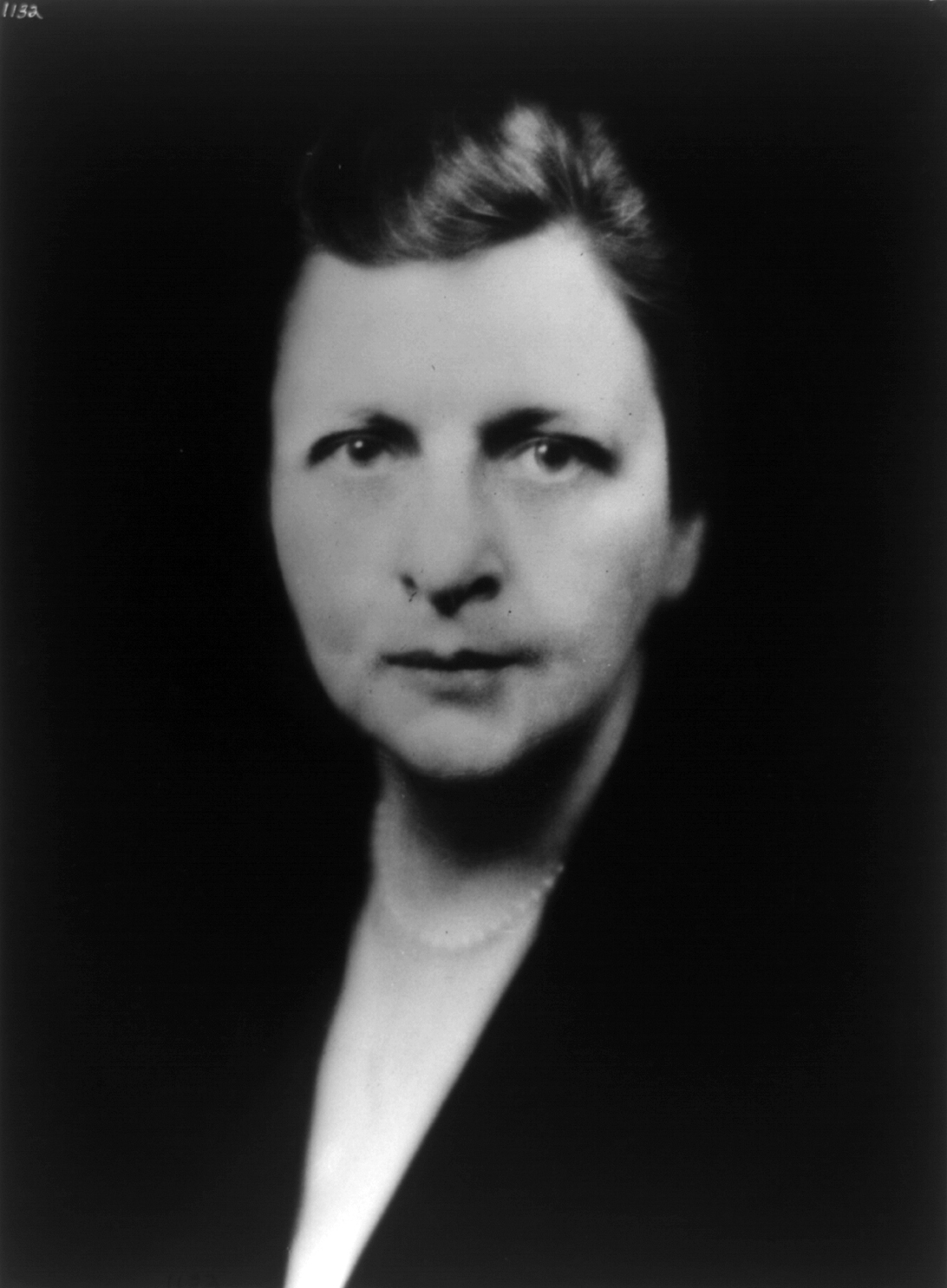
Frances Perkins, 4th United States Secretary of Labor, received calls for her own impeachment for her role in the Bridges case from the Republican-dominated US Congress

As the hearing ended, TIME magazine noted that "some Congressmen think" Labor Secretary Perkins should have been "impeached for not sending Bridges away long ago."

In its August 13, 1940, issue, the New Masses called Milner a "self-professed Communist chauffeur and undercover operative of the Military Department of Oregon" who became "cornered by his admitted perjury, virtually begging for mercy."

One of the legacies of this hearing was the Smith Act of 1940, written so federal authorities could deport Bridges in a future attempt (the Smith Act allowed deportation of an alien who was a member or affiliated "at any time" since arriving in the U.S. with such an organization advocating overthrow of the government). The Smith Act led in turn to the Smith Act trials of Communist Party leaders, which lasted from 1949 to 1958.
