= Strikes! Labor History Encyclopedia for the Pacific Northwest =

Strikes! Labor History Encyclopedia of the Pacific Northwest is a clearinghouse of information on the labor history of the region developed by the University of Washington and Professor James N. Gregory as part of the Pacific Northwest Labor and Civil Rights History Projects. The Encyclopedia covers the major industries of Washington state, major unions and worker struggles, civil rights activism among many ethnic communities, radical organizations, the Great Depression and the New Deal and the region's rich history of labor and radical newspapers.

== Content ==
The site is organized into thematic categories, focusing on the core industries and movements that have shaped the social history of the region. These include the timber, waterfront, aerospace, construction, and farm industries. Outside of unions and strikes, other aspects of workers and their struggles are examined, from everyday life in the Great Depression to labor culture and art. A particular focus is also given to the intertwined history of radical organizations with labor struggles, including the Industrial Workers of the World, the Communist Party and the United Construction Workers Association. Civil rights organizations and the struggles of black, Asian-American, women, and Latino workers for jobs, housing and equal rights is also cataloged. Much of the content is housed by the individual projects of the Pacific Northwest Labor and Civil Rights History initiative, which has gathered thousands of oral histories, rare photos, vintage newspapers and original academic research.
