= Harry Bridges =

Australian-American union leader (1901–1990)

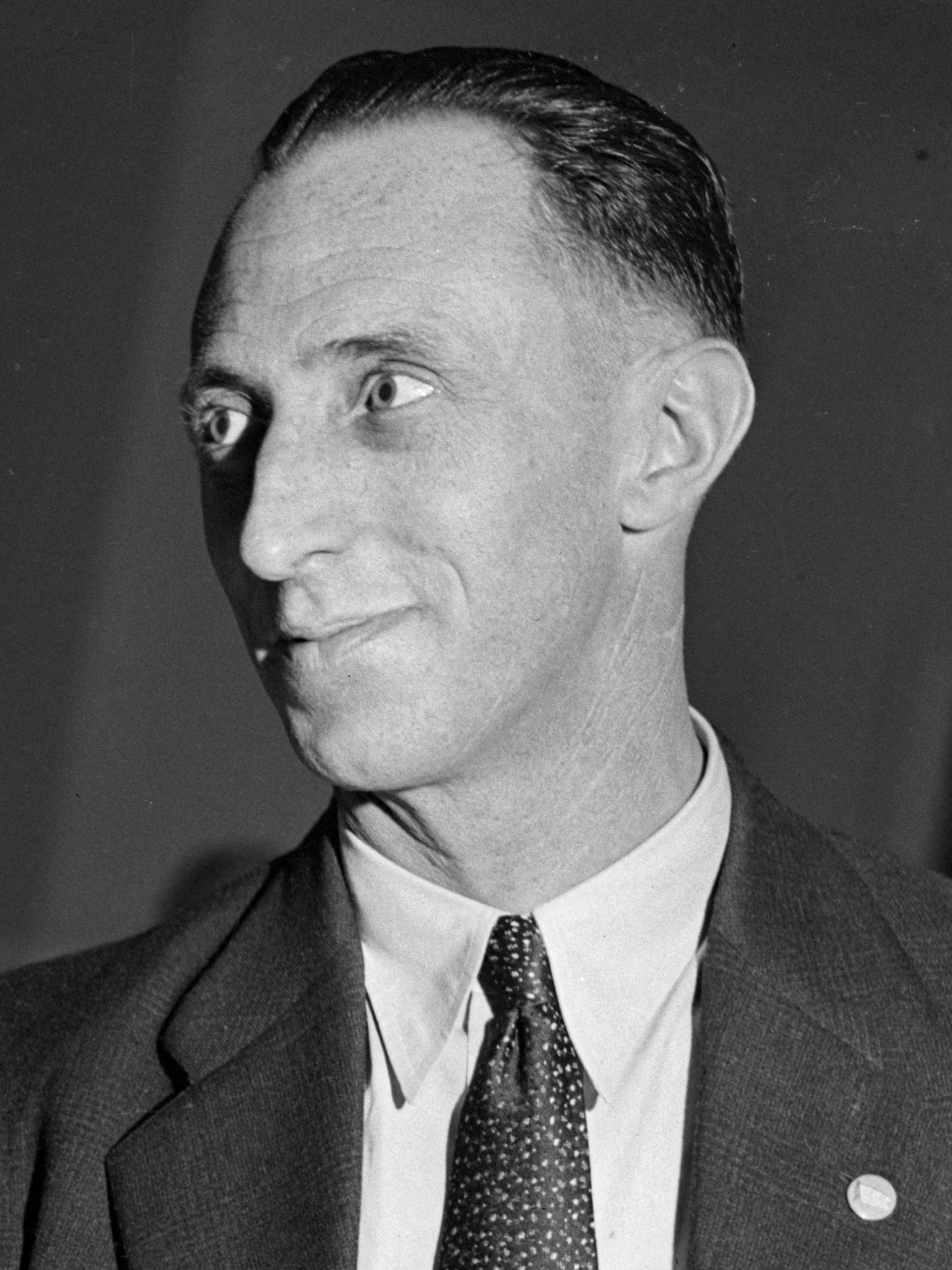
- Bridges in 1935

1st President of the International Longshore and Warehouse Union
- In office August 11, 1937 – April 18, 1977
- Preceded by: Office established
- Succeeded by: Jimmy Herman

Personal details
- Born: Alfred Renton Bryant Bridges; 28 July 1901 Kensington, Victoria, Australia
- Died: 30 March 1990 (aged 88) San Francisco, California, U.S.
- Spouses: Agnes Brown (m. 1934; div. 1945) Nancy Fenton Berdecio (m. 1946; div. 1954) Noriko Sawada (m. 1958)
- Children: 4
- Occupation: Labor leader

Harry Bridges (28 July 1901 – 30 March 1990) was an Australian-born American union leader, first with the International Longshoremen's Association (ILA). In 1937, he led several Pacific Coast chapters of the ILA to form a new union, the International Longshore and Warehouse Union (ILWU), expanding its ranks to include thousands of additional warehouse workers. He served as ILWU president for the next 40 years.

Bridges rose to national fame as a key figure in the 1934 West Coast waterfront strike. He was designated a subversive alien by the U.S. government, with the goal of deporting him, but it was never achieved. He became an American citizen in 1945. He was then convicted by a federal jury for having lied about his Communist Party membership when applying for naturalization; however, the perjury conviction was overturned in 1953 by the Supreme Court because the original indictment against Bridges occurred outside the statute of limitations.

His power as a union president was diminished in 1950 when the CIO expelled the ILWU as part of a purge of alleged Communist influence, but Bridges continued to be re-elected by ILWU membership and remained influential until his retirement in 1977.

== Background ==
Bridges was born Alfred Renton Bryant Bridges in Kensington, Victoria, Australia. His father, Alfred Earnest Bridges, was a successful suburban realtor, and his mother, Julia (née Dorgan) Bridges, was a devout Roman Catholic of Irish descent.

== Career ==
Bridges went to sea at age 16 as a merchant seaman and joined the Australian sailors' union. Inspired by the works of Jack London, Bridges "gravitated toward sailing and socialism." He took the name Harry from a favorite uncle, who was a socialist and an adventurer. Bridges entered the United States in 1920, where his American colleagues gave him several nicknames, including "The Nose" for his prominent hawk-like nose; and "The Limey" or "Limo", as they couldn't differentiate between an Australian and an Englishman. He was also teased about his passion for horse racing.

In 1921, Bridges joined the Industrial Workers of the World (IWW), participating in an unsuccessful nationwide seamen's strike. He soon dropped out of the IWW with doubts about its effectiveness, but his early experiences in the IWW and in Australian unions influenced his belief that rank-and-file workers required "a militant, class-conscious organization".

In 1922, Bridges left the sea for longshore work in San Francisco. By that time, the shipowners had created a company union, known as the Blue Book. This occurred in the aftermath of a failed 1919 strike that had all but destroyed the International Longshoremen's Association (ILA) local in San Francisco. At first, Bridges shunned the Blue Book, finding casual work on the docks as a "pirate". In 1924, after he joined the Riggers' and Stevedores' Union and participated in a Labor Day parade, he was blacklisted for several years. He reluctantly joined the company union in 1927 and worked as a winch driver and rigger on a steel-handling gang.

=== Albion Hall group ===
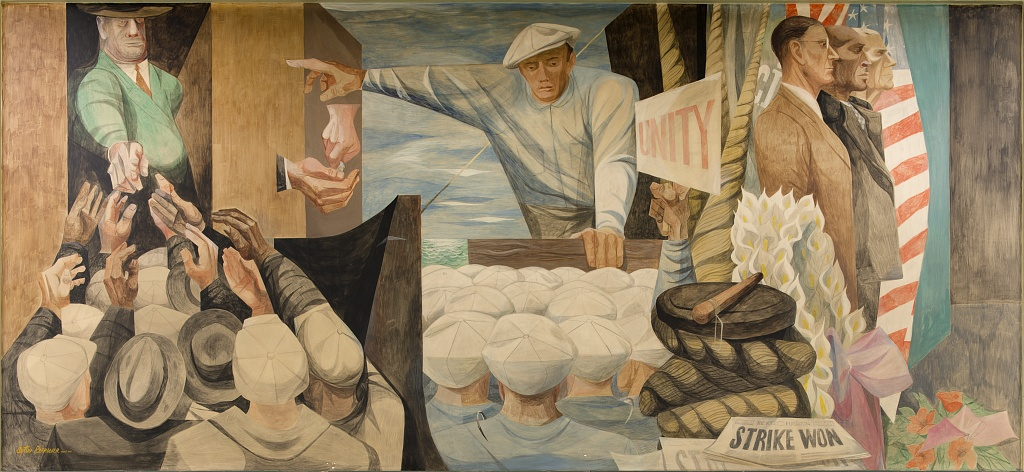
Central figure representing Bridges, from Anton Refregier's 1948 murals at the Rincon Center (formerly the Rincon Annex Post Office)

In 1933, the ILA sought to reestablish itself on the West Coast, chartering a new local in San Francisco. With the passage that year of the National Industrial Recovery Act (NIRA)—which contained encouraging but unenforceable provisions declaring that workers had the right to organize unions of their own choice—thousands of longshoremen joined the new ILA local.

At the time, Bridges was a member of a circle of longshoremen referred to as the "Albion Hall group", named for their meeting place. It attracted workers from a variety of backgrounds—Communist Party USA (CPUSA) members who were trying to organize all longshoremen; sailors and other maritime workers; former IWW members, and others with no clearly defined politics—into the Marine Workers Industrial Union (MWIU), as a revolutionary, industry-wide alternative to the ILA and American Federation of Labor (AFL) unions.

The Albion Hall group had acquired some influence on the docks through its publication, the Waterfront Worker, a mimeographed sheet sold for a penny that published articles written by longshoremen and seamen, almost always under pseudonyms. These articles focused on workers' day-to-day concerns: the pace of work, the weight of loads, abusive bosses, and unsafe conditions. While the first editions were published in the apartment of an MWIU member on a second-hand mimeograph machine, the paper remained independent of both the CPUSA and the MWIU.

Although Bridges was sympathetic to much of the MWIU's program, he chose in 1933 to join the new ILA local. When the local held elections, Bridges and fellow members of the Albion Hall group comprised a majority of the executive board and secured two of the three business agents positions. The group stressed the self-help tactics of syndicalism, urging workers to organize by taking part in strikes and slowdowns, rather than depending on governmental assistance under the NIRA. It also campaigned for membership participation in the new ILA local, which had not bothered to hold any membership meetings. Eventually, the group laid the groundwork for organizing on a coastwide basis, meeting with activists from Portland, Oregon and Seattle, Washington, and building a federation of all of the different unions that represented maritime workers.

Under Bridges' leadership, the Albion Hall group organized a successful 5-day strike in October 1933 to force Matson Navigation Company to reinstate four longshoremen it had fired for wearing ILA buttons on the job. Longshoremen at other ports threatened to refuse to handle Matson cargo unless the company rehired the four men.

=== 1934 West Coast Longshore Strike ===
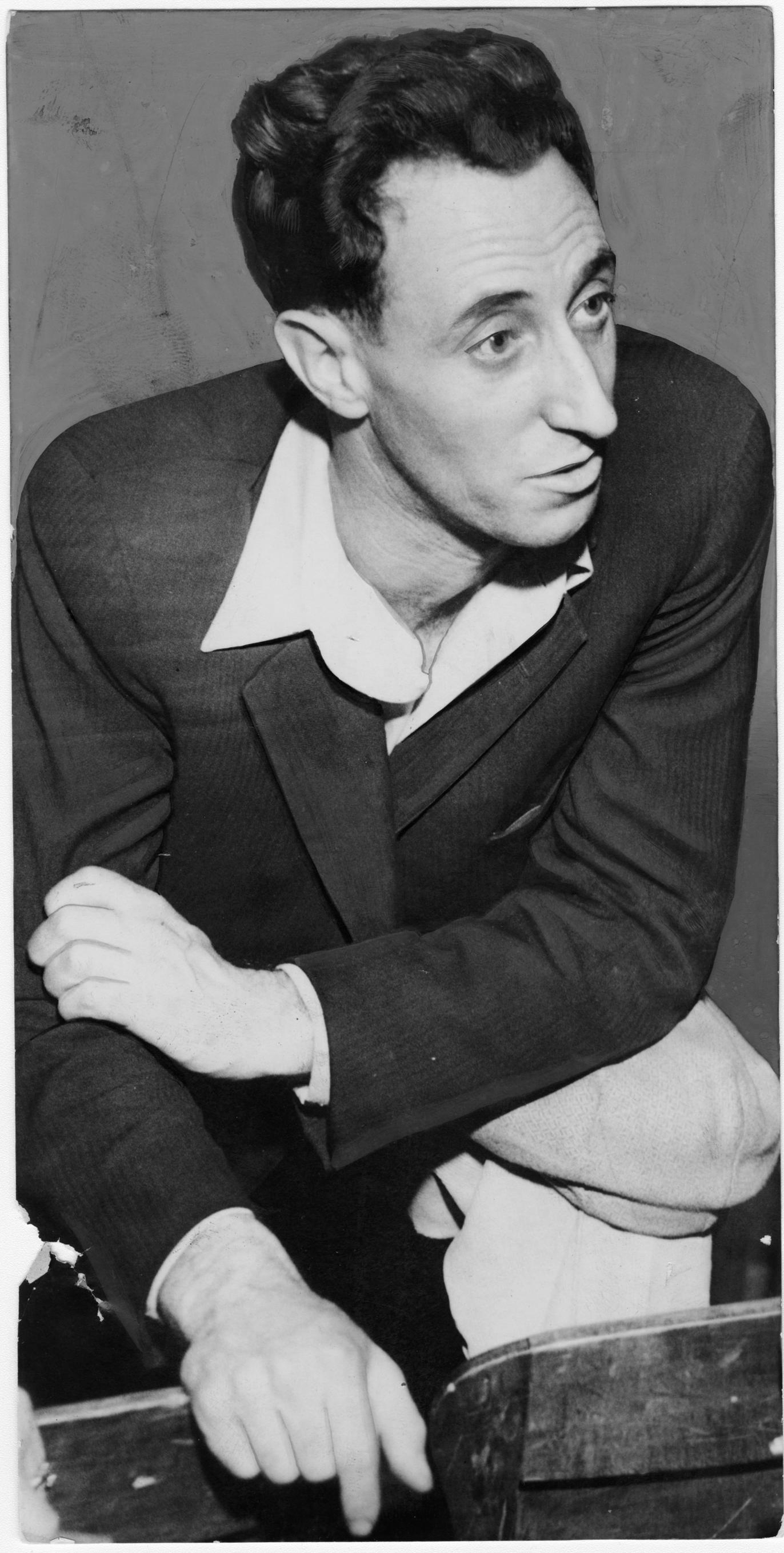
Bridges during the strike, July 9, 1934

Early in 1934, Bridges and the Albion Hall group, along with militants in other ports, started planning a coast-wide strike. The Roosevelt administration tried to head off the strike by appointing a mediation board to oversee negotiations, but neither side accepted its proposed compromise. Bridges was elected chairman of the strike committee. The strike began on 9 May. While the elected local officers were the nominal leaders of the strike at its outset, Bridges led the planning of the strike along with his friend Sam Kagel. They recruited rank-and-file opposition to the two proposed contracts that the leadership negotiated and the membership rejected during the strike, and the dealings with other unions during related events.

A four-day San Francisco General strike took place after "Bloody Thursday" on 5 July, when police aided the Waterfront Employers Association in trucking cargo from the pierheads to the warehouses through the union's picket line. Scores of strikers were beaten or wounded by gunfire during the battle. During a coordinated raid on the union mess hall at the corner of Steuart and Mission, San Francisco Police shot and killed Howard Sperry, a striking sailor, and Nicholas Bordoise (aka George Counderakis), a member of the cooks' union and a strike sympathizer helping out at the mess hall. Scores of other men were wounded by police gunfire as well, including a number of bystanders, as the ensuing battle quickly spilled into the nearby downtown area.

Bridges became the chief spokesperson for the union in negotiations after workers rejected the second agreement negotiated by the old leadership in June. Bridges did not control the strike: over his strong objections, the ILA membership voted to accept arbitration to end the strike. Similarly, in 1935, Bridges' opposition did not stop the ILA leadership from extending the union's contract with the employers, rather than striking in solidarity with the seamen.

=== Growth and independence ===
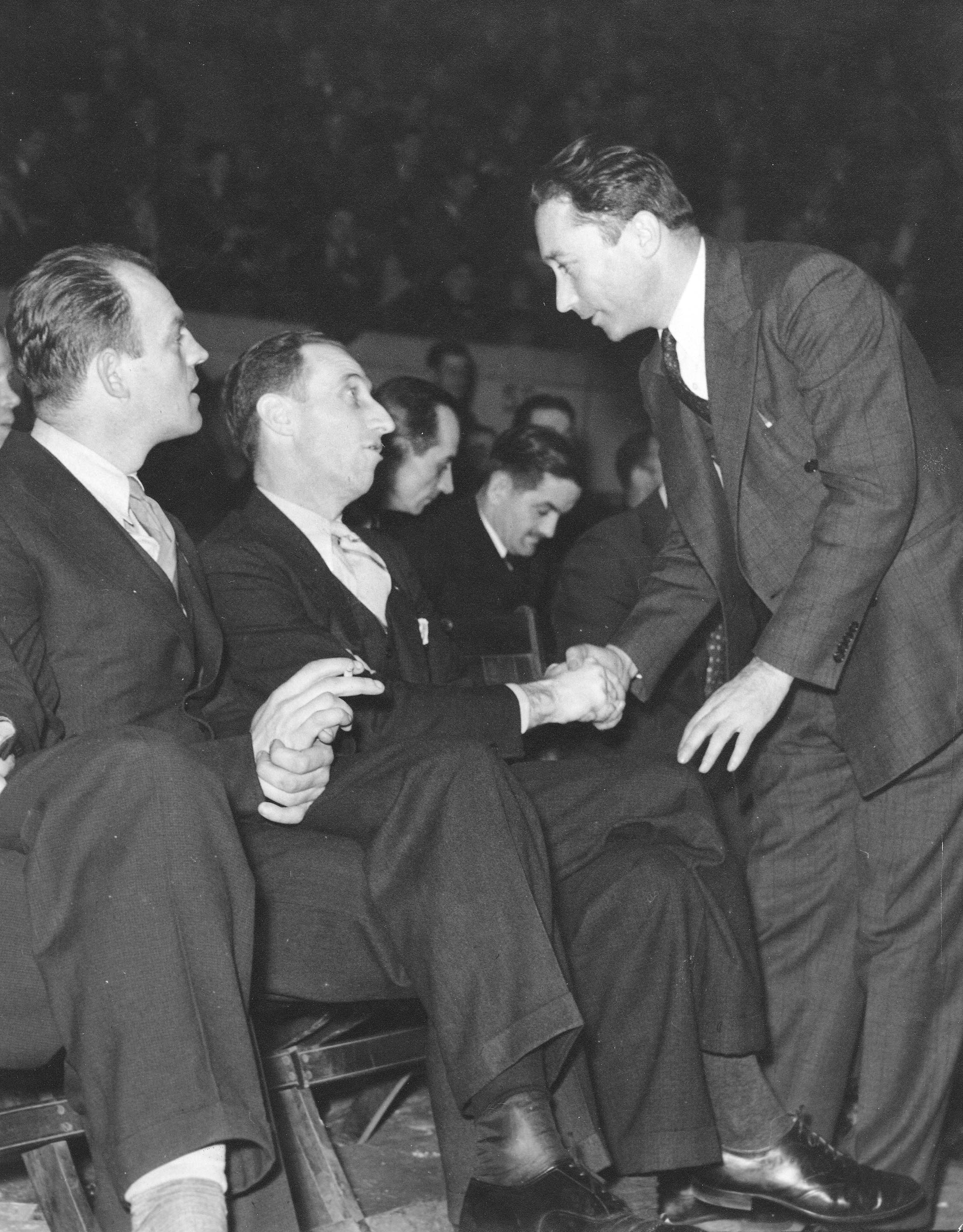
Bridges shaking hands with fellow "Red" labor leader Charles S. Zimmerman c. 1930s

Bridges was elected president of the San Francisco local in 1934 and president of the Pacific Coast District of the ILA (known as the ILA-PCD) in 1936. During this period, the longshoremen's union began organizing warehouses, both in the ports and those at a distance that received the goods which the longshoremen handled. As Bridges explained it, his union was "not going to stay on the waterfront" but rather was "going inland". By joining forces with warehousemen, the ILA-PCD could control multiple phases of the transport and distribution of freight: shipping, storing, and selling. The West Coast-based Industrial Association of employers watched this development with fury:

"The 'march inland', as it is termed by the maritime unions, is part of a well laid plan of Harry Bridges and his fellow radicals to extend control over the movement of all merchandise in San Francisco, as well as on the waterfront."

Bridges led the effort in 1935 to form the Maritime Federation of the Pacific (MFP), which brought together seven maritime unions for common action. The MFP helped the Sailors' Union of the Pacific win the same sort of contract after an extended strike in 1936 that the longshoremen won in 1934.

Throughout 1936, the ILA-PCD also built strong unions on the docks in Hawai'i. Later, the ILWU under Bridges would organize sugar and pineapple workers on the plantations in Hawai'i, against the concerted opposition of employers and most of the Hawaiian political establishment. Bridges' efforts were credited with transforming the labor landscape of the islands.

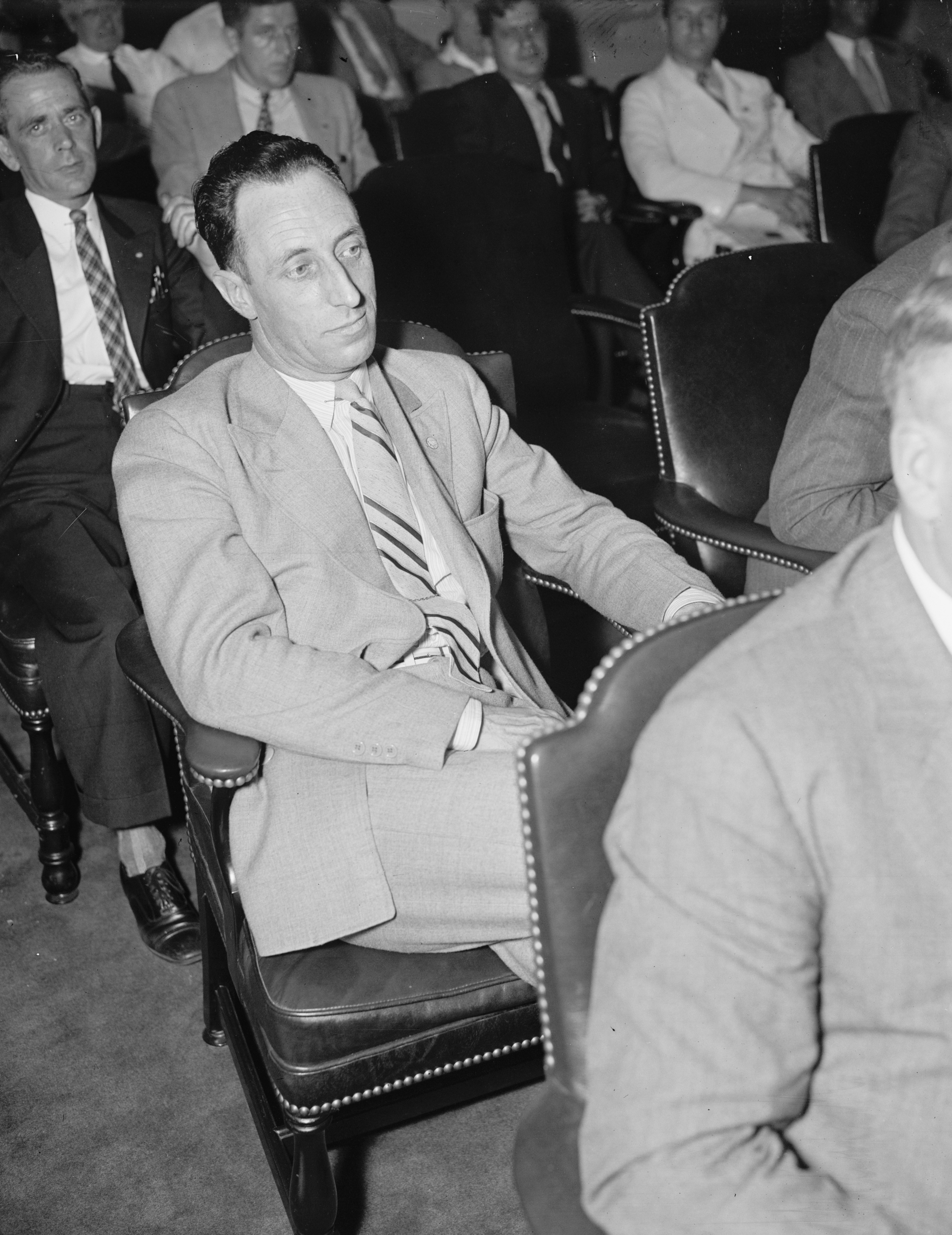
Bridges at a meeting of maritime labor leaders, July 7, 1937

In 1937, the Pacific Coast District, with the exception of three locals in the Northwest, formally seceded from the ILA, renaming itself the International Longshoremen's and Warehousemen's Union (ILWU). This occurred after the ILA had tried to reorganize the existing West Coast locals, abandon representation of warehousemen, and reverse union policies on issues such as unemployment insurance. Bridges' main frustration with the ILA was its lack of political engagement. He viewed it as part of "the Gompers tradition, which taught avoidance of independent political action and denied the existence of class relationships, limited the labor movement to temporary advances, usually counteracted in short order." Bridges believed that workers could only preserve their economic gains by exercising their political power. He was elected president of the new ILWU union, which quickly affiliated with the Congress of Industrial Organizations (CIO). Soon thereafter, John L. Lewis named Bridges the West Coast director for the CIO.

As a measure of his growing influence in the U.S. labor movement, Bridges was featured on the cover of Time magazine on 19 July 1937.

=== CPUSA membership ===
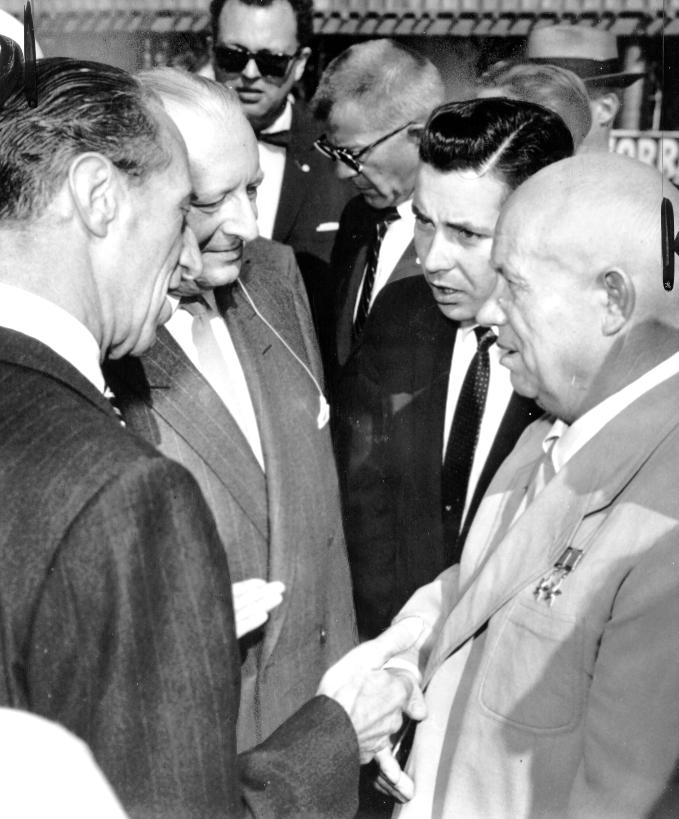
Bridges shaking hands with Soviet Premier Nikita Khrushchev, September 21, 1959

Until his death in 1990, Bridges consistently disavowed any actual membership in CPUSA. Following the breakup of the Soviet Union, researchers discovered a 1937 Comintern file in Kremlin archives containing a list of CPUSA officers that included the entry "ROSSI (Bridges)—C.P. USA Central Committee member. President of the Dockers and Port Warehouse Workers' Union".

However, in a 2023 biography of Bridges, professor emeritus Robert W. Cherny concluded that Bridges had not been a CPUSA member based on careful checks against multiple contemporary sources, however much Bridges agreed with various aspects of Marxism or extolled the USSR. Instead, he found that Bridges was one of a few people who "listened to, consulted with, offered advice, and asked for advice, but were not given directions and were not under party discipline."

=== Legal battles ===
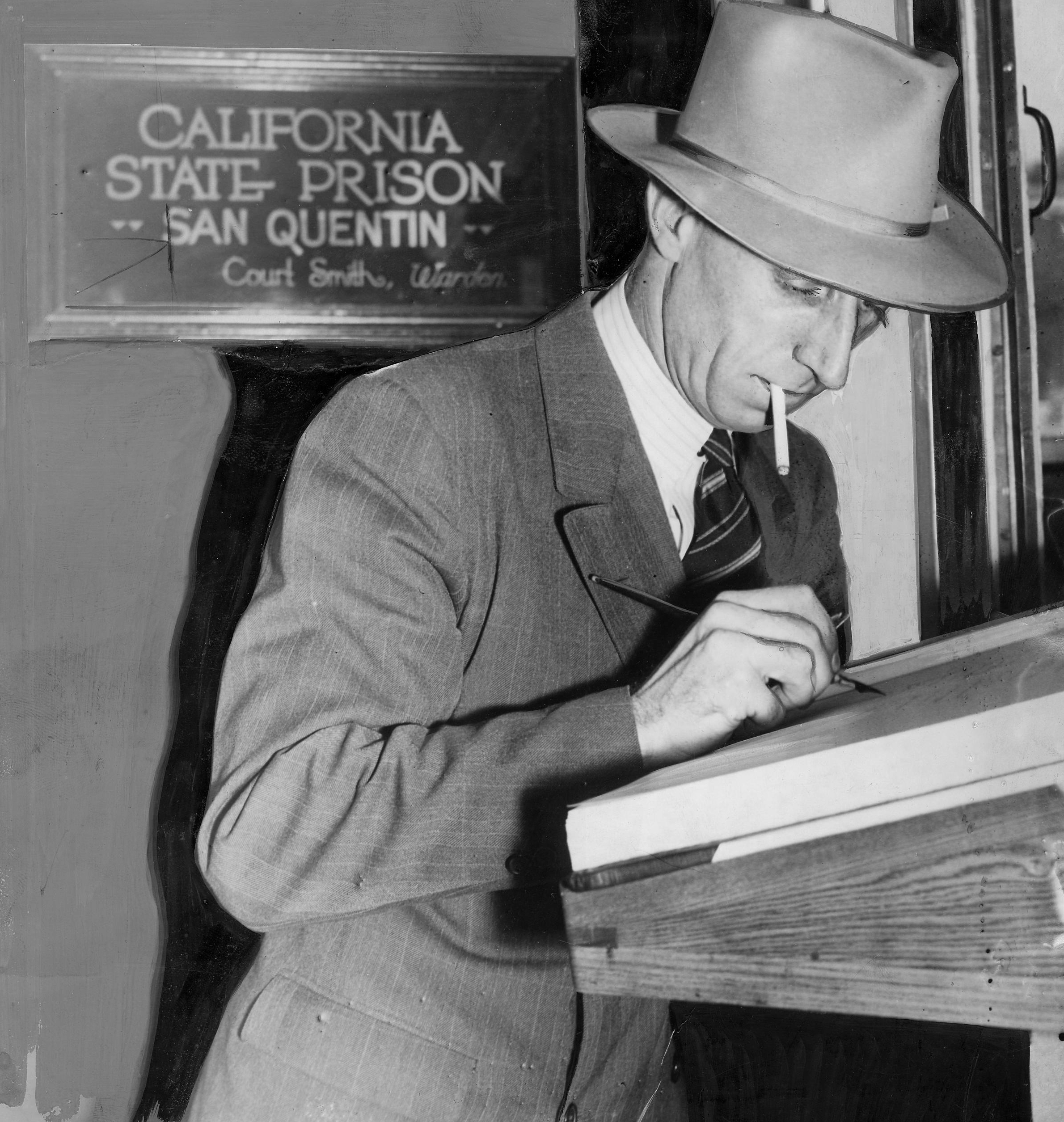
Bridges signs the register at San Quentin State Prison, August 25, 1939

In mid-July 1939, hearings took place at the Angel Island Immigration Station to deport Bridges. Government witnesses included Major Lawrence Milner and ex-communist official John Lewis Leech. While Leech held fast to his testimony, Milner confessed to perjury, for which the Bridges defense team, led by Carol Weiss King, demanded indictment, although there is no evidence Milner was ever indicted.

The hearings found Bridges did not qualify for deportation because he was not currently — as the Alien Act of 1918 required — a member of or affiliated with an organization that advocated the overthrow of the government. The Smith Act of 1940 was written so federal authorities could deport Bridges. It allowed deportation of an alien who was a member or affiliated "at any time" since arriving in the U.S. with such an organization advocating overthrow of the government. A second round of deportation hearings ended after ten weeks in June 1941. In September 1941, the special examiner who led the hearings recommended deportation, but the Board of Immigration Appeals (BIA) reversed that order after finding the government's two key witnesses to be unreliable.

In May 1942, though the Roosevelt administration was now putting its anti-Communist activities on hold in the interest of furthering the Soviet-American alliance, Attorney General Biddle overruled the BIA and ordered Bridges deported at once. Bridges appealed and lost in District Court and the Court of Appeals. But the U.S. Supreme Court overruled deportation, holding 5–3 on June 18, 1945, in Bridges v. Wixon, that the government had not proven Bridges was affiliated with the CPUSA. The Supreme Court interpreted "affiliation" to mean "less than membership but more than sympathy, and a working alliance to bring to fruition the proscribed program of a proscribed organization, as distinguished from mere co-operation with a proscribed organization in lawful activities".

Bridges became a naturalized U.S. citizen in 1945. With the persistent goal of deportation, the federal government tried Bridges in 1948 for fraud and perjury, specifically, for denying when applying for naturalization that he had ever been a member of the Communist Party. The jury convicted Bridges and two co-defendants. He was sentenced to five years in prison and his citizenship was revoked. The Supreme Court in a 5-3 decision overturned the conviction in 1953 because the indictment on fraud and perjury charges did not occur within the three years set by the statute of limitations. The government dropped the criminal charges and pursued a case in civil court in June and July 1955, hoping to overturn Bridges' naturalization because it had been obtained by fraud. The trial judge ruled in Bridges' favor and the government did not appeal.

=== Political battles ===
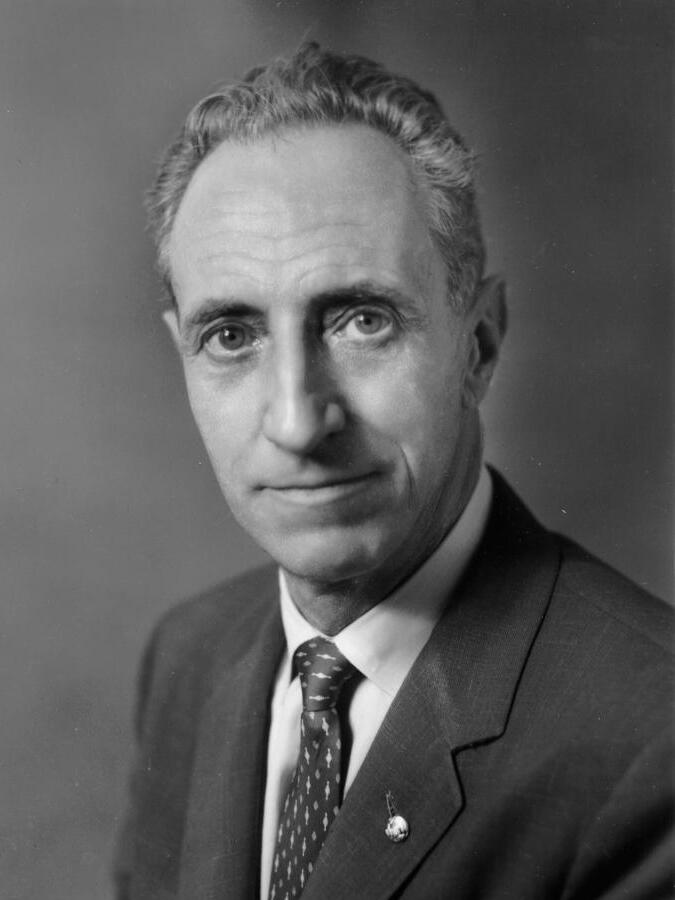
Portrait by Chase, 1961

Bridges hewed to the Communist Party line throughout the late 1930s and 1940s. After the Molotov–Ribbentrop pact was signed in 1939, the Party attacked Roosevelt and Churchill as warmongers and adopted "The Yanks Are Not Coming" slogan. Bridges denounced Roosevelt for betraying labor and preparing for war. CIO head John L. Lewis responded in October 1939 by abolishing the position of West Coast director of the CIO, which restricted Bridges' authority to California, while appointing new regional directors in Washington and Oregon who were strongly anti-communist.

Bridges continued opposing the Roosevelt administration, disparaging the New Deal, and urging union voters to withhold their support from Roosevelt. Bridges said they should wait to see what Lewis, who had now also split with the White House, recommended. That position proved highly unpopular with ILWU membership; many locals had already endorsed FDR for a third term and several locals, including ILWU Local 19 in Seattle, passed motions calling for Bridges to resign. He refused, noting that the union's constitution allowed for a recall election if fifteen percent of the membership petitioned for one. The ILWU executive board gave him a vote of confidence.

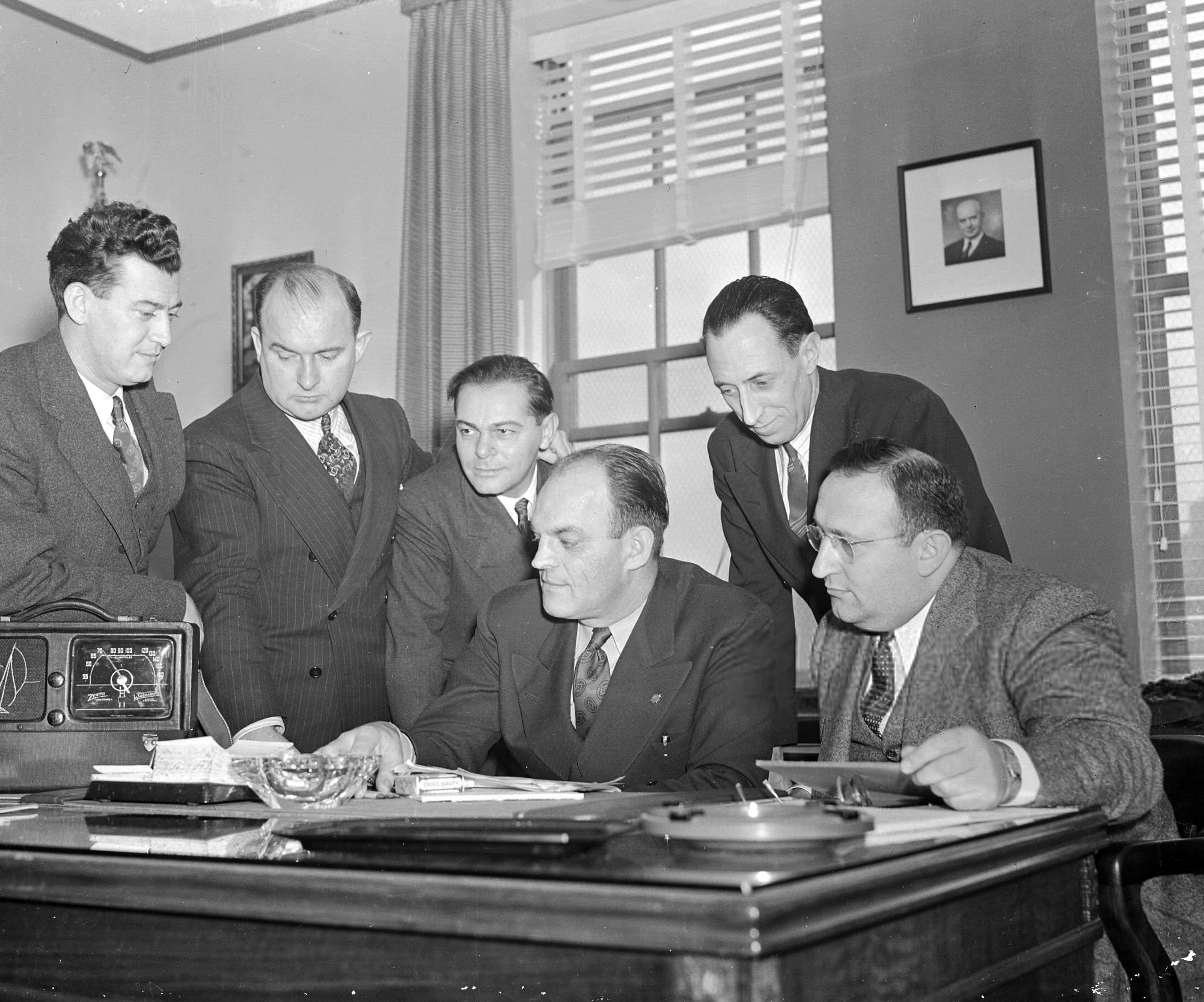
CIO leaders listen to President Roosevelt's Day of Infamy speech before pledging support to the war effort, December 12, 1941 Left to right: Austin Hogan, TWU; Michael Quill, TWU; Ben Gold, IFLWU; Joseph Curran, NMU; Harry Bridges, ILWU, Morris Muster, UFWA

After Germany attacked the Soviet Union in June 1941, Bridges urged employers to increase productivity in order to prepare for war. When the CIO later adopted a wartime no-strike pledge, Bridges supported the pledge. He proposed at the high point of the Communist Party's enthusiasm for unity—immediately after the Teheran Conference in 1943—that the pledge continue after the end of the war. The ILWU not only condemned the Retail, Wholesale Department Store Employees union for striking Montgomery Ward in 1943—after management refused to sign a new contract, cut wages, and fired union activists—but also assisted it in breaking the strike, by ordering members in St. Paul, Minnesota to work overtime, to handle overflow from the struck Chicago plant.

Bridges also called for a speedup of the pace of work—which may not have been inconsistent with the ILWU's goal of controlling the way work was done on the docks. The union had battled employers on this issue and the speedup was rejected by many ILWU members. Bridges later joined with Joseph Curran of the National Maritime Union, which represented sailors on the East Coast, and Julius Emspak of the United Electrical, Radio and Machine Workers of America, to endorse a wartime "national service law" proposal by Roosevelt that would have essentially placed the U.S. labor force at the disposal of the federal government.

Bridges' attitude changed sharply after the end of World War II. While he still advocated the post-war plan for industrial peace that the Communist Party—along with leaders in the CIO, the AFL, and the Chamber of Commerce—were advocating, he differed sharply with the CIO position on Cold War politics. He had his own opinions about the Marshall Plan and the application of the Truman Doctrine in Greece and Turkey, as well as participation in the World Federation of Trade Unions, viewing every element from the perspective of how it would affect his constituents.

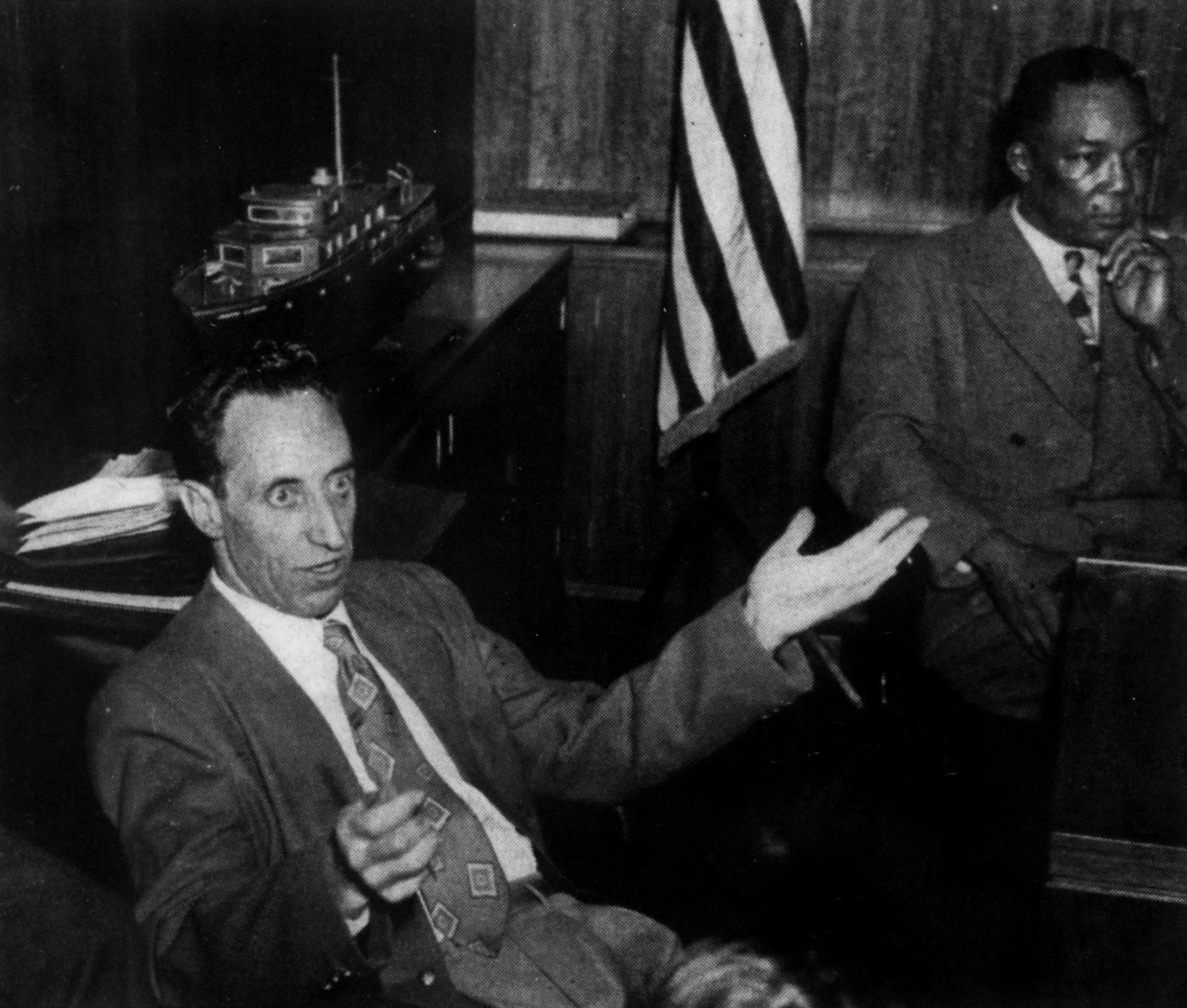
Bridges and National Maritime Union leader Ferdinand Smith c. 1948

Those foreign policy matters became labor issues for the ILWU in 1948, when the employers claimed that the union was preparing to strike in order to cripple the Marshall Plan. Emboldened by the new provisions of the Taft-Hartley Act—which outlawed the closed shop, required union officers to sign an oath that they were not members of the Communist Party, and gave the President authority to seek an 80-day "cooling off" period before a strike that would imperil the national health or safety—the Waterfront Employers Association (WEA) tried to provoke a strike. They hoped to rid themselves of Bridges and reclaim control over the hiring hall. As it turned out, the strategy was a failure. After replacing their bargaining representatives and enduring a 95-day strike, the WEA reached a new extended agreement with the ILWU.

At the same time, Philip Murray, Lewis' successor as head of the CIO, had started reducing Bridges' power within the CIO, removing him in 1948 from his position as California Regional Director. In 1950, after an internal trial, the CIO expelled the ILWU due to its alleged "communist domination".

=== Coping with change ===
Expulsion had no real effect, however, on either the ILWU or Bridges' power within it. The organization continued to negotiate agreements, with less strife than in the 1930s and 1940s, and Bridges continued to be reelected without serious opposition. The union negotiated a groundbreaking agreement in 1960, that permitted the extensive mechanization of the docks. Its leadership agreed to significantly reducing the number of longshore workers in return for generous job guarantees and benefits for those displaced by the changes.

The agreement, however, highlighted the lesser status of less senior members, known as "B-men." Bridges reacted defensively to these workers' complaints, which had additional sting because many of the "B-men" were black and had worked hard to enter the union. The additional longshore work produced by the Vietnam War allowed Bridges to meet the challenge by opening up more jobs and making determined efforts to recruit black applicants. The ILWU later faced similar challenges from women, who found it even harder to enter the industry and the union.

Bridges had difficulty giving up his position in the ILWU. He explored the possibility of merging it with the ILA or the Teamsters in the early 1970s. He retired in 1977 after ensuring that Louis Goldblatt, the long-time Secretary-Treasurer of the union and his logical successor but whom he opposed, was denied the opportunity to replace him.

== Personal life and death ==
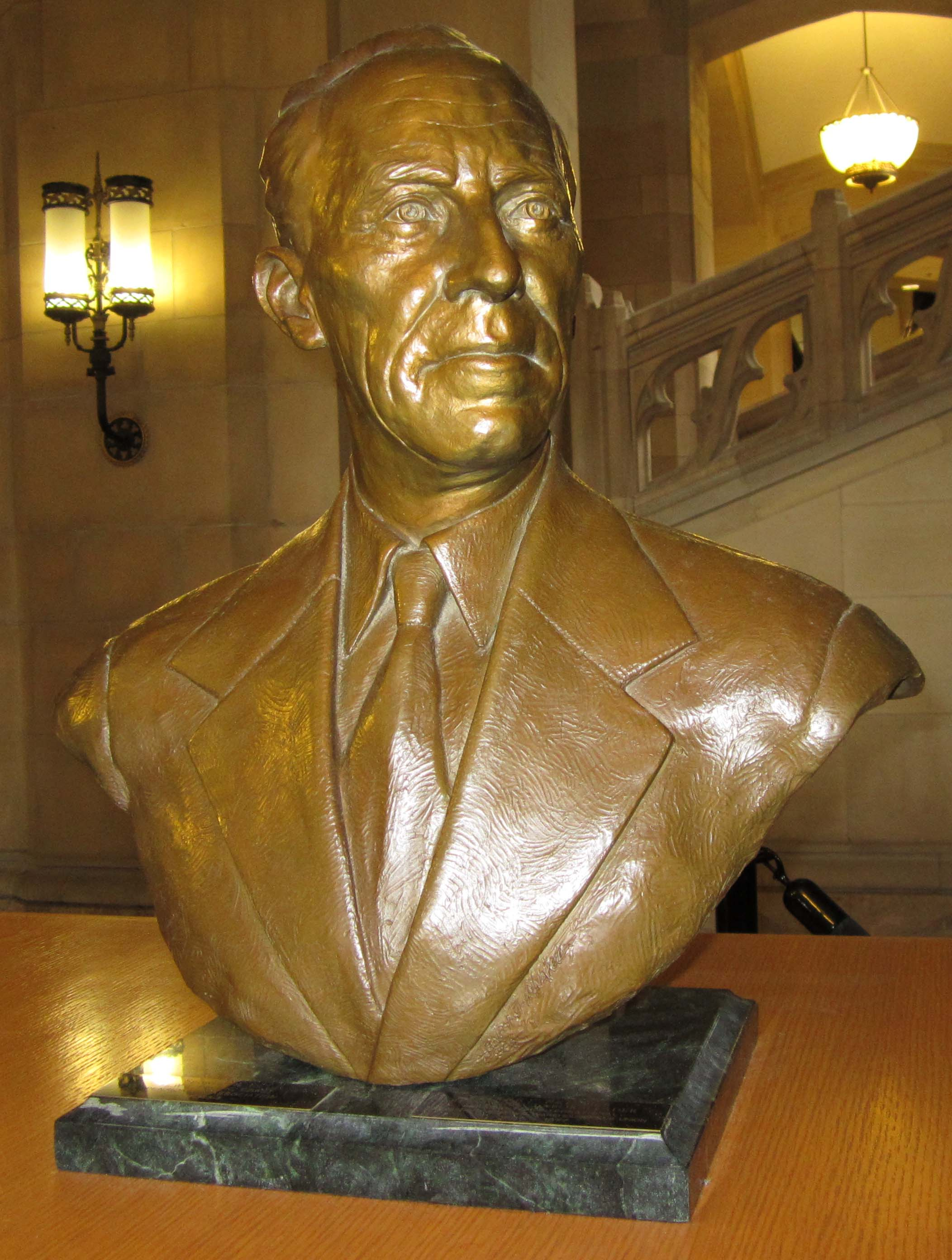
A bust of Bridges in the Suzzallo Library at the University of Washington

In 1923, Harry Bridges initiated a relationship with Agnes Brown, a waitress he met in Marshfield (Coos Bay), Oregon. They had a daughter together and lived as an unmarried couple for twelve years. They formally married in 1934 shortly before the West Coast Waterfront Strike began. Their relationship deteriorated as Harry became a more prominent leader in the union, and they divorced in 1945. In a series of nasty and highly publicized divorce hearings, both accused the other of physical violence. Harry accused Agnes of alcoholism, and Agnes claimed Harry had fathered a child with Nancy Berdecio. Agnes was later paid by the FBI to testify against Harry in his deportation trials.

In the mid-1930's, Bridges was rumored to have had an affair with his secretary, Norma Perry, who later worked for and had a relationship with Harry Lundeberg. Some speculation suggests that Norma Perry was an underlying reason for Bridges' split with Lundeberg during the 1936-37 Pacific Coast Maritime Strike.

In 1940, Bridges met Nancy Fenton Berdecio, a one-time professional dancer, while traveling in New York City. In 1943, Berdecio became pregnant with a child fathered by Bridges, though he denied paternity in his divorce hearing with Agnes. After finalizing his divorce, Harry and Nancy married in 1946. They divorced after eight years of marriage. They had one additional child.

Bridges met Noriko "Nikki" Sawada in San Francisco, when introduced by her employer, Charles Garry, a civil rights lawyer. They were attending a fund-raiser for mine, mill, and smelter workers. The two later became a couple. In 1958, the couple decided to marry in Reno, Nevada but, at the county courthouse, the clerk refused to issue them a marriage license because Sawada was ethnic Japanese. Nevada had an 1846 statute banning marriage between a white person and "any person of the Ethiopian or black race, Malay or brown race, Mongolian or yellow race, or American Indian, or red race." Bridges and Sawada asked the Federal District Court to order the marriage license be issued. Judge Taylor Wines granted the order and the couple married on 10 December 1958. This order prompted the Nevada legislature to repeal the state's anti-miscegenation laws on 17 March 1959.

Harry Bridges died at age 88 on 30 March 1990.

== Legacy ==
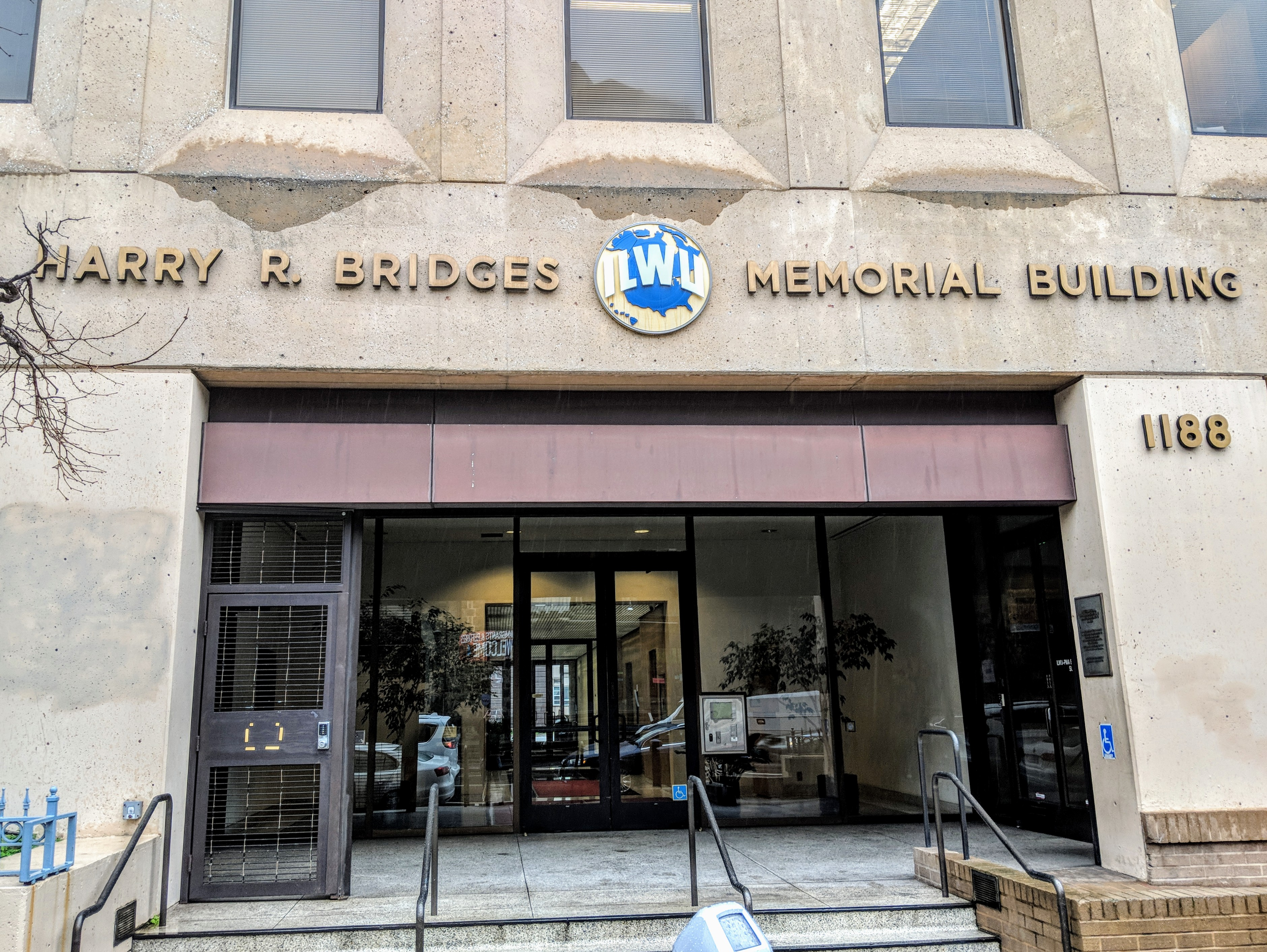
ILWU Headquarters in San Francisco, named for Bridges

The ILWU headquarters in San Francisco was renamed the Harry R. Bridges Memorial Building shortly after his death.

On the West Coast, Bridges' influence still excites passions both for and against the labor movement.

The Harry Bridges Institute in San Pedro, California, is a research institute that focuses on topics of international economics and how changes in political geography affect unions. The archives of the Harry Bridges Institute are held in the University Library at California State University, Northridge. The Harry Bridges Center for Labor Studies at the University of Washington (UW) in Seattle, Washington, was established in Bridges' honor in 1992 by ILWU past and current ILWU members. The center supports research, teaching, and community outreach by UW faculty and students and labor organizations.

Harry Bridges Span School, in the harbor town of Wilmington, California, is named after him, as is Harry Bridges Blvd (also in Wilmington), which runs along the north side of the Port of Los Angeles.

In 1941, The Almanac Singers, including Woody Guthrie and Pete Seeger, recorded "Song for Bridges" while working on their album Talking Union that defends Bridges' work. In 1994, Rancid, a band from Oakland, California, released a song titled "Harry Bridges" on their album Let's Go following their song "Union Blood" on their 1993 Rancid.

California Governor Gray Davis declared 28 July 2001, which would have been Bridges' 100th birthday, to be "Harry Bridges Day." On the same day, the City of San Francisco dedicated a plaza near the San Francisco Ferry Building in Bridges' honor. Concurrently, the ILWU organized a week-long event celebrating the life of the union leader. This culminated in Los Angeles in a march of roughly 8,000 unionists and supporters across the Vincent Thomas Bridge from Terminal Island to San Pedro, California. The longshoremen shut down the port for eight hours in honor of Bridges.

In 2009, the nonprofit Harry Bridges Project produced From Wharf Rats to Lords of the Docks: The Life and Times of Harry Bridges, a one-man play that was directed and filmed by Haskell Wexler. It promotes Bridges' legacy and the influence of his work. The film was broadcast on some PBS stations on Labor Day Weekend in 2009.

In 2010, the Long Beach City Council changed the name of the Queen Mary Events Park to the Harry Bridges Memorial Park.
