= The Labor Press Project =

The Labor Press Project: Pacific Northwest Labor and Radical Newspapers is a multimedia website housing thousands of digitized articles and editions from the late 19th century to the present. Newspapers and newsletters from unions, early socialist groupings, anarchist communes, ethnic community groups and radical organization are presented on the site with accompanying research articles on their context and evolution. Many of the digitized materials were previously unavailable except as archival material. The extensive resource is one of Pacific Northwest Labor and Civil Rights History Projects developed by the University of Washington.

== Content ==
The materials cataloged are framed by two articles, "The Labor and Radical Press 1820-The Present" and "The Squabbling Socialists of Washington State", which provides an overview of the socialist movement – considered one of the nation's strongest – in the region during the first two decades of the 20th century. Digitized materials include editions of the newsletter published by the union of Boeing workers during World War II, the IWW’s Industrial Worker, publications created during the tumultuous waterfront, press and timber strikes of the Great Depression, newspapers published by early 20th century communes in Washington and newspapers of Seattle's Asian, black, Filipino and Jewish communities.

== See also ==
- Alternative media (U.S. political left)
