= 1922 Portland waterfront strike =

1922 labor strike in Portland, Oregon, U.S.

The Portland Waterfront strike of 1922 was a labor strike conducted by the International Longshoremen's Association which took place in Portland, Oregon, from late April to late June 1922. The strike was ineffective at closing down the Port of Portland due to strikebreakers, and on June 22 the strike ended with the employers dictating terms.

== Background ==
=== The Wobblies ===
The Industrial Workers of the World (IWW), whose members were known as the Wobblies, was a labor union founded in 1905. They were one of the most active unions in America, and they strongly opposed World War I. The Wobblies showed up in Oregon around the 1907 in logging and millworkers, and they found their center in Portland. The Wobblies' leader in Portland at the time was accused of murder, making other unions distance themselves from them.

Conservatives hated the IWW. They blamed them for all the waterfront crime as well as the brothels there. During 1917 the government suppressed the IWW as an organization. The war needed vast supplies of lumber and copper. The IWW represented thousands of lumbermen and miners. The Wilson Government turned the logging industry to the control of U.S. Army. In 1919, during the Red Scare, the meeting hall of the IWW was seized after Oregon passed a "criminal syndicalism" law in 1919.

In 1920 many of the Wobblies who weren't killed or jailed changed trades from the lumber industry to maritime work. These men started working as sailors or longshoremen, and joined unions like the International Longshoremen's Association (ILA) and the Sailors' Union of the Pacific (SUP). The Wobblies brought their industrial unionism with them by song and file membership, but the leaders of the maritime unions kept their tradition of craft unionism.

=== The ILA ===
The International Longshoremen's Association (ILA) was established in Portland Oregon around 1909, and it was not a strong union yet. The whole reason why this union was established was to fight the seamen who had begun to do longshoremen's work. The seamen had a contract with ship owners that stated that they could work a ship even if the longshoremen were part of a union. This is how the ILA got their foot in the door in Portland, Oregon.

The ILA was the original union in Portland, and they were a craft union. The only way for people to be able to be in this union was either to be related to one of the longshoremen or to be friendly with longshoremen. The men who were nonunion members got the toughest jobs, while the union members got it easy. There was only around 250 unionized longshoremen, and there was 800 affiliated nonunion member. These standards to obtain membership into their union would make it difficult for former Wobblies to get in.

== The strike ==
In 1922 the strike began when the ILA's contract with the employers of the longshoremen ended, and the employers told their employees that they would be taking charge of who they were going to be hiring. This meant that the employer could hire nonunion workers before union members, and would make it difficult for the 250 union members to get employment from their former bosses. The ILA members walked out on strike, closing the Port of Portland for a week, but the employers brought in strike breakers, who slept on a ship in order to avoid crossing the picket line.

Many of the strike breakers were the Wobblies who were unable to join the ILA union, because they were not friends or related to the longshoremen in that union. They used breaking the strike to get back at the ILA union members, and violence soon broke out between strikers and strike breakers. The violence led to the employers to getting a court order that stopped any gatherings of union members in certain places.

The strike of 1922 on the Portland, OR waterfront started at the end of April until the end of June. The longshoremen of ILA accused the employers of trying to take control of the loading and unloading the cargo by forcing their own employment system to do all the hiring. The longshoremen nicked named the new system Fink Hall, and they thought this would destroy their union. This new hiring system was the last straw for the longshoremen of ILA, and it was why they went on strike.

The strike ended on the 22nd of June with the employers laying down the terms of the strike ending. They made it to where there was one hall that did joint hiring of both non-union and union hiring, and it was supposed to be a fair way of hiring without having two separate hiring halls to hire workers. The hall had union and non-union representatives in it to keep the hiring as fair as possible.

== Aftermath ==
The ILA union gained nothing from this strike, and they were only able to put the waterfront out of commission for a week. In this strike the employer was the real champion, because they were able to put a stop to the ILA union itself. After 1922 ILA was not longer operational in Portland, and all that remained of the union was the name International Longshoremen Association. The employers had killed the unions on the Portland waterfront, and for now had nothing to worry about when it came to hiring their dock workers. This new system of hiring would create new conflict that would rise again in another 11 years, and would be a reference for the Portland water strike of 1933.

The Wobblies were also winners of this strike, because they had been a part of the strike breakers. When they went to the hiring hall they were chosen over the ILA workers, and this would also help the conflict grow over the years into 1933. Two conflicting unions that were now un- operational, because of employers wanting to take control over the hiring system. They were forced to compete for work now in the maritime trade, and the conflict would grow between the workers.
