= Seattle General Strike =

1919 workers' strike in Seattle, Washington

- Part of the First Red Scare
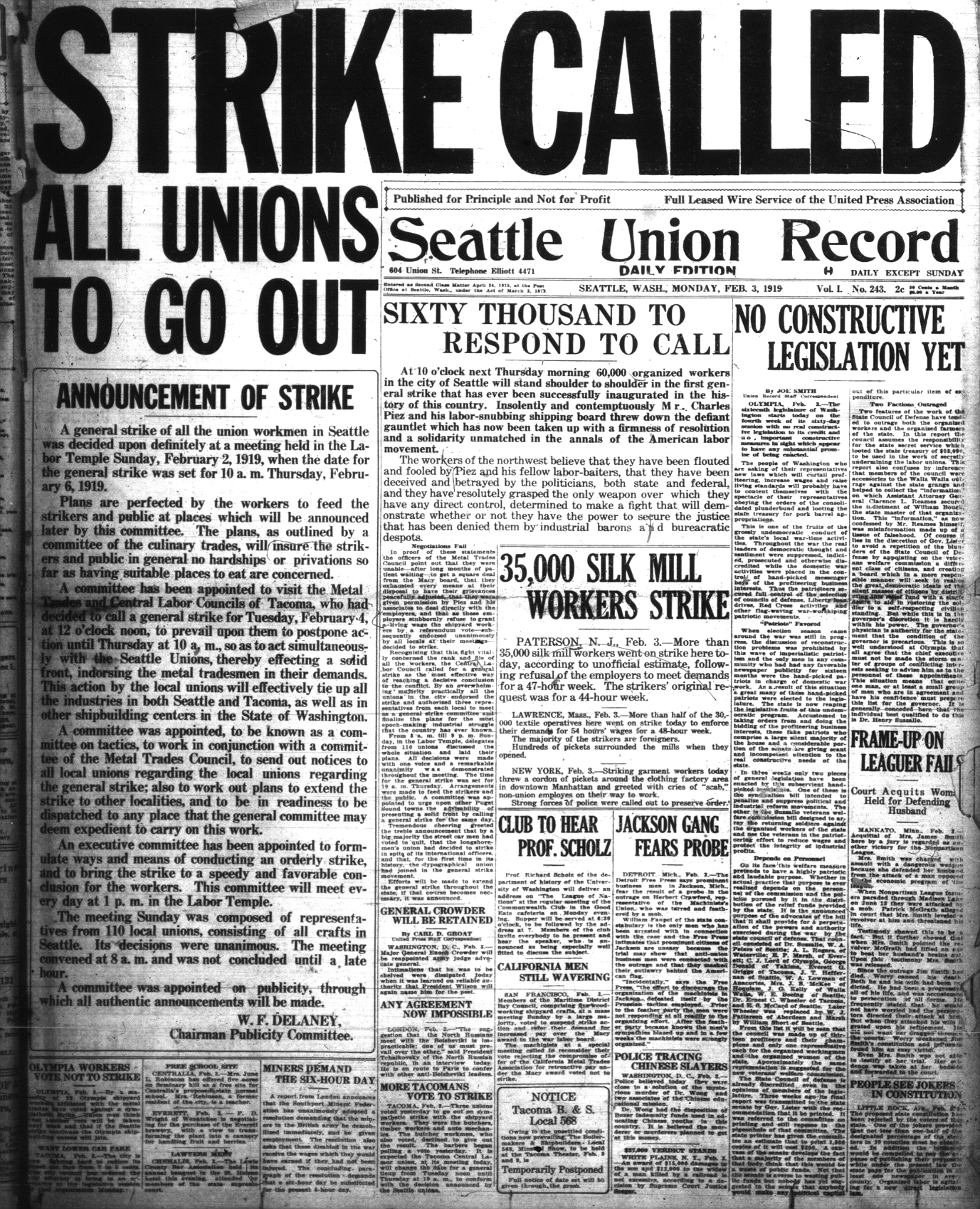
- Union Record Monday, February 3, 1919
- Date: February 6–11, 1919
- Location: Seattle, Washington
- Caused by: Inspiration from the Russian Revolution; As a show of solidarity with shipyard workers
- Goals: Pay increases
- Result: Arrests of strikers, charges later dropped; Foundation of several cooperatives after, including a cooperative bank; Build up of the First Red Scare

The Seattle General Strike was a five-day general work stoppage by 65,000 workers in the city of Seattle, Washington, from February 6 to 11, 1919. The goal was to support shipyard workers in several unions who were locked out of their jobs when they tried to strike for higher wages. Most other local unions joined the walk-out, including members of the American Federation of Labor (AFL) and the Industrial Workers of the World (IWW). The national offices of the AFL unions were opposed to the shutdown. Local, state and federal government officials, the press, and much of the public viewed the strike as a radical attempt to subvert American institutions.

The strike's demand for higher wages came within months of the end of World War I, the original justification for the wage controls. From 1915 to 1918, Seattle had seen a big increase in union membership, and some union leaders were inspired by the Russian Revolution of 1917. Some commentators blamed the strike on Bolsheviks and other radicals inspired by "un-American" ideologies, making it the first expression of the anti-left sentiment that characterized the First Red Scare of 1919 and 1920.

== Background ==
In these years, more workers in the city were organized in unions than ever before. There was a 400 percent increase in union membership from 1915 to 1918. At the time, workers in the United States, particularly in the Pacific Northwest, were becoming increasingly radicalized, with many in the rank and file supportive of the recent revolution in Russia and working toward a similar revolution in the United States. In the fall of 1919, for instance, Seattle longshoremen refused to load arms destined for the anti-Bolshevik White Army in Russia and attacked those who attempted to load them.

The arrival of the Russian steamship Shilka in Seattle on December 24, 1917, added to the thought of Bolshevik involvement. The ship had been damaged and thrown off course in a storm and limped its way into the port almost out of fuel, food and fresh water. The U.S. Attorney in Seattle was tipped off by an "informant" that the ship was coming and it was going to "aid the enemy." The enemy at this time would have been the labor parties threatening a strike. Many believed that its arrival signified a Bolshevik connection with the labor unrest in Seattle. A lot of rumors came about because of this ship's arrival. The Seattle Post-Intelligencer ran a front-page article about an I.W.W. ship being held that contained over a hundred thousand dollars to help I.W.W. members get out of jail. This article proved to be false as the search of the vessel by local law enforcement turned up nothing of significance. A first-hand account of a sailor aboard the ship claimed that there was no evidence found on board because the only contentious material was some flyers in a briefcase that were carried off of the ship upon its arrival. Another passenger that arrived with the ship was arrested for taking part in labor talks with one of the unions in the area. Although there was never any concrete evidence connecting the Shilka to the labor parties of Seattle, there was enough to show that the labor parties at the least had the support of Bolshevik Russia. There was a lot of fear of the Bolsheviks because it was known that they had been hoping for a revolution in the Western world in order to support Russia by pooling resources.

Most unions in Seattle were officially affiliated with the AFL, but the ideas of ordinary workers tended to be more radical than their leaders. A local labor leader from the time discussed the politics of Seattle's workers in June 1919:

I believe that 95 percent of us agree that the workers should control the industries. Nearly all of us agree on that but very strenuously disagree on the method. Some of us think we can get control through the Cooperative movement, some of us think through political action, and others think through industrial action.

Another journalist described the spread of propaganda relating to the Russian Revolution:

For some time these pamphlets were seen by hundreds on Seattle's streetcars and ferries, read by men of the shipyards on their way to work. Seattle's businessmen commented on the phenomenon sourly; it was plain to everyone that these workers were conscientiously and energetically studying how to organize their coming to power. Already, workers in Seattle talked about "workers' power" as a practical policy for the not far distant future.

== Strike ==
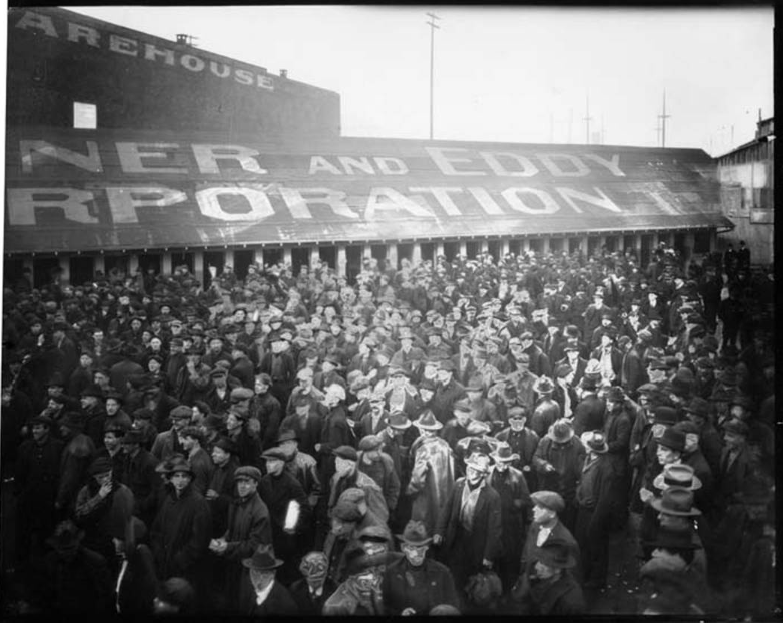
Seattle shipyard workers leave the shipyard after going on strike, 1919.

A few weeks after the November 1918 armistice ended World War I, unions in Seattle's shipbuilding industry demanded a pay increase for unskilled workers. They formed the Seattle Metal Trades Council, made up of delegates from twenty-one different craft unions; there were seventeen at the time of the first strike vote. At the time of the General Strike, these separate unions no longer made separate agreements with the yard-owners; a single blanket-agreement was made at intervals by the Metal Trades Council for all the crafts comprising it. In August 1917, the workers had succeeded in establishing a uniform wage scale for one third of the metal tradesmen working in the city. At the time of the general strike, James Taylor was president of the council.

In an attempt to divide the ranks of the union, the yard owners responded by offering a pay increase only to skilled workers. The union rejected that offer and Seattle's 35,000 shipyard workers went on strike on January 21, 1919.

Controversy erupted when Charles Piez, head of the Emergency Fleet Corporation (EFC), an enterprise created by the federal government as a wartime measure and the largest employer in the industry, sent a telegram to the yard owners threatening to withdraw their contracts if any increase in wages were granted. The message intended for the Metal Trades Association, the owners, was accidentally delivered to the Metal Trades Council, the union. The shipyard workers responded with anger directed at both their employers and the federal government which, through the EFC, seemed to be siding with corporate interests.

The workers immediately appealed to the Seattle Central Labor Council for a general strike of all workers in Seattle. Members of various unions were polled, with almost unanimous support in favor–even among traditionally conservative unions. As many as 110 locals officially supported the call for a general strike to begin on February 6, 1919, at 10:00 am. Among the strikers were war veterans who wore their uniforms as they went on strike.

== Life during the strike ==
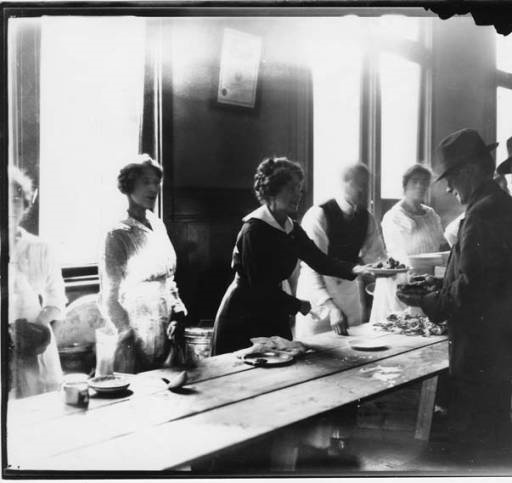
The strike committee set up soup kitchens and distributed as many as 30,000 meals each day. In the photo, a woman serves a plate of food to a striking worker.

A cooperative body made up of rank and file workers from all the striking locals were formed during the strike, called the General Strike Committee. It acted as a "virtual counter-government for the city." The committee organized to provide essential services for the people of Seattle during the work stoppage. For instance, garbage that would create a health hazard was collected, laundry workers continued to handle hospital laundry, and firemen remained on duty. Exemptions to the stoppage of labor had to be passed by the Strike Committee, and authorized vehicles bore signs to that effect. In general, work was not halted if doing so would endanger lives.

In other cases, workers acted on their own initiative to create new institutions. Milk wagon drivers, after being denied the right by their employers to keep certain dairies open, established a distribution system of 35 neighborhood milk stations. A system of food distribution was also established, which throughout the strike committee distributed as many as 30,000 meals each day. Strikers paid twenty-five cents per meal, and the general public paid thirty-five cents. Beef stew, spaghetti, bread, and coffee were offered on an all-you-can-eat basis.

Army veterans created an alternative to the police in order to maintain order. A group called the "Labor War Veteran's Guard" forbade the use of force and did not carry weapons, and used "persuasion only." Peacekeeping proved unnecessary. The regular police forces made no arrests in actions related to the strike, and general arrests dropped to less than half their normal number. Major General John F. Morrison, stationed in Seattle, claimed that he had never seen "a city so quiet and orderly." The methods of organization adopted by the striking workers bore resemblance to anarcho-syndicalism, perhaps reflecting the influence of the Industrial Workers of the World in the Pacific Northwest, though only a few striking locals were officially affiliated with the IWW.

== Radical visions ==
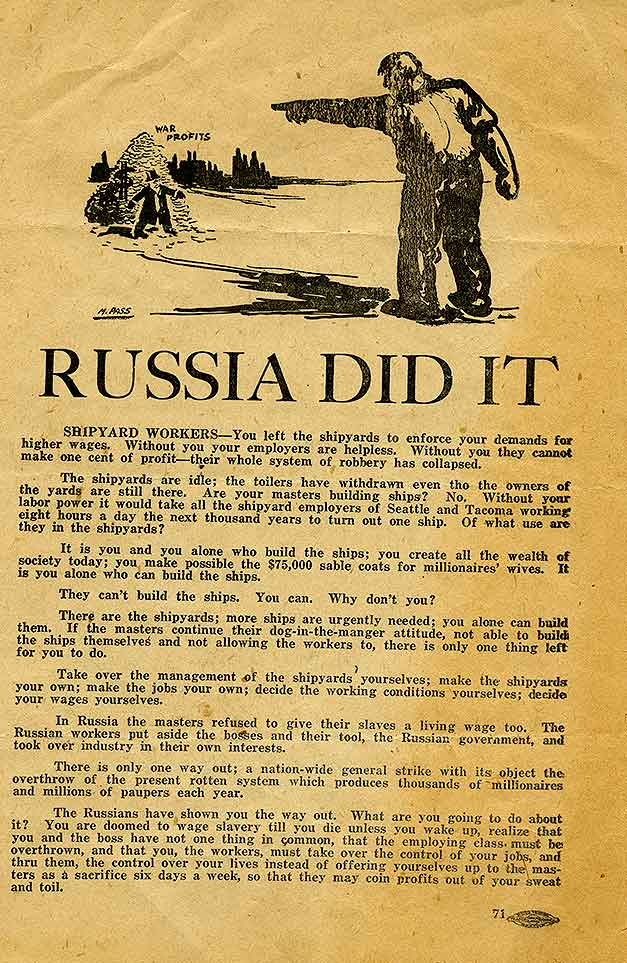
The pamphlet entitled "Russia Did It."

Revolutionary pamphlets littered the streets of the city. One called "Russia Did It" proclaimed: "The Russians have shown you the way out. What are you going to do about it? You are doomed to wage slavery till you die unless you wake up, realize that you and the boss have nothing in common, that the employing class must be overthrown, and that you, the workers, must take over the control of your jobs, and through them, the control over your lives instead of offering yourself up to the masters as a sacrifice six days a week, so that they may coin profits out of your sweat and toil."

In an editorial in the Seattle Union Record, a union newspaper, pro-Soviet activist Anna Louise Strong, although not a union member tried to use the general strike's power and potential to have the workers seize the industries of Seattle:

The closing down of Seattle's industries, as a MERE SHUTDOWN, will not affect these eastern gentlemen much. They could let the whole northwest go to pieces, as far as money alone is concerned.

But, the closing down of the capitalistically controlled industries of Seattle, while the workers organize to feed the people, to care for the babies and the sick, to preserve order – this will move them, for this looks too much like the taking over of power by the workers.

Labor will not only Shut Down the industries, but Labor will reopen, under the management of the appropriate trades, such activities as are needed to preserve public health and public peace. If the strike continues, Labor may feel led to avoid public suffering by reopening more and more activities.

UNDER ITS OWN MANAGEMENT.

And that is why we say that we are starting on a road that leads – no one knows where!

Newspapers across the country reprinted excerpts from Strong's editorial.

== End of the general strike ==
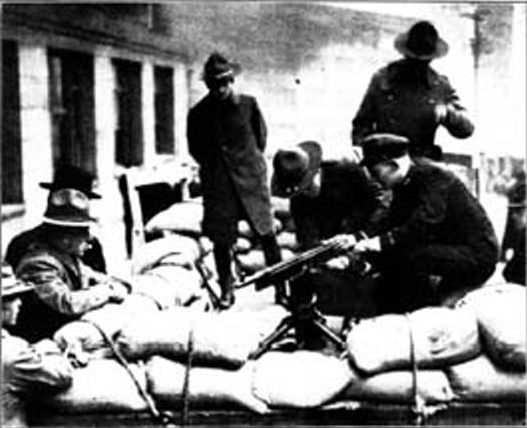
Police setting up a mounted machine gun during the strike.

Three simultaneous movements brought the strike to an end: Mayor Ole Hanson increased the police and military forces available to enforce order, though there was no disorder, and possibly to take the place of striking workers. Union officials, especially those more senior and those at higher levels of the labor movement, feared that using the general strike as a tactic would fail and set back their organizing efforts. Union members, perhaps seeing the strength of the forces arrayed against them, perhaps mindful of their union leaders concerns began to go back to work. The General Strike Committee attributed the end of the strike to pressure from international union officers and the difficulty of continuing to live in the shut-down city.

Mayor Hanson had federal troops available and stationed 950 sailors and marines across the city by February 7. He added 600 men to the police force and hired 2,400 special deputies, students from the University of Washington for the most part. On February 7, Mayor Hanson threatened to use 1,500 police and 1,500 troops to replace striking workers the next day, but the strikers assumed this was an empty threat and were proved correct. The Mayor continued his rhetorical attack on February 9, saying that the "sympathetic strike was called in the exact manner as was the revolution in Petrograd." Mayor Hanson told reporters that "any man who attempts to take over the control of the municipal government functions will be shot."

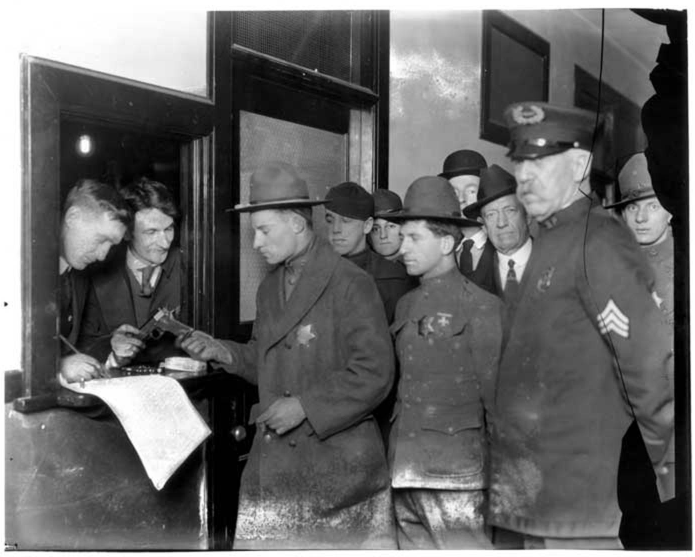
The mayor's newly hired deputies receive their weapons.

The international offices of some of the unions and the national leadership of the AFL began to exert pressure on the General Strike Committee and individual unions to end the strike. Some locals gave in to this pressure and returned to work. The executive committee of the General Strike Committee, pressured by the AFL and international labor organizations, proposed ending the general strike at midnight on February 8, but their recommendation was voted down by the General Strike Committee. On February 8, some streetcar operators returned to work and restored some critical city transportation services. Seattle's main department store reopened as well. Then teamsters and newsboys returned to work. On February 10, the General Strike Committee voted to end the general strike on February 11 and by noon on that day it was over. It stated its reasons: "Pressure from international officers of unions, from executive committees of unions, from the 'leaders' in the labor movement, even from those very leaders who are still called 'Bolsheviki' by the undiscriminating press. And, added to all these, the pressure upon the workers themselves, not of the loss of their own jobs, but of living in a city so tightly closed."

The city had been effectively paralyzed for five days, but the general strike collapsed as labor reconsidered its effectiveness under pressure from senior labor leaders and their own obvious failure to match the Mayor's propaganda in the war for public opinion. The shipyard strike, in support of which the general strike had been called, persisted.

== Aftermath ==
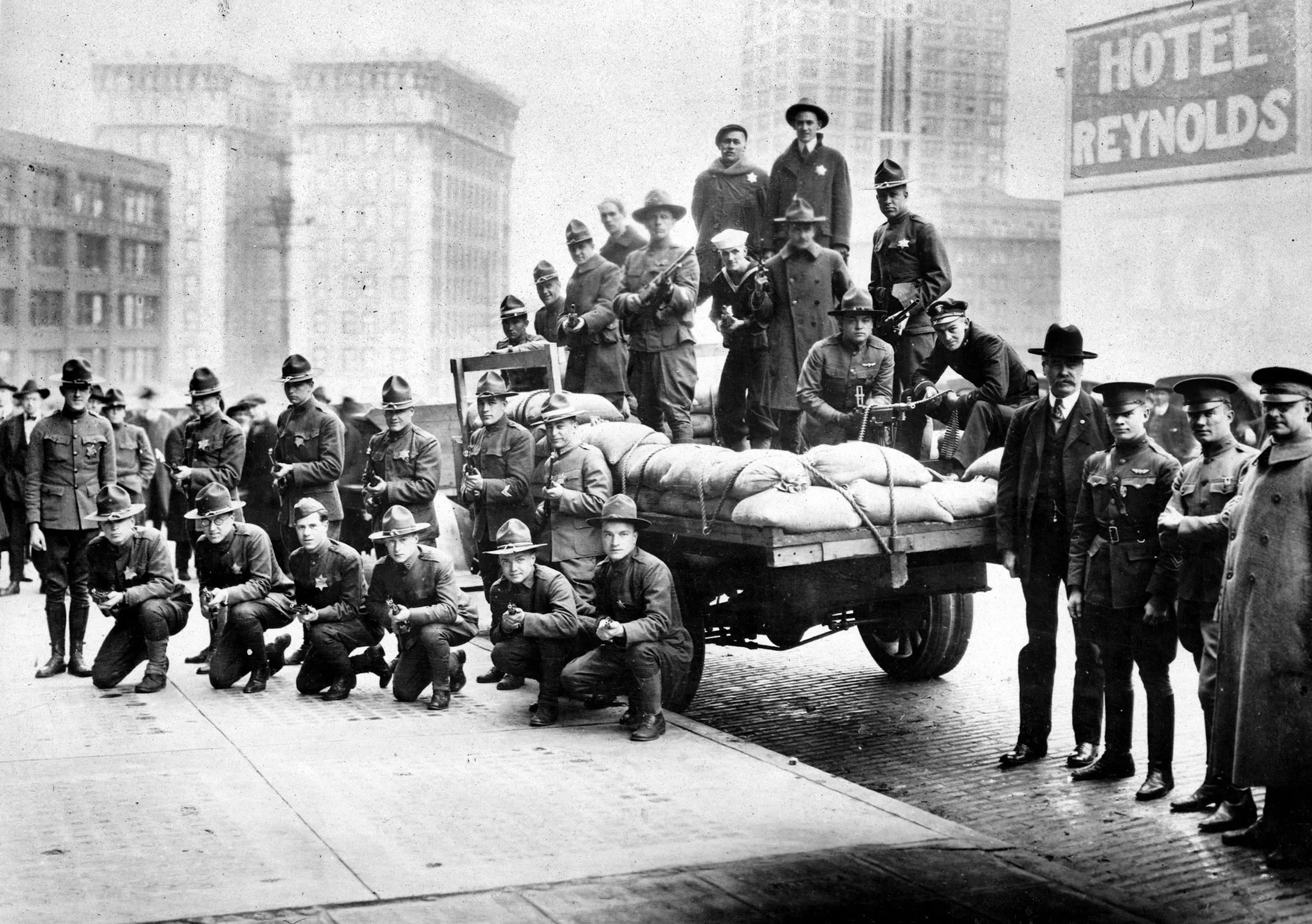
Newspaper caption, "How the Great Seattle Strike was broken - Our photo shows machine gun crews ready to fire upon the strikers. Police, soldiers and armed civilians were used by Mayor Hanson"

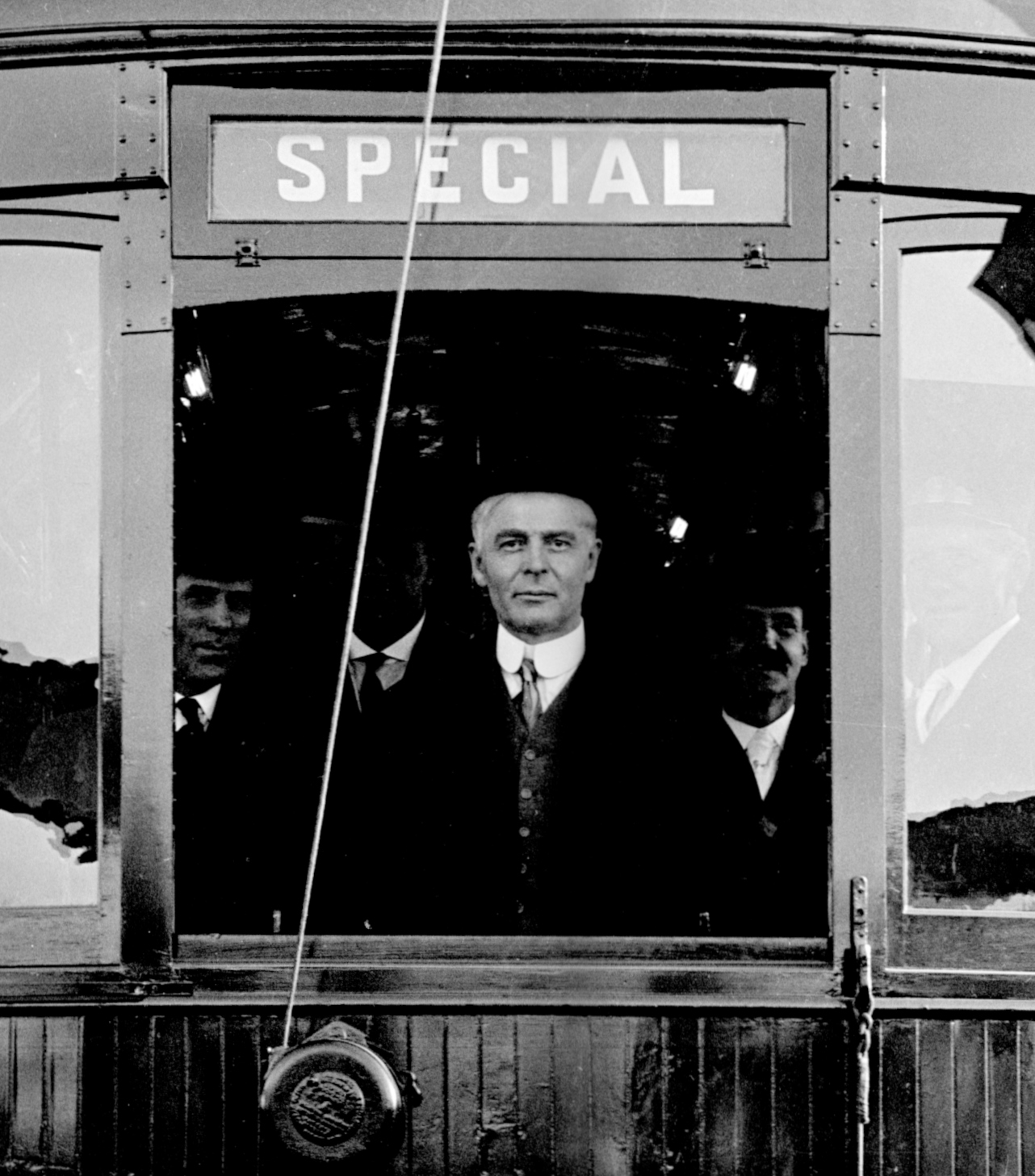
Hanson, July 1, 1919

Immediately following the general strike's end, thirty-nine IWW members were arrested as "ringleaders of anarchy".

Seattle Mayor Ole Hanson took credit for ending the strike and was hailed by some of the press. He resigned a few months later and toured the country giving lectures on the dangers of "domestic Bolshevism." He earned $38,000 in seven months, five times his annual salary as mayor. He agreed that the general strike was a revolutionary event. In his view, the fact that it was peaceful proved its revolutionary nature and intent. He wrote:

The so-called sympathetic Seattle strike was an attempted revolution. That there was no violence does not alter the fact... The intent, openly and covertly announced, was for the overthrow of the industrial system; here first, then everywhere... True, there were no flashing guns, no bombs, no killings. Revolution, I repeat, doesn't need violence. The general strike, as practised in Seattle, is of itself the weapon of revolution, all the more dangerous because quiet. To succeed, it must suspend everything; stop the entire life stream of a community... That is to say, it puts the government out of operation. And that is all there is to revolt—no matter how achieved.

Between the strike's announcement and beginning, on February 4, the U.S. Senate voted to expand the work of its Overman Judiciary Subcommittee from investigating German spies to Bolshevik propaganda. The committee launched a month of hearings on February 11, the day the strike collapsed. Its sensational report detailed Bolshevik atrocities and the threat of domestic agitators bent on revolution and the abolition of private property. The labor radicalism represented by the Seattle General Strike fit neatly into its conception of the threat American institutions faced.

== See also ==
- 1916 West Coast waterfront strike – Labor strike on the US West Coast
- Everett Massacre – 1916 gunfight in Everett, Washington, US
- May Day riots of 1919 – Riots in Cleveland, Ohio

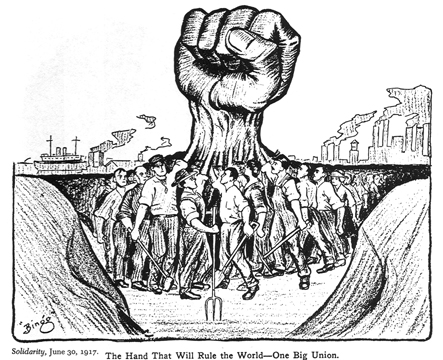
The 'Wobblies' (IWW) joined the general strike and advocated for One Big Union.
