= History of San Francisco (Refregier) =

Murals by Anton Refregier in San Francisco, California

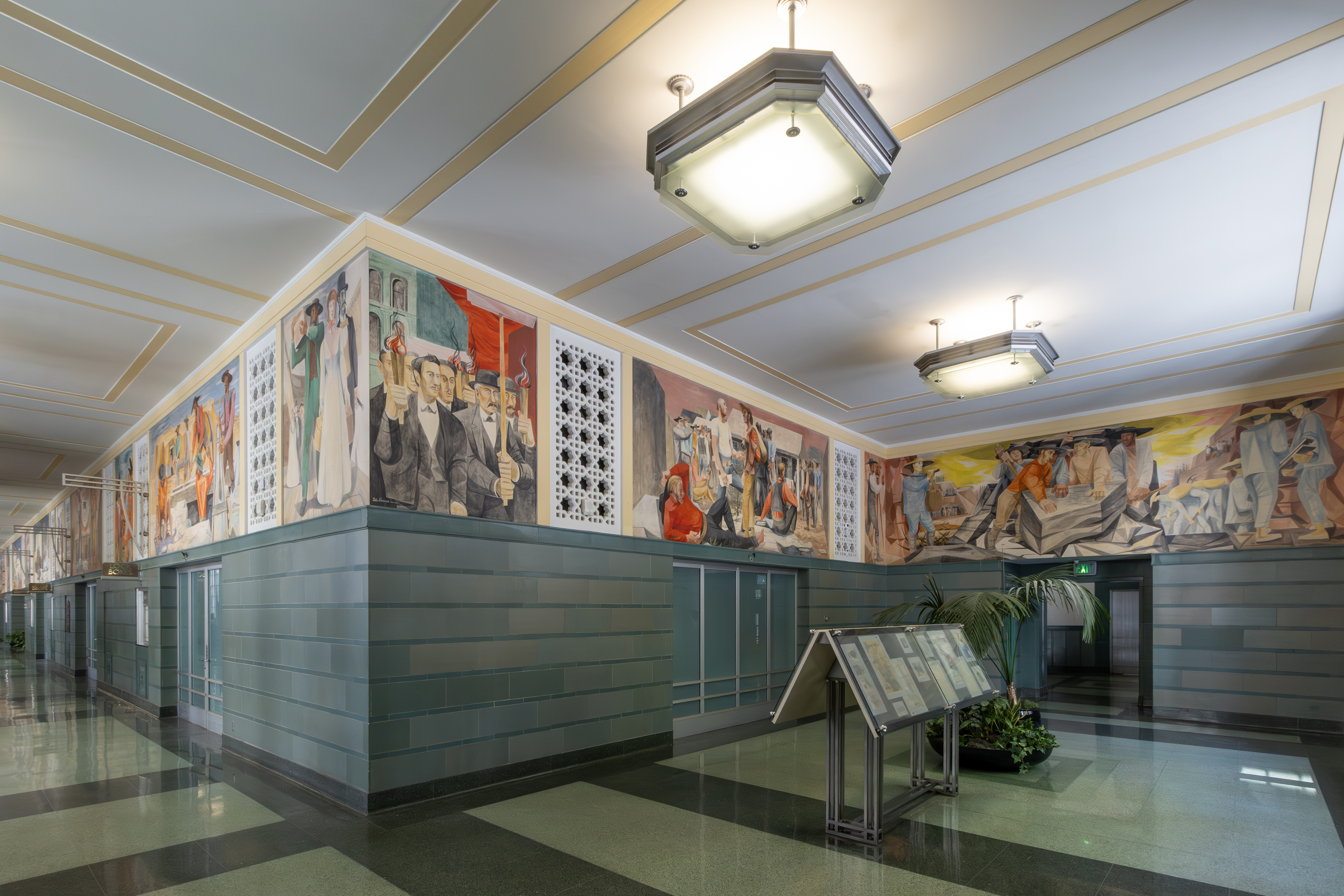
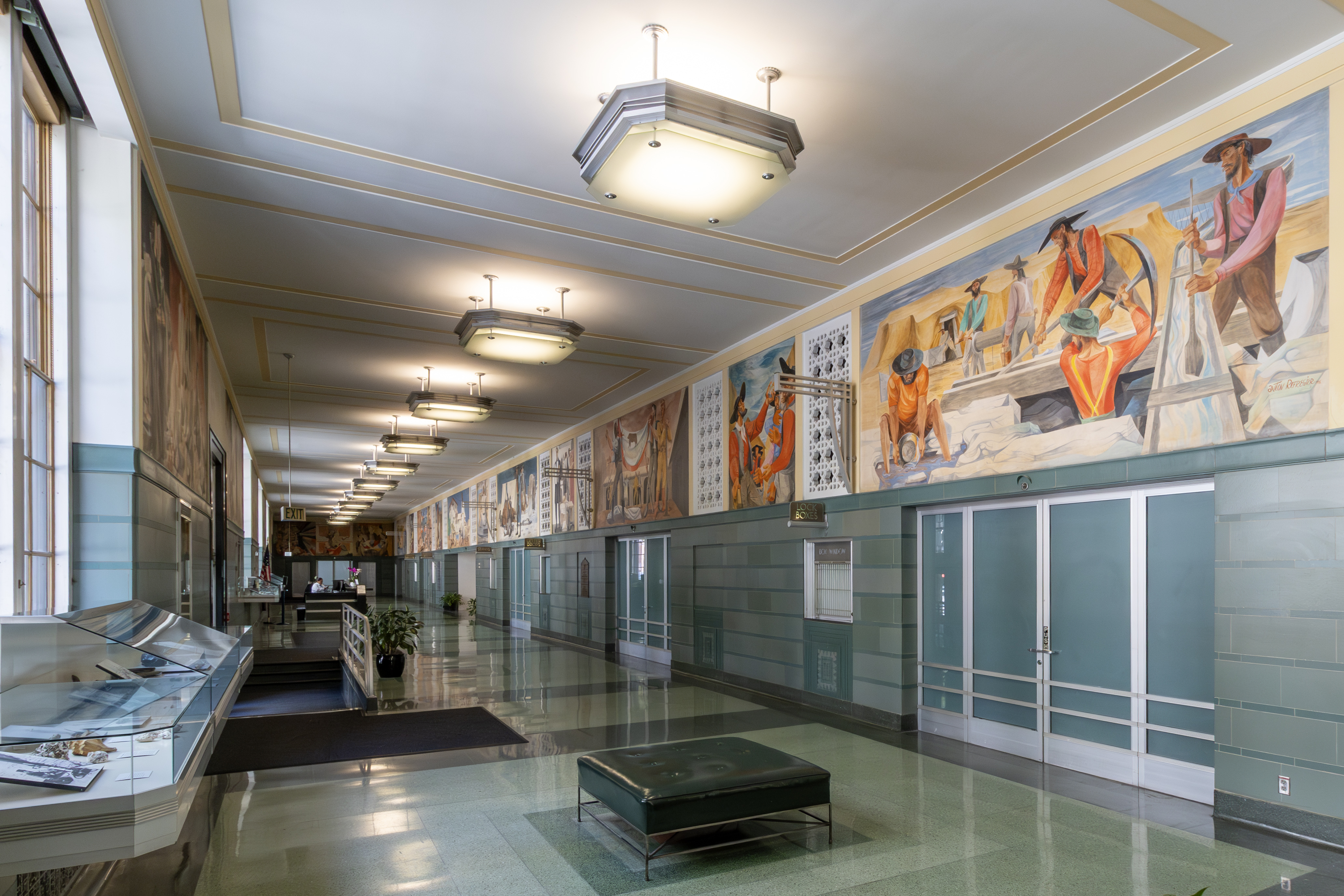
- Lobbies of the Rincon Annex Post Office (now Rincon Center) with Refregier's History of San Francisco mural series lining the frieze. Top: View southeast in Spear St lobby Bottom: View northeast in Mission St lobby
- Artist: Anton Refregier
- Completion date: 1948
- Medium: Mural, egg tempera on gesso
- Subject: History of San Francisco; History of California
- Dimensions: 2.06 m × 120 m (6.75 ft × 400 ft)
- Location: San Francisco
- Owner: Hudson Pacific Properties
- Rincon Annex
- U.S. National Register of Historic Places
- San Francisco Designated Landmark
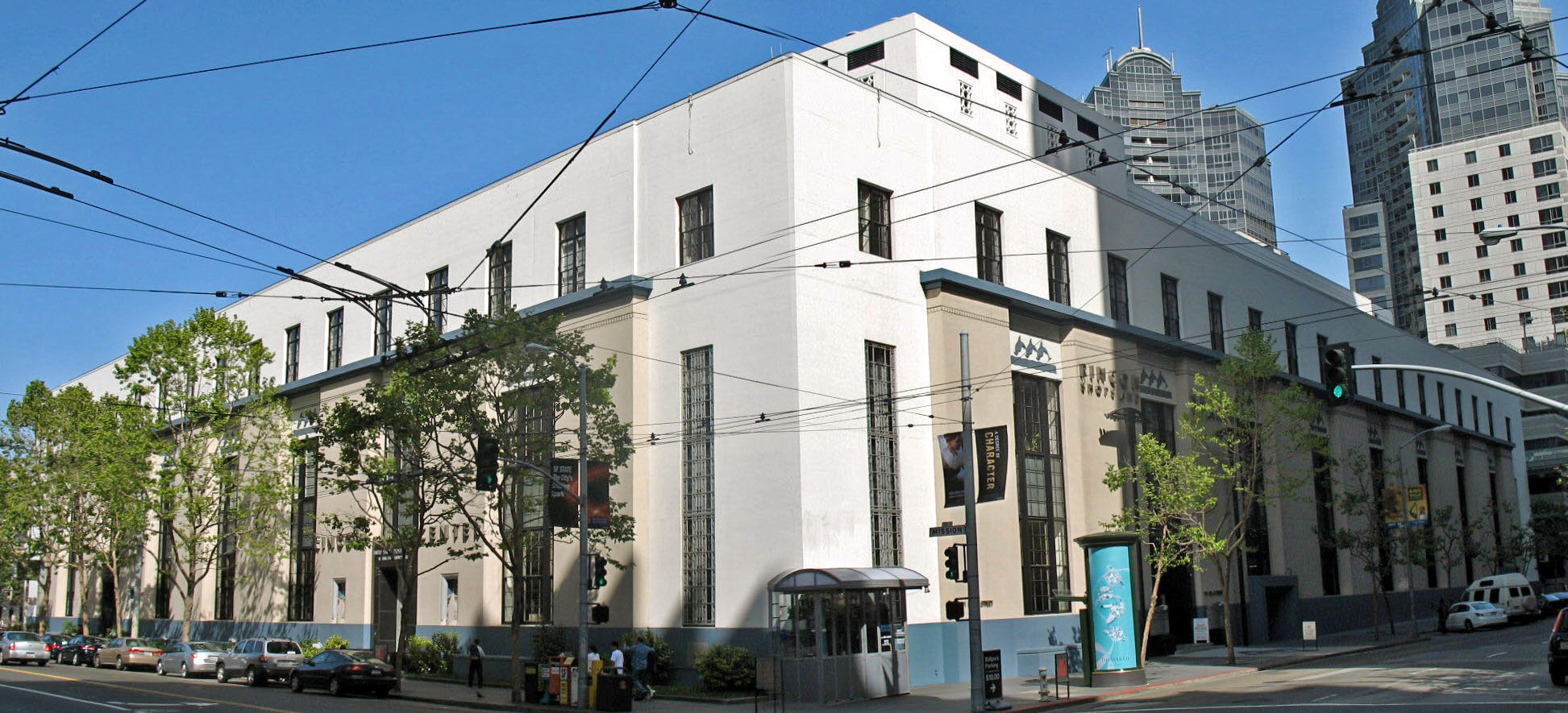
- Rincon Center in 2008, view directed east from the corner of Mission and Spear

- Location within San Francisco Location within San Francisco Bay Area Location within California
- Location: 101--199 Mission St., San Francisco, California
- Coordinates: 37°47′33″N 122°23′31″W
- Area: 1.9 acres (0.77 ha)
- Built: 1940
- Built by: George A. Fuller Construction Co.
- Architect: Gilbert Stanley Underwood
- Architectural style: Streamline Moderne
- NRHP reference No.: 79000537
- SFDL No.: 107

Significant dates
- Added to NRHP: November 16, 1979
- Designated SFDL: 1980

In 1941, Anton Refregier won the $26,000 commission for the series History of San Francisco, which are a set of 27 murals painted in the lobby of the Rincon Annex Post Office in San Francisco, California. Refregier painted the mural with casein tempera on white gesso over plaster walls, in the social realism style. Work was interrupted by World War II and restarted in 1946; the murals were completed in 1948.

In 1953, U.S. Representative Hubert B. Scudder opened a Congressional hearing to determine whether the murals should be removed for themes "inconsistent with American ideals and principles"; the often contentious proceedings concluded with their retention. The building is now part of Rincon Center, remodeled as shops and residences after the Post Office left in 1979, and was added to the National Register of Historic Places that year. The Rincon Center lobby is publicly accessible, and regular guided tours of the murals are provided by volunteers.

== History ==
You see, along with at about the same time as the WPA was functioning, as a purely relief program, [Franklin] Roosevelt with the encouragement of George Biddle, whose brother was Attorney General, with encouragement of Eleanor Roosevelt, who was a wonderful woman, very aware of the issues, (a former social worker) a person of great human values; and many other people who are under Roosevelt at that time, including Edward Bruce, suggested that here were all the federal buildings going up new Post Offices, Federal money was being spent. The discovery was made, one day, that there was a procedure of allocating one percent of the total cost of the building for fancy door handles, Renaissance ceilings the kind of ceiling you can see in our 34th Street Post Office in New York City. Why not take that money and give it to artists in national open competitions? This, Joe, was a great idea! It worked like magic.

— Anton Refregier, 1964 interview with Joe Trovato

=== Competition ===
The Section of Painting and Sculpture was created by Treasury Secretary Henry Morgenthau Jr.'s executive order of October 14, 1934 to award commissions to artists for new federal buildings; once the Rincon Annex Post Office was completed in 1940, the Section announced a competition for artists on April 12, 1941, drawing attention in the local press. Entries were required to be submitted by October 1 of that year.

Refregier was selected by a four-person jury: the Annex architect, Gilbert Underwood, and three peer artists, consisting of Victor Arnautoff, Arnold Blanch, and Philip Guston. The jury handed down a split decision, with Underwood, Arnautoff, and Blanch voting for Refregier, and Guston against. His competitors included artists Richard Haines and Wendell C. Jones, whose studies for the project were donated to the Fine Arts Museums of San Francisco in 1988; in total, there were 82 entrants for the Rincon Annex commission, including Refregier. The contract was awarded to Refregier on October 21, 1941.

=== Implementation ===
History of San Francisco was the largest mural commissioned by the federal government at the time of the award in 1941. The medium was specified in the contract to be tempera on gesso, and the murals were to be completed within three years (1,095 calendar days) of the award of the contract. Shortly after he was awarded the contract, in 1942 Refregier told the San Francisco Chronicle he wanted paint the past as it had affected the present conditions of depression, strikes, and war. Painting of the murals began in 1946, and they were completed by fall 1948.

Refregier was required to submit sketches of the planned designs for approval prior to starting work. The project sponsors requested 92 changes during the design and painting of the murals, ranging from slimming a Spanish priest (#6, "Preaching and Farming at Mission Dolores") to raising picket signs so their pro-union messages could not be read (#14, "Torchlight Procession"). An image of Franklin Roosevelt was deleted from the final panel (#27, "War and Peace") because Refregier had based it on a portrait of an aged Roosevelt after the Yalta Conference, which was seen as an "undignified way" to portray him. Refregier was resistant to the removal of Roosevelt, who was to have been in the center of the middle section of the panel, depicting the Four Freedoms: "To omit the portrait of FDR from the final panel dealing with the United Nations meeting in San Francisco, is a concession I cannot make. ... I cannot allow myself to be a victim of propaganda against a very great man."

During the painting of the murals, Refregier would be interrupted by well-meaning Post Office patrons, as he recounted in 1947: "One way I learn [about California history] is from the people who stream through the Post Office and watch me work. They look at my pictures a while, then catch my attention and start telling me exactly what my pictures mean."

=== Responses ===
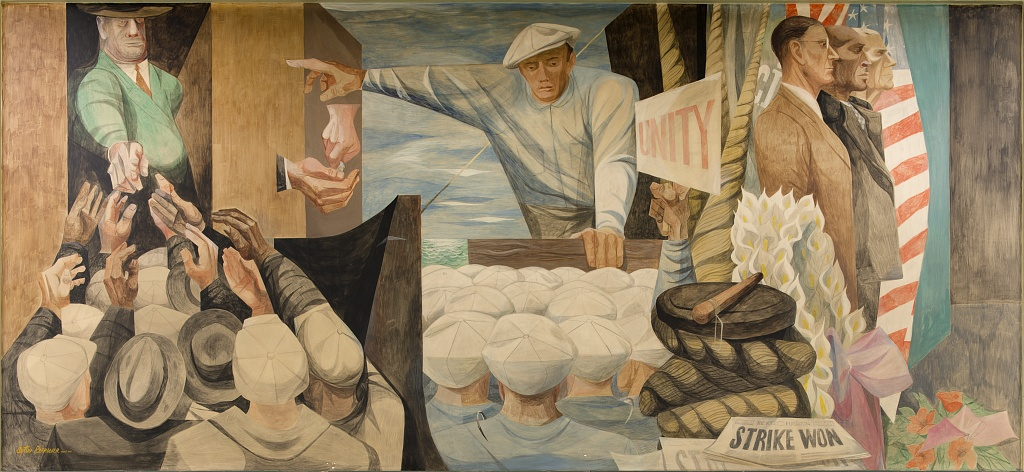
The panel (#24, "The Waterfront"), as modified following protests by the VFW; the three mourners are at the right side, and the anonymous leader (originally intended to be Harry Bridges) is in the center. The mourner in the tan suit has had his hat removed.

The History of San Francisco murals created a heated debate because they depicted controversial events from California's past, painted in a public building using taxpayer funds. People believed that it "placed disproportionate emphasis on violence, racial hatred, and class struggle." Even before Refregier finished, the Veterans of Foreign Wars (VFW) were protesting the murals in spring 1948, specifically the panel depicting the 1934 West Coast waterfront strike (#24, "The Waterfront"), as one of the mourners was pictured with a VFW hat; VFW quartermaster adjutant H.M. "Sam" Herman went on to attack Refregier's politics and questioned the significance of the strike: "Surely there was nothing of historical significance in the waterfront riot to warrant its being commemorated as an outstanding event in the history of our city." Refregier originally had intended to depict Harry Bridges as the union leader, but changed the original design to make the leader anonymous. In response, the Public Building Administration ordered that panel covered, a decision that drew protest from the CIO longshoremen and artists' organizations.

As a compromise, Refregier removed the hat altogether, and the panel was allowed to be shown. In his private notes, Refregier despaired: "The stories in the Hearst press brought out gangs of hoodlums who were constantly under my scaffolding and I no longer worked after the sun set."

That fall, Waldo F. Postel and his colleagues in the Native Sons of the Golden West announced they would begin campaigning for the removal of the murals: "Just what sort of paintings are these? The Communist People's World say they constitute 'a monumental series depicting California history.' We believe they constitute a monumental insult to the city, and in some panels, an outrageous attempt to arouse class hatred." Sculptor Haig Patigian called the murals 'debased' while supporting their removal.

I wish to thank you for your letter as to whether anything can be done about the removal of Communist art in [the Rincon Annex Post Office] ... I realize that some objectionable art, of a subversive nature, has been allowed to go into federal buildings in many parts of the country ... At such a time as we may have a change in the Administration and in the majority of Congress, I believe a committee should make a thorough investigation of this type of art in government buildings with the view to obtaining removal of all that is found to be inconsistent with American ideals and principles.

— Congressman Richard Nixon, Letter to C.E. Plant, July 18, 1949

Republican Congressmen Hubert B. Scudder and Richard Nixon were involved in Congressional attempts to have the work removed. They claimed it had a communistic tone and "defamed pioneers and reflected negatively on California's past." Many believed that "no artist, however distinguished, escaped the heavy, if well meaning, hand of federal supervision."

In a letter to the editor in 1952, the President of the College Art Association noted that "the pro-Chinese sentiments of one section of the murals and indication of the then existing wartime alliance with Russia of another section reflected the realities of the time."

=== 1953 Congressional hearing ===
Congressman Scudder introduced H.J.Res. 211 on March 5, 1953, calling the murals "an insult to the state, an insult to the intelligence of the public, and anti-American", adding "the murals contain subtle ridicule of characters which are supposed to represent the American people."

A hearing on the bill was held on May 1 of that year by the Subcommittee on Public Buildings and Grounds of the United States House Committee on Public Works. Scudder kicked off the meeting by reading a biographical sketch of Refregier into the record, sent from the House Committee on Un-American Activities (HUAC) on April 16, and added that opposition to the murals went back as far as 1941; he had been receiving letters opposed to the murals since his first year in Congress, 1949, sent from organizations like the Native Sons of the Golden West and the American Legion, who claimed the murals "do not truly depict the romance and glory of early California history; but on the contrary cast a most derogatory and improper reflection upon the character of the pioneers, and that other murals are definitely subversive and designed to spread communistic propaganda and tend to promote racial hatred and class warfare".

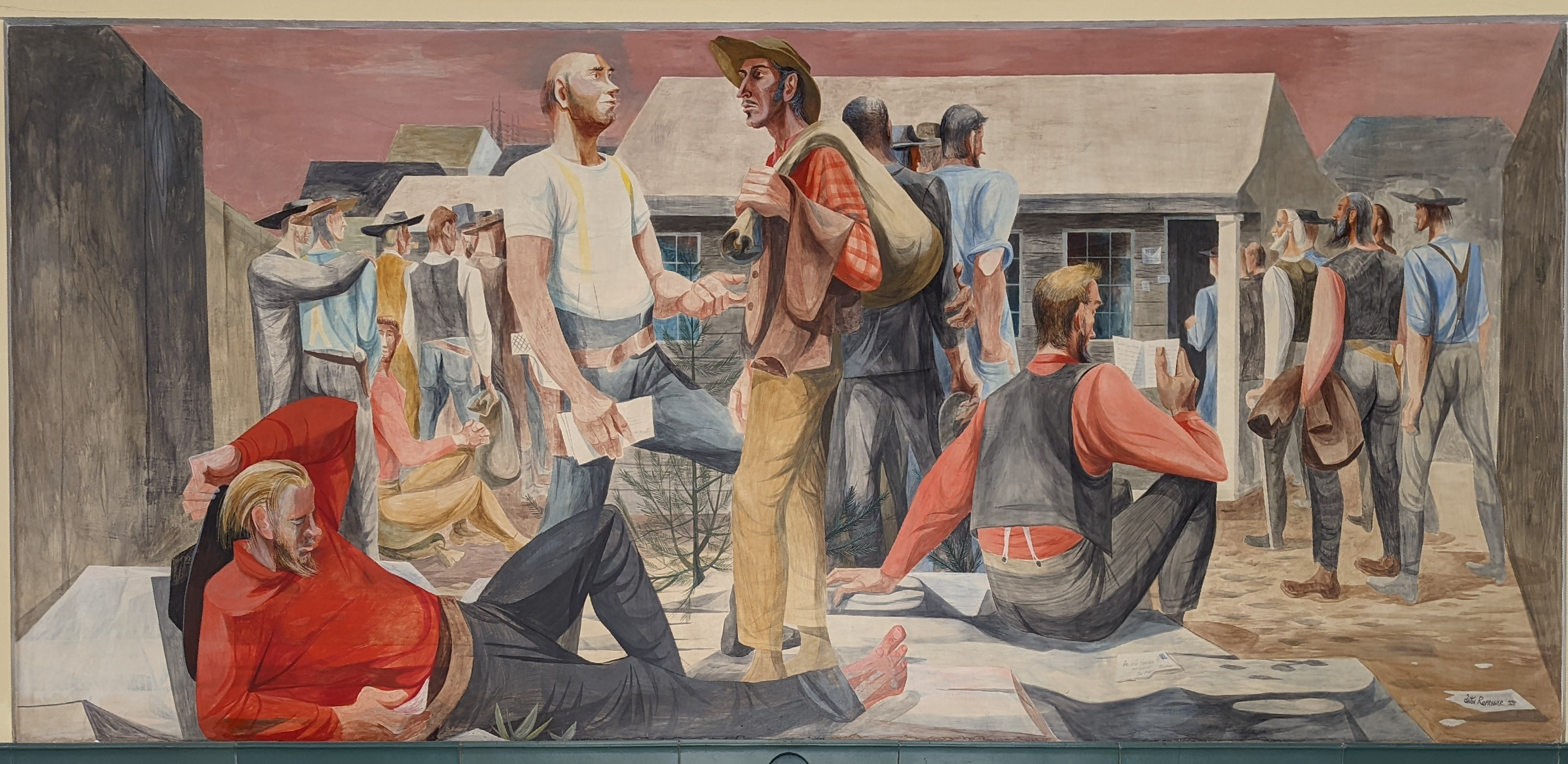
#15 "Pioneers Receiving Mail", derided by Congressman Hubert Scudder in 1953 for showing a "moronic assemblage of people".

Congressman Donald L. Jackson was the next witness to be called. Jackson had replaced Nixon on HUAC after the latter's Senate election, but Jackson claimed he was not officially representing HUAC interests for the subcommittee hearing, despite reading additional details about Refregier's activities both before and after the completion of the murals into the record. Under questioning from Subcommittee Chairman James C. Auchincloss, Jackson admitted he had "seen photographic duplications" but had "not personally seen the murals" before calling them "not truly representative of the history of California", adding "if they were in the Capitol of the United States I would join in protesting them." The HUAC dossiers of Arnautoff and Blanch, the jurors supporting the selection of Refregier, were also read into the record; it was noted that Guston, who had opposed the selection, did not have a HUAC record. Scudder then passed around black-and-white photographs of the murals and provided specific criticism for each one, singling out the depiction of indigenous people ("strong features, muscles, and physique ... [not] a true picture of the aborigines of the West"), Spanish explorers and priests ("big-bellied", "warlike", and "objectionable to people who appreciate ... those who developed California and brought civilization to the west coast"), pioneer settlers ("cadaverous, soulless Americans" and a "moronic assemblage of people"), and gold miners ("depicting the thing which the Communists claim, we are only seeking the golden riches in our mode of life"), among others.

I am much distressed about the Bill introduced by Congressman Scudder to authorize the removal of your murals in the Rincon Annex Post Office. This seems to me a highly injurious proposal. It is injurious because it would mean the destruction of what, to judge from my recollection of your sketches and from reproductions of the finished murals, is a remarkable work of art, and an outstanding example of the growing tendency in your country to try to exert political control over freedom of thought and expression, and to impair the liberty of the creative artist ... The lamentable state of biology and philosophy in the U.S.S.R. shows what happens when creative thought and expression is subjected to control on political or ideological grounds. It is most unfortunate that, just when the free world is protesting against this form of tyranny in the Iron Curtain countries, actions like that of Republican Scudder are trying to introduce a similar tyranny in your great country.

— Julian Huxley, Letter to Anton Refregier, April 18, 1953

In defense of the murals, John F. Shelley and William S. Mailliard, the two congressmen representing San Francisco, questioned the attacks on the historical accuracy of the murals and whether they were truly glorifying subversive themes. Questioning the presence of hammer and sickle imagery in the final panel (#27, "War and Peace") Subcommittee Member J. Harry McGregor had a brief exchange with Mailliard:

McGregor: You do not consider that [the USSR is] an Allied Power now?
Mailliard: When the paintings were done.
McGregor: Times have changed and maybe we should change the paintings.
Mailliard: Probably we should destroy the works of Michelangelo and those of a few other people.

— Subcommittee meeting, May 1, 1953

Later in the defense, a statement from Warren Howell was read into the record, providing "recognizable sources which are authoritative and authentic" for many of the scenes depicted in the murals. The murals were also vigorously defended by a group of artists and museum directors, including the directors of three prominent San Francisco art museums wrote statements supporting the artistic merit of the murals: Walter Heil (Director of the de Young Museum), Thomas Carr Howe Jr. (California Palace of the Legion of Honor), and Grace McCann Morley (San Francisco Museum of Art). Howe added that due to the delicate egg tempera technique used, the murals could not be removed without great care and expense. A list of more than 300 citizens and organizations opposing the removal included support from the Museum of Modern Art (New York), American Federation of Arts, and Artists' Equity. Mailliard said the selection of Refregier was "unfortunate", but added "Many of these arguments for and against removal of the murals seem to me to be without validity. ... Judging either the painter or the style of art used would be putting the Congress in the same position as the totalitarian governments who refuse to allow music to be played if the composer's politics do not suit them."

Scudder's bill never made it out of committee, despite a vote of support from the California State Senate. A local newspaper, the Sausalito News, chided Scudder to "leave the S.F. Postoffice Murals alone and come back into your own bailiwick". While running for re-election in 1954, Scudder's opponent Max Kortum noted that Scudder was best known for failing to remove the murals, calling him a misguided patriot and comparing him to "a child who marches in a parade holding up the American flag". Scudder won re-election and continued to insist the murals were "very obnoxious to people in the area", claiming that an analysis showed parts of them were "definitely Communist propaganda" in 1957.

=== Preservation and restoration ===
All of the mail collected in San Francisco was taken to Rincon Annex for distribution. After the Post Office moved the mail distribution facilities to India Basin, vacating the space in 1979, preservationists including Emmy Lou Packard rallied again to save the murals; the building was added to the National Register of Historic Places that year. San Francisco named added the building to its Designated Landmarks (#107) in 1980. A proposed conversion to what would become the Rincon Center shopping, dining, and residential complex was unveiled in 1983; under the proposal, the building's exterior and interior would be preserved intact while adding two floors and two towers.

During the conversion, Thomas Portué restored the murals in 1987. Portué again restored the murals in 2014, alongside his daughter Nicole, and is the ongoing custodian of the murals.

== Design ==
Diagram of mural locations

The mural consists of 27 panels, totaling 400 feet (120 m) long by 6 feet 9 inches (2.06 m) high, completely covering the frieze of the L-shaped lobby. The lobby consists of two hallways set at right angles to each other; the longer hallway, 208-foot (63 m) long, is parallel to Mission Street, and the shorter hallway is parallel to Spear. The ceiling height is 25 feet (7.6 m). The commission of US$26,000 (equivalent to $569,000 in 2025) was based on the standard rate of ten dollars per square foot.

=== Subjects ===
The mural panels depicted various historical events from California's past, and was meant to span all of human history, from an early Native American creating art (#1, planned title: "In the Beginning, Waters Covered All Earth Except Mount Diabalo [sic]") to the Golden Gate International Exposition (#26, planned title: "Chinatown—The Fair, 1946"). In between, other panels would include the California Gold Rush, the 1877 anti-Chinese Sand Lot riots, the 1860s building by Union Pacific of the western First transcontinental railroad, the disastrous 1906 San Francisco earthquake and fire, the trial of trade unionist Tom Mooney for the Preparedness Day Bombing, the 1934 San Francisco Waterfront Strike, the city's Second World War contributions, culminating in the 1945 signing of the United Nations Charter in the San Francisco War Memorial Opera House.

Refregier used these topics, including the tragedies, as inspiration. Refregier "believed that art must address itself to contemporary issues and that a mural painting in particular must not be 'banal, decorative embellishment', but a 'meaningful, significant, powerful plastic statement based on the history and lives of the people'". As Brian N. Wallis noted in a 1977 catalog of Refregier's work, "Refregier had recourse to two interpretations of California history, these being the glorious, romantic vision of folk tales, or the realistic depiction of the hardships and struggles of the early settlers. Refregier selected the realistic representation as being more interesting and more dramatic. This deviation from the accepted, or preferred, view of history was the source of much of the dispute over the murals". Some suspected Refregier of being a communist because of his Russian–USSR background, and his mural topics about social issues.

Titles and subjects of the History of San Francisco murals
Panel No. (Note: Numbered consecutively from left to right, starting from the panel to the right of the corner between the northeast and southeast walls of the Mission Street lobby.)	Image (Note: Images for Panels #4–10;12–17;18–22;24;25;27: Photographed by Carol M. Highsmith in 2012.)	Title			Planned Width (Note: Height of each mural was 6 ft 9 in (2.06 m).)	Planned Location	Subjects / Events / Context
Panel No.	Image	Planned	NRIS	Alternate	Planned Width	Planned Location	Subjects / Events / Context
1		"In the Beginning, Waters Covered All Earth Except Mount Diabalo [sic]"	"A California Indian Creates"		7 ft 2.1 m	Mission Street Lobby, southeast wall	Indigenous peoples of California; Miwok; Ohlone
2		"To the Costanoas There Was No Land Beyond the Bay"	"Indians by the Golden Gate"		16 ft 4 in 4.98 m	Mission Street Lobby, southeast wall	Indigenous peoples of California; Miwok; Ohlone; Golden Gate
3		"1579—Drake"	"Sir Francis Drake"		7 ft 2.1 m	Mission Street Lobby, southeast wall	Sir Francis Drake; Age of Discovery
4		"Spain Claims the Bay"	"Conquistadores Discover the Pacific"		16 ft 4 in 4.98 m	Mission Street Lobby, southeast wall	Juan Rodríguez Cabrillo; Age of Discovery; San Francisco Bay Discovery Site; Portolá expedition
5		"1776—Building the Mission Dolores"	"Monks Building the Missions"		7 ft 2.1 m	Mission Street Lobby, southeast wall	Spanish missions in California; Spanish colonization of the Americas
6		"Mission"	"Preaching and Farming at Mission Dolores"		16 ft 4 in 4.98 m	Mission Street Lobby, southeast wall	Spanish missions in California; Mission Indians; California mission clash of cultures; Mission San Francisco de Asís
7		"'Fort Ross'—Russian Trading Post"	"Fort Ross–Russian Trade Post"		7 ft 2.1 m	Mission Street Lobby, southeast wall	Fort Ross State Historic Park; Fort Ross, California
8		"Overland Trek Westward"	"Hardships of the Emigrant Trail"		16 ft 4 in 4.98 m	Mission Street Lobby, southeast wall	Oregon Trail; Hastings Cutoff; Donner Party; California Trail
9		"1847—Printing California Star"	"An Early Newspaper Office"		7 ft 2.1 m	Mission Street Lobby, southeast wall	California Star
10		"1846—California Becomes an Independent Republic"	"Raising the Bear Flag"		16 ft 4 in 4.98 m	Mission Street Lobby, southeast wall	California Republic; Bear Flag Monument; Flag of California; Mexican–American War; Mexican Cession
11		"Gold Discovered at Sutter's Mill"	"Finding Gold at Sutter's Mill"		7 ft 2.1 m	Mission Street Lobby, southeast wall	California Gold Rush; Sutter's Mill
12		"Gold Rush"	"Miners Panning Gold"		16 ft 4 in 4.98 m	Mission Street Lobby, southeast wall	California Gold Rush; Gold panning
13		"Migration"	"Arrival by Ship"		7 ft 2.1 m	Mission Street Lobby, southeast wall	Sailing to California; Manifest destiny
14		"Importation of Chinese Labor" (Note: Themes incorporated into Panel #16, "Building the Railroad".)	"Torchlight Parade"	"Torchlight Procession"	5 ft 5 in 1.65 m	Spear Street Lobby, northeast wall	Eight-hour day; A. M. Winn
15		"Waiting for Mail"	"Pioneers Receiving Mail"		15 ft 6 in 4.72 m	Spear Street Lobby, northeast wall	Pacific Mail Steamship Company; United States Postal Service
16		"Clearing the Ground"	"Building the Railroad" (Note: Panel #16, "Building the Railroad" is on the southeast wall of the Spear Street lobby. The narrow width originally allotted to #16 was used in "Building the Railroad", which wraps around to the adjacent northeast and southwest walls.)		3 ft 1 in 0.94 m	Spear Street Lobby, northeast wall	First transcontinental railroad; Central Pacific Railroad; Tracklaying race of 1869
17		"Building the Union Pacific" (Note: The planned position for this panel was moved up to Panel #16.)	"Vigilante Days" (Note: Panel #17 "Vigilante Days" is on the southwest wall of the Spear Street lobby.)		20 ft 6 in 6.25 m	Spear Street Lobby, southeast wall	James King of William; James P. Casey
18		"Surveyor"	"Civil War Issues"	"Riot Scene, Civil War Days"	8 ft 2.4 m	Spear Street Lobby, southwest wall	William M. Gwin; David C. Broderick; Broderick–Terry duel
19		"1870—Embarcadero"	"The Sand Lot Riots of 1870"	"Beating the Chinese" (Note: Panel #19, "Beating the Chinese" is on the northwest wall of the Mission Street lobby, occupying the narrower space originally intended for #21.)	17 ft 4 in 5.28 m	Spear Street Lobby, southwest wall	San Francisco riot of 1877; Anti-Chinese violence in California
20		"Expansion of the City"	"San Francisco as a Cultural Center" (Note: Panel #20, "San Francisco as a Cultural Center" is on the northwest wall of the Mission Street Lobby, occupying the wider space originally intended for #22.)		7 ft 2 in 2.18 m	Spear Street Lobby, southwest wall	L–R: (Lotta Crabtree; Frank Norris; Luther Burbank; Robert Louis Stevenson; Mark Twain; Bret Harte; Hubert Howe Bancroft; Jack London); Mazeppa; Adah Isaacs Menken
21		"Cable Car"	"Earthquake and Fire of 1906" (Note: Panel #21, "Earthquake and Fire of 1906" occupies part of the very wide space originally intended for #23.)		7 ft 6 in 2.29 m	Mission Street Lobby, northwest wall	1906 San Francisco earthquake
22		"Luther Burbank" (Note: Burbank is now depicted in Panel #20, "San Francisco as a Cultural Center")	"Reconstruction After the Fire" (Note: Panel #22, "Reconstruction After the Fire" occupies part of the very wide space originally intended for #23.)		18 ft 6 in 5.64 m	Mission Street Lobby, northwest wall	1906 San Francisco earthquake; Committee of Fifty (1906); Amadeo Giannini
23		"1906—The Great Earthquake and Fire" (Note: Themes and the space from the original design were reused in #21 and #22.)	"The Mooney Case"		46 ft 14 m	Mission Street Lobby, northwest wall	Preparedness Day Bombing; Thomas Mooney; Warren K. Billings
24		"1916—Preparedness Day" (Note: Themes for this were moved up to Panel #23.)	"The Waterfront–1934"		16 ft 4.9 m	Mission Street Lobby, northwest wall	1934 West Coast waterfront strike
25		"Maritime and General Strike" (Note: Themes for this were moved up to Panel #24.)	"Building the Golden Gate Bridge"		16 ft 4.9 m	Mission Street Lobby, northwest wall	Golden Gate; Golden Gate Bridge
26		"Chinatown—The Fair, 1946" (Note: Originally intended to depict the 1939–40 Golden Gate International Exposition on Treasure Island as the final panel; the panel (but not the theme) was moved to #27.)	"Shipyards during the War"		48 ft 5 in 14.76 m	Mission Street Lobby, northwest wall	Liberty ship; Hunters Point Naval Shipyard
27		"1933—Building Golden Gate Bridge" (Note: Original themes were moved up to Panel #25.)	"War and Peace"		20 ft 7 in 6.27 m	Mission Street Lobby, northeast wall	World War II; Four Freedoms

=== Style ===
The style of this historic mural had many of Refregier's key characteristics. The palette was composed of yellows, browns, and grays, punctuated by red in certain areas to evoke emotion. Earthy tones and the lack of bright colors remind viewers of the struggles and hardships he is depicting. Refregier also uses white to represent virtue in those inspired by a cause. His style is very flat and one-dimensional. He uses solid blocks of color to denote shadows, along with depth and shade. His painting style appears to be very rudimentary and simple, but complex because of the way he uses color to evoke emotion and powerful images to tell a story.

=== In other media ===
- The cover art for In the Interest of Others: Organizations and Social Activism (by John Ahlquist and Margaret Levi, 2013) is derived from Panel #24 ("The Waterfront"), via a simplified silkscreen print prepared c.1949, itself notable as the most widely reproduced print of the mural set.

== See also ==
- Life of Washington (1936) — Mural by Victor Arnautoff which San Francisco School Board attempted to destroy in 2019
- Man at the Crossroads (1934) — Mural by Diego Rivera destroyed over its communist themes
