= Yank Sing =

Chinese restaurant in San Francisco

Restaurant information
- Location: California, United States

Yank Sing is a dim sum restaurant with locations in the Rincon Center (opened in 1999, slated to close September 2026) and on Stevenson Street in San Francisco's Financial District.

The restaurant takes its name from an old moniker used for Guangzhou, a major city in China's southern Guangdong province: yank sing is the Cantonese romanization of 羊城, or "City of Goats."

The original location was opened by George Chan at 1357 Powell Street in San Francisco's Chinatown in 1958. The second location was opened at 671 Broadway Street at Powell Street, also in Chinatown, in 1966 by George and his wife, Alice Chan. The third Yank Sing location was (and still is) at 49 Stevenson Street and Second Street, in the Financial District. A fourth opened at 427 Battery Street, not far from Chinatown. When Alice got sick and needed help with the restaurant, her son Henry dropped out of medical school weeks shy of completion. Vera Chan-Waller, Henry's daughter, and her husband Nathan Waller are the current owners.

Chef and restaurateur Cecilia Chiang is said to have lunched at the Chinatown location every day, and Dianne Feinstein was a frequent customer at their Battery Street location. Woody Allen filmed part of his 1972 movie Play It Again, Sam at the Broadway location. The James Beard Foundation named Yank Sing an American Classic in 2009. The restaurant was featured on Season 1, Episode 2 of The Best Thing I Ever Ate.

== Labor problems ==
In the summer of 2013, 280 employees followed the advice of the Chinese Progressive Assn. and filed labor violation complaints looking for better working conditions and wages with the help of the Asian Law Caucus. Henry Chan and his wife Judy did not fight the charges.

The Chans gave the employees raises and paid vacations and health benefits. They also gave more than 280 former and current employees $4 million in back wages.
