= Rincon Center =

- Rincon Annex
- U.S. National Register of Historic Places
- San Francisco Designated Landmark
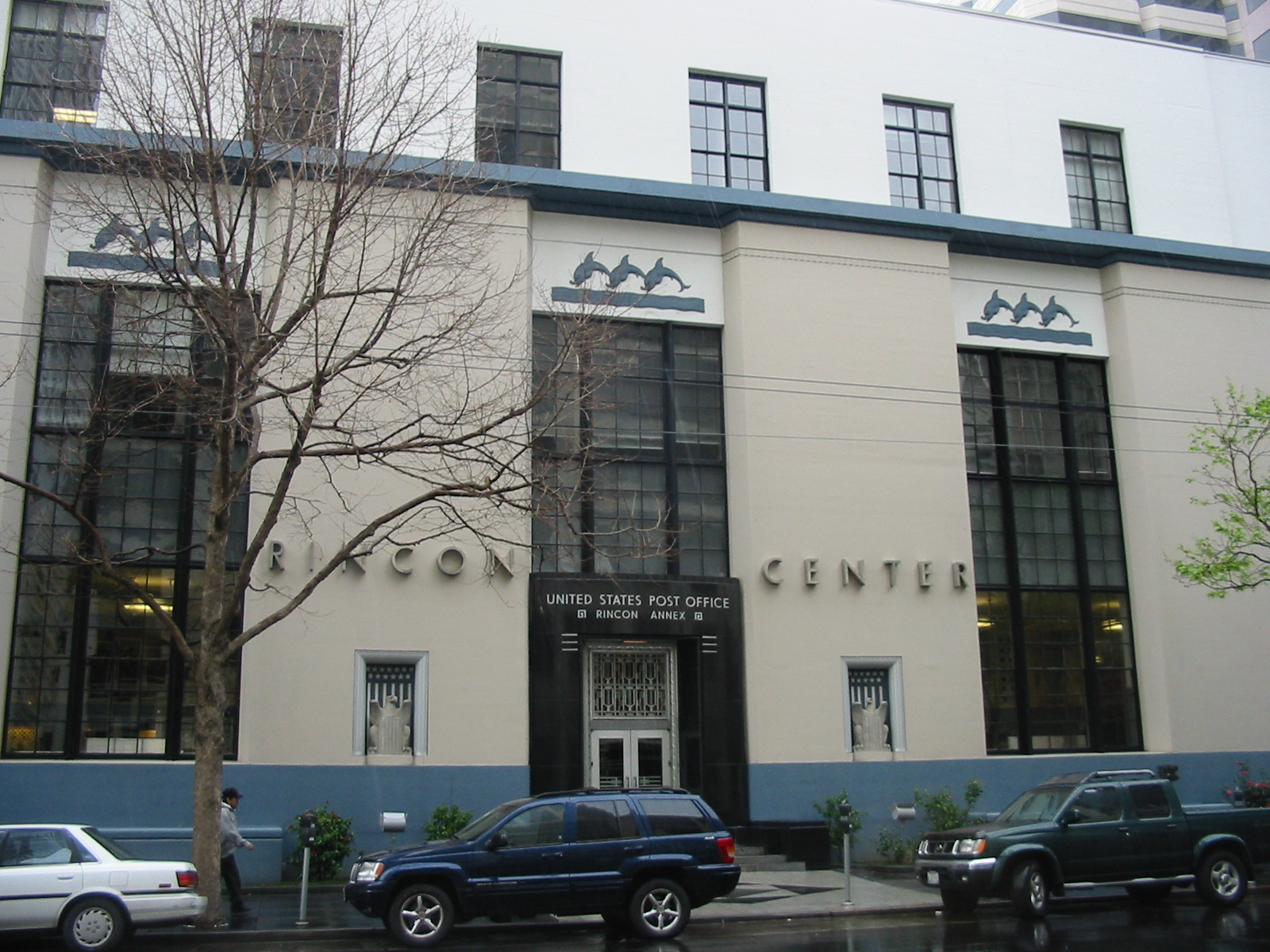
- Rincon Center in May 2006

- Location within San Francisco County Location within California Location within the United States
- Location: 101--199 Mission St., San Francisco, California
- Coordinates: 37°47′32″N 122°23′34″W
- Area: 1.9 acres (0.77 ha)
- Built: 1940
- Built by: George A. Fuller Construction Co.
- Architect: Gilbert Stanley Underwood
- Architectural style: Streamline Moderne
- NRHP reference No.: 79000537
- SFDL No.: 107

Significant dates
- Added to NRHP: November 16, 1979
- Designated SFDL: 1980

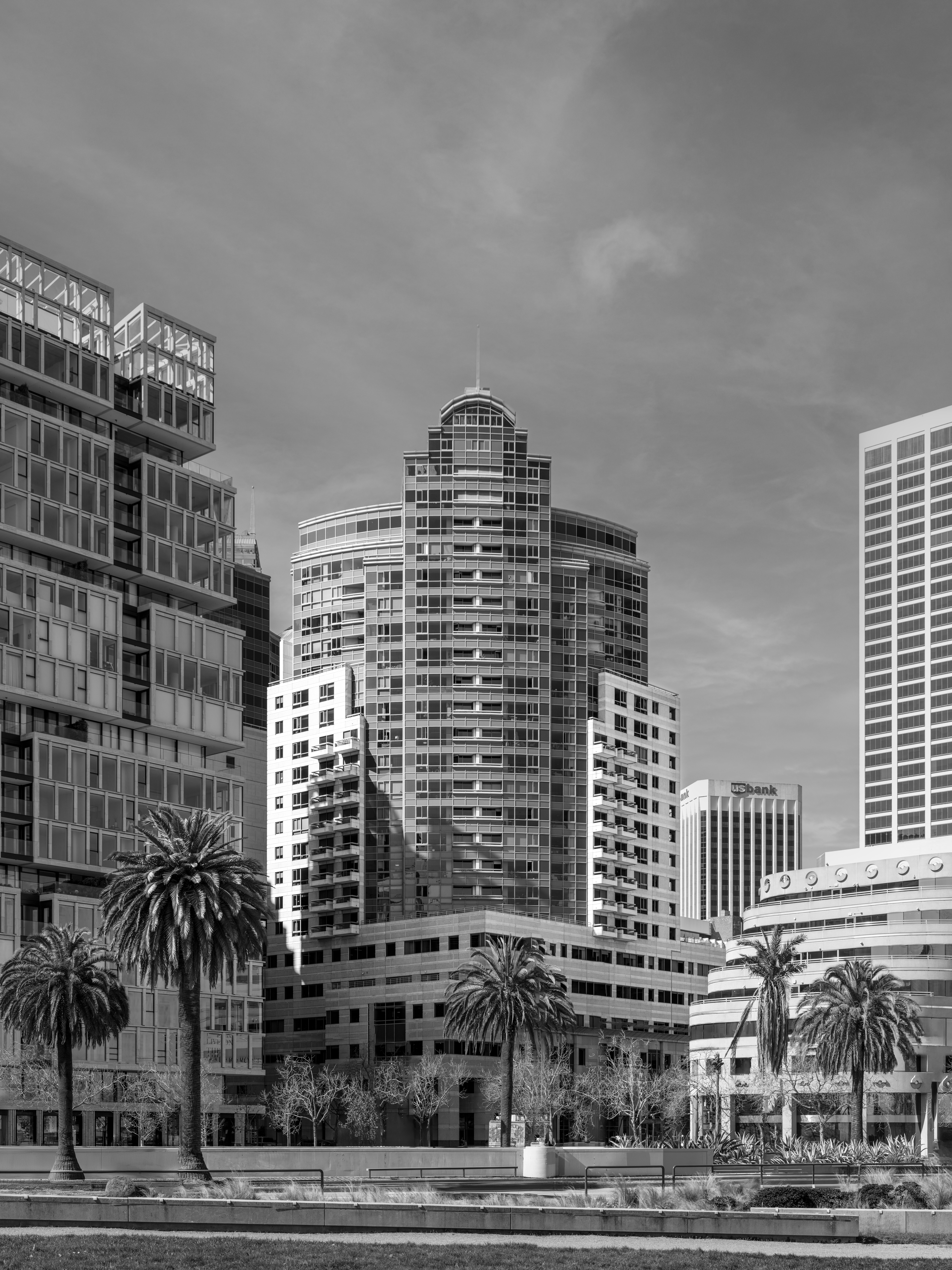
Rincon Towers

Rincon Center is a complex of shops, restaurants, offices, and apartments in the South of Market neighborhood of Downtown San Francisco, California. It includes two buildings, one of which is the former Rincon Annex post office building, completed in 1940. Rincon Center occupies an entire city block near the Embarcadero, bounded by Mission, Howard, Spear, and Steuart Streets.

== Rincon Annex ==
Southern Pacific (SP) originally purchased the land where the original Rincon Annex was completed, next to its headquarters for the extension of its rail line to downtown San Francisco, but the western terminus of the San Francisco–Oakland Bay Bridge interfered with the proposed site and the increasing usage of the automobile also reduced demand for SP's Peninsula Commute service. The original Rincon Annex was designed by Gilbert Stanley Underwood in the Streamline Moderne style. Groundbreaking on the site occurred on June 1, 1939, the building was completed by October 15, 1940, and the facility opened on October 26. The exterior is decorated with stone relief friezes of dolphins above the doorways and windows.

The original Rincon Annex building has a footprint of 330 by 266 feet (101 by 81 m), with three floors and a half basement. The first floor interior has ceilings that are 25 feet (7.6 m) high; the large L-shaped lobby is 208 feet (63 m) long (for the portion parallel to Mission) and 34 feet (10 m) long (parallel to Spear). The third floor was used for employee lounge areas, dressing rooms, and offices. At its peak, there were 1,000 to 1,500 Postal Service employees working simultaneously in the building; air conditioning was installed in 1958 to reduce interior temperatures.

The first expansion of Rincon Annex occurred between 1959 and 1960 on the southeast side of the block to handle mail intake and distribution; automated mail sorting machinery was installed in 1963, 1966, and 1966–78. The United States Postal Service (USPS) was spun off as a government corporation in 1972 and because it was less efficient to sort mail in a multilevel facility, the USPS began negotiations to move the mail sorting facility from Rincon Annex to India Basin Park in 1976; the move was completed by 1979. The Rincon Annex building was listed on the National Register of Historic Places the same year.

=== Murals ===
The interior of the lobby (parallel to the Mission and Spear street facades) features the History of San Francisco mural series, comprising 27 tempera-on-gesso murals painted by the Russian immigrant artist Anton Refregier from 1941 to 1948 under the Section of Painting and Sculpture of the United States Department of the Treasury. The murals, in the social realism style, depict the history of California and San Francisco's role in it. As they were completed immediately following World War II, they generated fierce controversies. Refregier's detractors criticized his artistic style and questioned his political leanings. The controversy eventually reached the U.S. Congress, where critics called for the murals to be destroyed. The murals led to the preservation of the post office lobby as part of the Rincon Center development.

== 1980s expansion ==
In 1978, the United States Postal Service announced it would move the mail sorting facilities from Rincon Annex to a larger building at India Basin, and the Rincon Annex Post Office was shut down by 1979. The San Francisco Board of Supervisors subsequently adopted the Rincon Point – South Beach Project Area Redevelopment Plan on January 5, 1981, which provided controls for land use, development standards, and urban design guidelines for the area including Rincon Annex. Specific Rincon Annex controls were adopted on October 18, 1983, and the USPS entered a 65-year lease with Rincon Center Associates, a partnership headed by Perini Land & Development Company, to develop the former Rincon Annex.

The original building and site was developed into a mixed-use center by Rincon Center Associates; the design was approved on August 20, 1985. The lead designer was Scott Johnson of Pereira Associates, the firm founded by William Pereira, designer of the Transamerica Pyramid. The complex was completed in 1988.

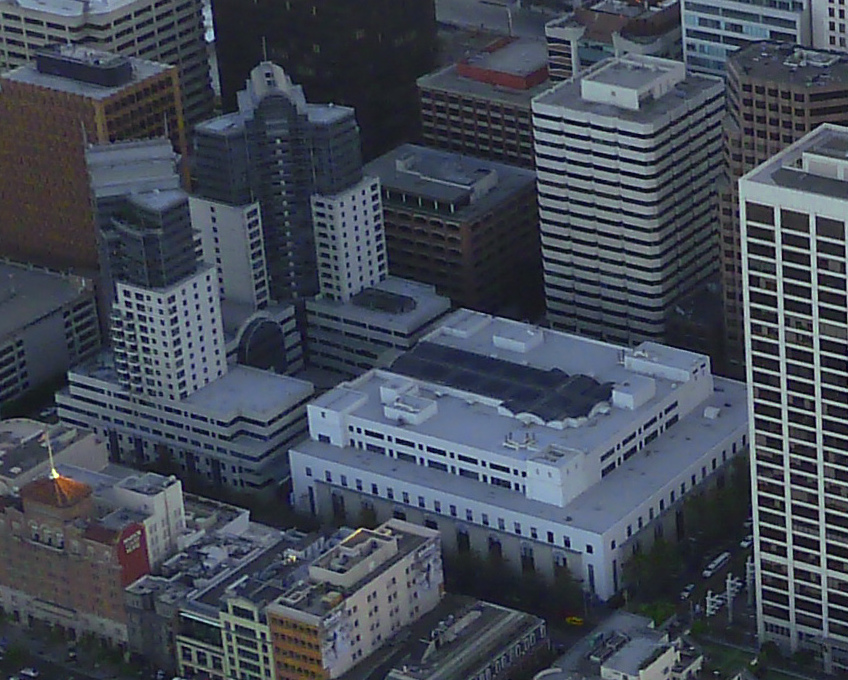
Aerial view of Rincon Center (2010)

Two new stories of offices were added to top of the original Rincon Annex building, which was also opened up to create a five-story atrium in the rear courtyard, topped by a 200-foot (61 m) long skylight with a food court on the lower level. A new mixed-use building on the southeast side of the block contains a new post office, offices, and 320 apartments in twin 23-story towers rising from the commercial levels. The base or commercial podium of the new building is six stories tall. The residences were completed in 1989, originally intended as condominiums. After the completion of Rincon Center, the parcel was divided into four lots: the original Rincon Annex, the commercial "podium" of the new building, the new postal facility, and the residential towers of the new building.

The USPS transferred its ownership of three of the four lots to BRE/Rincon Land LLC in 1999, retaining ownership of the new postal facility only. The buildings were subsequently sold to Beacon Capital Partners in July 2006 for $275 million, and the apartments were sold to Capital Properties in June 2007 for $143 million. Beacon had been planning to convert the apartments to condominiums prior to the sale. Capital Properties took a two-year, $110 million loan from Bear Stearns to fund its purchase; in the wake of that bank's collapse during the Great Recession, the debt was acquired by Carmel Partners, which foreclosed on Capital Properties and took over the residences. In 2010, Capital Properties filed an unsuccessful lawsuit to have the property returned. Beacon Capital sold its remaining interest in Rincon Center to Hudson Pacific in April 2011.

Until the COVID-19 pandemic, San Francisco City Guides led walking tours of the Rincon Annex murals. Because of the pandemic, retail space in the atrium became significantly less viable, and the historic nature of the original Rincon Annex lobby meant the atrium could not be opened to the street to facilitate customer traffic. San Francisco approved an amendment to the redevelopment plan to allow the ground floor retail space to be used as offices in December 2020.

=== Tenants ===
Corporate tenants in Rincon Center have included AIG and Salesforce, which moved in 2018 to Salesforce Tower, replaced by Twilio.

=== Restaurants ===
Notable restaurants in Rincon Center include Etrusca (1990–93, operated by the Il Fornaio restaurant group) and Yank Sing (1999–present).

=== Artwork ===
The Rain Cloud installation art work in the atrium was designed by the contemporary artist Doug Hollis and consisted of a continuous 85-foot (26 m) column of water drops falling from an eight-foot by eight-foot acrylic glass box at ceiling level perforated with 4,000 holes. It was removed in an early 2020s renovation that also removed an Art Deco-inspired frieze by Richard Haas on recent California history from the atrium and installed vegetated panels.

== Gallery ==
=== Rincon Annex Post Office ===
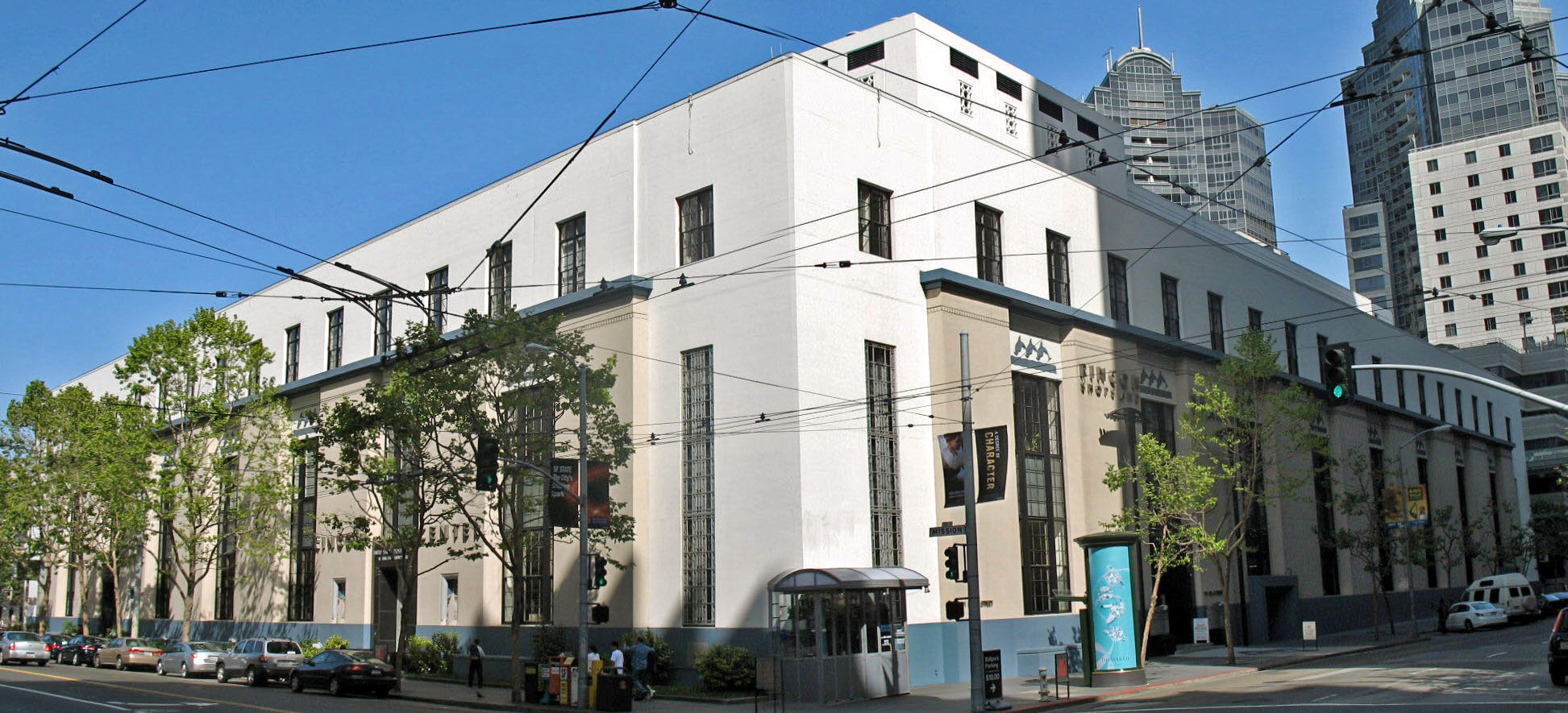
Exterior of Rincon Annex, 2008, view east from intersection of Mission and Spear

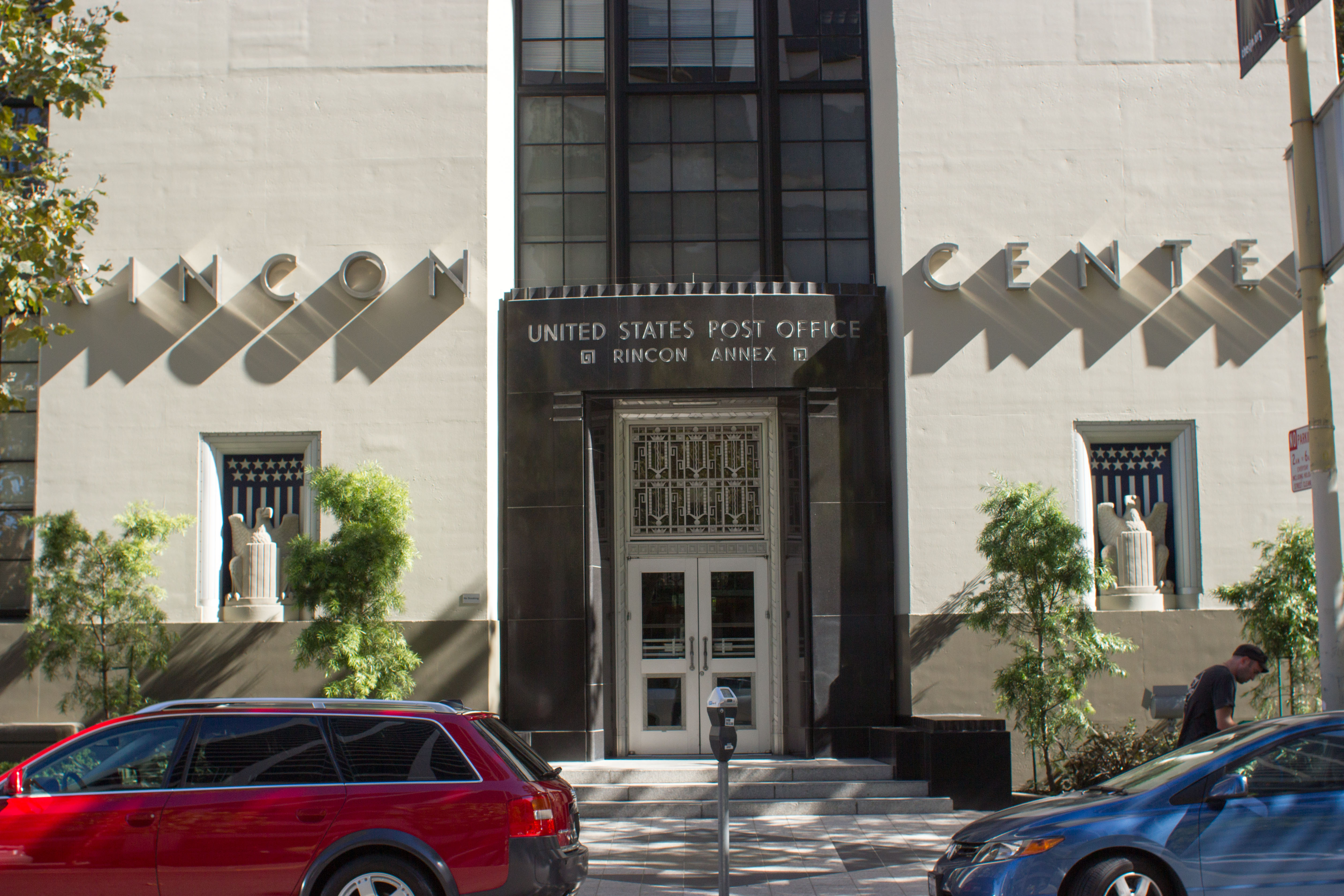
Rincon Center entrance, Mission Street facade

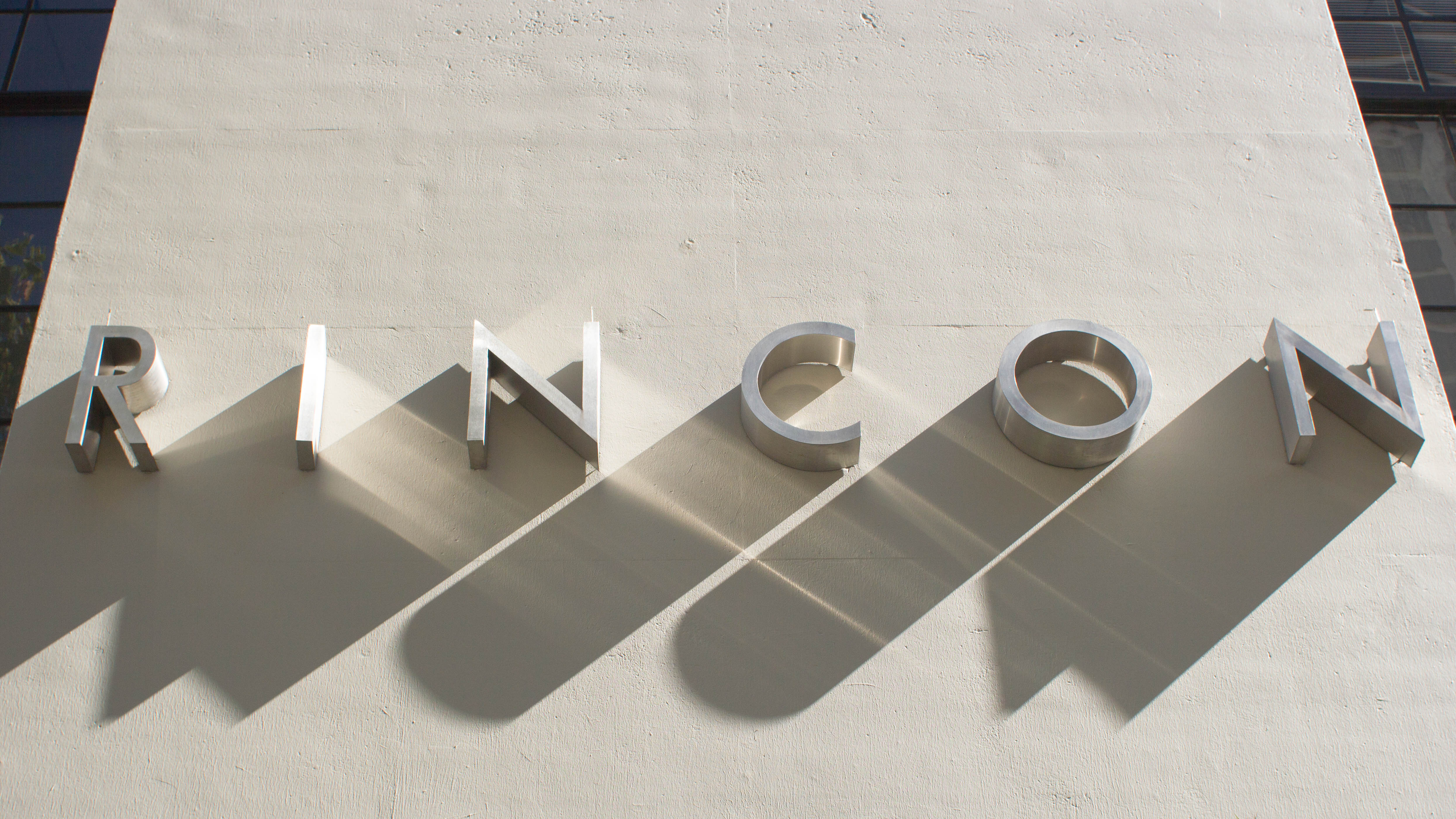
Detail of sign

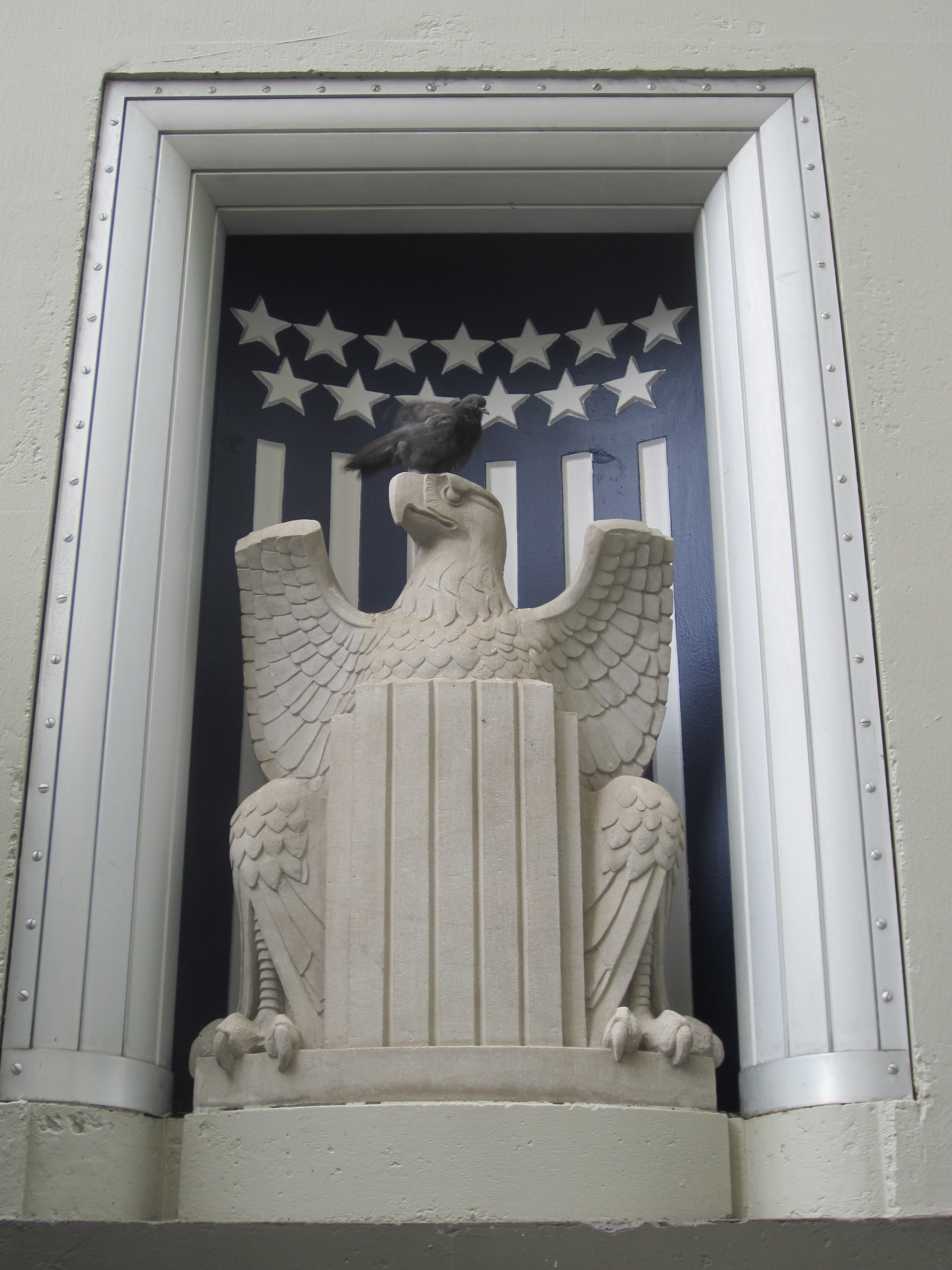
Eagle statue flanking main entrance

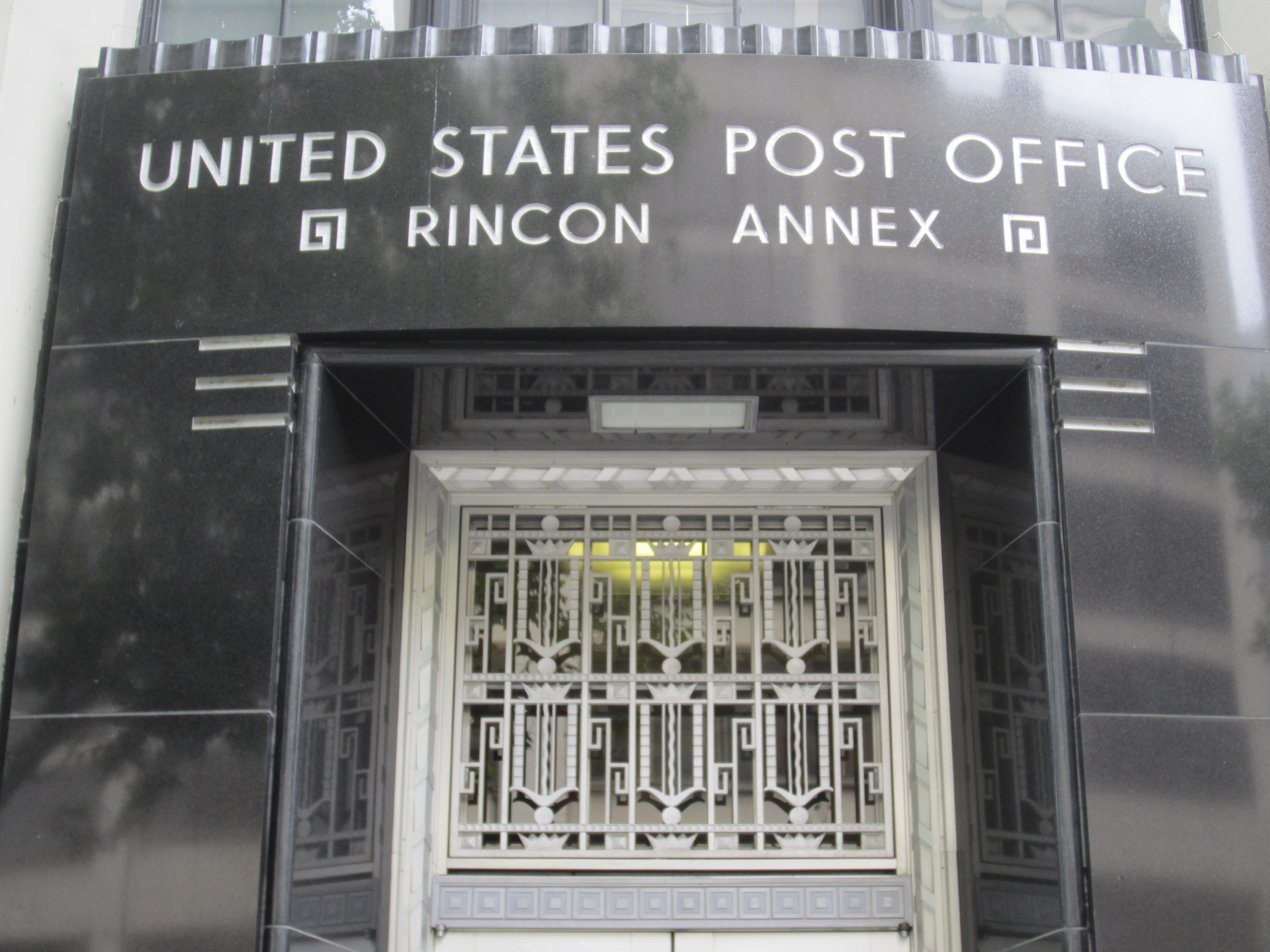
Main entrance details

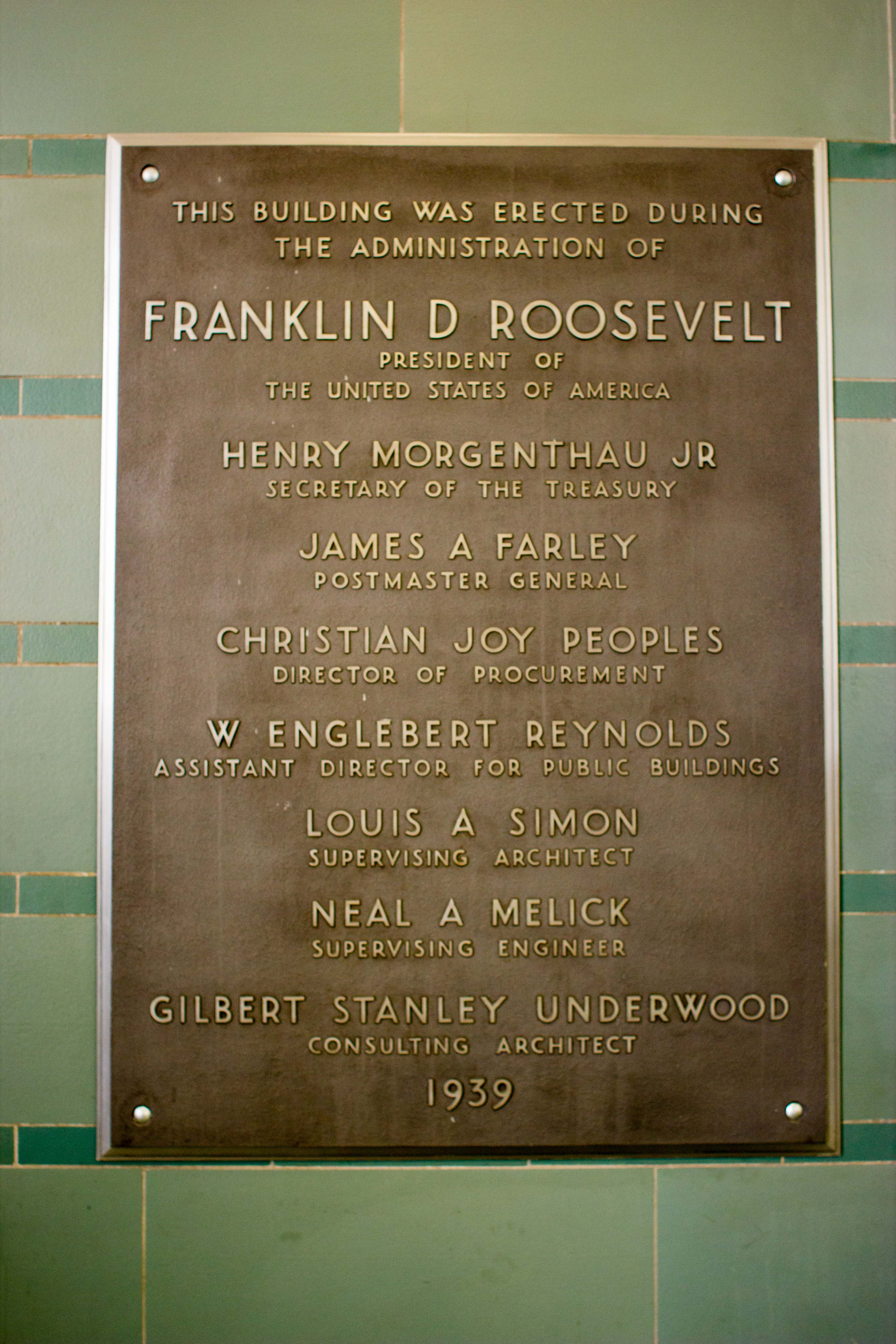
1939 post office dedication plaque

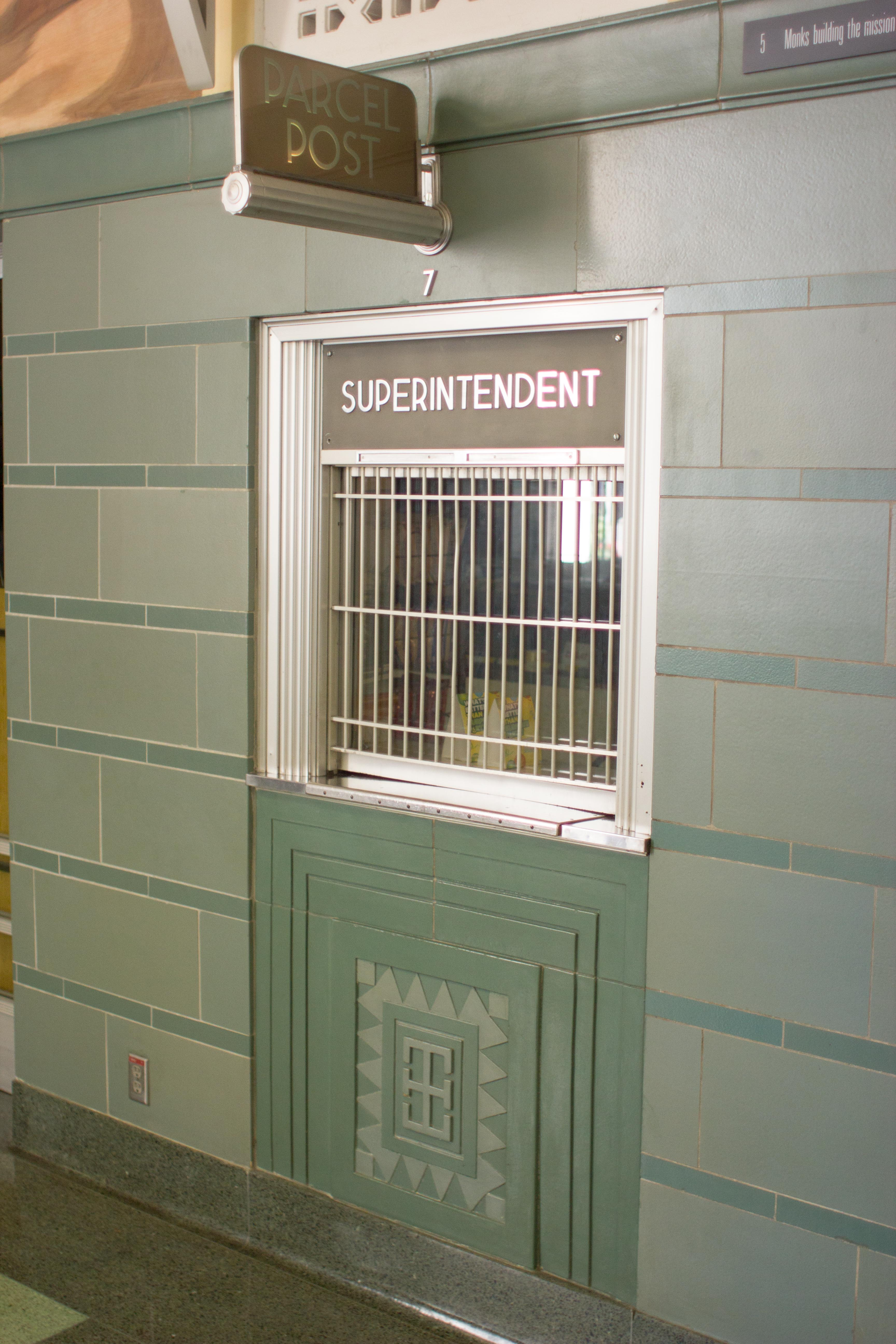
Former parcel post window

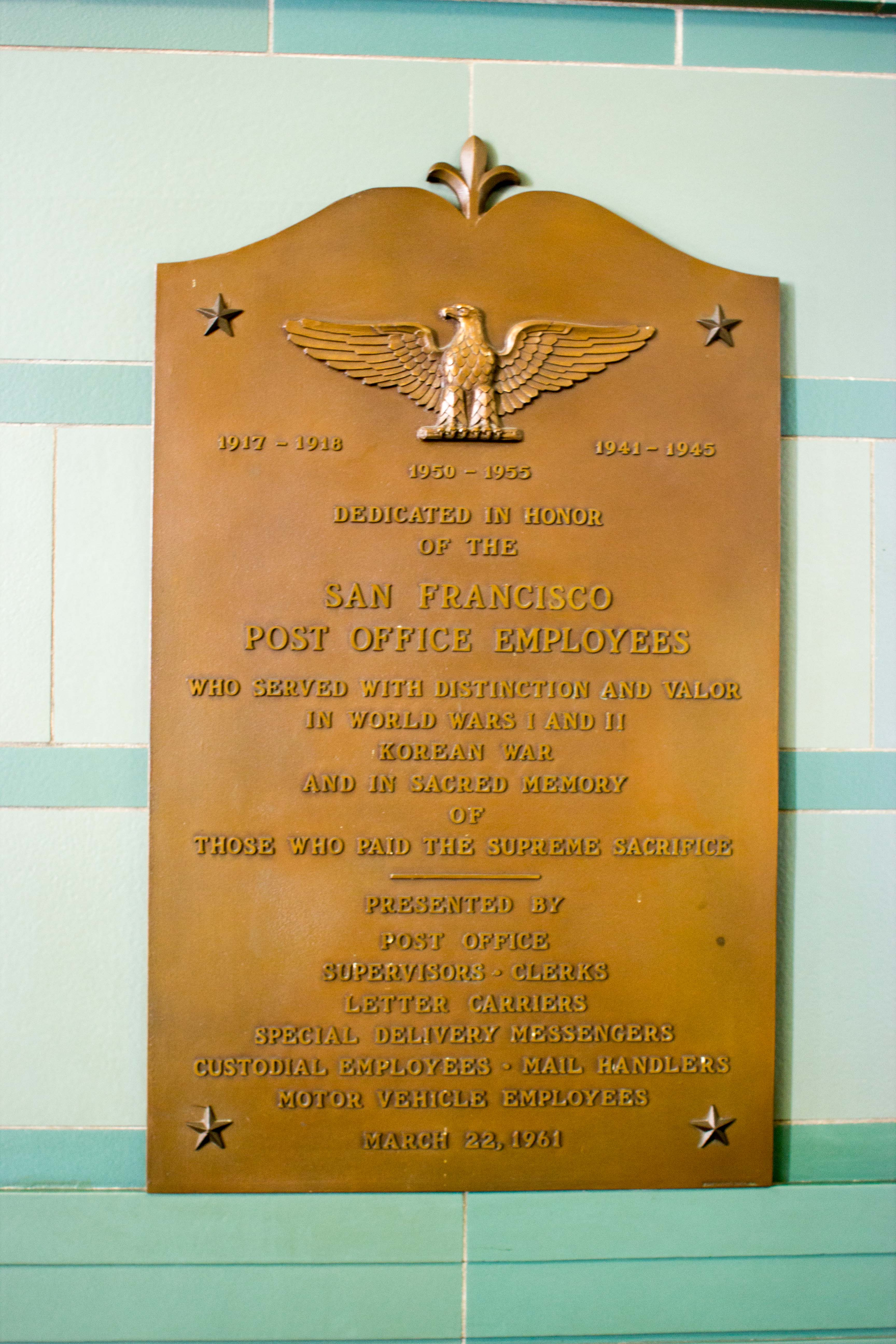
1961 Post Office war memorial plaque

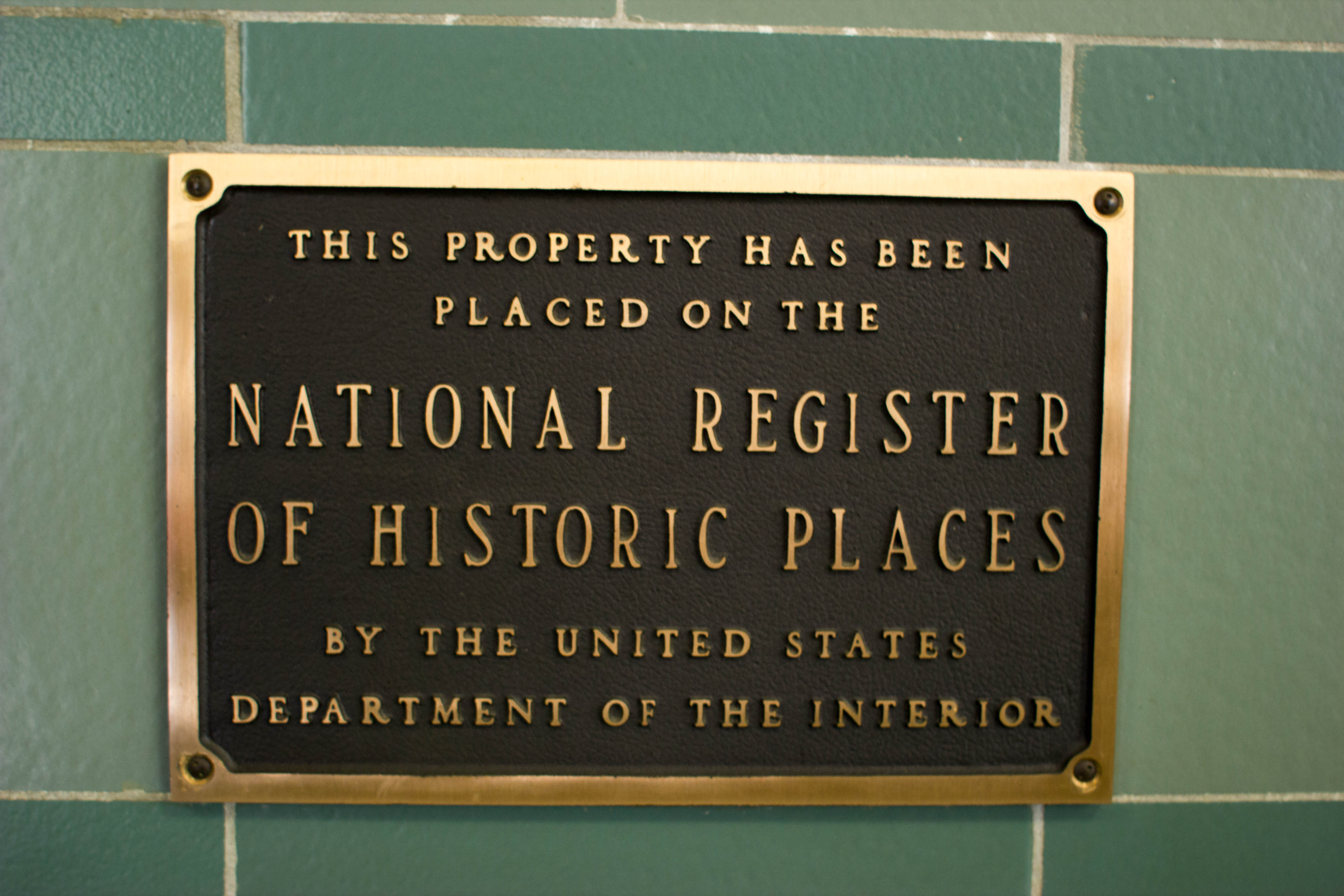
Rincon Annex historic marker

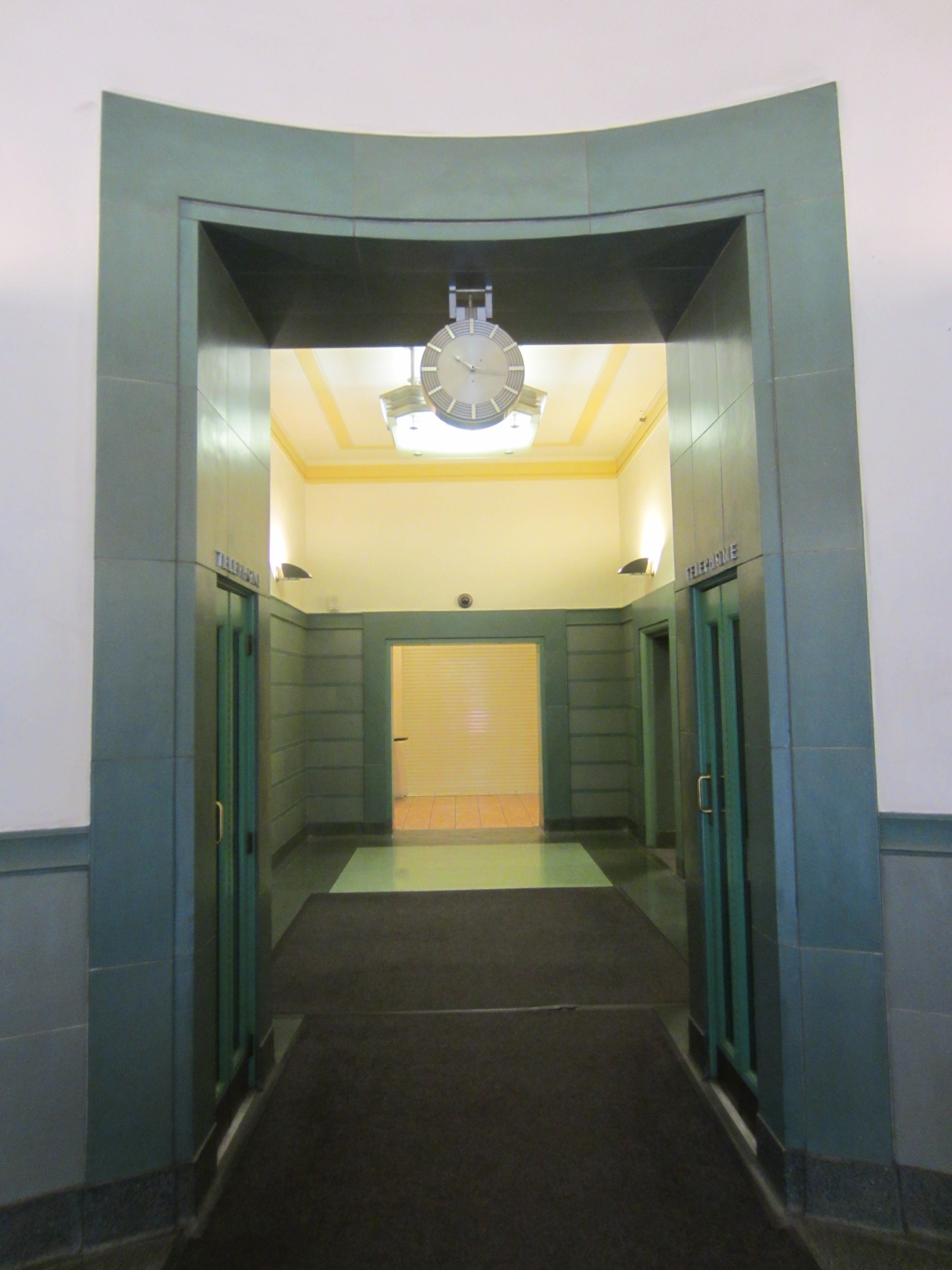
Entrance to elevator lobby

=== History of San Francisco murals in Annex lobby ===
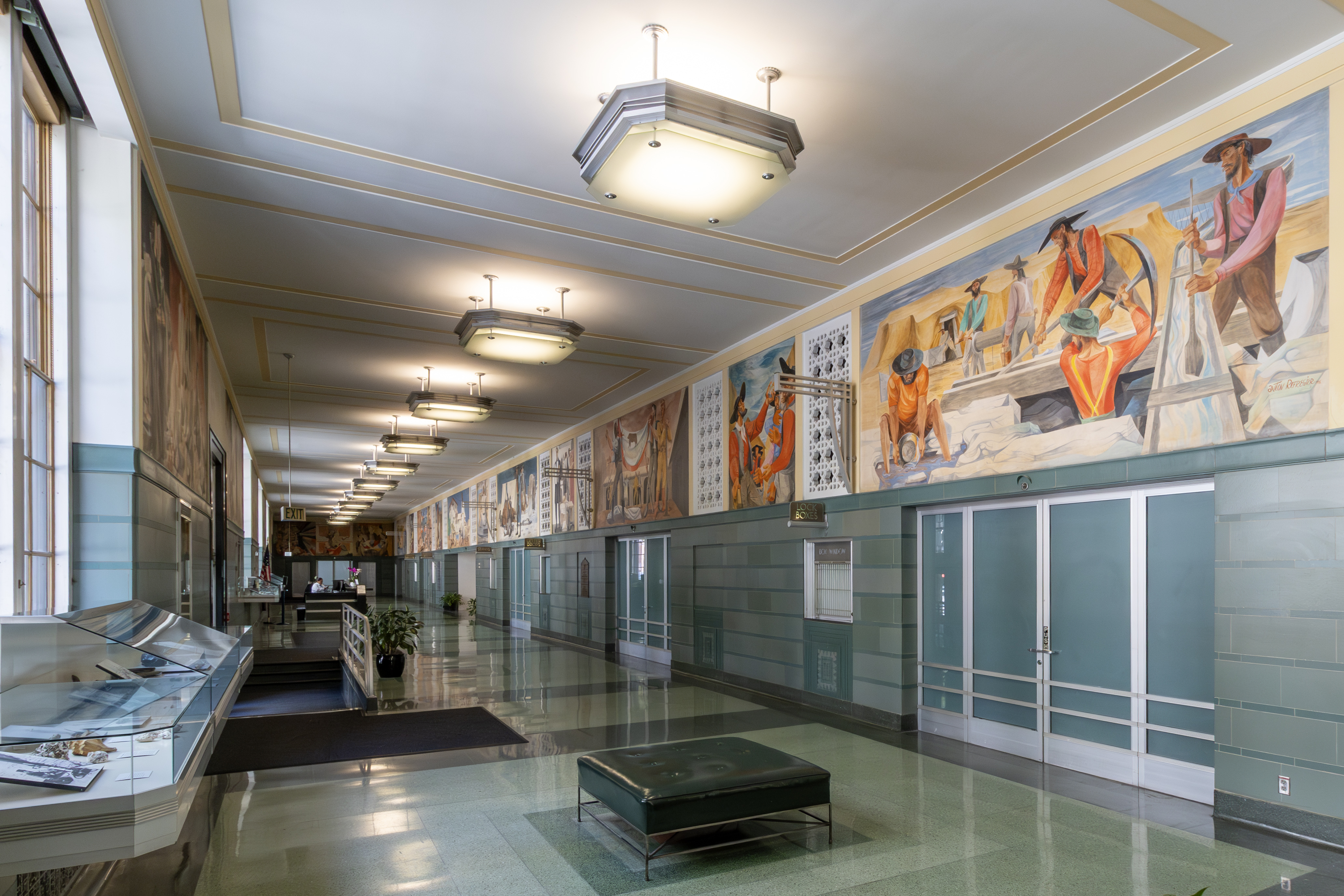
Main lobby of Rincon Annex (parallel to Mission)

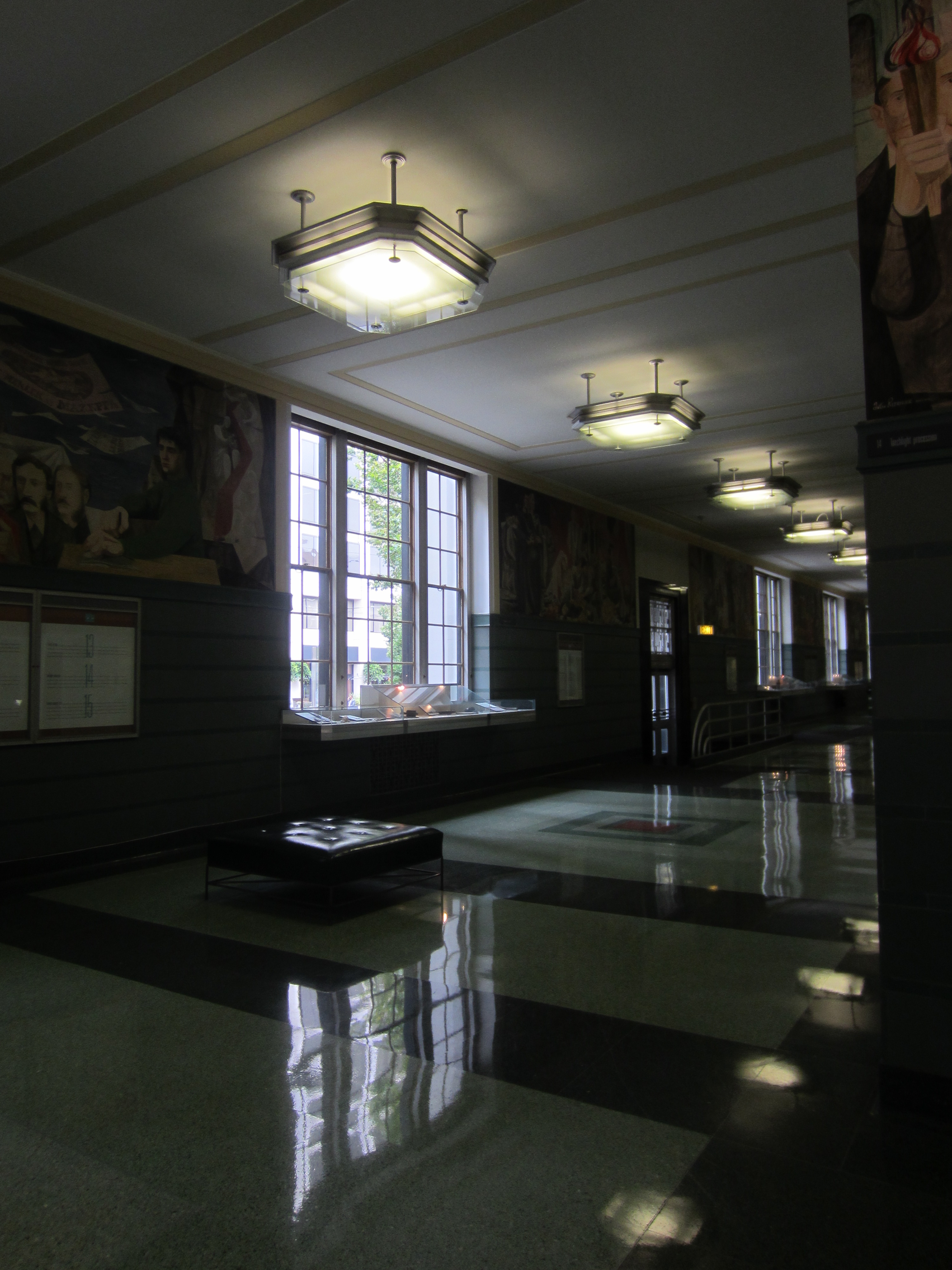
Junction of main and side lobbies of Rincon Annex

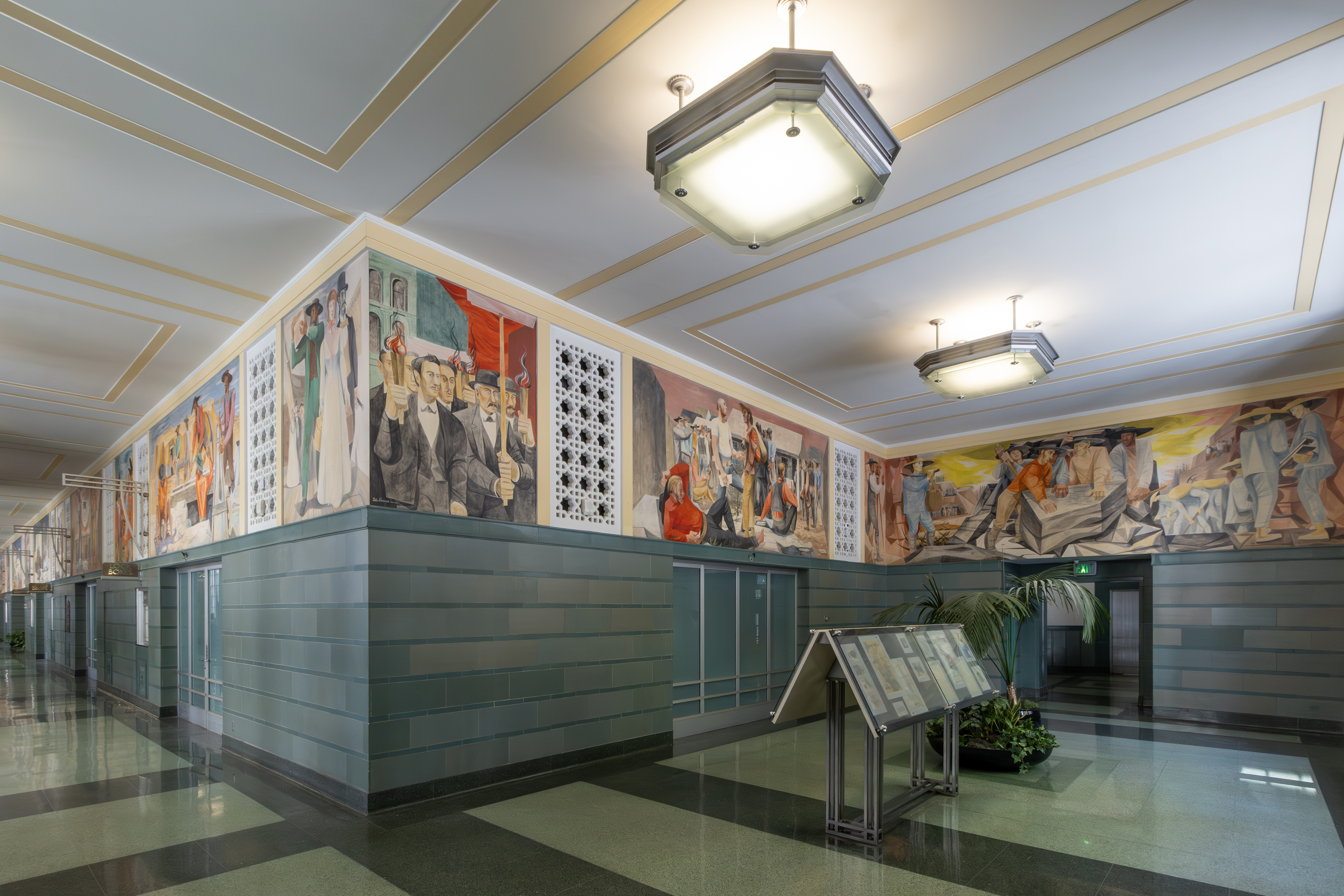
Side lobby of Rincon Annex (parallel to Spear)

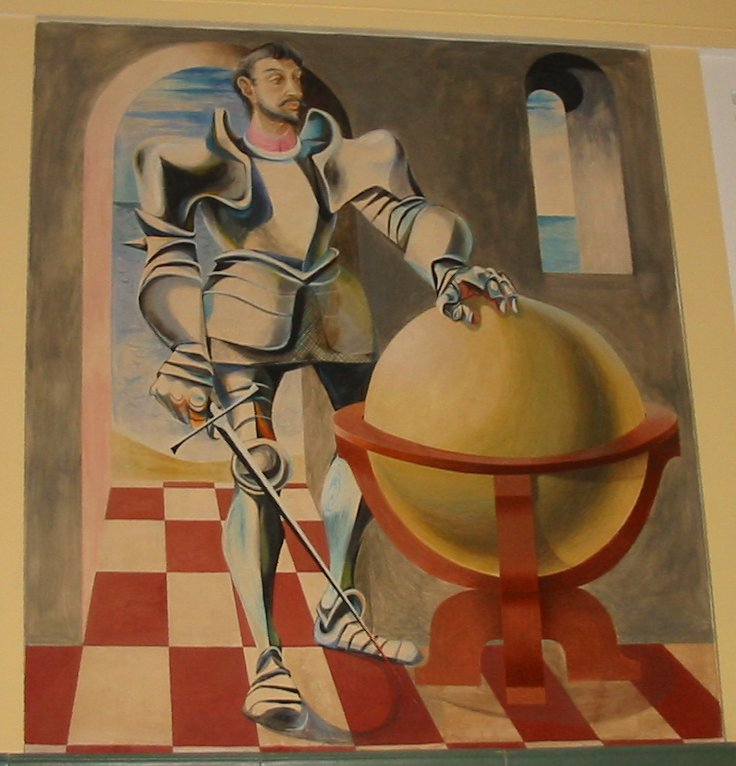
Anton Refregier mural, Panel #3, "Sir Francis Drake"

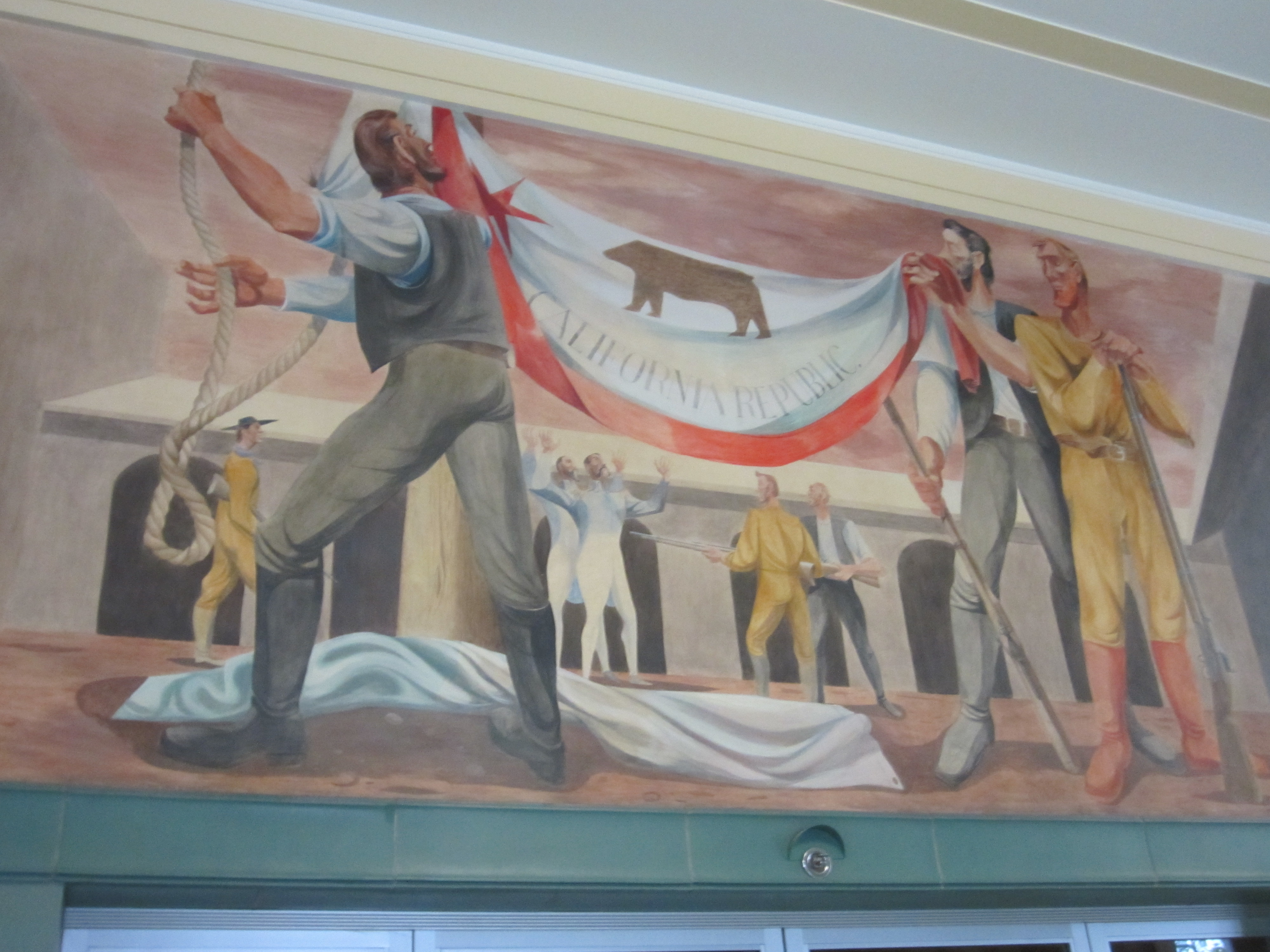
Refregier mural, Panel #10, "Raising the Bear Flag"

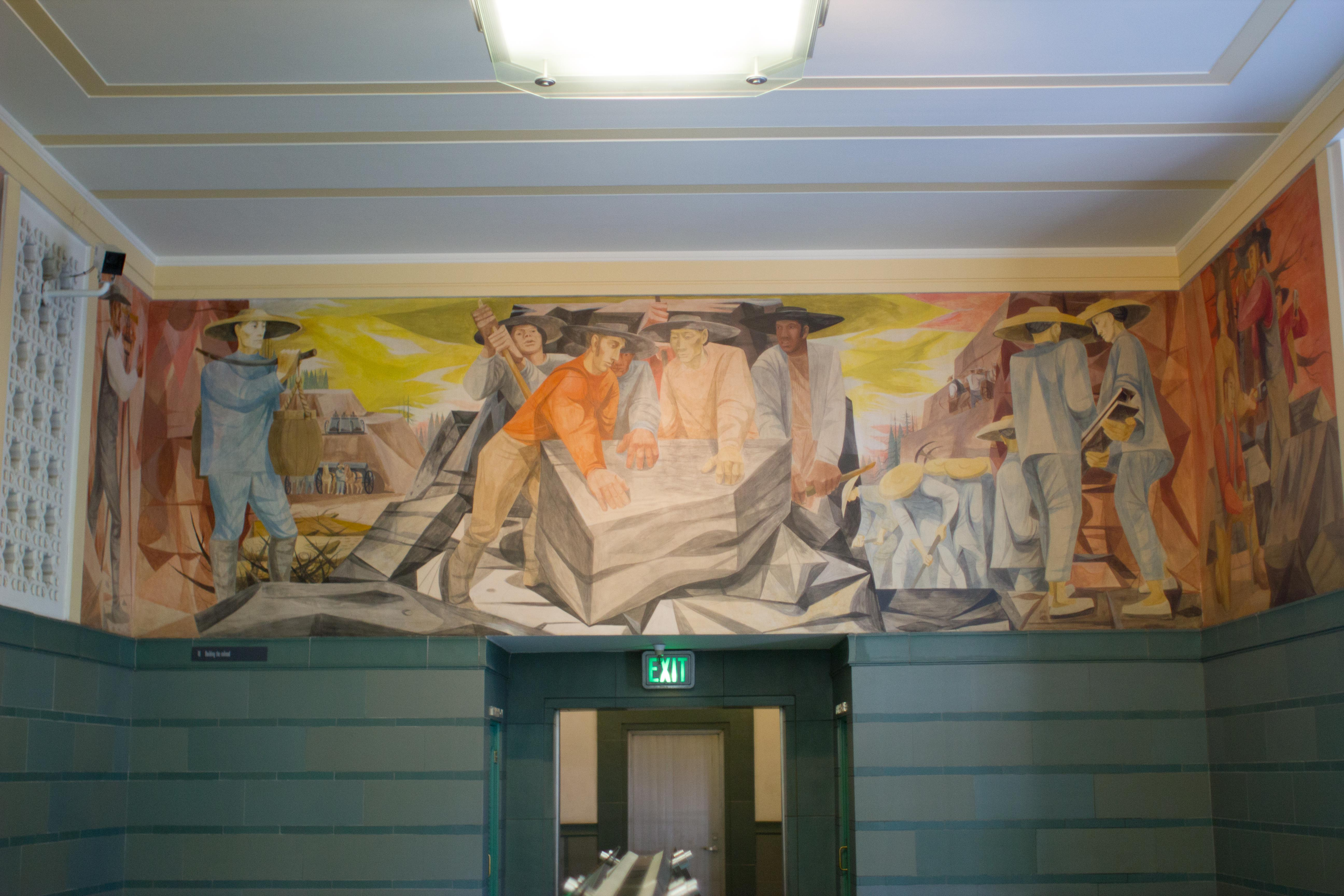
Refregier mural, Panel #16, "Building the Railroad"

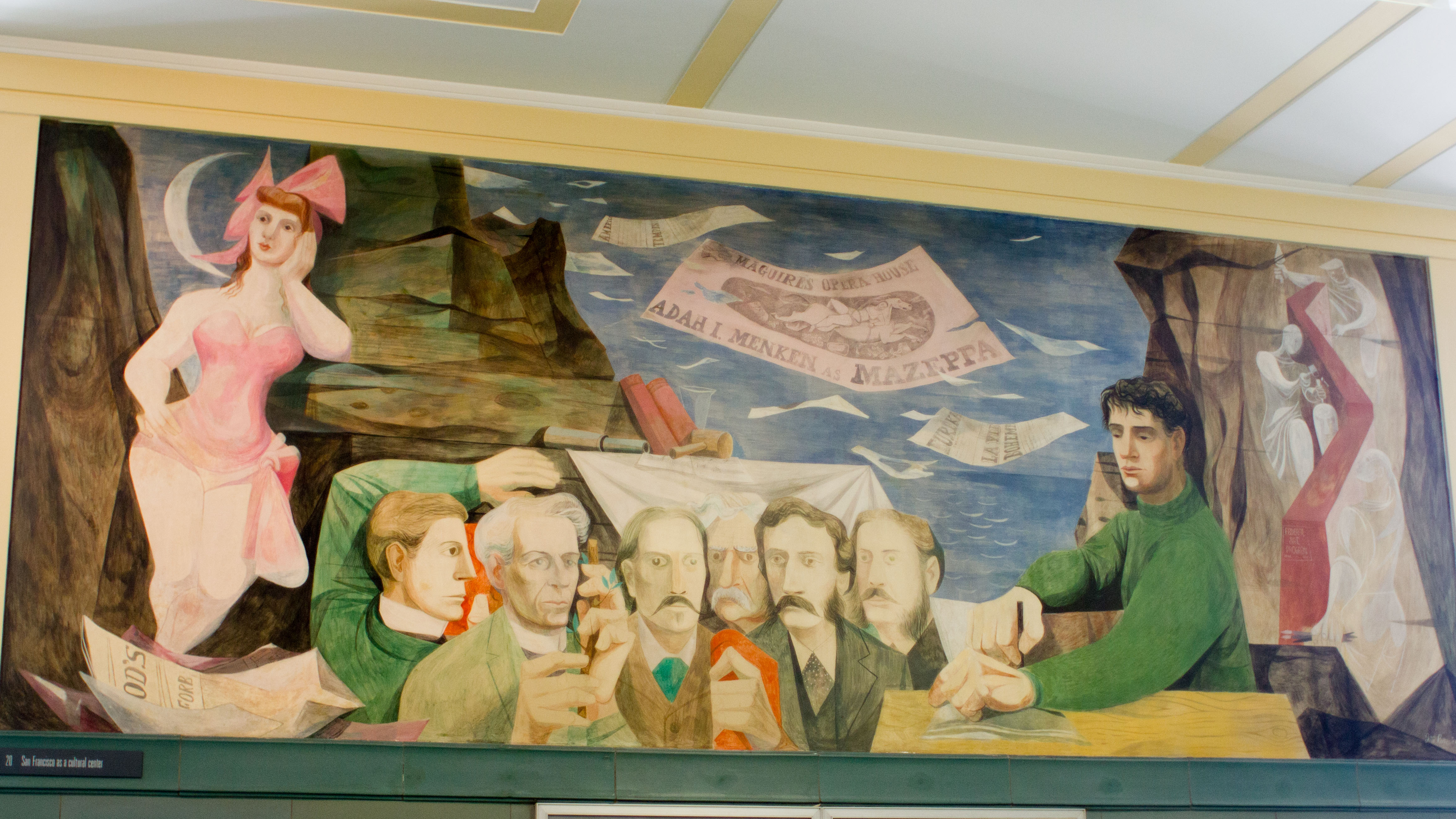
Refregier mural, Panel #20, "San Francisco as a Cultural Center"

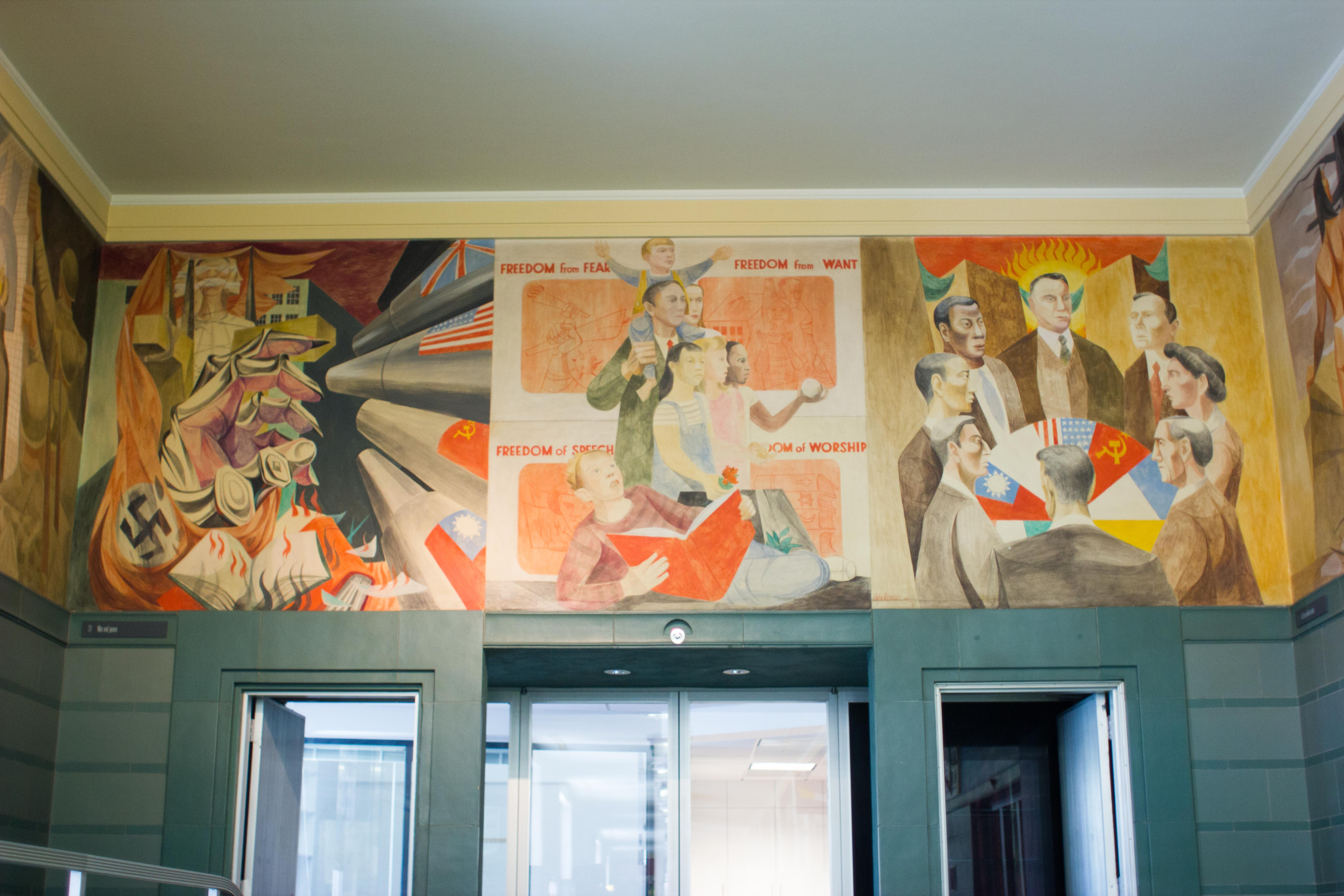
Refregier mural, Panel #27, "War and Peace"

=== Rincon Center commercial building (1988) ===
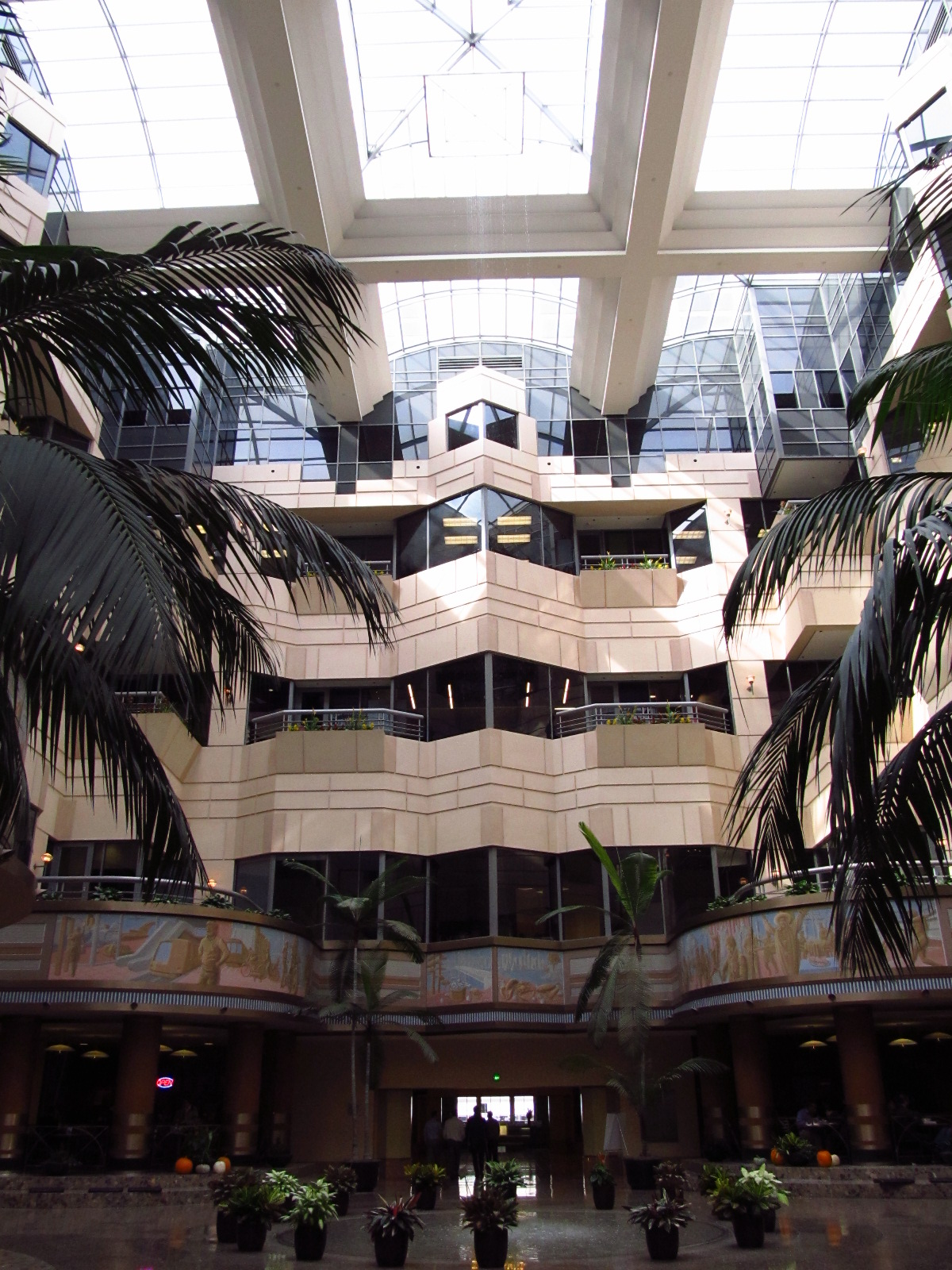
Interior of atrium, view northwest towards Mission Street

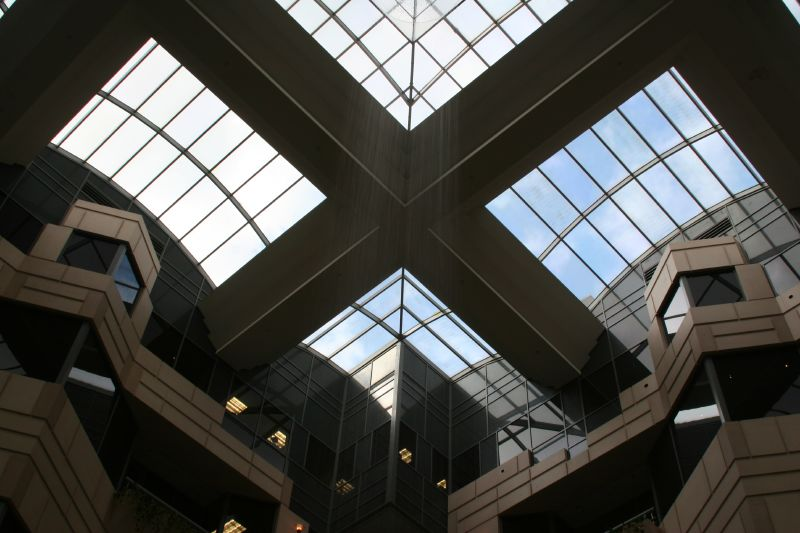
Atrium skylight detail

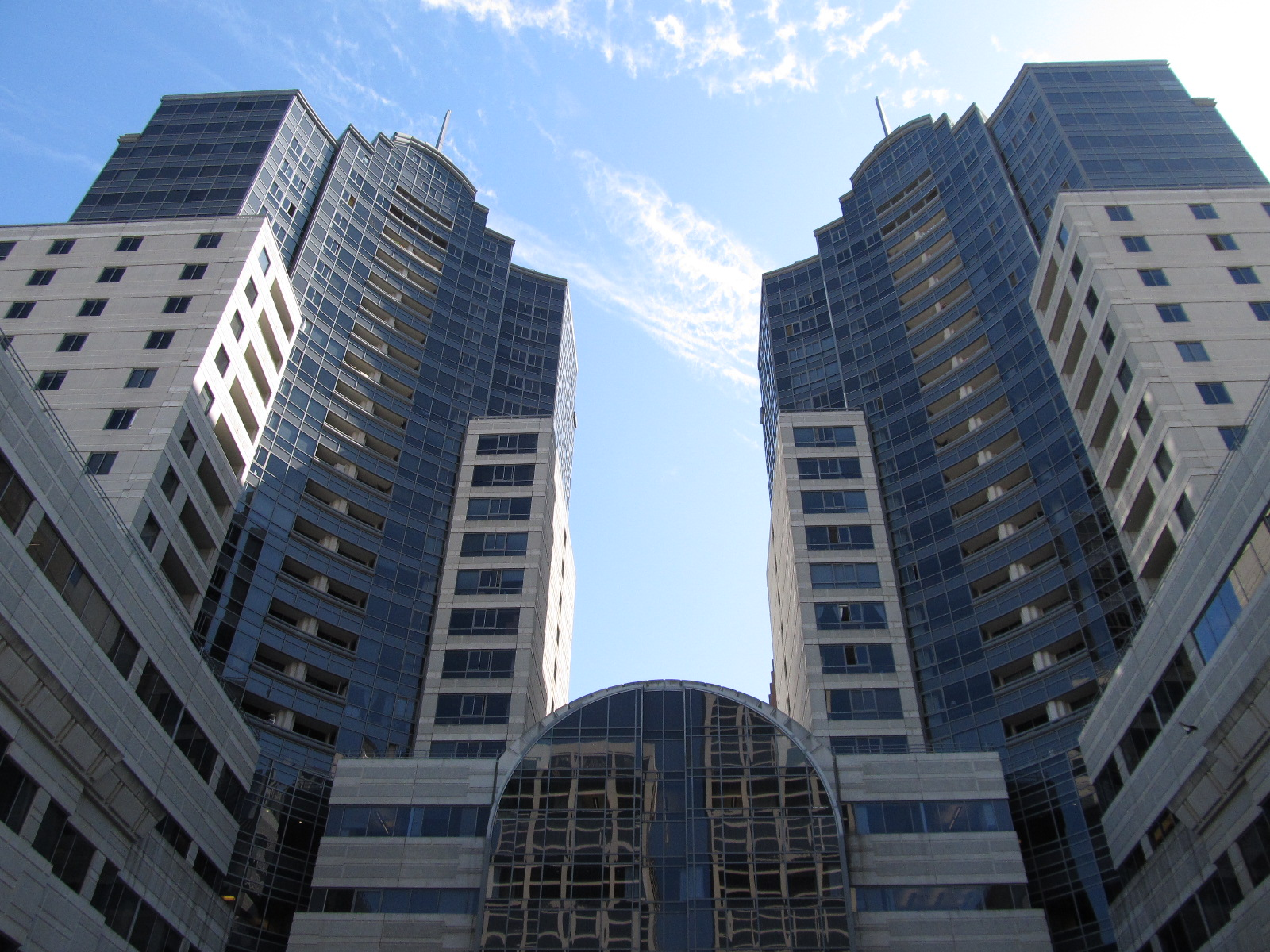
Exterior courtyard of 1988 commercial building and residence towers, view southeast towards Howard Street

== See also ==
- List of United States post offices
- San Francisco Redevelopment Agency
