= Anton Refregier =

Russian-American painter (1905–1979)

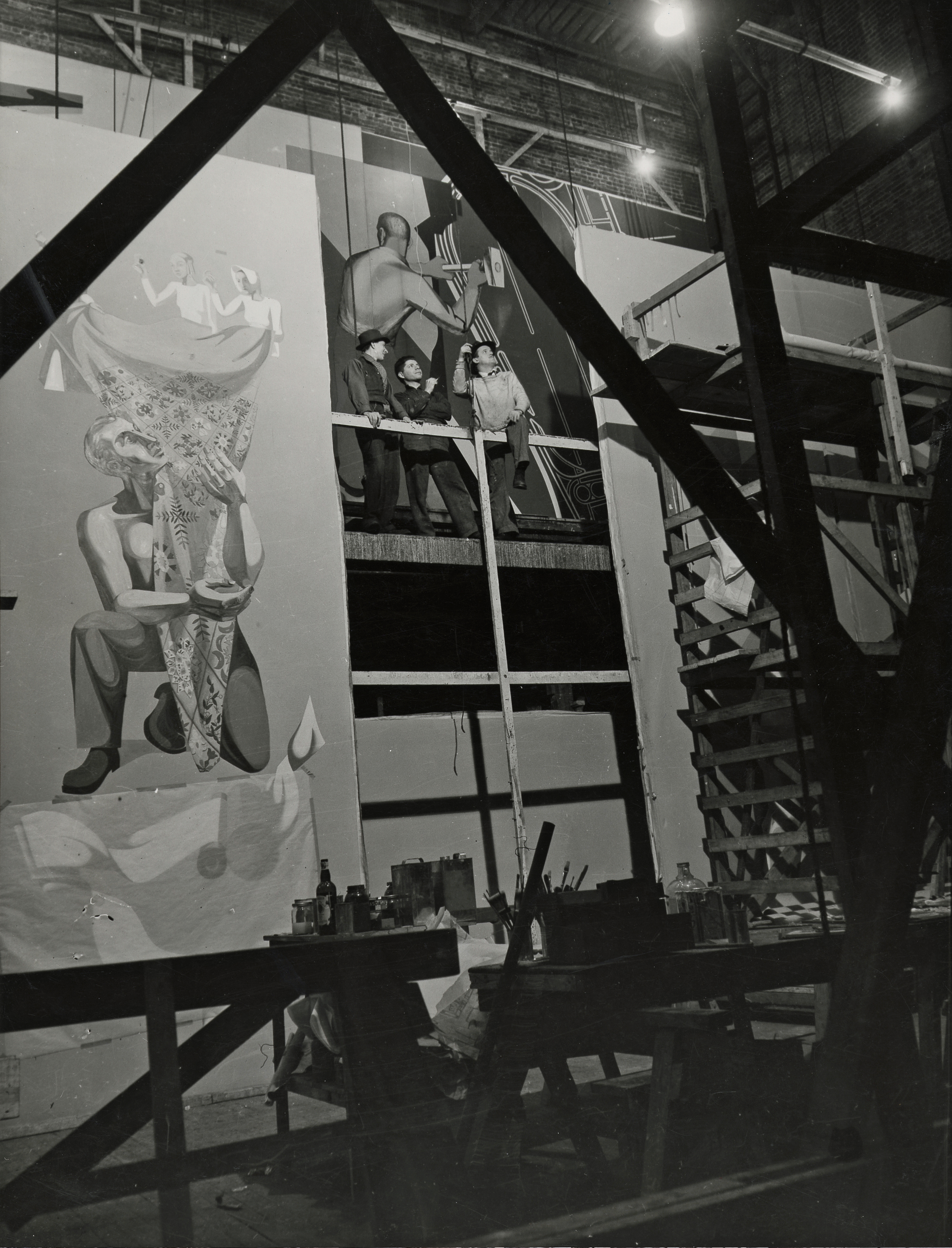
Refregier on scaffold at work on mural at WPA Building of the 1939 N.Y. World's Fair. Photographed for the Works Progress Administration.

Anton Refregier (March 20, 1905 – October 10, 1979) was a painter and muralist active in Works Progress Administration Federal Art Project commissions, and in teaching art. He was a Russian immigrant to the United States.

Among his best-known works is his mural series The History of San Francisco, located in the Rincon Center in downtown San Francisco, California. It depicts the city's history across twenty seven panels that he painted from 1940 to 1948.

== Life and early career ==
Refregier was born in Moscow and emigrated to the United States in 1920. After working various odd jobs in New York City, he earned a scholarship to the Rhode Island School of Design in 1921. After finishing school, Refregier moved back to New York in 1925. To earn a living, Refregier worked for interior decorators, creating replicas of François Boucher and Jean-Honoré Fragonard paintings. He continued his creative development, and traveled to Munich in 1927. While there he studied under painter Hans Hofmann, who was creating abstract expressionism paintings.

Refregier returned to New York state during the late 1920s, and lived in the Mount Airy artists' colony in Croton-on-Hudson. In an interview, Refregier referred to this time as the most wonderful period of his life. He was referring to the effects of the Great Depression in the 1930s. Refregier found inspiration in the tragic events. He was quoted as saying that "the richer we [were] in possessions, the poorer we became in their enjoyment." He said the amazing part of that period was the "human quality, the humanist attitude that [everyone] had" and the discovery that "the artist was not apart from the people." Refregier learned "a lot about life" during these times, and also learned more about the United States economy and government.

=== Federal Art Project — Works Progress Administration ===
He struggled as a muralist until the federal government began the Federal Art Project in 1935, within the Works Progress Administration—WPA (renamed in 1939 the "Works Projects Administration"), that created sponsorship of artists. When asked about the program Refregier said that it was "by the wisdom of one of the greatest Presidents we ever had, Roosevelt, it's common knowledge the WPA, a relief program, was established [because] it was necessary to protect the skills of the American people." Refregier received $23.86 a week on the FAP—WPA rolls.

Refregier was a faculty member and chairman of the Board at the American Artists School from 1937 to 1938. Refregier began to gain notoriety in his field, and so was given the opportunity to choose between two assignments for his first WPA—Federal Art Project. He was given the choice of painting a mural in a courthouse, or in the children's ward of a hospital. Refregier chose the latter, because did not want the pressure inherent in designing public artwork for a courthouse. He was assigned to the children's ward mural project at Green Point Hospital, in Brooklyn. The project took a little over a year to complete, and involved five other contributing artists.

After completing the hospital mural, Refregier's work became primarily government-sponsored projects. These included the World's Fair Federal Works Buildings in the 1933 Chicago World's Fair and the Section of Fine Arts of the Public Building Administration in the Treasury Department. He also worked as a teacher, supervising artist, and a mural supervisor. He collaborated with other contemporary artists, such as Byron Randall.

== Works ==
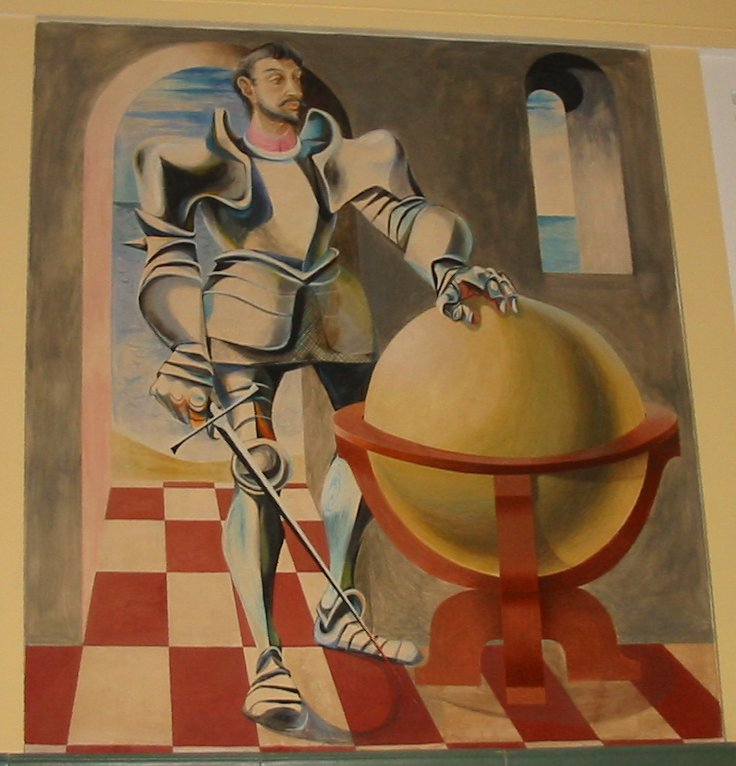
Sir Francis Drake, detail from the Rincon Center murals

Anton Refregier won many mural competitions, and started to gain national renown as a muralist.

=== Rincon Center mural ===
In 1940 he won the commission for his most famous work, the History of San Francisco, located in the lobby of the Rincon Center in San Francisco, California. The Rincon Center once served as a United States post office and was known then as Rincon Annex. Refregier competed with a number of other artists for the commission, first funded as a project of the Section of Painting and Sculpture. Refregier painted the mural with casein tempera on white gesso over plaster walls, in the social realism style. Work restarted after the war, in 1946, and took two years to complete at a cost of $26,000.

==== Subjects and style ====
The mural consisted of 27 panels and covered 2,457 square feet (228.3 m^{2}) of wall space. The mural panels depicted various historical events from California's past. It included the 1877 anti-Chinese Sand Lot riots, the 1934 San Francisco Waterfront Strike, and the Trial of trade unionist Tom Mooney, that was based on fabricated evidence. Refregier used these tragedies as inspiration. Refregier "believed that art must address itself to contemporary issues and that a mural painting in particular must not be 'banal, decorative embellishment,' but a 'meaningful, significant, powerful plastic statement based on the history and lives of the people.'"

The mural also depicted: the California Gold Rush; the 1860s building by Union Pacific of the western First transcontinental railroad; the disastrous 1906 San Francisco earthquake and fire; and further into the twentieth century with the city's Second World War contributions, and culminating in the 1945 signing of the United Nations Charter in the San Francisco War Memorial Opera House. Some were suspicious of Refregier as a communist because of his Russian–USSR background, and his mural topics about social issues. None of this bothered Refregier, who was only concerned about his art.

The style of this historic mural had many of Refregier's key characteristics. The palette was composed of yellows, browns, and grays, punctuated by red in certain areas to evoke emotion. Earthy tones and the lack of bright colors remind viewers of the struggles and hardships he is depicting. Refregier also uses white to represent virtue in those inspired by a cause. His style is very flat and one-dimensional. He uses solid blocks of color to denote shadows, along with depth and shade. His painting style appears to be very rudimentary and simple, but complex because of the way he uses color to evoke emotion and powerful images to tell a story.

==== Responses ====
The History of San Francisco created a heated debate because of the controversial events it depicted from California's past. After all, the mural was located in a public building and Refregier was using public funds to complete it. People believed that it "placed disproportionate emphasis on violence, racial hatred, and class struggle." Republican Senator Hubert B. Scudder and then US Rep. Richard Nixon were involved in Congressional hearings to have the work removed. They claimed it had a communistic tone and "defamed pioneers and reflected negatively on California's past." Many believed that "no artist, however distinguished, escaped the heavy, if well meaning, hand of federal supervision."

In a letter to the editor in 1952, the President of the College Art Association said that "the pro-Chinese sentiments of one section of the murals and indication of the then existing wartime alliance with Russia of another section reflected the realities of the time." The protest was eventually defeated by a group of artists and museum directors.

== Later career ==
After the conflict, Refregier continued to work as an artist, teacher, professor, and judge for various competitions. He was a professor of painting at Bard College in New York from 1962 to 1964. In 1968, he signed the "Writers and Editors War Tax Protest" pledge, vowing to refuse tax payments in protest against the Vietnam War.

Refregier died in 1979 while in Moscow. He was working on a mural for a medical center in his home city. The same year, his Rincon Mural was placed under the protection of the National Register of Historic Places.

== See also ==
- "Anton Refregier's Murals in the Rincon Post Office Annex, San Francisco: A Marxist History of California", by Darren Paul Trebel, A Thesis presented to the Graduate Faculty of the University of Virginia, McIntire Department of Art History, University of Virginia, May 1992.
- Federal Art Project
- List of Federal Art Project artists
- American realism
- Social realism
- Index: Murals

== Notes ==
=== References ===
- Rogallery.com: Anton Refregier biography
- Marquardt, Virginia (1993). "Art on the Political Front in America: From the Liberator to Art Front". Art Journal. 51 (1). College Art Association: 72–81. doi:10.2307/777305. JSTOR 777305. 1543-6322.
- Mathews, Jane de Hart (1976). "Art and Politics in Cold War America". The American Historical Review. 81 (4). American Historical Association: 762–787. doi:10.2307/1864779. JSTOR 1864779. 0002-8762.
- Sawyer, Michelle. "Anton Refregier: Renaissance Man of WPA". Archived from the original on 27 September 2007.
- Trovato, Joseph (1964-11-05). "Tape recorded interview with Anton Refregier".
