= Thomas Carr Howe Jr. =

American military personnel

Thomas Carr Howe Jr. (1904–1994) was director of the California Palace of the Legion of Honor and one of the monuments men involved in the recovery of art looted by the Nazis during the Second World War. Howe died on July 12, 1994, in San Francisco, California, at the age of 89. He graduated from Harvard College.

== Selected publications ==
- Salt Mines and Castles: The Discovery and Restitution of Looted European Art. Bobbs-Merrill Company, Indianapolis, 1946.
