= List of killings by law enforcement officers in the United States in the 1960s =

This is a list of people reported killed by non-military law enforcement officers in the United States in the 1960s, whether in the line of duty or not, and regardless of reason or method. The listing documents the occurrence of a death, making no implications regarding wrongdoing or justification on the part of the person killed or officer involved. Killings are arranged by date of the incident that caused death. Different death dates, if known, are noted in the description. This page lists 175 people.

== 1960s ==
The table below lists 175 people.

Date	Name (age) of deceased	State/Territory (city)	Description
1969-12-30	James Bohan	Ohio (Dayton)	
1969-12-29	Andrew Alvin Chaney (35)	Connecticut (Hartford)	
1969-12-25	James C. Buckner (27)	Ohio (Cleveland)	
1969-12-21	Billy Parker (22)	New Jersey (Millburn)	
1969-12-20	Howard Rowe (54)	Indiana (South Bend)	
1969-12-19	Samuel W. Herston (27)	Delaware (Wilmington)	
1969-12-18	Unnamed person	Delaware (Wilmington)	
1969-12-16	David Eugene Williams (30)	Virginia (Martinsville)	
1969-12-15	Charles L. Crawford (20)	Kentucky (Covington)	
1969-12-14	L. D. Johnson (21)	Michigan (Detroit)	
1969-12-04	Fred Hampton (21)	Illinois (Chicago)	Deputy Chairman of the Black Panther Party killed while sleeping in a raid by Chicago policemen
1969-12-04	Mark Clark (22)	Illinois (Chicago)	Member of the Black Panther Party killed with Fred Hampton by Chicago policemen
1969-11-30	Raymond C. Bryant (16)	North Carolina (Jacksonville)	
1969-11-28	James B. Sherbondy (49)	Colorado (Denver)	
1969-11-28	Joseph R. Hurley (24)	California (Burbank)	
1969-11-28	Gerardo Brewster	New York (Queens)	
1969-11-28	Unnamed man	New York (Queens)	
1969-11-22	Billy Joe New (21)	Texas (Dallas)	
1969-11-21	David Martin (33)	California (San Francisco)	
1969-11-19	John Super	New York (Brooklyn)	
1969-11-19	Joe [surname unknown]	New York (Brooklyn)	
1969-11-16	Harrison Ward Jr. (27)	Michigan (Detroit)	
1969-11-15	Riley Towns (20)	Ohio (Columbus)	
1969-11-11	Elmer Howard (28)	Indiana (Logansport)	
1969-11-08	David Anders (31)	Alabama (Huntsville)	
1969-11-07	Joseph H. Amberson (48)	California (Concord)	
1969-11-02	Daniel P. Anderson (39)	California (Los Angeles)	
1969-10-30	Anthony Bullard (17)	Michigan (Detroit)	
1969-10-29	Emery W. Scheideloffer (40)	Ohio (Madison)	
1969-10-22	Unnamed man	New York (Queens)	
1969-10-21	Richard Broucek (19)	Illinois (Carthage)	
1969-09-30	Thomas, Johnny Lee (26)	Texas (Dallas)	Thomas opened fire from his home on pedestrians, killing one person and wounding seven others, including four police officers. He was shot dead by police.
1969-07-23	John R. Schimke (32)	Michigan (Grand Rapids)	
1969-06-12	Donald Oughton (29)	California (Los Angeles)	
1969-05-19	Rector, James	California (Berkeley)	Police shot and killed Rector, a bystander at the People's Park protest.
1969-05-17	Gary Lockwood	Michigan (Detroit)	
1969-04-24	Anthony Volk (50 or 59)	Ohio (Cleveland)	
1969-04-20	George Salinas Fernandez (40)	Texas (San Benito)	
1969-04-18	Roosevelt Jackson (24)	Mississippi (Port Gibson)	
1969-04-17	Gene Chaves (31)	Kansas (Wichita)	
1969-04-16	Victor J. Cardova (30)	Minnesota (Minneapolis)	
1968-12-29	Eloy Vidal (17)	Texas (San Antonio)	
1968-12-28	Frederick Stinson (20)	New Jersey (Mount Holly)	
1968-12-24	Robert Charles Osby (21)	California (Los Angeles)	
1968-12-22	Jerry Dean Cloud (24)	Texas (Waco)	
1968-12-22	Joe Spates (20)	California (Oroville)	
1968-12-21	Marilyn Parker (30)	Massachusetts (Boston)	
1968-12-21	Unidentified man	Massachusetts (Boston)	
1968-12-21	Theodore Xanthis (35)	California (Hermosa Beach)	
1968-12-21	Walter Alfonso Spann (25)	Florida (Gainesville)	
1968-12-21	Unnamed man	Georgia (Twin City)	The man, a former mental patient, had allegedly killed a police chief earlier in the year. According to a radio dispatcher, "they cornered him and killed him."
1968-12-12	Thomas Evan Jackson (19)	Arizona (Phoenix)	Jackson was shot to death by police while he and his friends tried to steal a Christmas tree. He was unarmed, but holding a piece of wood.
1968-12-08	Rueben Magana Espinoza (51)	California (Long Beach)	
1968-12-08	John William Van Huystee (30)	California (San Jose)	
1968-12-06	Joseph J. Lawdanski (28)	New Jersey (Hudson City)	
1968-12-05	Lee Andrew Givan (44)	Kansas (Kansas City)	
1968-12-01	Dennis Lucero (20)	California (San Jose)	Lucero was unarmed and running away from a suspected burglary.
1968-11-30	Melvin Earl Jr. (32)	California (Los Angeles)	
1968-09-13	Gary McGivern (23)	New York (Plattekill)	
1968-07-20	Jack Weninger (28)	Florida (Miami)	
1968-07-03	Angel Angelof	New York (Manhattan)	
1968-05-23	Henry Dumas (33)	New York (Manhattan)	Dumas, a writer, allegedly assaulted a police officer with a knife and was shot and killed.
1968-04-06	Bobby Hutton (17)	California (Oakland)	Hutton, a member of the Black Panthers, was shot dead by officers in unclear circumstances.
1968-02-09	Unidentified male	California (Los Angeles)	A male aged 15–20 was allegedly involved in a robbery and confronted by police. Upon an attempt to escape, two officers opened fire, killing him.
1968-02-08	Samuel Hammond Jr. (18)	South Carolina (Orangeburg)	Orangeburg massacre
1968-02-08	Delano Herman Middleton (17)	South Carolina (Orangeburg)	Orangeburg massacre
1968-02-08	Henry Ezekial Smith (19)	South Carolina (Orangeburg)	Orangeburg massacre
1968-01-29	Christopher Booker (32)	New York (Brooklyn)	
1967-08-12	Pauline Mullins Pusser (33)	Tennessee (McNairy County)	Mullins Pusser accompanied her husband, Sheriff Buford Pusser, on a ride-along for what Buford Pusser said was a disturbance call. Buford Pusser claimed that a vehicle pulled up alongside them and opened fire, injuring him and killing Pauline. No arrests were made in her murder. In 2025, the Tennessee Bureau of Investigation and the district attorney announced that they believed Buford Pusser likely killed Pauline and staged the scene to make it appear like an ambush.
1967-07-29	Ernest Roquemore (19)	Michigan (Detroit)	Police and paratroopers opened fire on a crowd of people while searching for looters, killing Roquemore and wounding three others. Police said they fired because of a person holding a gun, but it was a transistor radio.
1967-07-28	Palmer Gray (21)	Michigan (Detroit)	Police were called to Palmer Gray Jr.'s home after he threatened to kill his father at their home. Officer David Senak shot him after he refused to drop his weapon. Senak had previously killed Joseph Chandler on July 24 and was suspected of killing Carl Cooper on July 26.
1967-07-28	William Dalton (19)	Michigan (Detroit)	Dalton was shot by police who detained him for a curfew violation. Police said he was shot when he was fleeing, but witnesses said officers took him to an alley and shot him.
1967-07-26	John LeRoy (30)	Michigan (Detroit)	LeRoy and four friends went to check on the pregnant wife of one of the friends. They passed a National Guard checkpoint and received permission to proceed. Later in the route, they passed a National Guard Jeep, where Guardsmen opened fire, hitting LeRoy and two of his friends, including the one whose wife they were visiting. LeRoy died in the hospital three days later.
1967-07-26	Carl Cooper (17)	Michigan (Detroit)	Algiers Motel incident: Police shot three people during the 1967 Detroit riots in the Algiers Motel. The officers who shot Pollard and Temple were prosecuted for murder, but their charges were either dismissed or they were acquitted. The officer believed to have shot Cooper was prosecuted for conspiracy, but his case was dismissed.
1967-07-26	Aubrey Pollard (19)	Michigan (Detroit)	Algiers Motel incident: Police shot three people during the 1967 Detroit riots in the Algiers Motel. The officers who shot Pollard and Temple were prosecuted for murder, but their charges were either dismissed or they were acquitted. The officer believed to have shot Cooper was prosecuted for conspiracy, but his case was dismissed.
1967-07-26	Fred Temple (18)	Michigan (Detroit)	Algiers Motel incident: Police shot three people during the 1967 Detroit riots in the Algiers Motel. The officers who shot Pollard and Temple were prosecuted for murder, but their charges were either dismissed or they were acquitted. The officer believed to have shot Cooper was prosecuted for conspiracy, but his case was dismissed.
1967-07-26	Helen Hall (51)	Michigan (Detroit)	Hall, a white woman from Connecticut on a business trip in Detroit, was looking out a hotel window with other guests when she was killed by a National Guard bullet fired through the window.
1967-07-26	Larry Post (30)	Michigan (Detroit)	Post, a white National Guard member, was mistakenly shot by other Guardsmen after a vehicle drove through a roadblock. There were no weapons in the vehicle. The three men in the vehicle were charged with assault with intent to murder, but the prosecutor reduced their charges to a curfew violation.
1967-07-26	George Talbert (20)	Michigan (Detroit)	Talbert and a friend were shot by a National Guard Specialist. The specialist claimed Talbert had charged at him and threatened to cut his throat, but a Detroit Free Press investigation determined Talbert was unarmed. He died of his injuries ten days after the shooting.
1967-07-26	Julius Lust (26)	Michigan (Detroit)	Police shot Lust at a junkyard after he made "some sort of motion" with his left hand.
1967-07-26	Robinson, Albert (38)	Michigan (Detroit)	Robinson was taking out the trash when National Guardsmen hit him with a bayonette and shot him. Police stated Robinson was a sniper who was trying to escape, but no weapons were found in Robinson's apartment.
1967-07-25	Jose Rodriguez	New York (Bronx)	
1967-07-25	Henry Denson (27)	Michigan (Detroit)	National Guardsmen shot at a car driving around five miles per hour near a checkpoint, killing Denson, a passenger. Two Newsweek reporters on the scene stated that one of the Guardsmen has yelled "Get 'em" as the vehicle neared. The driver of the vehicle was charged with assault but was acquitted. The Guardsmen were not charged.
1967-07-25	Julius Dorsey (55)	Michigan (Detroit)	Dorsey, a black security guard, was guarding a store from looters. After firing his pistol to frighten off looters, Dorsey was shot by either Detroit Police or National Guardsmen firing at a group of fleeing looters.
1967-07-25	Emanuel Cosbey (26)	Michigan (Detroit)	Officers responding to a looting called fired at a group of fleeing suspects, killing Cosbey.
1967-07-25	Ronald Evans (24)	Michigan (Detroit)	Police arrested Evans and Jones for stealing beer from a corner store. At some point Evans started to run, and officers shot at him 14 times. Witnesses claimed officers had forced Evans to run before they shot at him. Police then shot Jones as he also attempted to run.
1967-07-25	William Jones (23)	Michigan (Detroit)	Police arrested Evans and Jones for stealing beer from a corner store. At some point Evans started to run, and officers shot at him 14 times. Witnesses claimed officers had forced Evans to run before they shot at him. Police then shot Jones as he also attempted to run.
1967-07-25	Roy Banks (46)	Michigan (Detroit)	National Guardsmen shot Banks, a deaf man, as he walked to catch a bus to his job. He died of his wounds on August 14. Police stated Banks was a suspected looter, but the owner of the tavern he was suspected of looting disputed this.
1967-07-25	Arthur Johnson (36)	Michigan (Detroit)	Police shot Johnson and Williams inside a looted pawn shop. The officers claimed they shot the men after Johnson wielded a club, although officers did not produce it.
1967-07-25	Perry Williams (33)	Michigan (Detroit)	Police shot Johnson and Williams inside a looted pawn shop. The officers claimed they shot the men after Johnson wielded a club, although officers did not produce it.
1967-07-25	Jack Sydnor (38)	Michigan (Detroit)	Police were called after Sydnor fired a .32 caliber pistol out of his apartment window. When police and National Guardsmen entered, Sydnor shot and wounded one of them. Police fired back and launched tear gas; Sydnor jumped out of his window, dying from either the fall or his gunshot wounds.
1967-07-25	Tonia Blanding (4)	Michigan (Detroit)	Following false reports of snipers, a National Guard tank was sent to Blanding's neighborhood. When someone lit a cigarette in her apartment building, National Guardsmen opened fired, hitting Blanding.
1967-07-24	Clifton Pryor (23)	Michigan (Detroit)	During the 1967 Detroit riot, Pryor, a white man, climbed onto the roof of his apartment building with some neighbors to watch the riots and look for arson. Their apartment manager advised them to get down, as they could be mistaken for snipers since one of them had a shotgun. As the men went down, a National Guardsman shot Pryor on a landing. The Guardsmen said that Pryor was holding the shotgun, but another man present insisted that he was the one with the shotgun.
1967-07-24	Robert Beal (49)	Michigan (Detroit)	A patrolman shot Beal inside a looted drug store. The initial report said that Beal had been shot from a vehicle while fleeing, but the later report said he was shot after he "made a sudden move" towards the officers.
1967-07-24	Joseph Chandler (34)	Michigan (Detroit)	Two police officers chased Chandler for looting and shot him as he ran down an alley and climbed a fence. The officers left the scene, believing they had missed.
1967-07-24	Herman Canty (46)	Michigan (Detroit)	A police officer shot Canty as he drove away from a supermarket, which a witness said he had looted.
1967-07-24	Alfred Peachlum (36)	Michigan (Detroit)	Police saw Peachlum and another man inside a grocery store and opened fired after seeing something shiny in his hand. Peachlum was holding beef wrapped in tin foil. Police bullets also wounded two women across the street from the store.
1967-07-24	Alphonso Smith (35)	Michigan (Detroit)	A patrolman shot Smith inside a looted supermarket. The officer claimed he had slipped on debris and accidentally shot Smith, who had thrown a can at him, while witnesses said that the officer fired through a window.
1967-07-24	Mike Williams (16)	Michigan (Detroit)	A state trooper shot two black men who had looted a warehouse because they did not stop on command. Williams died on the scene, while the other man was hospitalized.
1967-07-24	Edward Kemp (35)	Michigan (Detroit)	A patrolman shot Kemp from a car as he fled holding stolen cigars.
1967-07-24	Richard Sims (35)	Michigan (Detroit)	Four police officers chased Sims after he allegedly tried to break into a bar. After surrounding him in front of a locked door, several officers shot him.
1967-07-24	Frank Tanner (19)	Michigan (Detroit)	Police and National Guardsmen fired at a group of youths stealing alcohol from a store, hitting Tanner, who was holding a cardboard box.
1967-07-24	Carl Smith (30)	Michigan (Detroit)	Smith, a frefighter, was working when he was shot in the head. A police investigation and media investigations concluded that Smith was most likely shot by a National Guardsman, as the shot came from ground level, whereas snipers were located on roofs.
1967-07-24	Tommie Wright (22)	New York (Rochester)	
1967-07-17	Raymond Gilmer (20)	New Jersey (Newark)	A detective in a vehicle shot Gilmer as he ran away.
1967-07-16	Michael Pugh (12)	New Jersey (Newark)	National Guardsmen shot Pugh as he took out his family's garbage.
1967-07-16	James Rutledge (19)	New Jersey (Newark)	State police encountered Rutledge in a vandalized liquor store. When he got up to surrender, officers shot him 39 times.
1967-07-15	Eloise Spellman (42)	New Jersey (Newark)	During the 1967 Newark riots National Guardsmen and state troopers fired at Spellman as she closed her apartment's window after she was mistaken for a sniper. Brown, 29, and Gainer, 53, were also shot.
1967-07-15	Rebecca Brown (29)	New Jersey (Newark)	During the 1967 Newark riots National Guardsmen and state troopers fired at Spellman as she closed her apartment's window after she was mistaken for a sniper. Brown, 29, and Gainer, 53, were also shot.
1967-07-15	Hattie Gainer (53)	New Jersey (Newark)	During the 1967 Newark riots National Guardsmen and state troopers fired at Spellman as she closed her apartment's window after she was mistaken for a sniper. Brown, 29, and Gainer, 53, were also shot.
1967-07-15	William Furr(25)	New Jersey (Newark)	Police shot Furr as he fled a burglarized liquor store.
1967-07-15	Raymond Hawk (24)	New Jersey (Newark)	Police shot Hawk after he ran towards them holding a pipe.
1967-07-14	Rose Abraham (45)	New Jersey (Newark)	Police shot Abraham as they cleared a crowd. Abraham was the first person to be killed during the 1967 Newark riots.
1967-07-14	Eddie Moss (10)	New Jersey (Newark)	National Guardsmen fired at a vehicle as it slowly approached a checkpoint. After the vehicle drove through several more checkpoints, other Guardsmen fired, killing 10-year-old Moss sitting in the backseat.
1967-07-14	Robert Lee Martin (23)	New Jersey (Newark)	Police shot Martin as he walked home from the grocery store.
1967-07-14	Isaac Harrison (73)	New Jersey (Newark)	Police fired at a crowd following reported sniper fire, which may have actually been from other officers shooting Robert Lee Martin nearby. Harrison, a 73-year-old man from Jamaica, was shot and killed.
1967-07-14	Albert Mersier (20)	New Jersey (Newark)	Police shot Mersier in the back as he fled an electric motor store.
1967-07-14	Rufus Council (35)	New Jersey (Newark)	Police shot Council from a vehicle as he stood in the doorframe of a restaurant.
1967-07-14	Tedock Bell (28)	New Jersey (Newark)	Bell and his family were walking to the tavern Bell worked at to check on it when an unidentified officer shot him.
1967-07-14	Leroy Boyd (34)	New Jersey (Newark)	Boyd died after an officer shot him in the back. A grand jury report said the officer mistakenly fired his gun.
1967-07-14	Cornelius Murray (29)	New Jersey (Newark)	Murray was shot by police while standing with friends.
1967-07-14	Oscar Hill (50)	New Jersey (Newark)	Hill was shot while walking to work. According to a witness and friend of Hill, a police officer shot Hill.
1967-07-14	Richard Taliaferro (25)	New Jersey (Newark)	Police shot Taliaferro as he fled.
1967-07-14	James Sanders (16)	New Jersey (Newark)	Police shot Sanders as he fled a looted liquor store.
1967-01-28	Barry Allen (17)	New York (Queens)	
1967-01-28	Unnamed girl (10)	Illinois (Chicago)	
1966-09-27	Matthew 'Peanut' Johnson (16)	California (San Francisco)	16 year-old shot in the back by patrolman Alvin Johnson (no relation); his death led to the Hunters Point social uprising (1966)
1966-09-12	Booker T. Washington (38)	New York (Manhattan)	
1966-08-19	Frank Buffamante (23)	New York (Queens)	
1966-08-19	Michael McBrien (23)	New York (Queens)	
1966-08-09	Michael Bell (14)	New York (Long Island)	
1966-08-01	Charles Whitman (25)	Texas (Austin)	University of Texas tower shooting
1966-05-25	Albert Bunn (33)	Connecticut (Bristol)	
1966-03-19	Harvey LeRoy Baker (33)	Oregon (Eugene)	
1965-12-05	Willie Tucker (28)	South Carolina (Liberty)	
1965-08-20	Jonathan Daniels (26)	Alabama (Hayneville)	Daniels, a white Episcopal seminarian and civil rights activist, was arrested alongside other protesters who were picketing whites-only stores. After being released from jail, he and three other activists went to a nearby store to buy a drink. Off-duty Special Deputy Tom L. Coleman, barring the store, attempted to shoot Ruby Sales, but Daniels shoved her down and was struck instead. Coleman was charged with manslaughter but was acquitted by an all-white jury.
1965-04-09	Frank Cardinale (32)	New York (Long Island)	
1964-11-03	Charles Palagonia (18)	New York (Brooklyn)	
1964-06-28	William Westbrook (18)	New York (Queens)	
1964-01-30	Moses Ward (20)	New York (Staten Island)	
1963-09-03	Harry Potak (24)	New York (Bronx)	
1963-06-06	Morris Lewis (18)	New York (Brooklyn)	
1963-04-08	Frank Sperduto (30)	New York (Manhattan)	
1962-02-02	Unnamed man	New York (East New York)	
1961-09-10	Terry Pinchook (18)	Minnesota (St. Paul)	
1961-07-25	Lawrence Williams (26)	New York (New York)	
1961-07-20	Robert Shackleford (26)	Missouri (St. Louis, Missouri)	Shackleford, a former mental patient, opened fire with a revolver in the receiving room of a hospital. Two police officers were shot and wounded before Shackleford was shot dead by police.
1961-07-01	Raymond Eugene Jones (29)	Virginia (Tappahannock)	
1961-05-29	Clewiston Jones (19)	Missouri (St. Louis)	
1961-05-28	Clifford Thompson (45)	Illinois (Centralia)	
1961-05-22	Jimmie Lee Hopper (36)	Georgia (Valdosta)	
1961-04-29	Elmer Hunter (46)	Illinois (Alton)	
1961-04-18	Joe Love (46)	California (Oakland)	
1961-04-03	Harris Dobbs (26)	Ohio (Cleveland)	
1961-03-20	Chester "Slim" Tatum (43)	Texas (Slaton)	
1961-03-17	Charles Black (35)	Nevada (Reno)	
1961-03-13	Gerald Timothy O'Hern (24)	Michigan (Glendale)	
1961-03-13	Bedell Beavers (39)	Ohio (Warren)	
1961-03-03	Willie "Eagle Eye" Gray (48)	North Carolina (Southern Pines)	
1961-02-18	Joseph Albert Carmichael (25)	Tennessee (Nashville)	
1961-02-12	Jared Vasey (8)	Florida (Fort Lauderdale)	
1961-02-08	Manuel Ray Tackett (27)	Ohio (Mansfield)	
1961-02-04	Carmin Fuscelaro Jr. (38)	New Jersey (Camden)	
1961-01-24	Ralph H. Wilson (42)	Florida (Pompano Beach)	
1961-01-08	Robert "Rocky" W. Herring (30)	California (San Bruno)	
1960-12-26	Daniel O. Otts Jr (39)	Arkansas (Ozark)	
1960-12-24	Jackie Michael Prough (23)	California (Ontario)	
1960-12-21	Paul James Sonnefield (41)	Kansas (Kansas City)	
1960-12-08	Lonnie Anderson (25)	New York (Brooklyn)	
1960-12-03	Raymond McAvoy (31)	New York (Brooklyn)	
1960-11-02	Robert Brammer (30)	Indiana (New Castle)	
1960-09-15	Joe Ray Marris (22)	California (Reseda)	
1960-09-03	Lloyd "Tex" Whaley (35)	Oklahoma (Oklahoma City)	
1960-04-02	Raymond Gannaway (17)	New York (Brooklyn)	
1960-02-?	Unnamed man	Pennsylvania (Chalk Hill)	A man killed four people and wounded five others before being killed by police.
