= 1963 San Francisco mayoral election =

- November 5, 1963
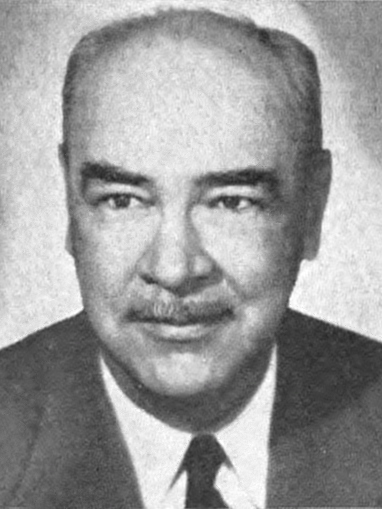

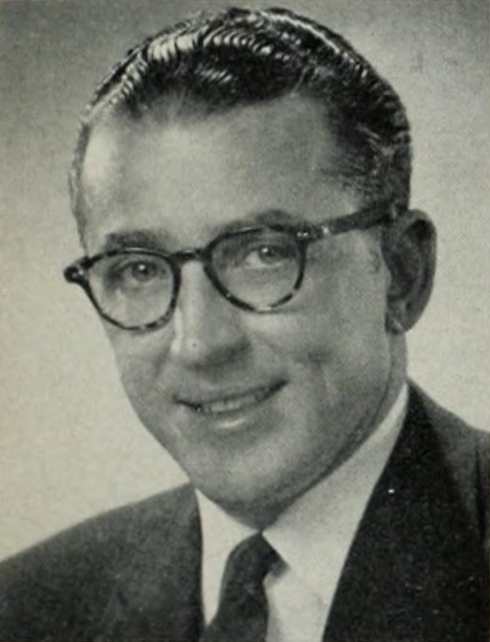

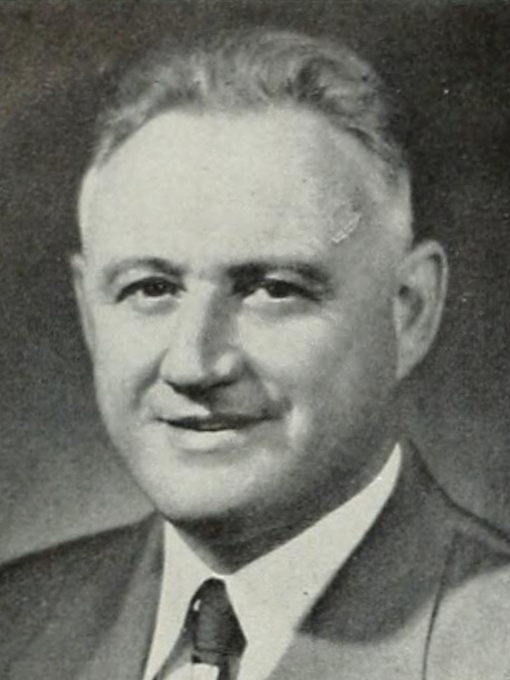
| Candidate | John Shelley | Harold Dobbs | Edward Mancuso |
| Party | Democratic | Republican | Democratic |
| Popular vote | 120,560 | 92,627 | 27,581 |
| Percentage | 50.07% | 38.47% | 11.46% |
Mayor before election
George Christopher
Republican
Elected mayor
John Shelley
Democratic

The 1963 San Francisco mayoral election was held on November 5, 1963.

== Results ==
1963 San Francisco mayoral election
| Candidate | Votes | % |
|---|---|---|
| John Shelley | 120,560 | 50.07% |
| Harold Dobbs | 92,627 | 38.47% |
| Edward Mancuso | 27,581 | 11.46% |
| Total votes: | 240,768 | - |
