= 1946 California lieutenant gubernatorial election =

- November 5, 1946
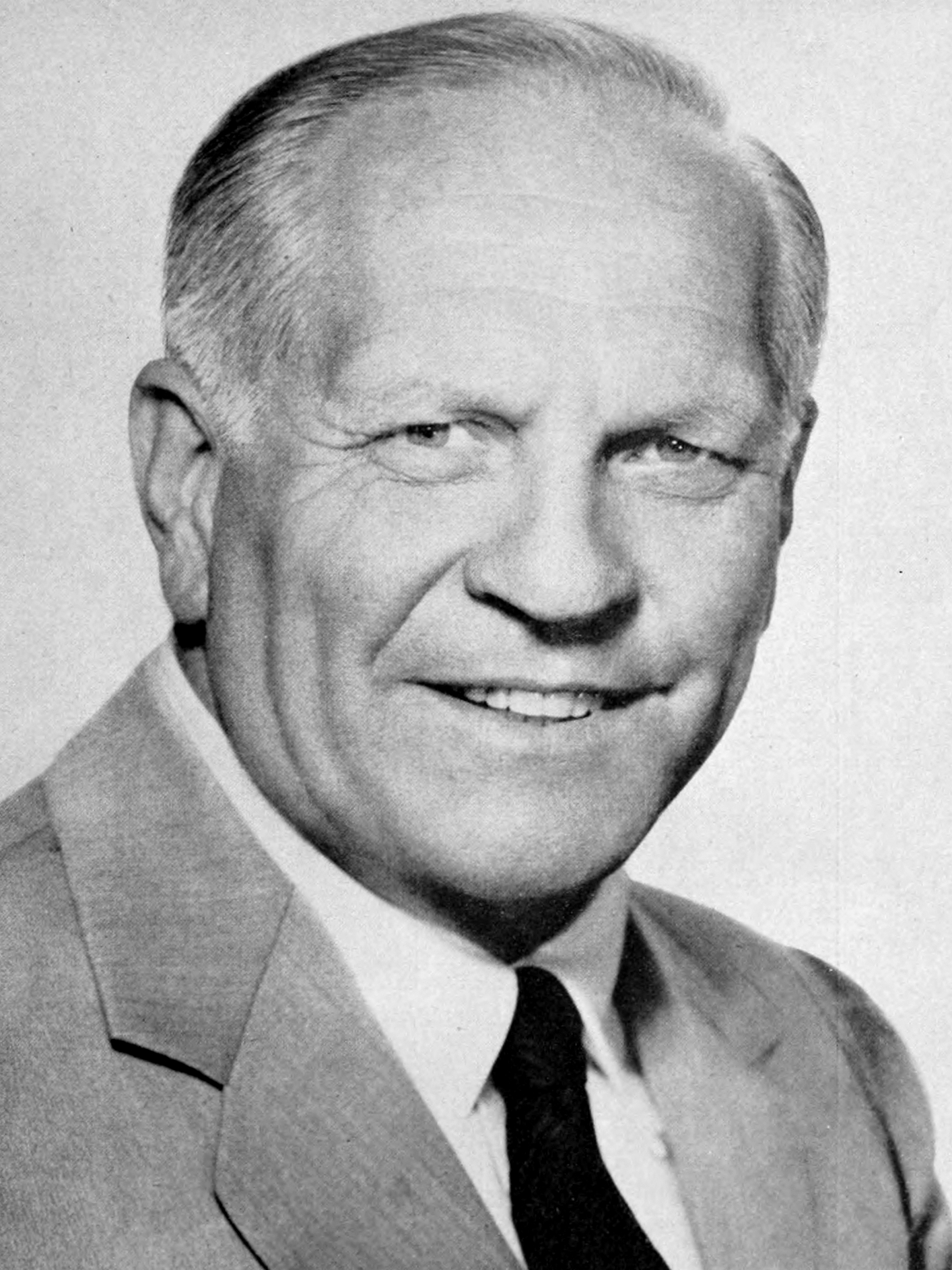

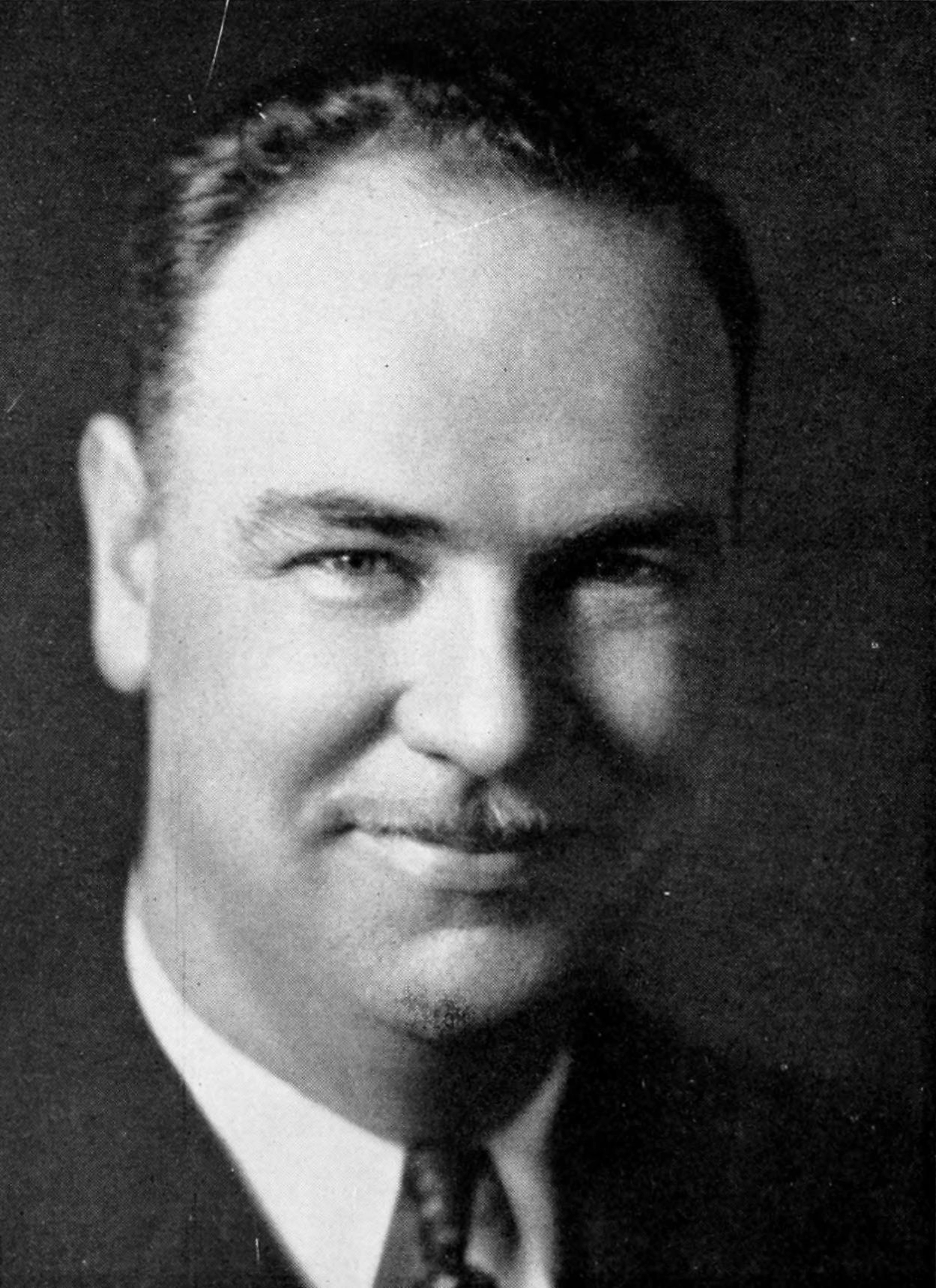
Nominee	Goodwin Knight	John F. Shelley
Party	Republican	Democratic
Popular vote	1,470,496	1,137,232
Percentage	56.38%	43.60%
- County results Knight: 50–60% 60–70% Shelley: 50–60% 60–70%
Lieutenant Governor before election
Frederick F. Houser
Republican
Elected Lieutenant Governor
Goodwin Knight
Republican

The 1946 California lieutenant gubernatorial election was held on November 5, 1946. Republican Superior Court Judge Goodwin Knight safely defeated Democratic State Senator John F. Shelley with 56.39% of the vote.

== General election ==
=== Candidates ===
- Goodwin Knight, Republican
- John F. Shelley, Democratic

=== Results ===
1946 California lieutenant gubernatorial election
Party	Candidate	Votes	%	±%
Republican	Goodwin Knight	1,470,496	56.38%	
Democratic	John F. Shelley	1,137,232	43.60%	
Scattering		323	0.02%	
Majority		2,608,051		
Turnout				
Republican hold		Swing		
