= Thomas J. Cahill =

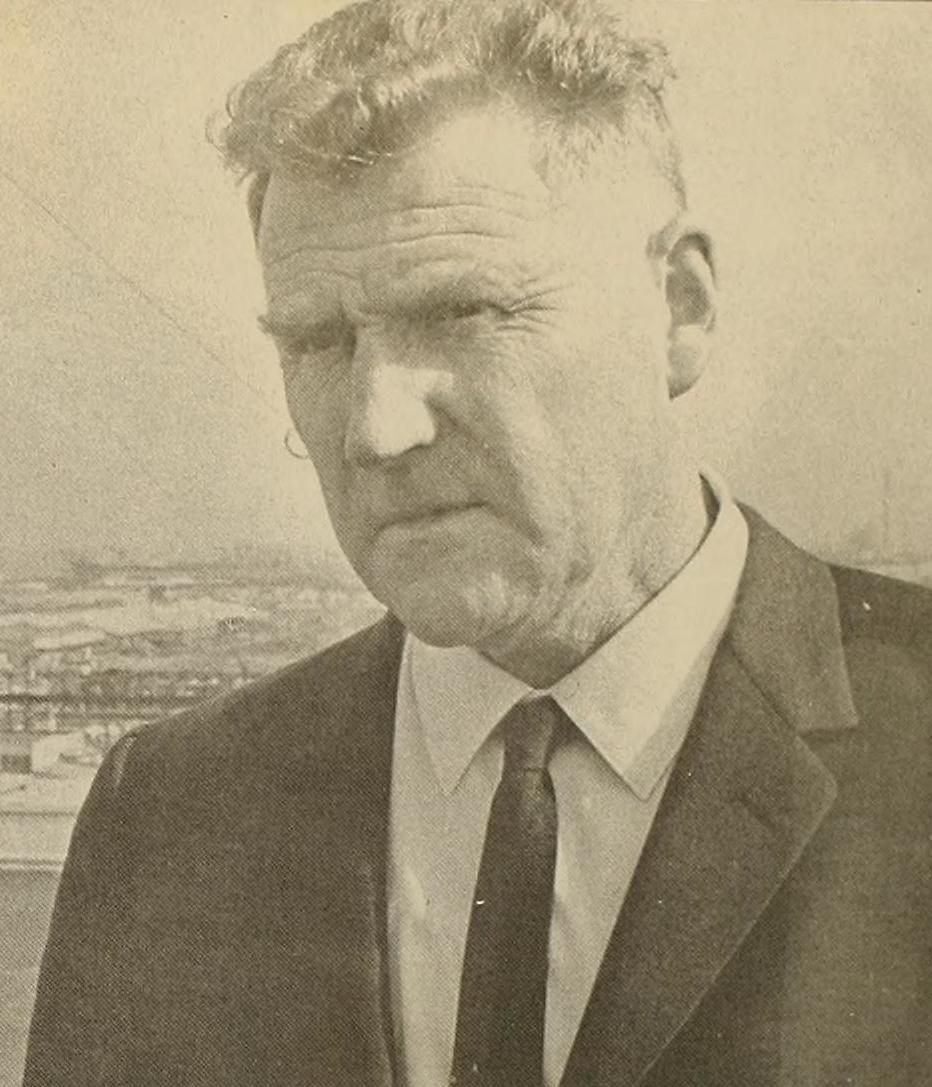
- Cahill, photographed in 1966 during the Hunters Point social uprising
- Born: June 8, 1910; Chicago, Illinois
- Died: October 12, 2002 (aged 92); Clearlake Park, California
- Other name: Tom
- Police career
- Department: San Francisco Police Department
- Service years: 1942–1970
- Rank: Chief: 1958–1970

Thomas J. Cahill (June 8, 1910 – October 12, 2002) was the chief of police of San Francisco, California from 1958 to 1970, the longest tenure as chief of police in San Francisco history. He served under mayors George Christopher, John F. Shelley, and Joseph Alioto.

== Early life ==
Cahill was born June 8, 1910, on Montana Street on the North Side of Chicago. His family returned to County Kilkenny, Ireland, when he was a child, and Cahill returned to San Francisco in 1930.

Cahill was educated at Callan Christian Boys School and studied to become a teacher at Ring College in Dungarvan, Ireland and received the school's Gold Ring Award, granted only to student who could speak, read and write Gaelic. However, after returning to San Francisco at 19, Cahill, a red-headed Irishman, could find little work and drove for the City Ice company. He then needed a good job to help support his new wife, Margaret Smythe (he had married her in San Francisco in 1938). He chose the profession of law enforcement, entered the police department as a recruit, and graduated from the San Francisco police academy in July 1942.

== Law enforcement career ==
His first assignment was as a beat patrolman attached to the Potrero station. In 1943, he was transferred to the Accident Investigation Bureau and, in 1946, he joined the bureau of inspectors. A year later, he was assigned to the Homicide Detail. His partner during his assignment to homicide was Inspector Francis J. Ahern. When Ahern, whose permanent civil service rank was "patrolman," was unexpectedly appointed by Mayor Roger D. Lapham to the position of Chief of the SFPD, over the heads of every captain, lieutenant, and sergeant in the department, Cahill was appointed as Ahern's deputy chief. Cahill was elevated to chief on September 5, 1958, upon Ahern's unexpected death from a heart attack on September 1, at a baseball game. As had been the case with Ahern, Cahill's permanent civil service rank was still only "patrolman." Cahill's first statement after assuming the office of chief was that Ahern's policies would continue in force, which meant "strict departmental discipline, heads up efficiency and a 'closed town.'" Colleagues remarked that Cahill "enjoyed every detail in police problems and the pursuit of justice."

Cahill was hailed at the time of his appointment as SFPD chief by Mayor George Christopher. Cahill, in an interview with local San Francisco media shortly before his death, claimed his relationship with Mayor John F. Shelley was broken by the Summer of Love in 1967: "Jack Shelley, (a Democrat, former liberal congressman and labor leader), did not want to show a heavy hand toward the Hippie & Flower Children element." When hippies flooded Golden Gate Park and the Haight-Ashbury district, Cahill contacted the new California governor, Ronald Reagan, for the California Highway Patrol and the California National Guard to enter San Francisco and sweep the hippies from the city. By law, Reagan needed a request from Shelley. Reagan and Cahill pleaded for his signature, Shelley refused.

On a national level, Cahill was one of the more well-known city police chiefs. He was the only police chief to be selected by Lyndon Johnson to serve on the President's Commission on Law Enforcement, in 1965. He impressed FBI Director J. Edgar Hoover, who called him the best public administrator in the entire US, so much that Cahill was one of the two finalists (along with Clarence M. Kelly) for the FBI Director post. He was the only police chief in the country to be on the acclaimed television program, Meet the Press, and his discernment and articulateness struck everyone, when he appeared as a panelist on February 19, 1967.

Cahill retired from the force on February 4, 1970, after a request from Mayor Joseph Alioto, who later appointed Alfred Nelder as San Francisco Police Chief. Alioto felt Cahill was too "rigid" and "old fashioned" for law enforcement in 1970s San Francisco. After Cahill's retirement, he became chief of security for Pac Bell in San Francisco until July 1, 1975, shortly after he reached the mandatory retirement age. He also won a position on the San Francisco Charter Revision Committee.

== Later life ==
In 1994, San Francisco honored Cahill by renaming the Hall of Justice in San Francisco as the Thomas J. Cahill Hall of Justice.

In 2000, he married 80-year-old Elizabeth Wright, a longtime friend and the widow of a former Fremont police chief, Clinton Wright.

He died of congestive heart failure on October 12, 2002, at 92 in Lake County at Queen of the Valley Hospital in Clearlake Park, California. He was survived by his third wife, Elizabeth (Wright), four children (Thomas, Jr., John, Edmond, and Elizabeth) and many grandchildren.
