= Hunters Point social uprising (1966) =

1966 protests

Hunters Point Social Uprising
- Part of Ghetto riots
- Date: September 27 – October 1, 1966
- Location: Hunters Point, San Francisco
- Caused by: Shooting and death of Matthew 'Peanut' Johnson by San Francisco policeman

Parties
Civilian groups: Rioters primarily from the African American communities	Law enforcement: SFPD; CHP; Military groups: National Guard	Community groups: Youth for Service

Casualties
- Death: 1
- Injuries: 51
- Arrested: 359

The Hunters Point social uprising (also known as the Hunters Point Riot or Rebellion) broke out in the Hunters Point neighborhood of San Francisco on the night of September 27, 1966, after San Francisco Police Department (SFPD) officer Alvin Johnson shot and killed Matthew Johnson, a teenager who was fleeing the scene of a stolen car. The National Guard and California Highway Patrol (CHP) were deployed late that night by Governor Pat Brown, and martial law was imposed until October 1.

== Events ==
Key locations of Hunters Point social uprising. Curfew area shaded in blue.

Although an account of the events that unfolded in Hunters Point in late September 1966 is contained in the report 128 Hours, Arthur Hippler has criticized the report as biased favorably towards police actions, noting it omitted several important details, such as the incident when the police shot into the Bayview Community Center on September 28.

=== Contributing factors ===
Some of the primary contributing factors that have been cited are the poverty, unemployment, and isolation of Hunters Point.

Hunters Point was a food desert and housing in the Hunters Point area, especially the temporary housing erected during World War II to house shipyard workers, was dilapidated. Ruth Williams and Justin Herman called the area "worn-out" and "blighted". They described the "run-down housing with leaking roofs, sagging foundations, rotting plumbing, rodents and vermin" and concluded "no reasonable person believes that such housing should be continued in San Francisco any longer than is absolutely necessary". The surrounding area, also known as "the ridge", was also called "devoid of amenities" for the lack of grocery stores, poor schools, and limited recreation facilities. State law required these temporary buildings be razed by 1970, and to ensure replacement housing could be built, the San Francisco Redevelopment Agency sent a letter to the City Controller recommending the 117 acres (47 ha) area be declared a redevelopment area. On July 30, 1962, the San Francisco Board of Supervisors appropriated US$10,773 (equivalent to $115,000 in 2025) to apply for a federal grant. The two projects that had just gotten started in 1966 to alleviate the blight were known as the Butchertown and Hunters Point Redevelopment Projects.

In March 1966, residents from Bayview/Hunters Point picketed a meeting of the San Francisco Housing Authority to protest eviction policies. A Housing Authority official stated "the problem is one of jobs." Federal funds for job programs were cut in September 1966, triggering an impromptu meeting between the youth of Hunters Point, city officials, and community leaders. Mayor John Shelley sent a representative, who was threatened with physical harm if he returned with more empty promises; the Chamber of Commerce and major unions simply did not even show up to the meeting. Because funds for comparable programs in Los Angeles and Oakland had not been cut, the crowd quickly concluded the threat of rioting was effective in preserving those funds. At the time, it was estimated the national unemployment rate was 3.9 percent, but it was 5 percent in San Francisco, and African-American males in the San Francisco Bay Area were estimated to be unemployed at triple the rate of their Caucasian counterparts.

=== Shooting of Matthew Johnson ===
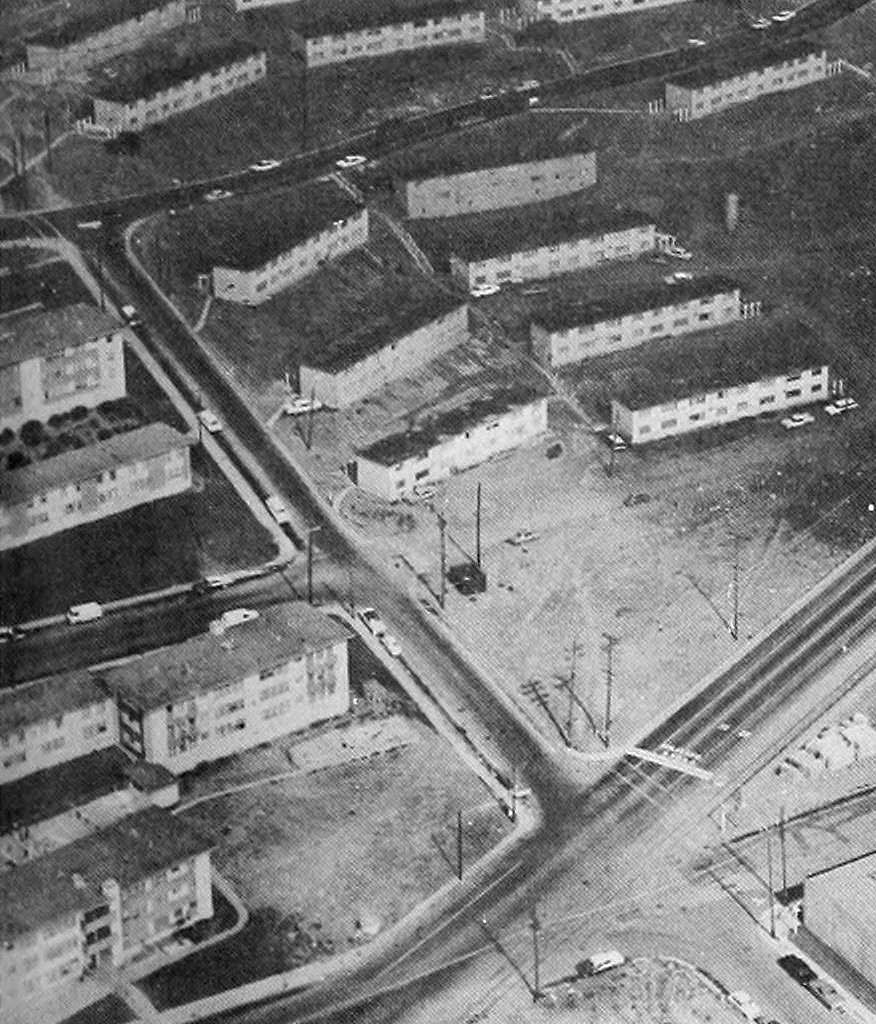
Aerial view of Hunters Point area, facing northeast, where shooting occurred. The intersection where Oakdale Avenue (running east–west) dead-ends into Griffith Street (running north–south) is shown in the center of the photograph, and Navy Road (running east–west) is near the top of the photograph. Temporary "crackerbox" housing for shipyard workers built during World War II can be seen east of Griffith and north of Navy.

On the afternoon of Tuesday, September 27, 1966, SFPD patrolman Alvin Johnson shot and killed Matthew 'Peanut' Johnson (no relation). That day was unusually warm in San Francisco, reaching a daytime high of 87 °F (31 °C); the average of 74 °F (23 °C) was 11° warmer than the 30-year historical average of 63 °F (17 °C).

At 2:30 P.M. local time, Officer Johnson drove near a suspicious 1958 Buick, stopped facing northward at the intersection of Griffith and Oakdale; as he pulled up to the car, two of the three occupants, Matthew 'Peanut' Johnson (16 years old) and Clifton Bacon (15) left the car and fled east into the field near the temporary World War II shipyard worker housing. The third occupant, Darnell Mobley (14) hid near parked cars and was not seen by Officer Johnson. Officer Johnson immediately suspected the boys had stolen the car because they had fled upon his approach, although the car was not reported stolen until hours after the encounter, at 8:25 P.M. that night. According to the owner of the automobile, she had parked the car near Portola Junior High, from where it had been stolen at 11:36 A.M.; Bacon recalled hearing the fourth period lunch bell. The owner did not report the car as stolen until later that night because she had believed her husband had come for the car.

Officer Johnson briefly pursued Bacon and Matthew Johnson on foot, but they outran him and he observed them headed north toward Navy Road and Griffith Street. Officer Johnson returned to his car to chase them, warning them to stop or he would shoot. As he approached Building 15 at the corner of Navy and Griffith, Officer Johnson saw Matthew run out from behind the building and again Officer Johnson yelled at him to stop. Officer Johnson proceeded to drive his patrol car to the east end of Building 15, then exited the car to see Matthew running south, down the hill. According to a televised interview later that night, Officer Johnson again commanded Matthew to stop before he fired three warning shots into the air. Johnson then fired a fourth shot at Matthew. Matthew was approximately 250 feet (76 m) away from the officer at the time of the fourth shot, running up a slight rise in the terrain, and Officer Johnson watched him pitch forward after the shot. Officer Johnson then ran to the scene, expecting to find the teenager paralyzed by fear. Instead, he found Matthew face-down with blood coming from his mouth. As he recounted in his interview, an apparently shaken Johnson asked a passing nurse to help Matthew before leaving the scene; he then ended the interview and was subsequently suspended without pay.

A witness would later contradict Officer Johnson's statement, saying that all shots fired were aimed at Matthew and the interview was carefully scripted to engender maximum sympathy for the police. Recalling the scene fifty years later, Oscar James said "[Officer Johnson] was lying his ass off. And then he walks away like he's getting ready to cry. He wasn't shaken up. It was a normal thing back then." Matthew was shot in the back. A coroner's jury would rule less than a month later on October 20, 1966 that Officer Johnson had committed justifiable homicide. Johnson was immediately restored to the force and his back pay during his suspension was reinstated. Matthew Johnson's family was represented during the inquest by lawyer Johnnie Cochran.

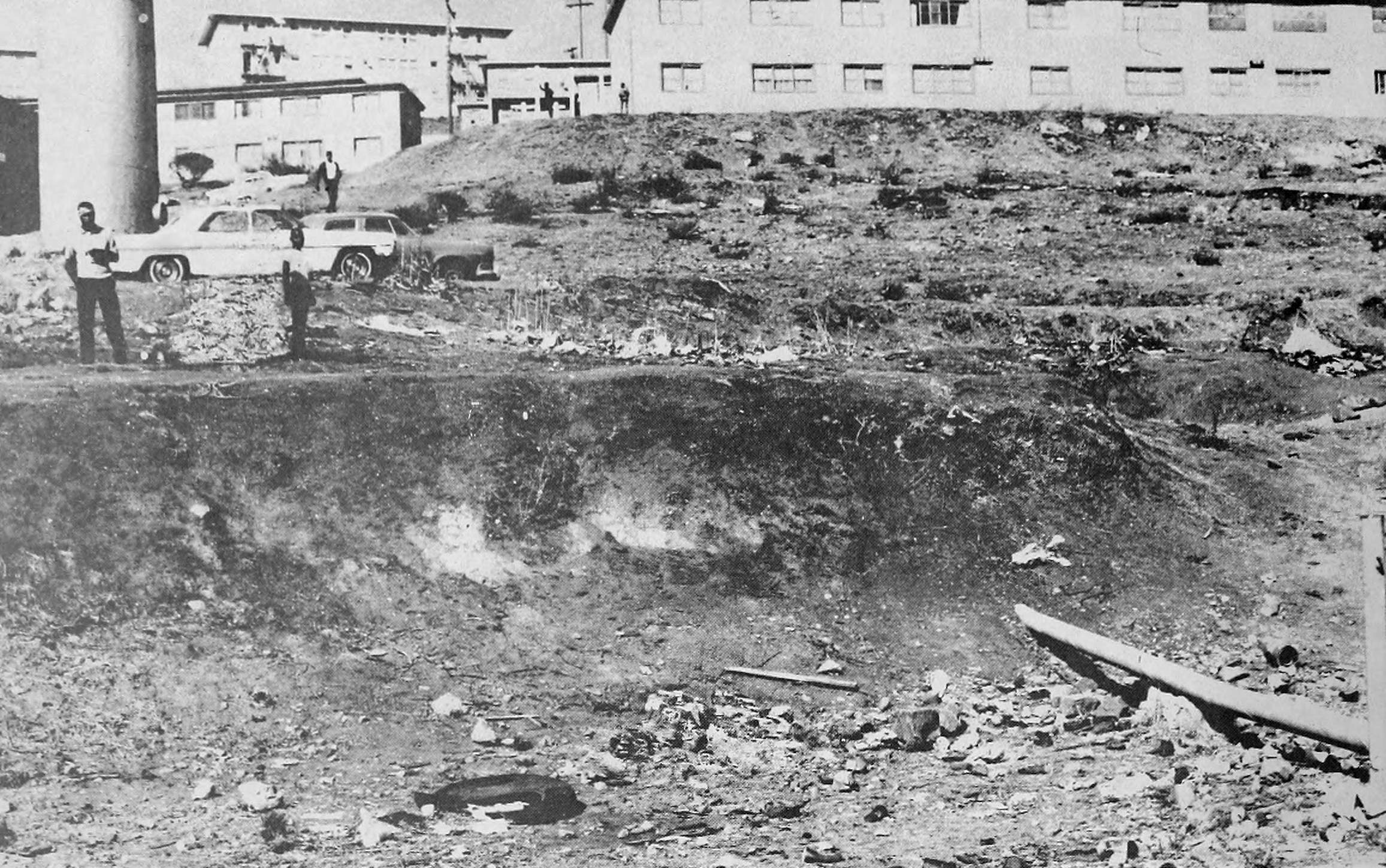
Closer view of the area east of Griffith and south of Navy where Matthew 'Peanut' Johnson was shot in 1966.

The shooting of Matthew Johnson was not the killing of a Negro boy by a white policeman, but the excusable shooting of a suspected criminal by a law enforcement officer who never intended to kill his man. It was no more and no less.

— Staff writer, SFPD Officer's Association, The Notebook, Nov 1966

The first bystanders arrived at the scene from their nearby workplace at 185/187 Navy Road; Gus Davis had heard Officer Johnson calling for help, and Louise Williams, who was the responding nurse, had observed Matthew pitch forward from her office and ran to the scene to assist. Mrs. Williams rendered first aid until she could no longer detect a pulse. The San Francisco Police Department was informed of the shooting at 3:10 P.M., and an ambulance from the Alemany Emergency Hospital responded by 3:14 P.M. A paramedic from the ambulance pronounced Matthew dead shortly after arrival, and the Coroner's office was called at 3:28 P.M. Matthew's body was removed at 3:50 P.M., and the automobile that sparked the shooting was towed to the impound yard at 3:55 P.M.

=== Growing unrest ===
By 4:00 P.M., there were approximately 150 bystanders observing the proceedings, although they dispersed on their own at approximately 4:15. Later that afternoon, a group of approximately 40–60 young adults were observed at the Economic Opportunity Center (headquarters of the local Office of Economic Opportunity, at Third and Palou) loudly discussing plans to storm the Potrero Police Station (then located at Third and 20th), and Captain Harry Nelson, the commanding officer at Potrero, was called to meet with them and address their concerns. After listening to their questions, Nelson stated the shooting was under investigation and no results were yet available, leaving the group at approximately 6:45 P.M.

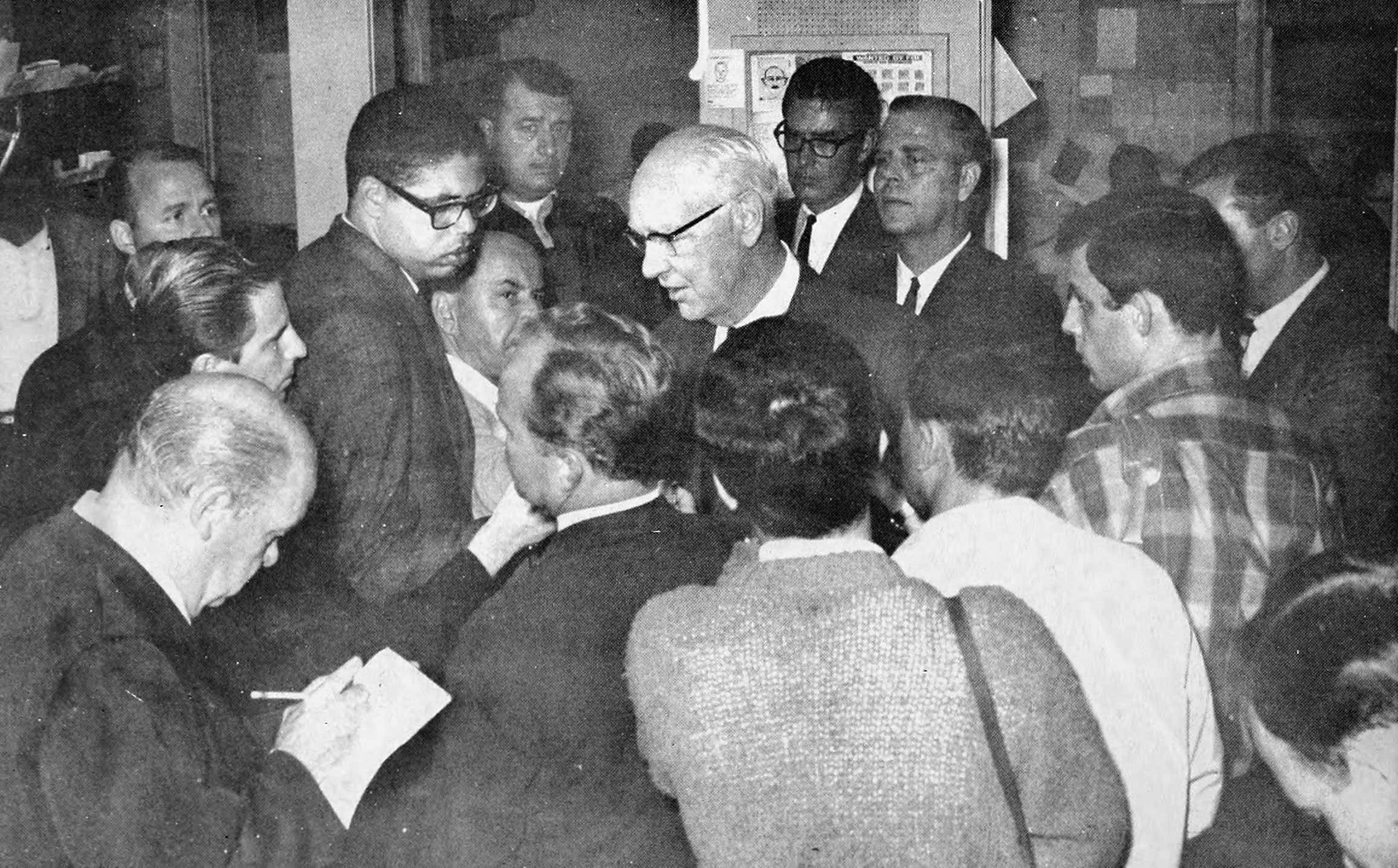
Mayor Shelley meets with the press at Potrero Station

The youths who had met with Nelson spilled out into the streets, smashing displays at the nearby Rexall Drug store and moving north along Third. A riot was declared in progress at 7:35 P.M. Mayor John F. Shelley traveled to Potrero Station to meet with Police Chief Thomas J. Cahill and Supervisor Terry Francois, and they then drove to the Bayview Community Center (an annex built on the South San Francisco Opera House at Third and Newcomb) to address the crowd and plead for peace. A thrown rock narrowly missed Mayor Shelley, and a motorcycle officer was struck in the face with a brick as they arrived at the Community Center. After entering the Community Center, Mayor Shelley informed the crowd that Officer Johnson had been suspended from duty, and the trio returned to Potrero Station at 9:30 P.M. Supervisor Francois, the lone African-American member of the San Francisco Board of Supervisors, had received an especially hostile reaction. Outside the Community Center, he was shouted down when he tried to speak, and also had rocks thrown at him by the angry crowd.

Meanwhile, riot units had been assembled at Potrero Station and were taken to staging areas along Quint to sweep east and disperse crowds towards Third, and other patrols were set up to move car traffic out of the area by blocking Third and redirecting automobiles from Williams to Evans. After the sweep was complete, the riot units reassembled at Third and Oakdale to push the crowds further east. As noted later by Arthur Hippler, the "sweep" followed the contemporary standard practice of the SFPD, which was to herd African-American youths away from the remainder of San Francisco and isolate them in Hunters Point. Wary of further unrest, Chief Cahill ordered additional police officers to report for duty, and the California Army National Guard and CHP were alerted that their assistance may be needed.

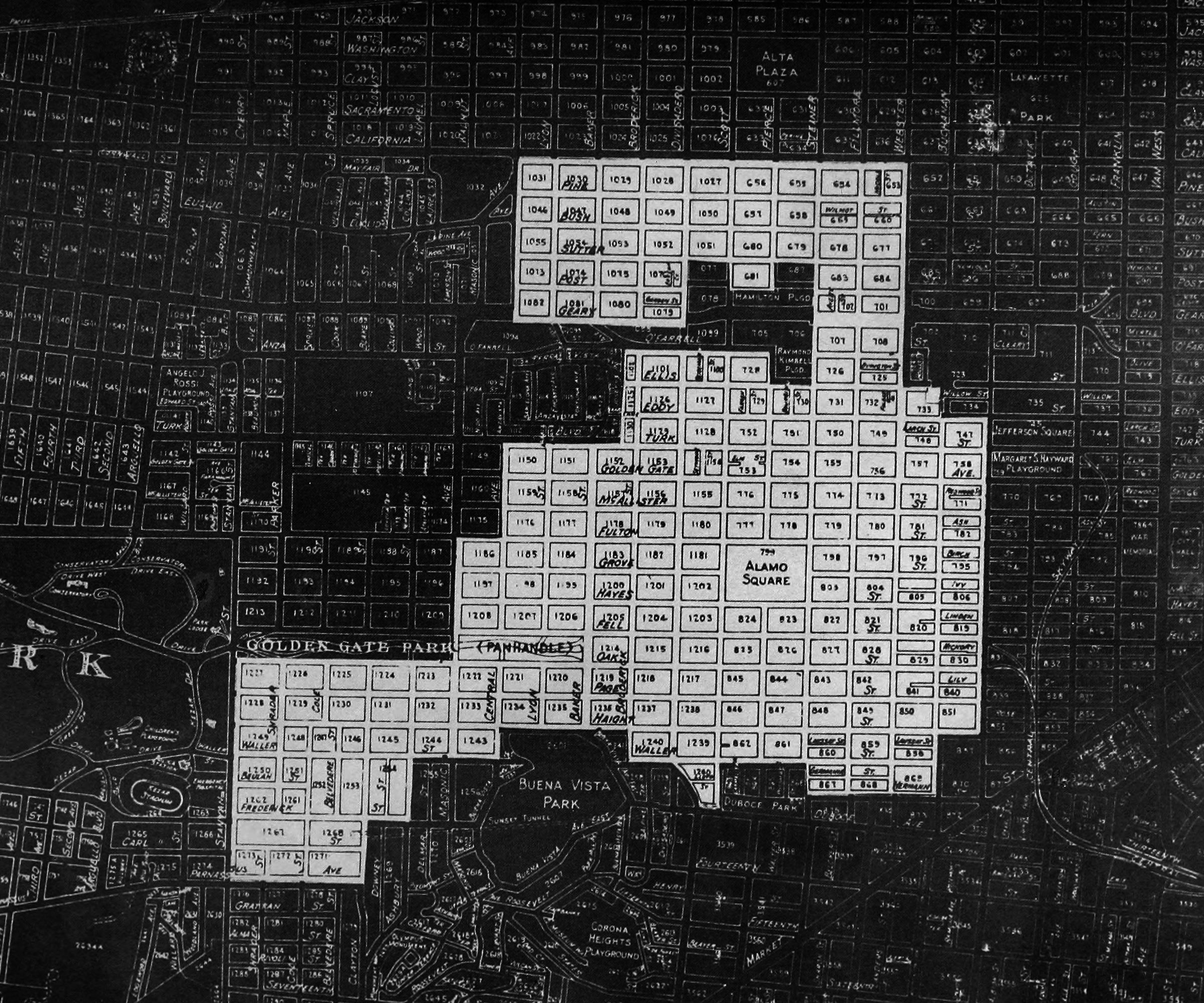
Fillmore

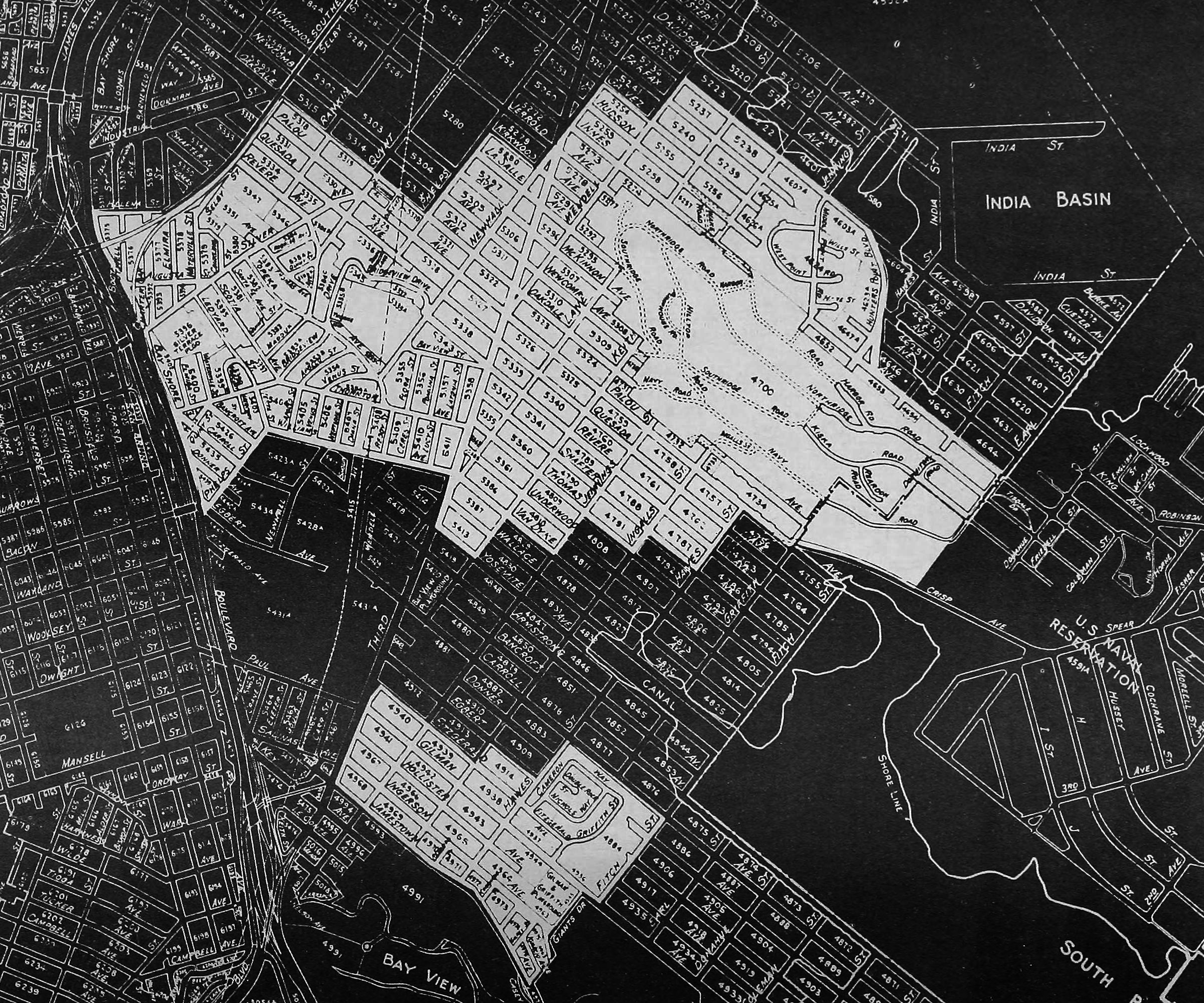
Hunters Point

Maps of curfew areas in the Fillmore and Hunters Point districts, with curfew areas shown in white.

=== Curfew imposed ===
By 11 P.M. the night of September 27, the first reports of smashed windows, looting, and rioting were starting to arrive from SFPD's Northern District, covering the Fillmore District. When the first Highway Patrol officers began to arrive, they were dispatched to assist SFPD in both the Fillmore and Hunters Point areas. Chief Cahill shortly thereafter asked Mayor Shelley to request the assistance of the National Guard, and Mayor Shelley called Governor Brown at 11:39 P.M., asking for 2,000 National Guardsmen. Governor Brown mobilized the requested number at 11:44 P.M. and officially declared a state of emergency. Under the emergency proclamation, a curfew was imposed starting at midnight, to last until 6 A.M. on September 28. It was the largest police mobilization in San Francisco since the end of World War II.

We cannot have revolution in this country and I can assure the people of my State that I will do everything within my power to see that law and order is observed and the rights of person and property are carefully protected. And I'll tell you this – we're going to meet force with force.

— Governor Pat Brown, September 28, 1966 news report

The curfew was drawn around neighborhoods in the Fillmore and Hunters Point districts. The Student Nonviolent Coordinating Committee (SNCC) later called the boundaries "gerrymandered around all areas with a large Negro population", pointing out that one neighborhood surrounding St. Francis Square was excluded from the curfew area generally imposed on the Fillmore because it was "a mostly white middleclass housing project."

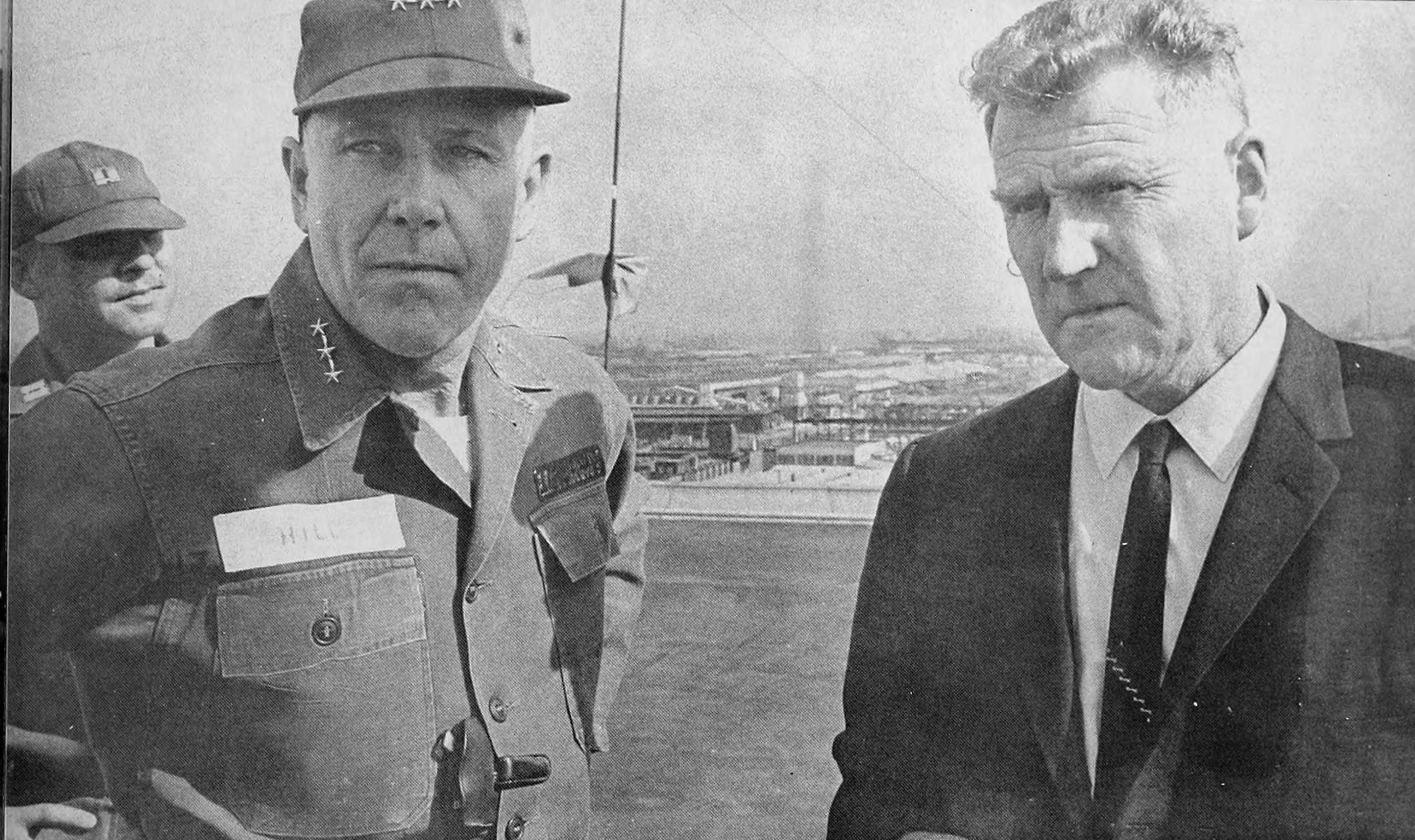
LTG Hill (L) and Chief Cahill (R) meet at the Hall of Justice

Adjutant General Roderic L. Hill of the California National Guard arrived at SFPD headquarters at 1:15 A.M., and Candlestick Park and Kezar Stadium were selected as the staging areas for the National Guard soldiers being mobilized. By 7 A.M. on Wednesday, September 28, control had returned to Potrero Station and the situation was calm until calls began at 9:30 A.M. reporting that crowds were gathering near the Bayview Community Center.

=== Shooting at the Community Center ===
SFPD leadership met with community leaders and agreed to let those leaders attempt to broker peace with the restless crowds. However, Hippler points out the leaders had nothing concrete to offer the angry youths: "... There was nothing that they were empowered to offer the "rioters" to induce them to stop "rioting" that was even half as rewarding as the "rioting" itself. The feelings of manhood and power — especially the power to reverse the roles of underdog and top dog relative to the police, who stand for the white community — could not be compensated for by vague promises." By 11 A.M., the crowd outside the Bayview Community Center was up to nearly 200 people, and the unusually hot day (already 86 °F (30 °C) and rising to a record high of 95 °F (35 °C)) was further inflamed by the crowd throwing rocks and Molotov cocktails. The crowd at the Community Center rapidly grew to nearly 700 strong as unrest broke out across the city. Riots were reported at Mission High School at noon; another riot was reported at Horace Mann Junior High at 1:18 P.M.; and youths were reported throwing rocks and blocking traffic in the Fillmore. The curfew was reimposed on the Fillmore at 12:07 P.M. On Wednesday, there were 1,200 National Guard troops on patrol with police officers, 1,300 more troops standing by, and 2,000 troops in suburban areas. Troops, many of whom had been mobilized to quell the Watts riots of 1965, were issued orders to use lethal force: their commander, Lt. Col. Harland Smith, instructed troops "If you are attacked or fired upon, shoot to kill. Don't fire over anybody's head."

Firefighters, staged to protect properties and businesses, came under attack and National Guard units were dispatched to protect them at 4 P.M. At least one contemporary news report filed by the Associated Press stated that sniping (at law enforcement) was "sporadic and 'almost continuous'". At around the same time, reports of looting, thrown rocks, and gunfire were being heard in the vicinity of Third, and before the police stormed the area, community leaders were again given a short time to convince the crowd to voluntarily disperse. The leaders' efforts were unsuccessful, and at 5:43 P.M., a SFPD officer, Jerry Green, was reported as having been injured (the Associated Press reported he was wounded by a sniper). He was subsequently rushed to the hospital.

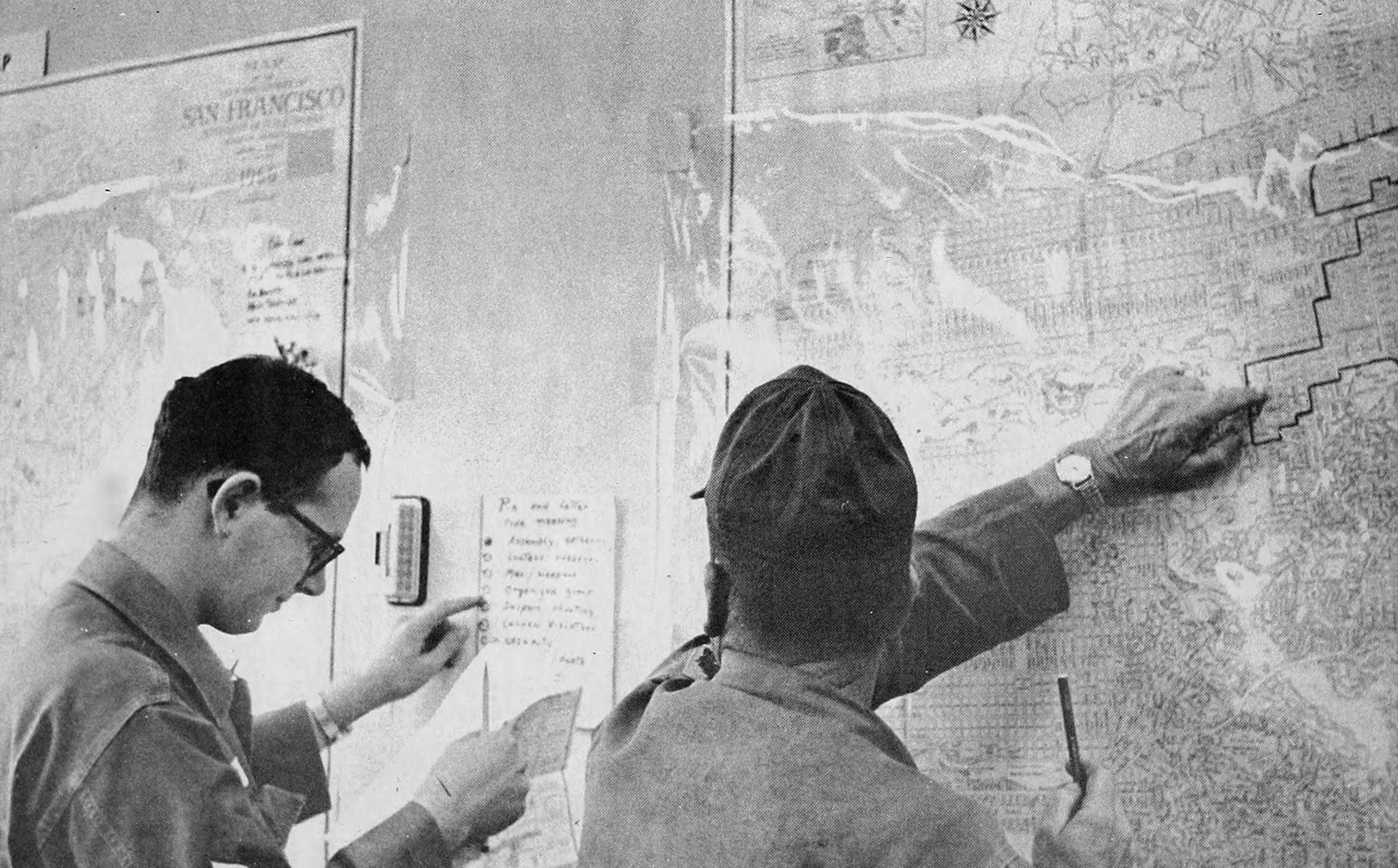
National Guardsmen with a map of San Francisco, partially illustrating the Fillmore curfew area, in the emergency operation center.

Accounts diverge at this point. According to the official 128 Hours report, the officer was "injured by thrown debris", and other personnel near the Bayview Community Center subsequently came under attack, with gunfire and firebombs directed towards them from the Community Center. The police responded by firing two volleys into the air as a warning, but after once again coming under attack, the police shot at the Community Center to suppress resistance. After the gunfire had quelled and officers entered the Community Center, the only evidence that gunfire was directed at the police was in a jacket found behind the right front wheel of a car parked near the Community Center; the jacket had 60 seconal capsules and a single expended .22 cartridge. The Associated Press reported the shooting was in response to a sniper who had taken shelter behind the car, and that sniper had been arrested following the incident.

According to the SNCC, the incident was touched off by a policeman who, after being struck by a rock, exclaimed "I'm hit, I'm hit." His partner radioed the injury into headquarters without explaining what "hit" meant, and assuming that a police officer had been shot, the police responded in force, pouring bullets into the Community Center for seven or eight minutes. At the time, there were 200 children inside the Community Center, and adults inside directed the children to lie down to avoid the bullets. Seven adults outside the Community Center were wounded by the bullets, including Adam Rogers, a member of the community group Youth for Service, which had formed a Peace Patrol group to try to clear the area of protesters at the time. 128 Hours agrees that seven were injured by gunfire, but qualified their injuries by noting "none of which were above the waistline of those persons injured and none of which were of a critical nature." Another news report echoed the minimal injuries, stating three were injured in the legs by shotgun pellets, and almost one dozen had minor cuts.

After the shooting at the Bayview Community Center, National Guard troops staged at Candlestick were deployed to the area, marching north along Third, extending two blocks east and west. Troops were equipped with fixed bayonets and completed the clean-up at 7:15 P.M.; the area remained quiet for the remainder of Wednesday night into Thursday morning. A rumor that rioters may attack businesses along Market Street sent a combined force of SFPD/CHP officers to patrol that area, but no violence was recorded in the area. Meanwhile, in the Fillmore, minor violence had been mostly suppressed by 9 P.M., with sporadic reports of window smashing and looting continuing until 3 A.M. An unidentified Guardsman also stated that Wednesday night was "very uneventful" and the 8 P.M. curfew had been effective in keeping rioters off the streets.

=== Diminishing violence ===
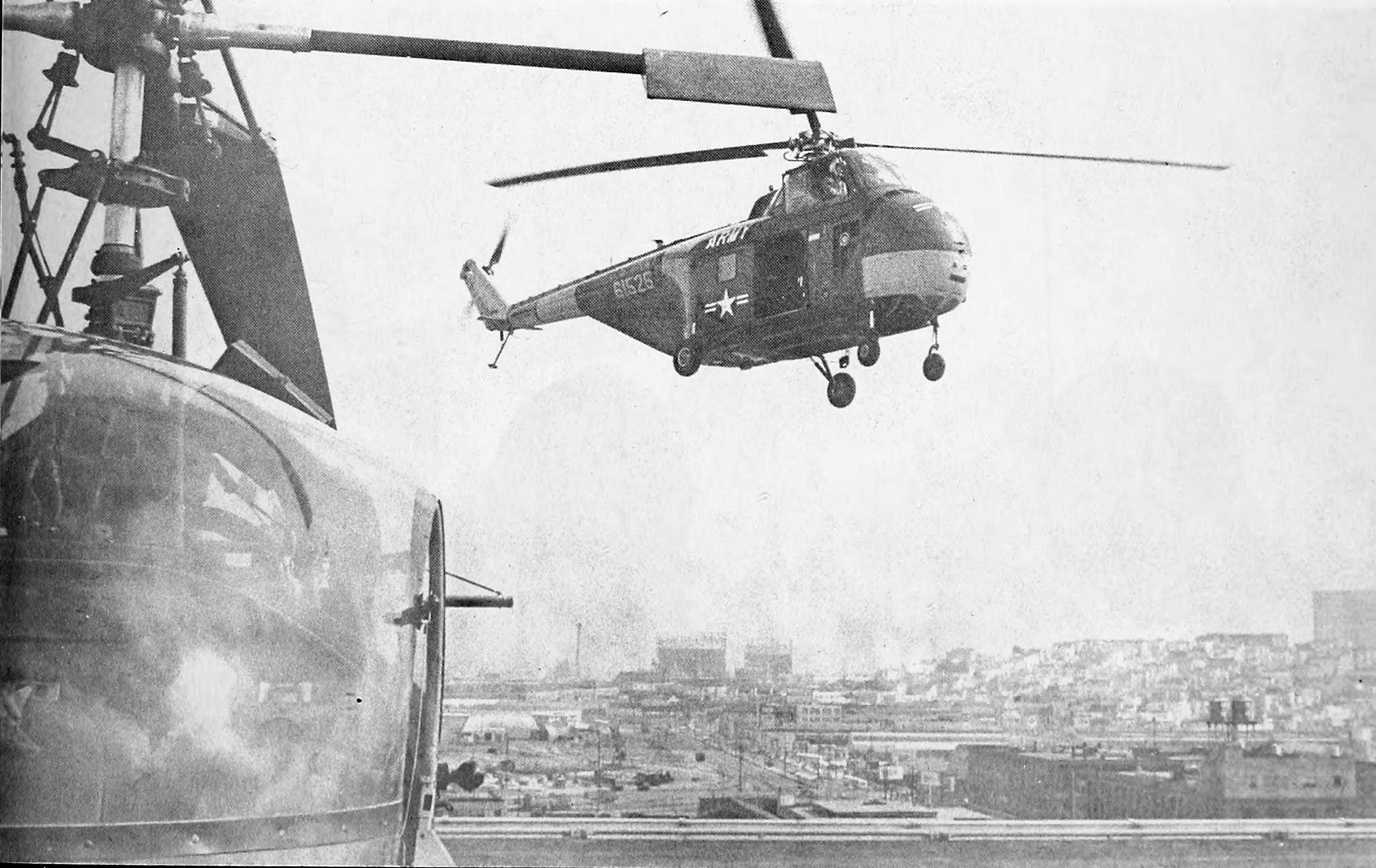
National Guard H-19 helicopters arrive at the Hall of Justice heliport

The curfew remained in effect until 6 A.M. on Thursday, September 29, but Highway Patrol and National Guard units were beginning to withdraw from San Francisco after Governor Brown held a press conference at 9:25 P.M. Violence throughout the daytime hours of Thursday was limited mainly to schools; inter-school athletic events were suspended and Washington High School was dismissed early. Trouble apparently followed the students returning home, as additional violence was reported in Haight-Ashbury, where a bus driver was assaulted.

A Youth Peace Patrol (YPP) was created "under the direction and guidance of the Police Department" to replace the prior Youth for Service patrol. 128 Hours drily noted "the effectiveness of the Youth for Service street monitors was not as effective as had been anticipated." YPP wore SFPD-issued armbands to identify YPP members, and worked their first shift Thursday night after meeting with Chief Cahill to establish rules. Cahill expressed optimism after that meeting. That night, after the curfew went into effect at 8 P.M., no major incidents occurred apart from the arrest of 85 protesters in Haight-Ashbury. The SNCC noted the curfew in Haight-Ashbury was not well-publicized and that police appeared to be targeting exclusively "Negroes, students and hippies" for arrest. The curfew on Friday and Saturday nights (relaxed to start at 11 P.M., lasting until 6 A.M. each night, as announced during a press conference held by Mayor Shelley on September 30, 1966) passed without further major incidents, and the state of emergency was declared over at 11 P.M. on Sunday, October 2.

Mayor Shelley declared his suspicions during that same press conference on September 30 that "outside agitators" had been fomenting the riots, stating his contacts amongst the Hunters Point youth leaders had identified 17 young men who had entered the area from southern California and the East Bay.

== Aftermath ==
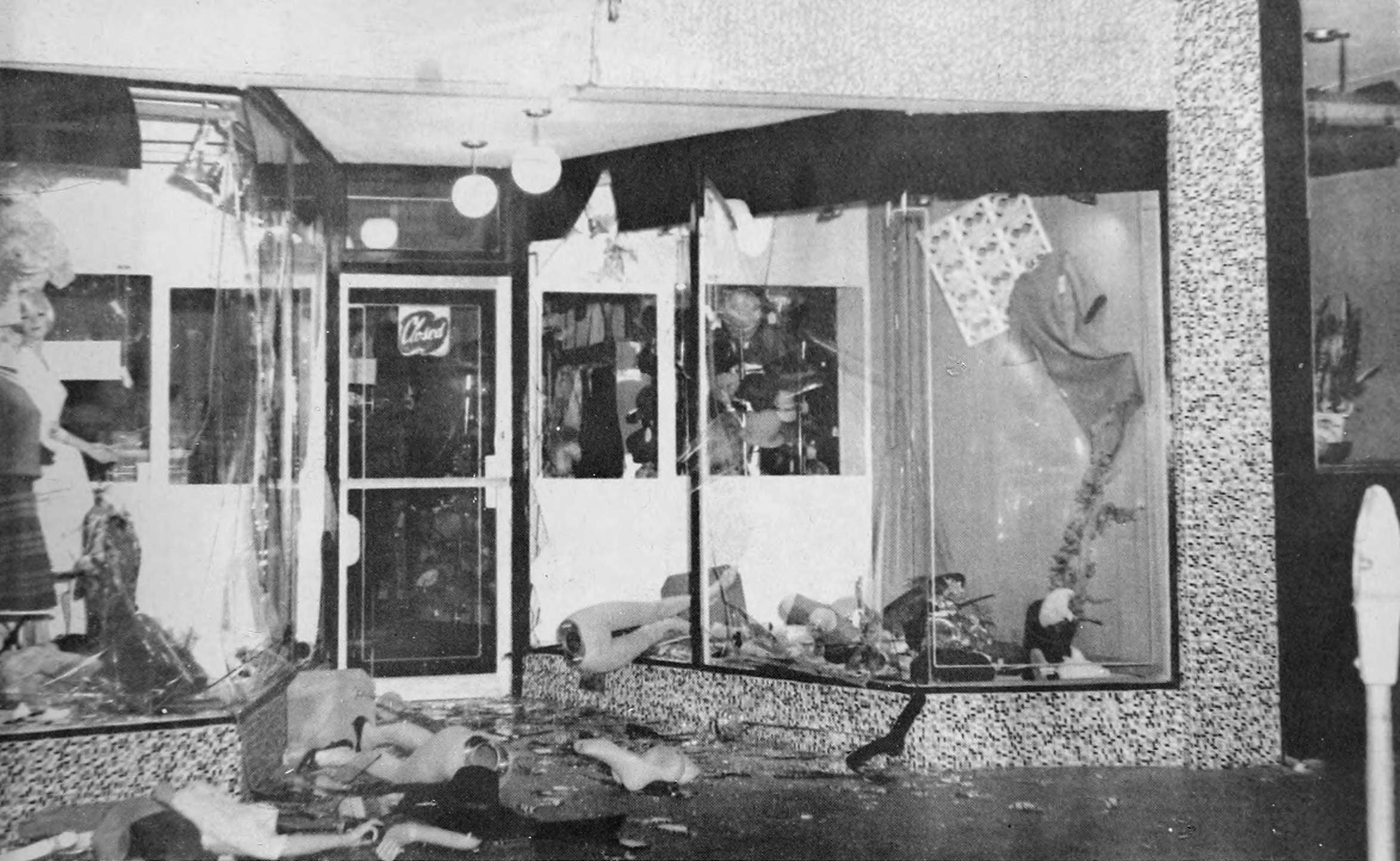
Smashed displays and scattered mannequins

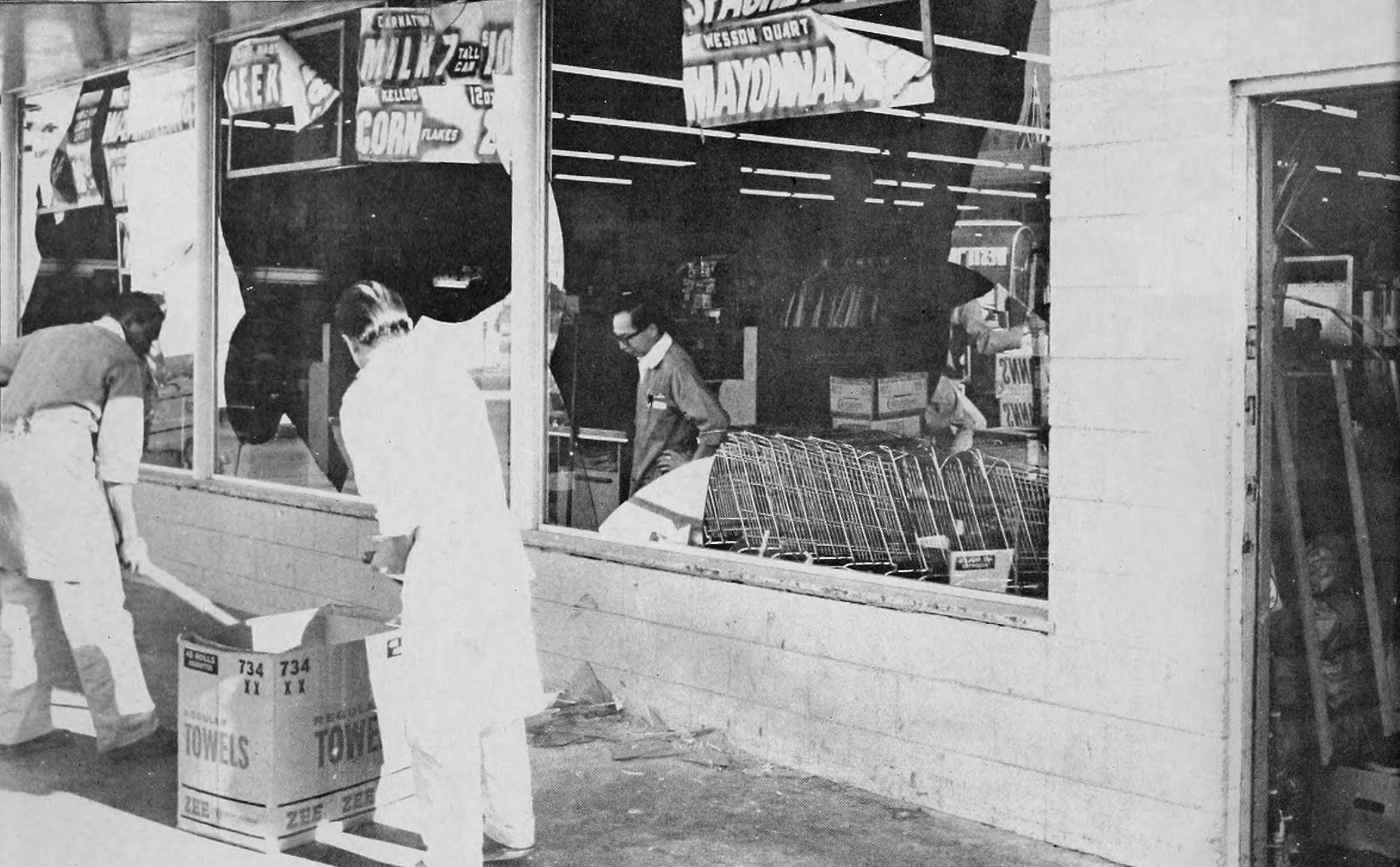
Cleaning up broken glass

Typical damage following "riot" activity.

During the 128 hours that followed the killing of Matthew Johnson, 359 were arrested (many for curfew violations) and 51 were injured, including 6 police officers, 2 firefighters, and 1 municipal bus driver. No additional people were killed, and property damage was estimated at less than $100,000. According to the official report 128 Hours, 457 were arrested and 160 were injured (58 police officers, 27 firefighters, 5 other city employees, and 2 from CHP; 69 civilians, of whom 10 reported gunshot wounds). That report's detailed assessment of damages counted US$45,063 (equivalent to $447,000 in 2025) in property damage and US$90,824 (equivalent to $901,000 in 2025) in inventory losses.

All of these trademarks of violence are but symptoms of a social tragedy that is occurring not only in San Francisco, but in all major cities across our land. The tragedy is the fact that a substantial group of American citizens here in San Francisco and elsewhere have not yet received all the precious opportunities and rights they deserve according to the sacred guarantees of our democracy. Specifically, members of our community who are Negroes are the victims of an almost unendurable frustration. Some are consumed with almost uncontainable fury because they do not have the same economic and social opportunities that are taken for granted by their fellow citizens ... The time has come to do something about the things that caused this agony among us.

— John F. Shelley, Mayor of San Francisco, Ebony Photo-Editorial, December 1966

A program to hire the unemployed drew immediate praise from Dick Gregory days after the state of emergency was over. Cyril Magnin, head of the San Francisco Chamber of Commerce, announced plans to hire "2,000 colored youths", modeling the plan on the recommendations made after the Watts riots. Rep. Phillip Burton announced plans to hire 1,000 temporary workers at the post office for the holiday season, and the Department of Health, Education and Welfare announced plans to start a request for 10,000 health aides. However, by June 1967, only 19 of the promised 2,000 jobs had been posted to the Youth Opportunity Center. In November 1968, a survey of households in Hunters Point indicated the unemployment rate persisted at approximately 15% of 16,000 eligible workers; 80% of those eligible workers were African-American.

Prior to the uprising, San Francisco had begun in 1965 to plan the redevelopment of 126 acres (51 ha) in the Butchertown meatpacking district adjacent to the Hunters Point projects. After the riots, the San Francisco Chamber of Commerce, Hunters Point community leaders, and the San Francisco Redevelopment Agency applied for funds to identify potential business and employment opportunities. The Butchertown Redevelopment Project (subsequently renamed the India Basin Redevelopment Project) was approved in 1969.

Life magazine noted the riot became an issue during the 1966 gubernatorial race between Pat Brown and Ronald Reagan. Reagan accused Brown of not learning "from the experience of Watts and [doing] nothing to forestall future disturbances in possible trouble spots." Brown retorted the issue "is far too serious to engage in a quarrel with that actor", disparaging Reagan's professional qualifications. Life defended Brown's actions and closed the article with a quip from Brown's mother, who he recounted had instructed him to declare "the shooting of that Negro boy was absolutely inexcusable", which he declined.

The Kerner Commission released its report on February 29, 1968 detailing the causes for the race riots of 1967, many of which echoed the underlying reasons for the Hunters Point social uprising:

In June 1968, Edward S. Montgomery, an investigative reporter for the San Francisco Examiner, testified before the House Committee on Un-American Activities that "agitational activities were conducted prior to the riots" by several organizations, which he named as the Direct Action Group, the Ad Hoc Committee To End Discrimination, the Progressive Labor Party, the W.E.B. Du Bois Clubs of America, the Communist Party USA, and the Anarchist League.

=== Johnson, Johnson, and Johnson ===
President Lyndon Johnson assigned Joseph A. Califano, W. Willard Wirtz, and Sargent Shriver to work on sending federal funds to address what Mayor Shelley called "the critical unemployment situation" among African-Americans in San Francisco.

1,000 mourners attended the funeral of Matthew 'Peanut' Johnson at Evergreen Baptist Church on Monday, October 3.

Patrolman Alvin Johnson retired on March 2, 1971, with 27 years of combined service with SFPD and the City Prison.

== Legacy ==
The Hunters Point Social Uprising was one of the subjects covered in Our Part of Town, a 1994 production at the Bayview Opera House based on oral histories compiled by Heidi Hardin.
