= John F. Shelley =

35th Mayor of San Francisco from 1964 to 1968

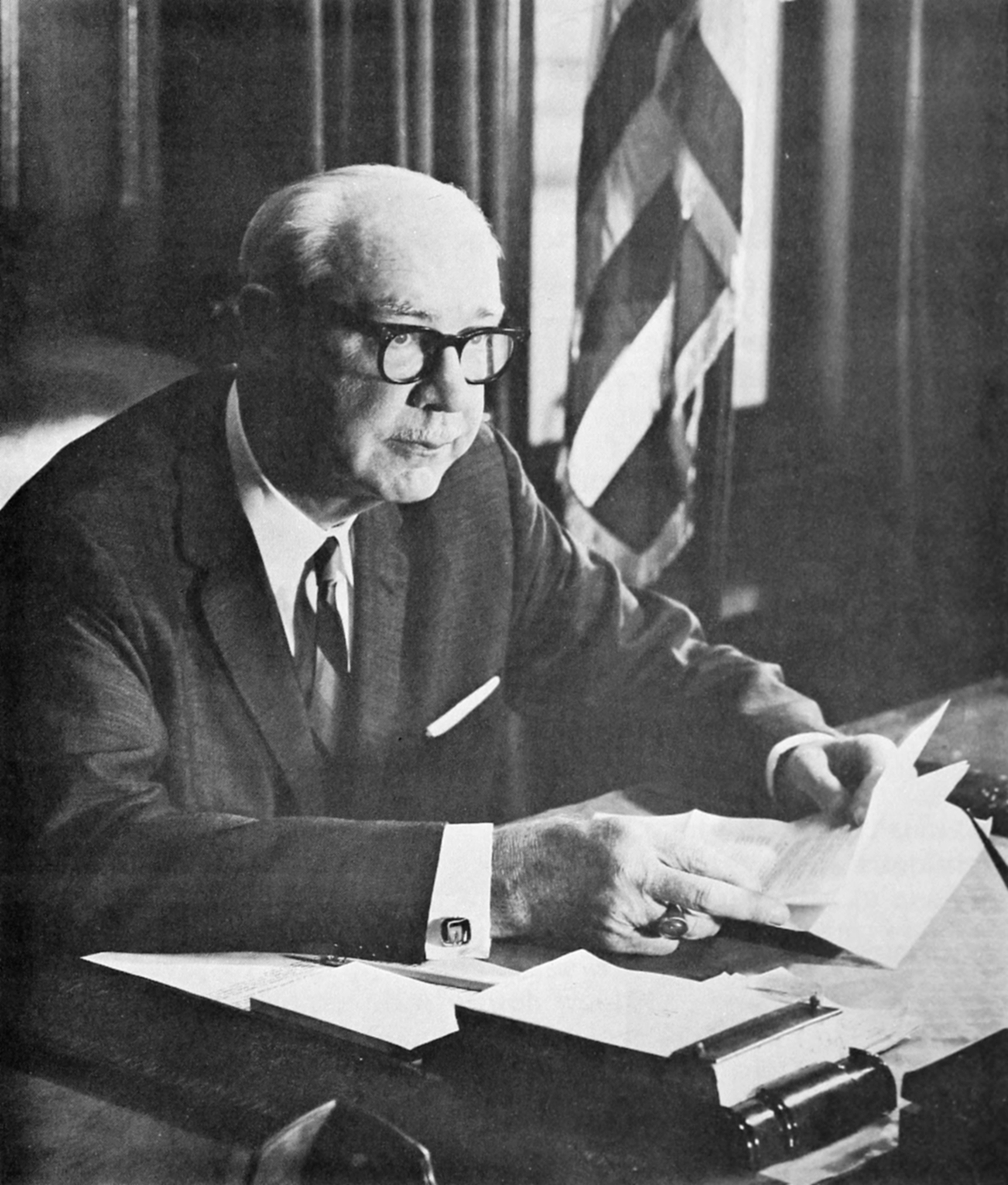
- Shelley c. 1965

35th Mayor of San Francisco
- In office January 8, 1964 – January 8, 1968
- Preceded by: George Christopher
- Succeeded by: Joseph Alioto

Member of the U.S. House of Representatives from California's 5th district
- In office November 8, 1949 – January 7, 1964
- Preceded by: Richard J. Welch
- Succeeded by: Phillip Burton

President of the California Labor Federation
- In office August 7, 1947 – October 12, 1950
- Preceded by: Charles W. Real
- Succeeded by: Thomas L. Pitts

Member of the California Senate from the 14th district
- In office January 2, 1939 – January 6, 1947
- Preceded by: Walter McGovern
- Succeeded by: Gerald J. O'Gara

Personal details
- Born: John Francis Shelley; September 3, 1905 San Francisco, California, U.S.
- Died: September 1, 1974 (aged 68) San Francisco, California, U.S.
- Party: Democratic
- Spouse: Genevieve Giles
- Children: Kevin; Joan-Marie
- Education: University of San Francisco

Military service
- Allegiance: United States
- Branch/service: United States Coast Guard
- Battles/wars: World War II

John Francis Shelley (September 3, 1905 – September 1, 1974) was an American politician who served as the 35th mayor of San Francisco from 1964 to 1968, the first Democrat elected to the office in 50 years, and the first in an unbroken line of Democratic mayors that lasts to the present (as of 2025). His tenure in the United States House of Representatives, immediately prior to his mayoralty (1949-1964), also broke a long streak of Republican House members (44 years) and began a streak of Democratic representatives from San Francisco (and, coincidentally, the 5th district) that continues to the present (as of 2025).

== Early life, family and education ==
John Francis Shelley was born in San Francisco on September 3, 1905, the oldest of nine children of Dennis Shelley and Mary Casey Shelley. His father was an immigrant from County Cork, Ireland (then part of the United Kingdom), who became a longshoreman in California. He grew up in the Mission District of San Francisco, then "a tough working-class district," where he "acquired a deep-seated belief that 'working it out instead of fighting it out' was the best policy when disagreement was encountered." He attended Mission High School, where in 1923 he was elected student body president. He studied law and played varsity football at the University of San Francisco while working as a bakery driver, earning his law degree in 1932.

== Early union activities ==
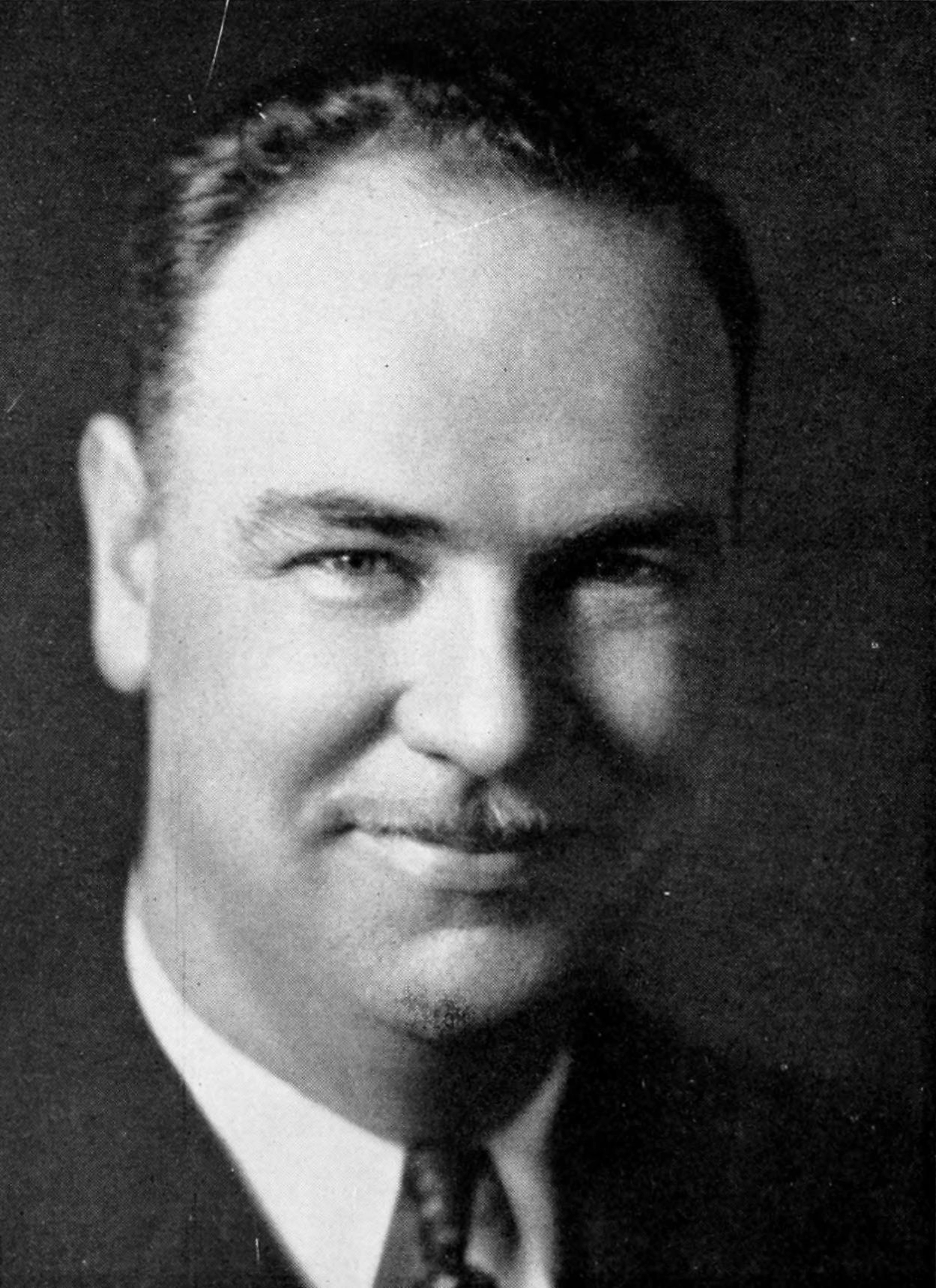
Shelley c. 1940

After graduation (receiving his law degree in 1932), Shelley became a business agent for the Bakery Wagon Drivers Union. In 1936 he became an AFL official, defeating an incumbent to become vice-president of the San Francisco Labor Council. He was the council's representative to the Pacific coast's first industrial development conference aimed at girls and hosted by several Northern California YWCAs.

Shelley was elected president of the council in 1937. Shortly into his term, the council began organizing state agricultural and cannery workers under the AFL. Shelley was one of the leaders of the California People's Legislative Conference, a group supporting Washington state's minimum wage, while the Supreme Court was entertaining a constitutional challenge against it in West Coast Hotel Co. v. Parrish.

Beginning in the spring of 1937, Shelley faced two crises: growing labor unrest, and attempts by the Committee for Industrial Organization to replace the AFL as bargaining agent for local unionized shops. Strikes and threats of strikes in Northern California followed first the sit-down strike against General Motors and then strikes at several Works Progress Administration projects in the San Francisco Bay Area. Shelley was active in settling several labor disputes, but despite his efforts 3,500 members of six unions went on strike against 16 leading San Francisco Hotels on May 1, 1937. On the same day, the AFL purged the CIO from the Alameda Labor Council owing to a jurisdictional dispute between the AFL Longshoremen and the CIO Teamsters, a move that the San Francisco Labor Council strongly disapproved of.

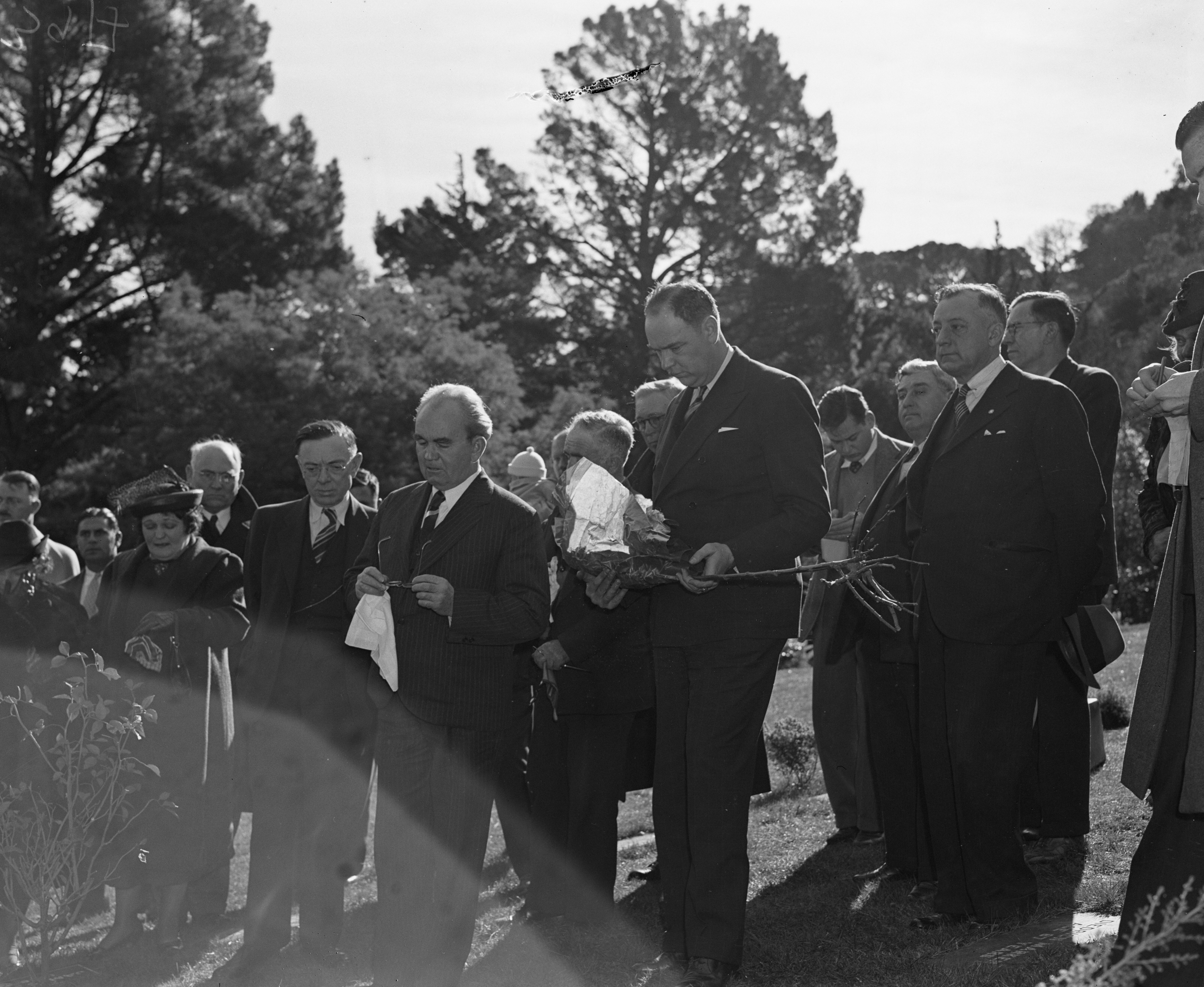
Thomas Mooney (center left, holding glasses and handkerchief) at his mother's grave, January 8, 1939. Shelley is to the right of Mooney.

In the midst of the hotel strike, 2100 elevators and janitors in buildings citywide voted to strike, but the work-stoppage was postponed by the international to continue negotiating. Other unions voted to strike, including the milk wagon drivers. At the California AFL's "loyalty" convention in September, Shelley and George G. Kidwell (his former superior in the Bakery Wagon Drivers' Union) were beaten up for introducing a resolution calling for the merger of the AFL and CIO. A decade later, Shelley was elected president of the organization, serving until 1950.

== World War II and Congress ==
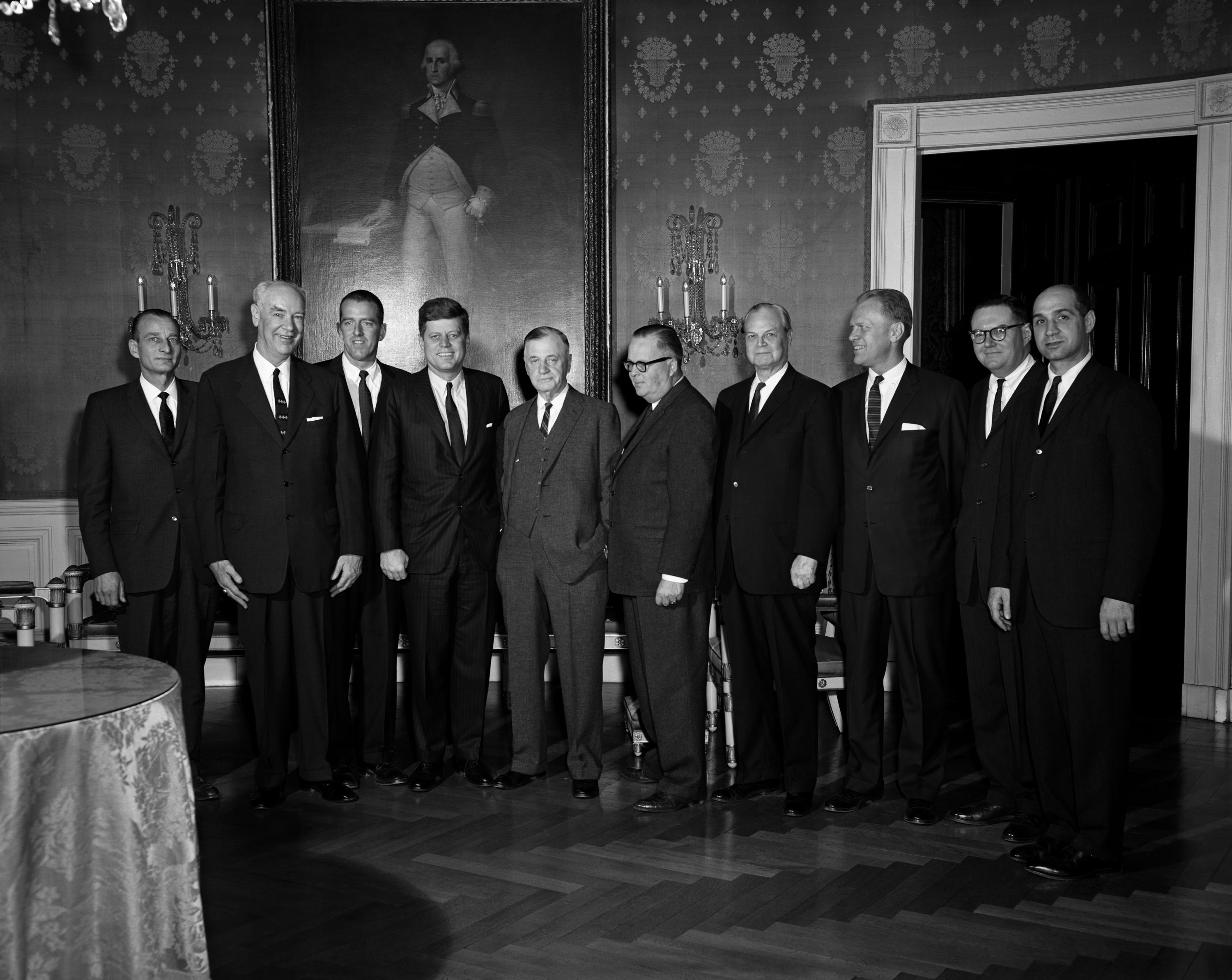
President John F. Kennedy at Congressional Coffee Hour, March 21, 1961. (L-R): John Lesinski Jr., John F. Shelley, Peter A. Garland, John F. Kennedy, Michael J. Kirwan, Robert J. Corbett, James B. Frazier Jr., Gerald R. Ford Jr., Abner W. Sibal, Emilio Q. Daddario.

Shelley served in the United States Coast Guard during World War II and was a member of the California State Senate from 1939 to 1947. During his tenure, he fought unsuccessfully to confirm the nomination of labor leader Germain Bulcke as a member of the San Francisco Harbor Commission. Shelley ran for Lieutenant Governor in 1946, but was defeated by Goodwin Knight. Shelley would then make his mark as a leader of the California delegation to the 1948 Democratic National Convention, when he helped marshal his state's votes to support a strong civil rights plank. Shelley entered the United States House of Representatives in 1949 and served until 1964, when he stepped down to be inaugurated Mayor of San Francisco after winning the November, 1963 election by nearly a 12-point margin against his nearest opponent, Harold Dobbs (50-38.5%).

== Relations with the FBI ==
Prior to his election as a U.S. congressman, Shelley was included in the FBI's Custodial Detention (DETCOM) files. The FBI's "DETCOM Program" "was concerned with the individuals 'to be given priority arrest in the event of ... an emergency.'" Priority under the Detcom program was given to "all top functionaries, all key figures, all individuals tabbed under the Comsab program", and "any other individual who, though he does not fall in the above groups, should be given priority arrest because of some peculiar circumstances".

A memo by Warren Olney III alerted FBI Director J. Edgar Hoover to the fact that Shelley was recently elected and remained targeted, along with fellow San Francisco congressman Franck R. Havenner, to be arrested by the FBI as a security risk in case of a Soviet attack. A July 23, 1962 FBI search slip on Shelley is check-marked for "subversive references only" and remains heavily redacted with numerous unreleased documents.

== Mayor of San Francisco ==
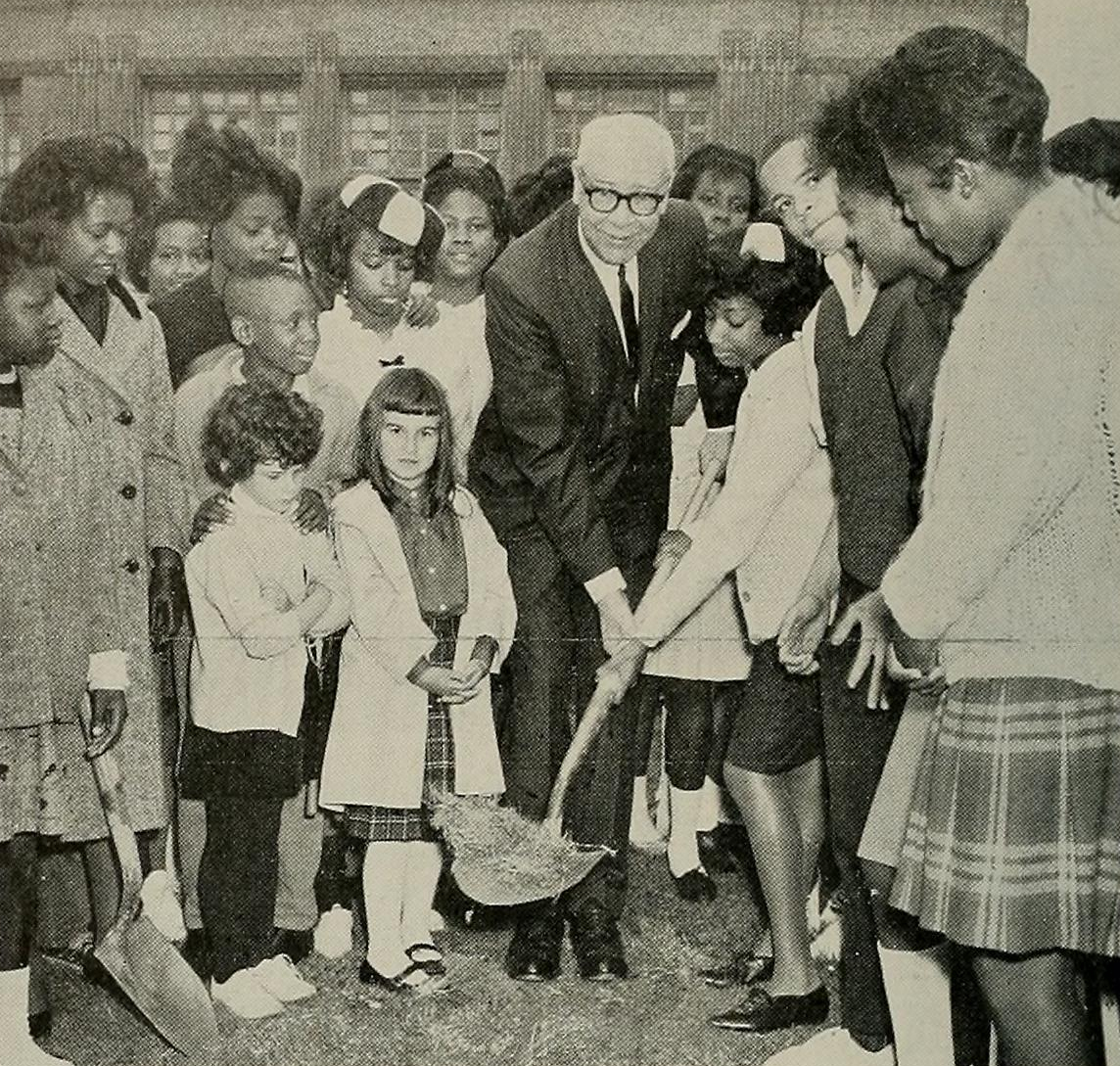
Shelley, surrounded by students, breaks ground on a new library at Benjamin Franklin Middle School, May 19, 1965

Shelley's term as mayor was filled with challenges, including strikes over discriminatory hiring practices against African-Americans at the Palace Hotel, a public nurse strike in 1966, and a threatened San Francisco Symphony Orchestra strike in 1967. Shelley was mayor during the Summer of Love, a time of radicalism in the Haight-Ashbury and turmoil throughout the city, including Black rage toward the "auto row" on Van Ness Avenue. He was faced with riots in Bayview-Hunters Point on September 27, 1966, after a white police officer fatally shot a black youth accused of auto theft. Shelley declared a state of emergency in the city for six days. After the riots ended, Shelley took several public steps to improve relations between city government and the African-American community. He appointed the city and county's first African-American supervisor, Terry Francois.

Shelley took an aggressive stance against several prominent anti-development mobilizations during his tenure, including movements in opposition to development at the Yerba Buena Gardens and in the Western Addition. Shelley bowed out of running for a second term in office; his stated reasons were health-related, but it was thought that prominent political forces in the city's establishment wanted a more stringently pro-development mayor in office.

== Family ==
Shelley's son, Kevin Shelley, was a member of the San Francisco Board of Supervisors from 1990 to 1996, a member of the California State Assembly from 1997 to 2003 and served as California Secretary of State from 2003 to 2005. Shelley's daughter, Joan-Marie Shelley, was a French teacher for 30 years at Abraham Lincoln High School and Lowell High School in San Francisco Unified School District and carried on the family tradition of labor union leadership, serving as vice-president (1978–1984) and president (1984–1989) of the San Francisco Federation of Teachers and as the founding president (1989–1997) of the United Educators of San Francisco, a merger of the local American Federation of Teachers and local National Education Association unions.

== Electoral history ==
Democrat John F. Shelley won the special election to replace Republican Richard J. Welch, who died in office. Data for this special election is not available.

1950 United States House of Representatives elections in California
Party	Candidate	Votes	%
Democratic	John F. Shelley (Incumbent)	117,888	100.0
Turnout			
Democratic hold			

1952 United States House of Representatives elections in California
Party	Candidate	Votes	%
Democratic	John F. Shelley (Incumbent)	107,542	100.0
Turnout			
Democratic hold			

1954 United States House of Representatives elections in California
Party	Candidate	Votes	%
Democratic	John F. Shelley (Incumbent)	86,428	100.0
Turnout			
Democratic hold			

1956 United States House of Representatives elections in California
Party	Candidate	Votes	%
Democratic	John F. Shelley (Incumbent)	104,358	100.0
Turnout			
Democratic hold			

1958 United States House of Representatives elections in California
Party	Candidate	Votes	%
Democratic	John F. Shelley (Incumbent)	99,171	100.0
Turnout			
Democratic hold			

1960 United States House of Representatives elections in California
Party	Candidate	Votes	%
Democratic	John F. Shelley (Incumbent)	104,507	83.7
Republican	Nick Verreos	20,305	16.3
Total votes		124,812	100.0
Turnout			
Democratic hold			

1962 United States House of Representatives elections in California
Party	Candidate	Votes	%
Democratic	John F. Shelley (Incumbent)	64,493	80.4
Republican	Roland S. Charles	15,670	19.6
Total votes		80,163	100.0
Turnout			
Democratic hold			

1963 San Francisco mayoral election
Candidate	Votes	%
John Shelley	120,560	50.07%
Harold Dobbs	92,627	38.47%
Edward Mancuso	27,581	11.46%
Total votes:	240,768	-

U.S. House of Representatives
Preceded by Richard J. Welch	United States Representative for the 5th Congressional District of California; 1949–1964	Succeeded by Phillip Burton
Political offices
Preceded by George Christopher	Mayor of San Francisco; 1964–1968	Succeeded by Joseph Alioto
