= USS Harcourt (IX-225) =

Liberty ship of World War II

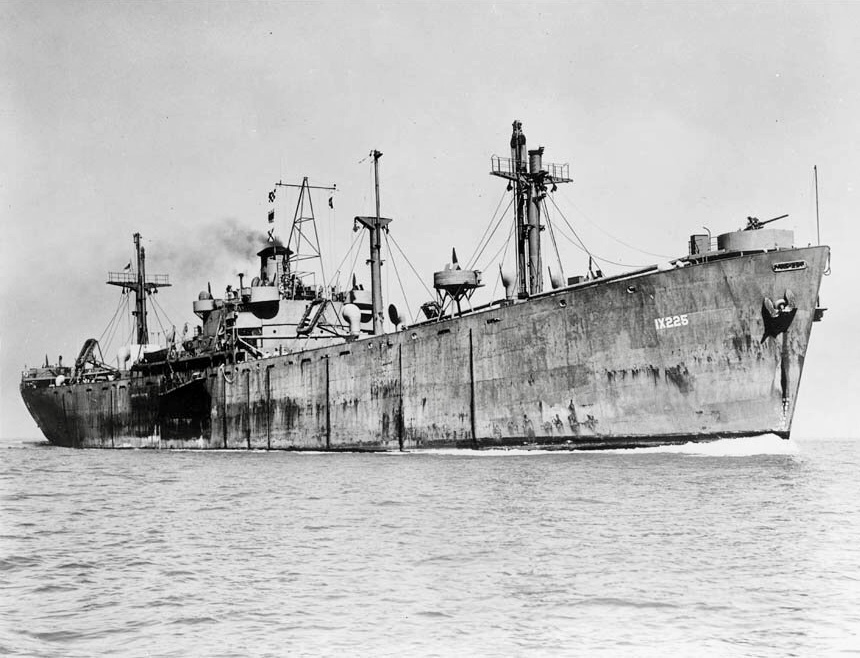
- USS Harcourt

History

United States
- Name: John M. Clayton (1943-1945); Harcourt (1945-1946)
- Namesake: John M. Clayton; Harcourt
- Owner: American-Hawaiian Steamship Co. (1943-1945); United States Navy (1943-1946); Maritime Commission (1946)
- Builder: California Shipbuilding Corp.
- Laid down: 23 November 1942
- Launched: 27 December 1942
- Sponsored by: Mrs. Barbara Bechtel
- Completed: 8 January 1943
- Out of service: 17 May 1946
- Stricken: 5 June 1946
- Identification: Hull number: IX-225
- Honors and awards: See Awards
- Fate: Scrapped, 1962

General characteristics
- Class & type: Liberty ship; type EC2-S-C1, standard
- Tonnage: 10,865 LT DWT; 7,176 GRT
- Displacement: 3,380 long tons (3,434 t) (light); 14,245 long tons (14,474 t) (max)
- Length: 441 feet 6 inches (135 m) oa; 416 feet (127 m) pp; 427 feet (130 m) lwl
- Beam: 57 feet (17 m)
- Draft: 27 ft 9.25 in (8.4646 m)
- Installed power: 2 × Oil fired 450 °F (232 °C) boilers, operating at 220 psi (1,500 kPa); 2,500 hp (1,900 kW)
- Propulsion: 1 × triple-expansion steam engine, (manufactured by General Machinery Corp., Hamilton, Ohio); 1 × screw propeller
- Speed: 11.5 knots (21.3 km/h; 13.2 mph)
- Capacity: 562,608 cubic feet (15,931 m^{3}) (grain); 499,573 cubic feet (14,146 m^{3}) (bale)
- Armament: 1 × single 5"/38 cal guns; 4 × single Bofors 40 mm guns

SS John M. Clayton was an American Liberty ship built in 1942 for service in World War II. She was later acquired by the United States Navy and renamed USS Harcourt (IX-225). Her namesake was John M. Clayton, an American senator from 1853 to 1856.

== Description ==
The ship was 442 ft 8 in (134.92 m) long overall (417 ft 9 in (127.33 m) between perpendiculars, 427 ft 0 in (130.15 m) waterline), with a beam of 57 ft 0 in (17.37 m). She had a depth of 34 ft 8 in (10.57 m) and a draught of 27 ft 9 in (8.46 m). She was assessed at 7,210 GRT, 4,880 NRT, 10,856 DWT.

She was powered by a triple expansion steam engine, which had cylinders of 24.5 inches (62 cm), 37 inches (94 cm) and 70 inches (180 cm) diameter by 70 inches (180 cm) stroke. The engine was built by the Worthington Pump & Machinery Corporation, Harrison, New Jersey. It drove a single screw propeller, which could propel the ship at 11 knots (20 km/h).

== Construction and career ==
John M. Clayton was laid down on 23 November 1942 at Los Angeles, California, by the California Shipbuilding Corp., under a Maritime Commission contract (M.C.E. Hull 687). She was launched on 27 December 1942 and sponsored by Mrs. Barbara Bechtel. the ship was completed on 8 January 1943.

Sailing for the American-Hawaiian Steamship Co., she carried war cargoes in both the Atlantic and Pacific Oceans until hit by a Japanese bomb on 2 January 1945 during the Mindoro landings in the Philippines. Based on Edwin Stauffacher's service on board the ship, he was awarded the Mariner's Medal, Combat Bar, Pacific War Zone Bar, Philippine Liberation Medal, Victory Medal and the Presidential Testimonial Letter. Her crew beached the ship before she went down; she was subsequently raised and taken to Pearl Harbor where the yard force working with customary efficiency and speed repaired the gaping hole in her port side. Acquired by the Navy on a bareboat basis, the ship commissioned as Harcourt (IX-225) on 22 June 1945.

Ready for service on 10 July 1945, Harcourt sailed for Eniwetok with fleet supplies. She then sailed for Tokyo, arriving on 17 September with a load of freight for the 3rd Fleet, and remained there to assist in the occupation until 31 March 1946, when she sailed for San Francisco. Harcourt arrived San Francisco on 22 April, decommissioned 17 May, and was delivered to the War Shipping Administration at Suisun Bay, California. She remained in the Suisun Bay Reserve Fleet in a damaged condition and later stricken rom the Naval Register on 5 June 1946, sold for scrap to Zidell Exploration Co., in 1962.

== Awards ==
- Asiatic-Pacific Campaign Medal
- World War II Victory Medal
- American Campaign Medal
- Navy Occupation Service Medal (with Asia clasp)
