= SS Meredith Victory =

Victory ship of the United States

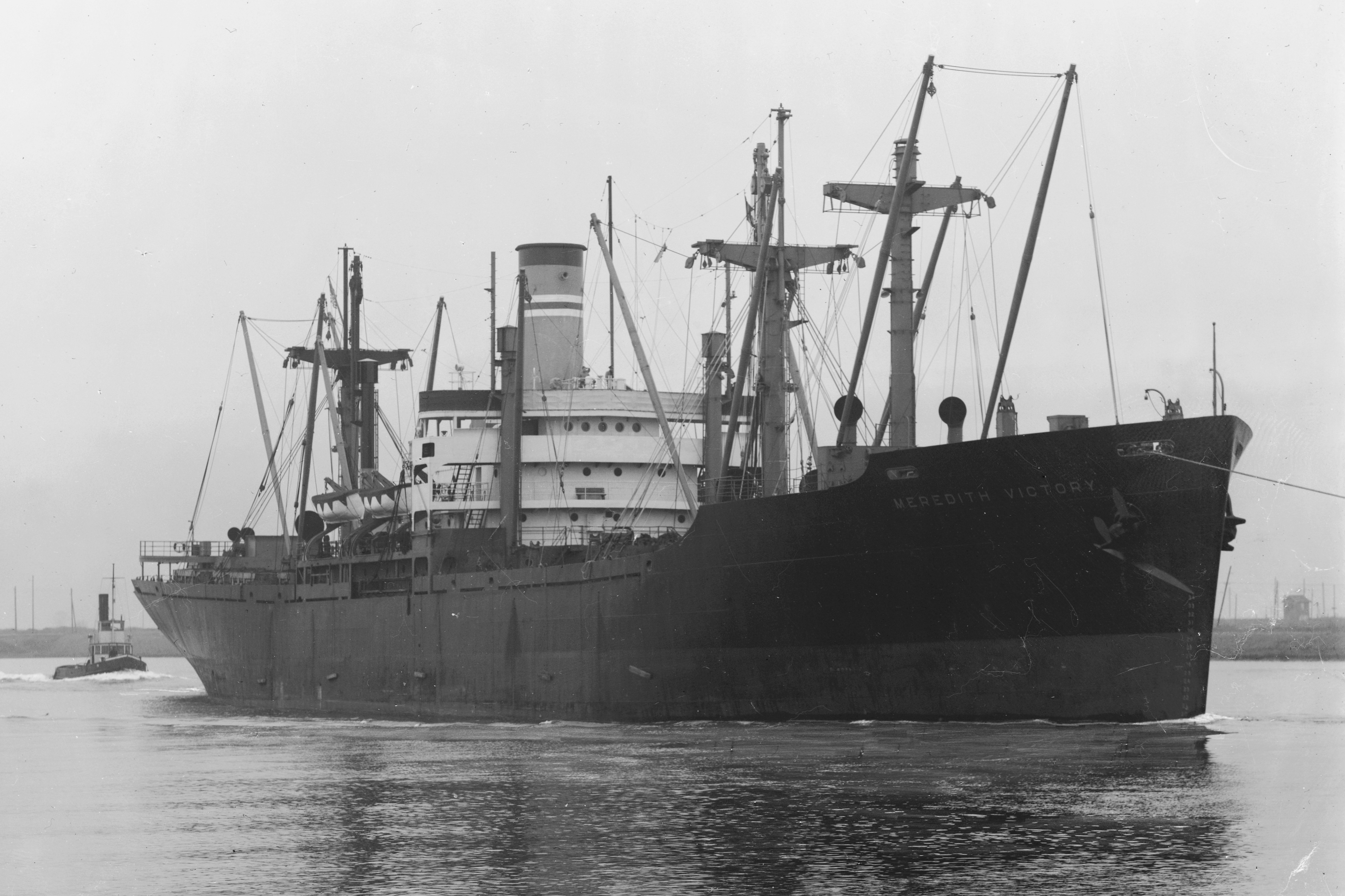
- Meredith Victory in Antwerp

History

United States
- Name: Meredith Victory
- Builder: CalShip, Los Angeles, California
- Yard number: V83
- Laid down: May 1, 1945
- Launched: June 23, 1945
- Completed: July 24, 1945
- Home port: Los Angeles
- Identification: IMO number: 5232593
- Honors and awards: Merchant Marine Gallant Ship Citation
- Fate: Broken up in China, 1993

General characteristics
- Class & type: Victory Ship
- Type: VC2-S-AP2
- Tonnage: 10,658
- Displacement: 15200 tons (at 28-foot draft)
- Length: 455 feet (139 m)
- Beam: 62 feet (19 m)
- Draft: 28 feet (7.6 m)
- Depth of hold: 38 feet (11.5 m)
- Installed power: 6600shp, 4855 kW
- Propulsion: 2 steam turbines
- Speed: 15 to 17 knots (28 to 31 km/h)
- Capacity: 59 total (35 crew members, 12 officers, and 12 passengers)
- Armament: 1 × 5 inch (127 mm)/38 caliber gun as Victory ship; 1 × 3 inch (76 mm)/50 caliber gun; 8 × 20 mm Oerlikon

The SS Meredith Victory was a United States Merchant Marine Victory ship, a type of cargo freighter built for World War II. Under the leadership of Captain Leonard LaRue, Meredith Victory is credited with the largest humanitarian rescue operation by a single ship, evacuating more than 14,000 refugees in a single trip during the Korean War. The vessel has often been described as the "Ship of Miracles" as it was designed to carry only 12 passengers with a 47-person crew.

== History ==
The SS Meredith Victory was named after Meredith College, a small women's college in North Carolina. The ship was built to transport supplies and equipment overseas during World War II. During that war, it was operated by American President Lines. In 1950, it was laid up at Olympia, Washington, as part of the National Defense Reserve Fleet. The ship was then deployed in the Korean War.

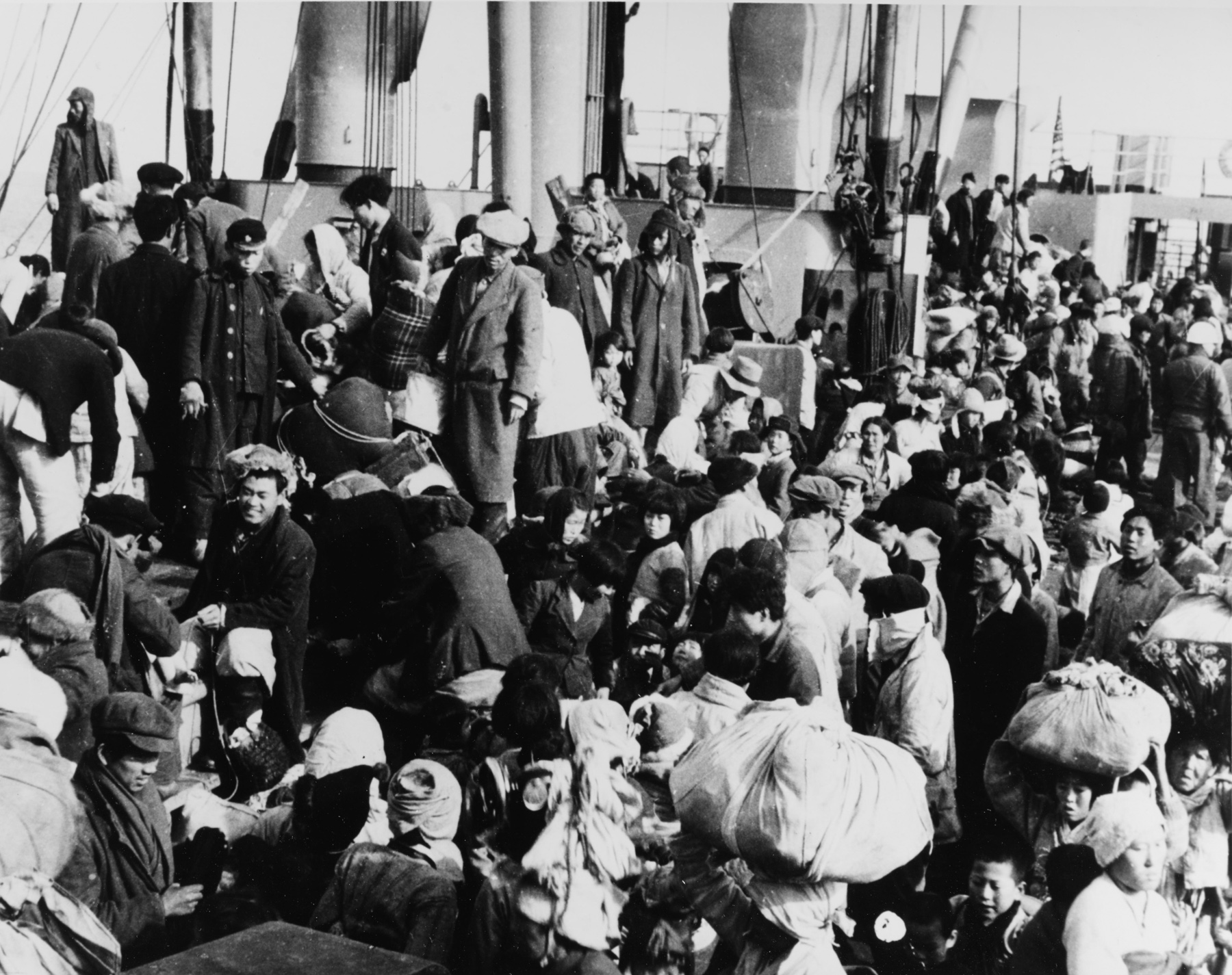
Refugees on Meredith during Heungnam evacuation

In December 1950, United Nations Command (UNC) troops were executing a tactical withdrawal from the Chosin Reservoir against the People's Volunteer Army (PVA) and Korean People's Army forces. Over 100,000 UNC soldiers were to evacuate the city of Hungnam on 193 ships bound for the southern port of Pusan. News of the evacuation spread, and nearly an equal number of civilians also gathered at the port, hoping to board as well.

On December 20, after arriving at the port of Hungnam, U.S. army colonels went on board and explained the current grave situation and proposed rescue of refugees. Captain Leonard LaRue decided to evacuate as many refugees as possible. Boarding went on from the afternoon of December 22 until the next morning. Using booms and makeshift elevators, the crew filled the five cargo holds and the entire main deck. Although the ship was built to accommodate only 12 passengers, besides the crew and staff, more than 14,000 Korean civilians were crammed aboard. Meredith Victory departed shortly after 11 am on December 23 for Pusan, about 450 nautical miles (830 km; 520 mi) away, as bombardment from UNC ships and explosives destroyed the port to deny its use to the enemy. The ship had no escort or means of self-defense-the only gun onboard was a pistol carried by Captain LaRue.

Years later, LaRue would reflect on that trip:

I think often of that voyage. I think of how such a small vessel was able to hold so many persons and surmount endless perils without harm to a soul. And, as I think, the clear, unmistakable message comes to me that on that Christmastide, in the bleak and bitter waters off the shores of Korea, God's own hand was at the helm of my ship.

Despite the fact that the refugees were "packed like sardines in a can" and most had to remain standing up, shoulder-to-shoulder, in freezing weather conditions during the entire voyage, there were no injuries or casualties on board. There was very little food or water, and the people were virtually unable to move. J. Robert Lunney, Staff Officer on the ship and a navy veteran of World War II, stated:

There's no explanation for why the Korean people, as stoic as they are, were able to stand virtually motionless and in silence. We were impressed by the conduct of the refugees, despite their desperate plight. We were touched by it.

First Mate D.S. Savastio, who only had first aid training, delivered five babies during the three-day passage to safety. The ship arrived in Pusan on Christmas Eve, but no one was allowed off except a few wounded and those identified as communist sympathizers. Meredith Victory had to travel another 50 miles (80 km) to Geoje Island before it could debark its passengers on December 26.

Among the passengers were the parents of Moon Jae-in, the 12th (19th election) president of South Korea. He was born on Geoje Island two years after the evacuation.

Captain LaRue remained in command until the ship was decommissioned in 1952. He left the sea and became a Benedictine monk of Newtown Abbey, New Jersey. On March 25, 2019, Bishop Arthur Serratelli, bishop of the Roman Catholic Diocese of Paterson opened the canonization cause for LaRue, known as Brother Marinus, OSB.

After the Korean War, the ship sat in the harbor of Bremerton, Washington, as part of the "mothball fleet" until it was put back in service in 1966 for some missions during the Vietnam War, for which she was converted to a troop ship.

In 1973, the ship was laid up in Suisun Bay. In 1993, it was towed to China and scrapped.

== Awards and distinctions ==
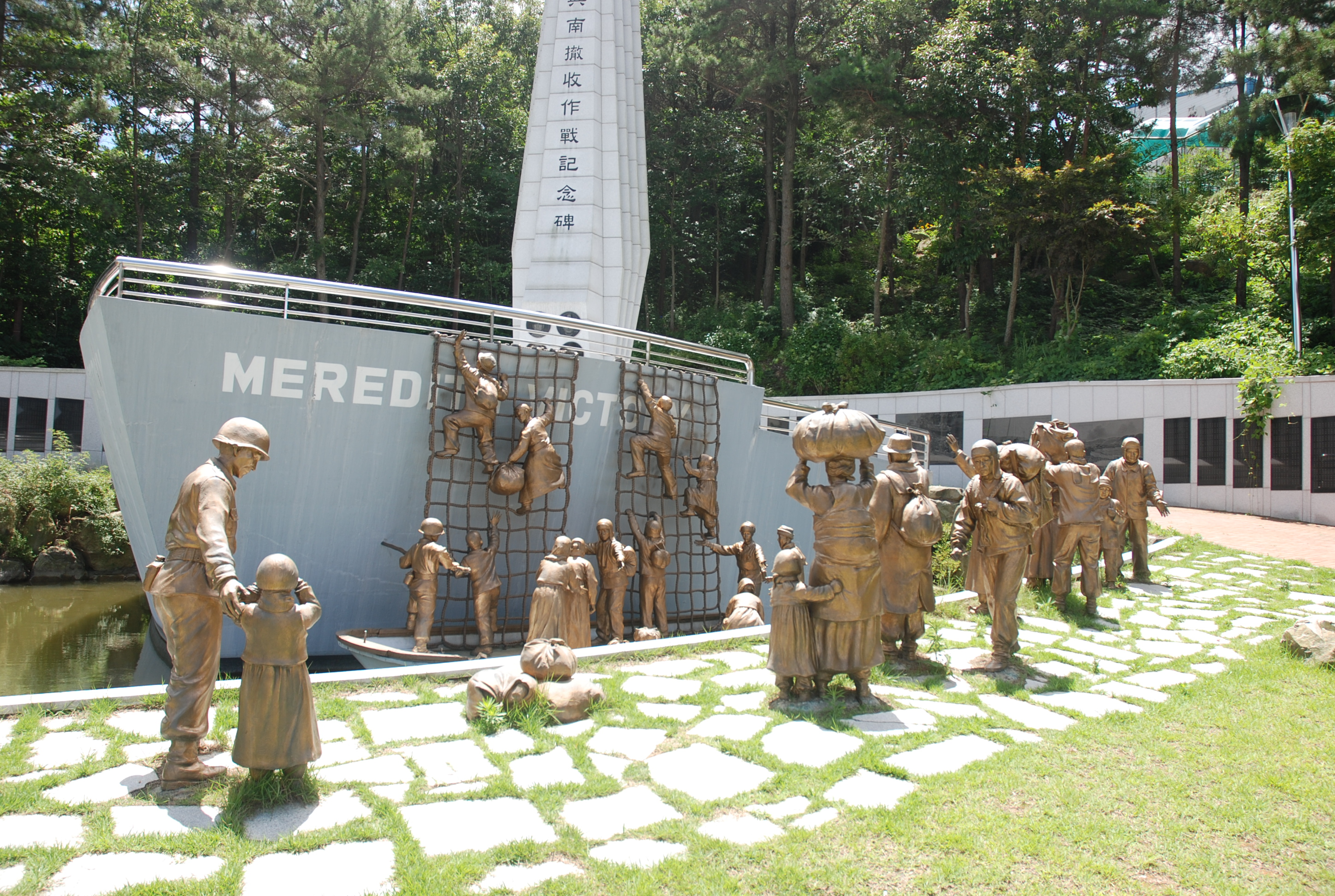
Hungnam Evacuation Memorial at Geoje POW camp.

After the war, the South Korean government honored Captain Leonard LaRue with the Gold Star Eulji - Order of Military Merit (1955) and the ship's crews with the Presidential Citation (1958).

On August 24, 1960, the United States Merchant Marine awarded the ship's crew all the Merchant Marine Meritorious Service Medal, its highest honor. and the SS Meredith Victory was conferred the title of "Gallant Ship" by a special act of the U.S. Congress that was signed by President Dwight D. Eisenhower.

The Department of Transportation declared it "the greatest rescue in the history of mankind". Guinness World Records has described it as "the largest evacuation from land by a single ship".

== Depictions ==
The documentary film Ship of Miracles, describes the events of the rescue.

The SS Meredith Victory is featured prominently in the 2012 historical novel Hope in Hungnam.

The drama film Ode to My Father begins with the Hungnam evacuation in 1950 and shows the evacuation process by the ship in detail.

The evacuation and the SS Meredith Victory play a part in the finale of the TV series Timeless (episode "The Miracle of Christmas - Part 1").

== See also ==
- SS Lane Victory
