= Merchant Marine Mariner's Medal =

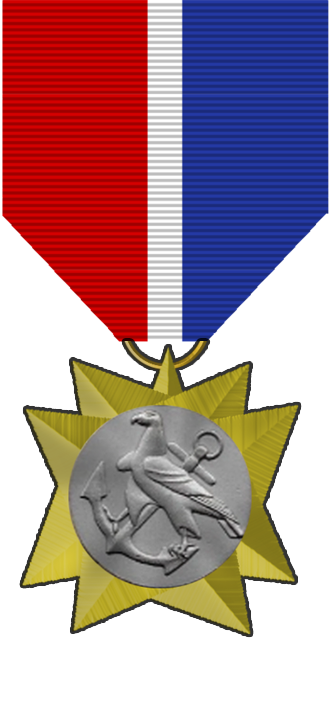
- Black and white photo of the medal from a 1946 War Shipping Administration publication
- Type: Military medal
- Awarded for: Awarded to United States Merchant Marine seamen who were killed or wounded as a direct result of conflict against an opposing armed force
- Presented by: United States Maritime Administration
- Ribbon

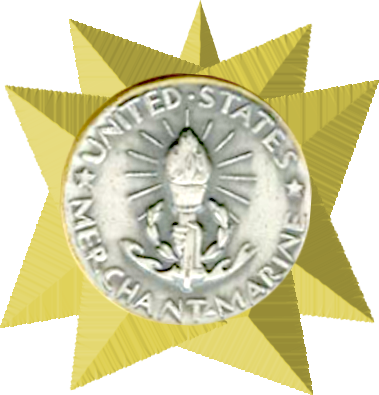
- Reverse
- Campaign: Second World War
- Status: No longer issued
- Established: May 10, 1943
- Final award: June 30, 1956

Highlights
- Total: 6,635

Precedence
- Next (higher): Merchant Marine Gallant Ship Citation Ribbon
- Equivalent: Purple Heart
- Next (lower): Merchant Marine Combat Bar

The Merchant Marine Mariner's Medal is a decoration of the United States Merchant Marine. Because the Merchant Marine was not considered a branch of the U.S. Armed Forces, the Purple Heart was not available to Merchant Mariners; as such, the Mariner's Medal was established by an Act of Congress on 10 May 1943 to solve this dilemma.

Awarded only to members of the United States Merchant Marine, the Mariner's Medal recognizes seamen who were killed or wounded as a direct result of conflict against an opposing armed force; in specific, it was awarded to any seaman who while serving in a ship during a war period is wounded, suffers physical injury, or suffers through dangerous exposure as a result of an act of enemy of the United States. In the event any such seaman dies from the wounds or injuries before the award can be made to him, the medal may be presented to the person named in the War Risk Policy as his beneficiary. 6,635 Mariner's Medals were awarded for service in the Second World War; all further awards of the Mariner's Medal were suspended on 30 June 1956 and it has not been awarded in subsequent U.S. theaters of conflict.

As the Merchant Marine Meritorious Service Medal is considered a federal service decoration, it may be worn on the uniforms of active, reserve, and retired uniformed service members.

== Design ==
Designed by Paul Manship, subsequent awards of the medal are represented by 5/16th inch gold stars affixed to both the suspension ribbon and the ribbon bar.

The cases supplied with the medal were also used for the Merchant Marine Distinguished Service Medal and the Merchant Marine Meritorious Service Medal.

On original Second World War issues of the Mariner's Medal, a small triangle separates "United" and "States"; re-issues have a small dot. Also on originals, the designer's initials "P.M." (Paul Manship) are below the wreath, to either side of the cuff; subsequent re-issues of the medal lack these devices.

== See also ==
- Awards and decorations of the United States government
- Awards and decorations of the United States military
