= Merchant Marine Gallant Ship Citation =

- Type: Unit Award
- Awarded for: Officers and crew of ships involved in outstanding or gallant action in marine disasters or other emergencies for the purpose of saving life or property at sea.
- Presented by: United States Maritime Administration
- Eligibility: US and foreign flagged merchant vessels
- Established: by Executive Order 9472, August 29, 1944
- Merchant Marine Gallant Ship Citation Ribbon

Precedence
- Next (higher): Merchant Marine Meritorious Service Medal
- Next (lower): Merchant Marine Mariner's Medal

The Merchant Marine Gallant Ship Citation is an award of the United States Merchant Marine. The award is presented as a bronze plaque to vessels, with officers and crew being awarded a ribbon bar to denote the award. The award is open to both United States flagged vessels and foreign flagged vessels.

== Criteria ==
The Gallant Ship Citation is awarded by the Secretary of Transportation to vessels, including foreign vessels, for "participating in outstanding or gallant action in a marine disaster or other emergency to save life or property at sea."

A bronze Gallant Ship Citation Plaque is awarded to the vessels. The officers and crew who served on those vessels designated as Gallant Ships are awarded a citation ribbon bar. At the center of the ribbon is a silver seahorse device.

== Gallant Ships ==
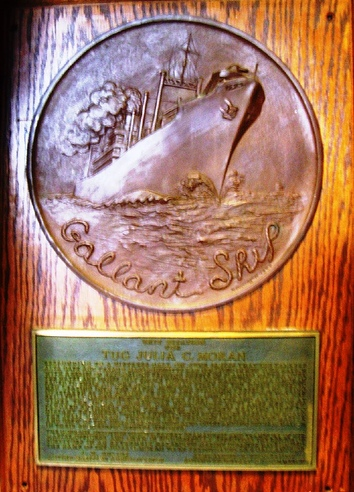
Citation Plaque of the Tug Julia C. Moran

World War II

- SS Stanvac Calcutta, actions on June 6, 1942
- SS Stephen Hopkins, actions on September 27, 1942
- SS Adoniram Judson, actions in October 1944, presented December 10, 1944
- SS Samuel Parker, actions in February 1943
- SS Cedar Mills, actions in December 1943
- SS William Moultrie
- SS Marcus Daly, actions in October 1944
- SS Virginia Dare
- SS Nathaniel Greene

Post-World War II

- SS Meredith Victory, actions in December 1950, presented August 24, 1960
- SS Cape Ann, presented October 23, 1957
- SS Ile de France, presented October 23, 1957
- USNS Private William H. Thomas, presented October 23, 1957
- MV Western Pioneer, presented June 29, 1961
- SS Dolly Turman, presented August 14, 1963
- Japan Bear, actions in 1963
- SS Philippine Mail, presented February 28, 1964
- SS President Wilson, presented April 1, 1965
- SS Cotton State, actions in February 1965, presented 1967
- Tug Adeline Foss, actions in November 1965, presented 1967
- Tug Julia C. Moran, actions on June 16, 1966, presented 1968
- SS President McKinley, actions on January 5, 1967, presented 1968
- West German ship Mathilde Bolten, actions on December 20, 1964, presented 1969
- West German ship Weissenburg, actions on May 7, 1965, presented 1969
- SS President Jackson, actions on January 14, 1970
- MS Khian Star, actions on December 26, 1969, presented 1971
- FDNY Fire Fighter actions on May 30, 1973, presented May 22, 1975
- TT Williamsburgh, actions on October 4, 1980, presented May 21, 1981
- MV San Francisco, actions on October 31, 1984, presented 1984
- Tug Stamford, actions on May 5, 1986, presented 1989
- MV Green Lake, actions on December 31, 2018, presented 2019
