= SS Marcus Daly =

World War II Liberty ship of the United States

- A Liberty ship at sea

History

United States
- Name: Marcus Daly
- Namesake: Marcus Daly
- Builder: Kaiser Shipyards, Richmond, California
- Yard number: 1697
- Way number: 7
- Laid down: 28 June 1943
- Launched: 24 July 1943
- Completed: 5 August 1943
- Honors and awards: Gallant Ship Citation Ribbon
- Fate: Scrapped, 1968

General characteristics
- Class & type: Type EC2-S-C1 Liberty ship
- Displacement: 14,245 long tons (14,474 t)
- Length: 441 ft 6 in (134.57 m) o/a; 417 ft 9 in (127.33 m) p/p; 427 ft (130 m) w/l
- Beam: 57 ft (17 m)
- Draft: 27 ft 9 in (8.46 m)
- Propulsion: Two oil-fired boilers; Triple-expansion steam engine; 2,500 hp (1,900 kW); Single screw
- Speed: 11 knots (20 km/h; 13 mph)
- Range: 20,000 nmi (37,000 km; 23,000 mi)
- Capacity: 10,856 t (10,685 long tons) deadweight (DWT)
- Crew: 81
- Armament: Stern-mounted 4 in (100 mm) deck gun for use against surfaced submarines, variety of anti-aircraft guns

SS Marcus Daly was a liberty ship built by the Kaiser Shipyards at their Permanente No.1 yard at Richmond, California, and launched on 24 July 1943.

== Ship history ==
The ship was operated by Sudden & Christensen, San Francisco, for the War Shipping Administration, and between September 1943 and April 1944 operated in convoy between northern Australia and Papua New Guinea.

On July 30, 1944, the ship sailed from Wilmington, Los Angeles, loaded with 12 night-fighter aircraft, and with a crew of 27 United States Navy Armed Guards and 41 men of the Merchant Marine. The aircraft were unloaded at Finschhafen, New Guinea, on August 28, 1944. The ship then sailed on to Oro Bay and to unload the rest of the cargo.

After three months operating between various ports in New Guinea and the Admiralty Islands, on October 18 the ship sailed from Hollandia, bound for Tacloban in the Philippines. She was loaded with 600 men, 31 officers, and all their equipment and vehicles. While at the dock in Tacloban the ship was attacked from the air several times. Marcus Daly was credited with shooting down three Japanese aircraft, and for their efforts the men were commended by General Douglas MacArthur.

In early December the ship sailed from Tacloban in a convoy of 40 ships bound for Leyte. On December 5, 1944, the convoy was north-east of Mindanao when they were attacked by Japanese aircraft. The SS Antoine Saugrain was hit by two torpedoes, abandoned, and sank the next day. Marcus Daly shot down two aircraft, but at around 1530 was struck by a kamikaze which made a hole "large enough to drive a train through" and set the ship on fire. Three crew members - one Navy Armed Guard and two Merchant Marine - were killed, and 7 wounded, and 200 troops aboard were listed as killed, wounded or missing. The blaze was finally brought under control around midnight, and the ship limped into Leyte the next day. On December 10 while at anchor she shot down another aircraft, which then crashed into her, setting LCT-1075, which was alongside, on fire. An Armed Guard officer and seven others were wounded, but the ship remained afloat.

On December 30, after repairs at Hollandia, Marcus Daly sailed to San Francisco, arriving on January 28, 1945. The ship's crew were awarded the Merchant Marine Gallant Ship Citation Ribbon.

The Marcus Daly was scrapped at National City, California, in 1968.

== Awards ==
Able Seaman on the SS Marcus Daly was given the Merchant Marine Distinguished Service Medal by The President of the United States. During the initial invasion of the Philippine Islands at Tacloban at Leyte. Crawford volunteered for the forward gun crew which, acting in countless attacks for many days, by repulsing the enemy and bringing down many planes in 1944. He was killed by a Kamikaze plane in one of the many attacks. For the President the award was given by Admiral Emory S. Land.
