= Leonard LaRue =

American sailor and Benedictine monk (1914–2001)

Servant of God Leonard LaRue
- Born: January 14, 1914; Philadelphia, Pennsylvania, US
- Died: August 14, 2001 (aged 87); Newton, New Jersey, US

Leonard LaRue (January 14, 1914 – October 14, 2001), (later known as Brother Marinus), was an American Catholic sea captain who evacuated over 14,000 civilian refugees on his freighter from a besieged city during the Korean War. Several years after the war, LaRue entered a Benedictine monastery to become a religious brother. He was declared a Servant of God in 2019.

== Early career ==
Leonard LaRue was born on January 14, 1914, in Philadelphia, Pennsylvania. Becoming interested in a life at sea as a teenager, he entered the Pennsylvania Nautical School In Philadelphia to become a merchant sailor. As part of the curriculum, he spent time sailing aboard the school ship USS Annapolis. Larue graduated in 1934 and started working on freighters.

After the American entry into World War II in December 1941, LaRue served on freighters transporting war supplies from the United States to the port of Murmansk in the far north of the Soviet Union. The patrols of enemy German U-boats, along with the treacherous seas and cold weather, made these Murmansk runs very dangerous.

== Rescue operation ==
=== Arrival in Hŭngnam ===
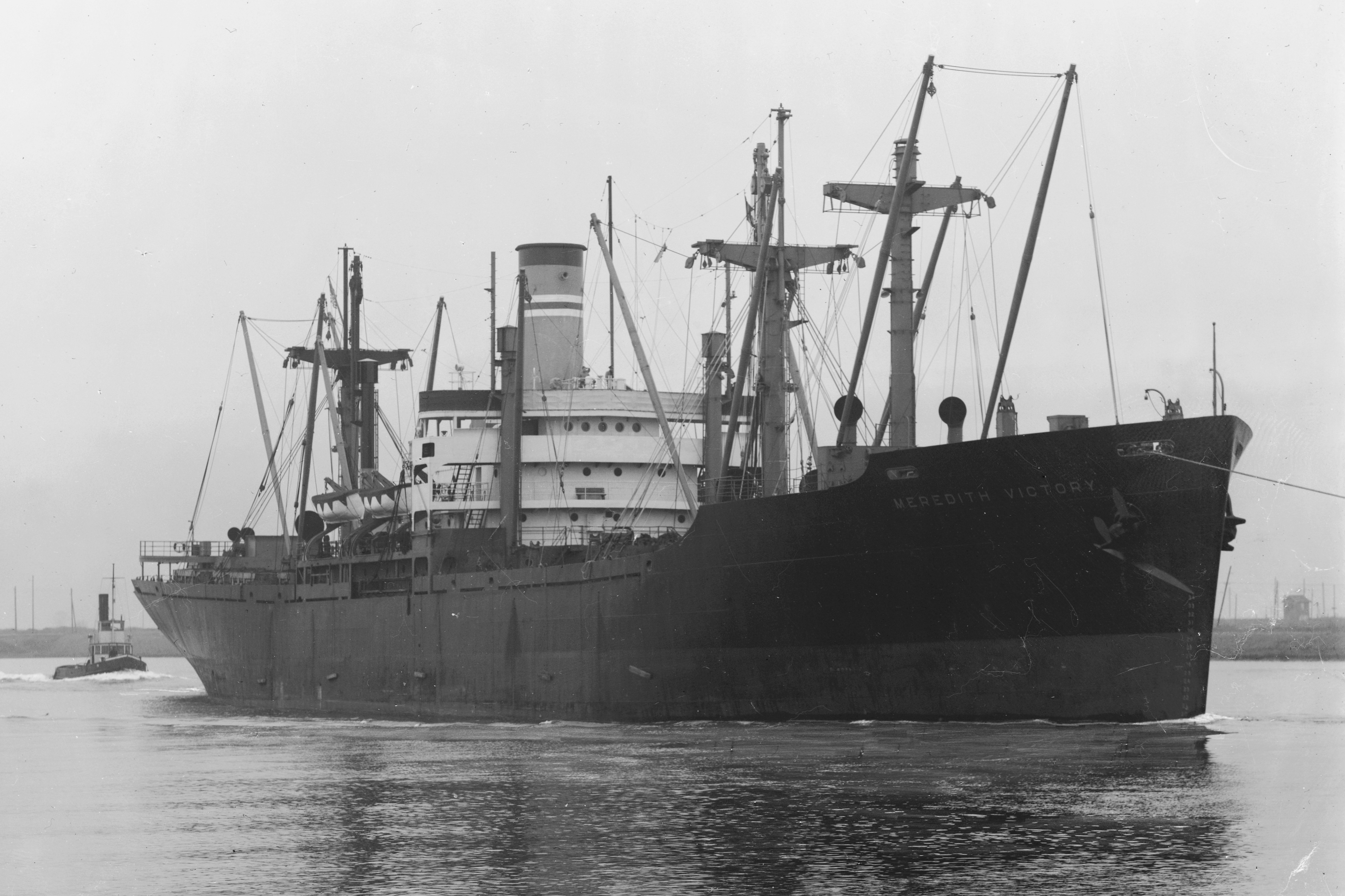
SS Meredith Victory

In June 1950, the North Korean invasion of South Korea brought United Nations military involvement on the Korean Peninsula. Serving as captain of the SS Meredith Victory, LaRue made numerous trips to the port of Busan (Pusan) in South Korea, bringing supplies to the retreating UN forces. After the successful UN landing at Incheon in South Korea, he started delivering supplies to that port. As the UN forces pushed into North Korea, the Meredith Victory started visiting ports on the eastern coast of that country.

In November 1950, a massive Chinese counterattack by the People's Volunteer Army (PVA) started forcing the outnumbered UN forces to retreat again. It also spawned a massive refugee crisis, with tens of thousands of North Koreans fleeing the battle zone. During December 1950, over 100 ships docked at the port of Hŭngnam in North Korea. They evacuated over 100,000 UN troops and tens of thousands of North Korean refugees. On December 22, 1950, the SS Meredith Victory, docked at Hŭngnam, carrying 300 tons of aviation fuel. It was one of the last ships to visit the port as the PVA was approaching it rapidly. However, over 14,000 refugees were still waiting evacuation at the port. Naval ships were bombarding PVA forces outside the city, with naval aviation conducting continuous bombing runs. LaRue later described the scene:

''I trained my binoculars and saw a pitiable scene. Refugees thronged the docks. With them was everything they could wheel, carry or drag. Beside them, like frightened chicks, were their children.''

=== Trip to Geoje Island ===
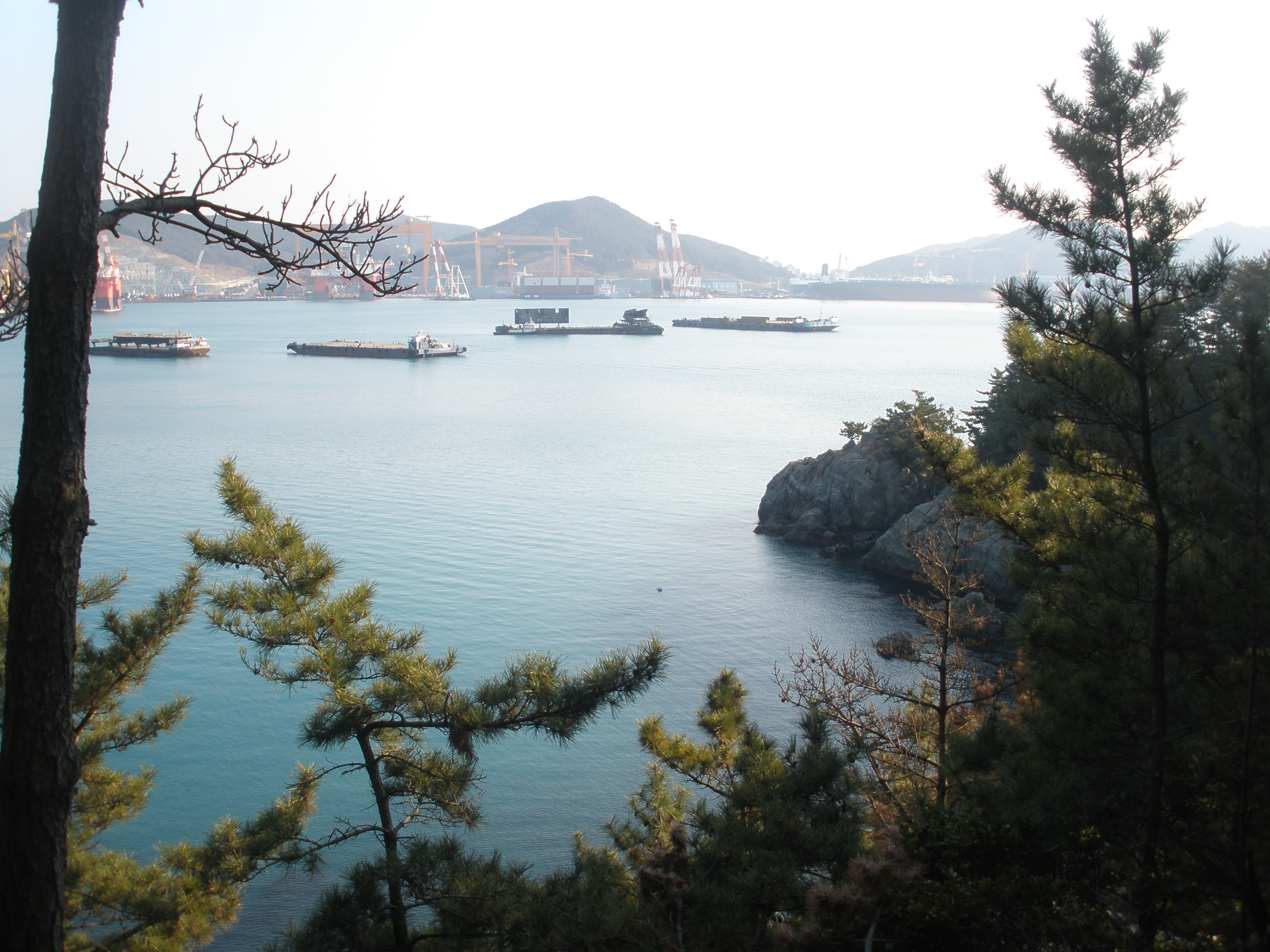
Geoje Island (2011)

LaRue decided that he could not leave the refugees there. He ordered his crew bring aboard all the North Koreans. Standing on pallets, the refugees were loaded by crane into the ship holds. The SS Meredith Victory left Hŭngnam on the 377 miles (607 km) voyage to Busan on morning of December 23rd. The refugees were jammed into the holds and decks of the ship. They had little food or water, no bathrooms, no medical supplies and no blankets. LaRue was forced to navigate through waters laced with naval mines and had no escort ships. At one point, some people in the lower hold built a fire to warm themselves next to the barrels of fuel. It was quickly extinguished by the crew.

Arriving in Busan on December 24th, LaRue was told by local authorities that he could not disembark the refugees; they had too many already. The ship was rerouted to Geoje Island, 50 miles (80 km) to the southwest. The Meredith Victory arrived at Geoje Island the next day. On December 26th, the US Navy sent two LST landing craft to the ship to unload its passengers; the dock was unable to take the ship. All 14,000 refugees arrived safely, with five babies being born during the trip. Later describing the rescue, LaRue wrote:

''I think often of that voyage. I think of how such a small vessel was able to hold so many persons and surmount endless perils without harm to a soul. The clear, unmistakable message comes to me that on that Christmastide, in the bleak and bitter waters off the shores of Korea, God's own hand was at the helm of my ship.''

== After the war ==
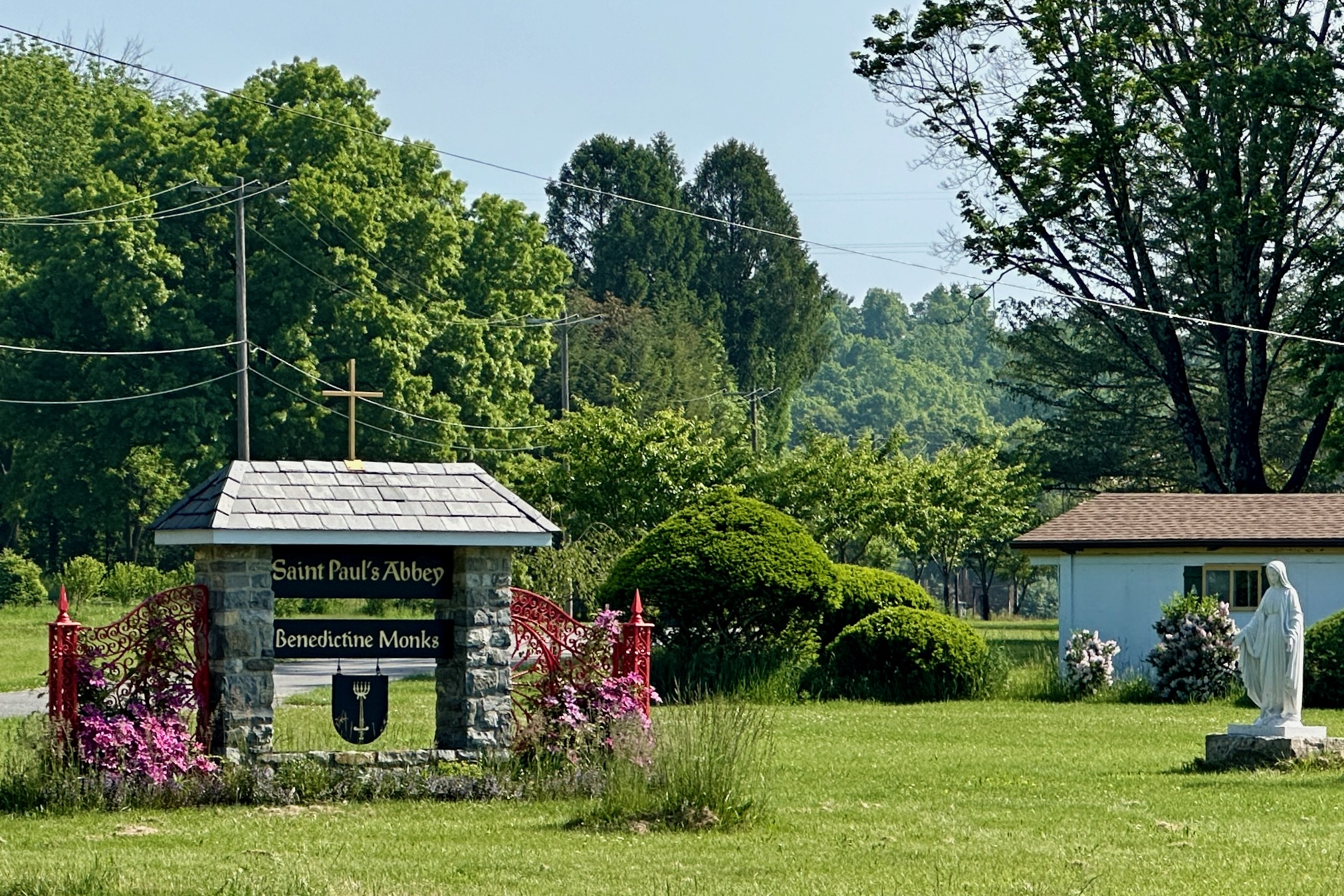
St. Paul's Abbey, Newton, New Jersey (2024)

LaRue continued sailing on the Meredith Victory until it was decommissioned in 1952. Two years later, he decided to become a religious brother. LaRue entered St. Paul's Abbey, a Benedictine monastery near Newton, New Jersey. Given the "Brother Marinus", LaRue would have worked in the fields and buildings of the monastery as well as helped local parishes and hospitals.

South Korean President Syngman Rhee awarded the officers and crew of the Meredith Victory the Korean Presidential Citation. By an act of the US Congress, the officers and crew were awarded the Gallant Ship Unit Citation Bar. LaRue received the Merchant Marine Meritorious Service Medal. The citation for the Gallant Ship Award read:

"The courage, resourcefulness, sound seamanship and teamwork of her master, officers, and crew in successfully completing one of the greatest marine rescues in the history of the world have caused the name of the Meredith Victory to be perpetuated as that of a Gallant Ship."

LaRue died at St. Paul's on October 14, 2001.

== Veneration ==
On March 25, 2019, Bishop Arthur Serratelli of the Diocese of Paterson opened the canonization cause for LaRue, giving him the title of Servant of God.

== Awards and decorations ==
- Gold Star Eulji - Order of Military Merit (1955)
- Presidential Citation (1958)
- Merchant Marine Meritorious Service Medal (1960)

== See also ==
- Hungnam evacuation
- Korean War
