= Merchant Marine Outstanding Achievement Medal =

Merchant Marine Medal for Outstanding Achievement
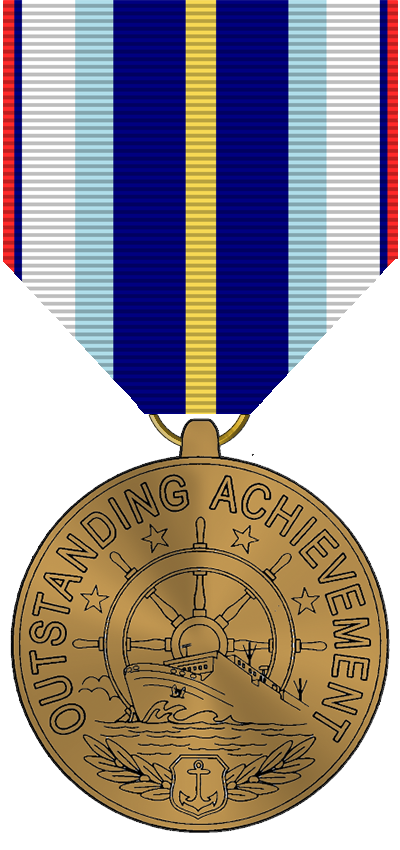
- Merchant Marine Medal for Outstanding Achievement
- Type: Decoration
- Awarded for: An act or operation of humanitarian nature directly to an individual or groups of individuals, long and dedicated years of service or achievement, or for an extraordinary valuable contribution or work to the maritime industry.
- Presented by: the Administrator, United States Maritime Administration
- Eligibility: Merchant Mariners
- Ribbon

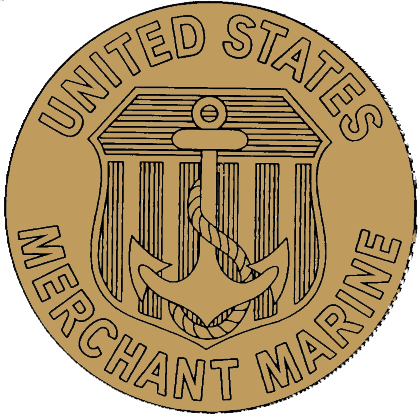
- Reverse
- Status: Current
- Established: 2002

The Merchant Marine Medal for Outstanding Achievement is a decoration of the United States Merchant Marine awarded by the United States Maritime Administration. It was established in 2002 and is awarded to members of the maritime industry who have made extraordinarily valuable contributions to the merchant marine.

[A]warded to recognize merchant mariners who have participated in an act or operation of humanitarian nature directly to an individual or groups of individuals. This medal may be awarded to those leaders in the maritime industry who have dedicated years of service or achievement and/or given an extraordinary valuable contribution or work to the maritime industry. This medal requires the Maritime Administrator’s approval for award.

== Recipients ==
2005: Jerome C. Donnelly, Able Bodied Seaman, M/V Davidson, for humanitarian service in areas affected by Hurricane Katrina. The M/V Davidson was under contract with the National Oceanic and Atmospheric Administration to conduct marine surveys in the Gulf of Mexico when Katrina struck. After moving away to avoid the storm, M/V Davidson was ordered to the Mississippi River's main shipping entrance to conduct an emergency survey of the lower river to New Orleans. The river and port remained closed to support ships until the survey was completed. The survey took 72 hours using the ship and its two survey launches.

2005: John A. Yarber, 2nd Assistant Engineer, USNS Pililaau, for humanitarian service in areas affected by Hurricanes Katrina and Rita.

2005: Edward B. McDonnell, LCDR/3rd Mate, SS Wright, for humanitarian service in areas affected by Hurricanes Katrina and Rita.

2009: Vincent Lombardi, Captain, M/V Thomas Jefferson (ferry), New York Waterway, for the rescue of 56 passengers off of Flight 1549 which landed in the Hudson River on Jan. 15, 2009.

2010: John M. Bozzi, 3rd Officer, USNS 1st Lt Jack Lummus (T-AK 3011), for humanitarian service in Operation Unified Response, which provided disaster relief following the 2010 Haiti earthquake.

2011: 2nd Officer Andrew Chen, USNS Bridge (T-AOE 10), for humanitarian service in Operation Tomodachi, which provided disaster relief following the 2011 earthquake and tsunami in Tōhoku, Japan.

2011: Able Seaman Christopher Lewis, USNS Rappahannock (T-AO 204), for humanitarian service in Operation Tomodachi, which provided disaster relief following the 2011 earthquake and tsunami in Tōhoku, Japan.

2012: Mark A. Ricker Jr., for humanitarian service in areas affected by Superstorm Sandy.

2012: Crew of the container ship Horizon Reliance container ship, for the rescue of the crew of the distressed vessel Liahona during a storm off the coast of Hilo, Hawaii.

2012: Robert Mason, Great Lakes Maritime Academy pilotage instructor, in recognition of more than 30 years as an instructor.

2014: Michael Hochscheidt, Engineering Department head, Great Lakes Maritime Academy, in recognition of more than 30 years as an instructor.

2015: William D. Eglinton, author of "Marine Engine Room Blue Book."

2017: Capt. Michael Horn, USMM. In recognition of a 41-year career in the U.S. Merchant Marine, including service as an instructor and mentor to Great Lakes Maritime Academy cadets after serving more than 30 years as a Merchant Marine officer.

2017: Capt. Mark Phillips, USMM. In recognition of a 42-year career in the U.S. Merchant Marine, including service as an instructor and mentor to Great Lakes Maritime Academy cadets after serving for more than 30 years as a Merchant Marine officer.

2017: Capt. Konstantinos E. Malihoutsakis. "The Maritime Administration recognizes the distinguished service and dedication to duty of CAPTAIN KONSTANTINOS MAILIHOUTSAKIS during 34 years of service and awards him with the U.S. Merchant Marine Medal for Outstanding Achievement."

2018: Commodore Harry J. Bolton Jr., USMS. He is one of five officers to achieve the rank of commodore in the U.S. Maritime Service. His citation reads:

"The Maritime Administration recognizes the distinguished service of Commodore Harry Bolton and awards him with the U.S. Merchant Marine Medal for Outstanding Achievement.

"A 1978 graduate of the California Maritime Academy, Commodore Bolton was appointed as captain in May 2008 on accepting the position of Commanding Officer of the Training Ship Golden Bear and Director of Marine Programs. Prior to joining the Golden Bear, he sailed extensively in the U.S. Merchant Marine, serving in support of the Grenada Invasion, the First Gulf War, and Operation Iraqi Freedom. He is the recipient of two Merchant Marine Expeditionary Medal and the U.S. Navy Meritorious Civil Service Award, among other decorations.

"Commodore Bolton is an Unlimited Master Mariner with 44 years of experience, including 33 years in command billets. His expertise on a broad array of topics, including theater logistics and joint military operations is well known and sought after by industry and the U.S. Armed Forces. His accomplishments include design of the English-speaking curriculum at the Maritime Academy of Asia and Pacific in the Philippines. He was appointed to the position of Commodore in August 2018.

"The wisdom and leadership of Commodore Bolton has been evident during his command of the Golden Bear. His efforts have not only improved the capabilities of that ship for California Maritime cadets, but for other state academy cadets and USMMA midshipmen as well.

"Therefore, in recognition of his lifetime of dedication to the U.S. Merchant Marine and the American Maritime Industry, and for his many contributions and achievements in the Maritime field, I am pleased to award Commodore Harry Bolton the Merchant Marine Medal for Outstanding Achievement. Our nation is grateful for his service. Signed ADM Mark H. Buzby, Maritime Administrator."

2019: Capt. Michael Surgalski, in recognition of a 40-year career, and especially for his service as an instructor at the Great Lakes Maritime Academy and as the first master of the Training Ship State of Michigan.

2019: Timothy J. Nelson, president, Northwestern Michigan College. The Great Lakes Maritime Academy is a division of Northwestern College. Nelson served as the college president from 2000-2019. During his tenure, he undertook initiatives that resulted in the Academy moving from one where cadets would earn an associate degree and a license valid for service on the Great Lakes to one where all cadets received a bachelor's degree and a license valid for service on the Great Lakes and oceans.

2024: Kirk Lunsford, in recognition of 49 years of maritime service — as a commercial fisherman and fishing boat captain in Alaska from 1973-88; and as a deckhand aboard the Guemes Island Ferry from 1988-2022. His 34 years of deckhand service aboard the ferry is the longest period of service in the history of the Guemes Island Ferry. His fishing career included two man-overboard rescues. On the Guemes Island Ferry, he served several years as union steward and trained many deckhands who went on to maritime careers.

2026: Admiral Bren Leigh Maris, Electro-Technical Officer and Marine Engineer. Awarded for emergency response during a shipboard engine room fire, the deep-water ROV rescue of an atmospheric diving suit pilot aboard M/V Olympic Challenger, development of specialized subsea intervention tooling, and design contributions to the subsea robotics and commercial diving exhibits at the Houston Museum of Natural Science Wiess Energy Hall.

== See also ==
- Awards and decorations of the United States government
- Awards and Decorations of the United States Maritime Administration
- Awards and decorations of the United States Merchant Marine
- Awards and decorations of the United States military
