= Awards and decorations of the United States Merchant Marine =

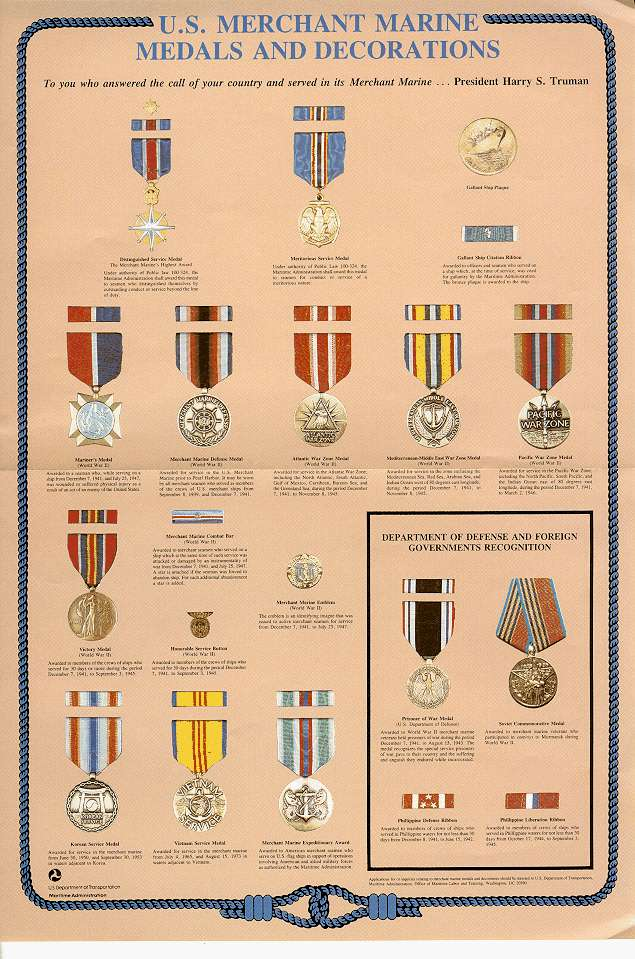
Medals and Decorations of the United States Merchant Marine

Awards and decorations of the United States Merchant Marine are civilian decorations of the United States which are issued to the members of the United States Merchant Marine for a variety of duties both in peace and war. Originally authorized to be issued by the War Shipping Administration of the World War II era, these awards were later issued by the Maritime Commission and are currently issued by the Department of Transportation's Martitime Administration.

All historical and active decorations of the U.S. Merchant Marine are as follows:

== U.S. Merchant Marine Decorations ==
Distinguished Service Medal	Meritorious Service Medal	Gallant Ship Citation	Outstanding Achievement Medal

== World War II Decorations & Service pins ==
Mariner's Medal	Combat Bar	Combat Bar with Silver star	Honorable Service Pin	Service Emblem
	No Medal	No Medal		
			No Ribbon	No Ribbon

== World War II Campaign Medals ==
Defense Medal	Atlantic War Zone Medal	Mediterranean & Middle East War Zone Medal	Pacific War Zone Medal	World War II Victory Medal

== Decorations awarded by the US Department of Defense and foreign governments ==
Prisoner of War Medal	Soviet World War II Commemorative Medal	Philippine Defense Medal	Philippine Liberation Medal

- The Prisoner of War Medal — may be awarded to any person who was a prisoner of war after April 5, 1917, (the date of the United States entry into World War I). It is awarded to any person who was taken prisoner or held captive while engaged in an action against an enemy of the United States; while engaged in military operations involving conflict with an opposing Armed Force; or while serving with friendly forces engaged in armed conflict against an opposing Armed Force in which the United States is not a belligerent party. Hostages of terrorists, and persons detained by governments in which the U.S. is not actively engaged in armed conflict are not eligible for the medal. The person's conduct, while in captivity, must have been honorable. This medal may be awarded posthumously to the surviving next of kin of the recipient.
- Soviet Commemorative Medal — "Forty Years of Victory in the Great Patriotic War 1941–1945" Jubilee Medal — Awarded to U.S. merchant mariners who participated in the Arctic Convoys to the city of Murmansk.
- Philippine Defense Medal (ribbon) — Was presented to any service member, of either the Philippine military or an allied armed force, which participated in the defense of the Philippine Islands between December 8, 1941, and June 15, 1942.
- Philippine Liberation Ribbon — Was presented to any service member, of both Philippine and allied military forces, who participated in the liberation of the Philippine Islands between October 17, 1944, and September 2, 1945.

== USMM Decorations from other past conflicts ==
Korean Service Medal	Vietnam Service Medal	9-11 Medal	9-11 Ribbon
			No Medal

- Korean Service Medal is a civil decoration awarded for Merchant Marine service during the Korean War between June 30, 1950, and September 30, 1953, in waters adjacent to Korea.
- Vietnam Service Medal is a civil decoration awarded to officers and men for service aboard merchant vessels flying the American flag in Vietnam waters between July 4, 1965, and August 15, 1973.
- 9-11 Medal is a special decoration of the U.S. Department of Transportation which was first created in 2002. The decoration recognizes those civilians and members of the military who performed heroic deeds and valorous accomplishments in the immediate aftermath of the September 11 attacks on the United States of America.
- 9-11 Ribbon is a military decoration of the U.S. Department of Transportation that was issued to both civilians and military personnel who, through service with the United States Department of Transportation, contributed to the recovery of the September 11 attacks. The ribbon was issued primarily to the United States Coast Guard, but was also authorized for any civilian personnel, and members of other military branches, who were assigned to the Department of Transportation for relief efforts against the terrorist attacks.

== Merchant Marine Expeditionary Medal ==
Merchant Marine Expeditionary Medal

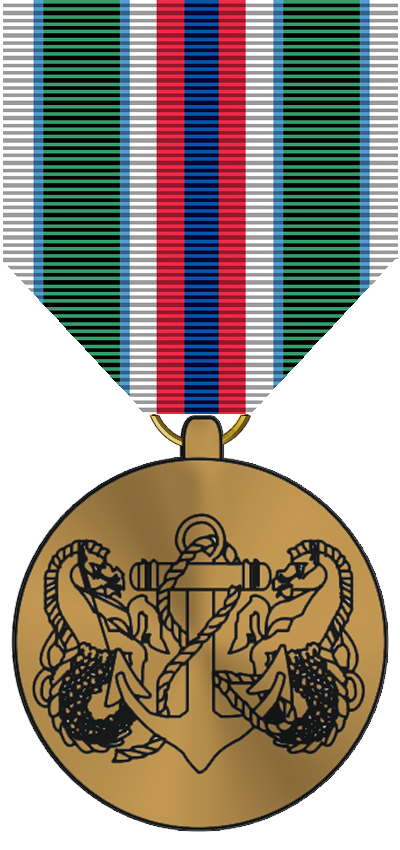

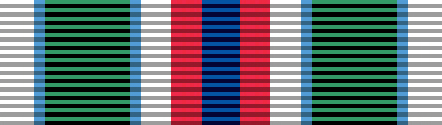

The Merchant Marine Expeditionary Medal is awarded to U.S. merchant seamen who serve on U.S.-flag ships in support of operations involving American and allied military forces. The medal is not specific to a certain military operation or conflict, but the award citation would give such details. It has been presented to individuals for service in Operations Desert Shield and Desert Storm, Operation Enduring Freedom, Operation Iraqi Freedom, Operation Restore Hope, and Operation United Shield. It has also been presented to merchant mariners operating in support of naval operations with the United States Navy's Military Sealift Command, including cadet midshipmen at the United States Merchant Marine Academy.
