= Merchant Marine Mediterranean-Middle East War Zone Medal =

Merchant Marine Mediterranean-Middle East War Zone Medal (Bar)
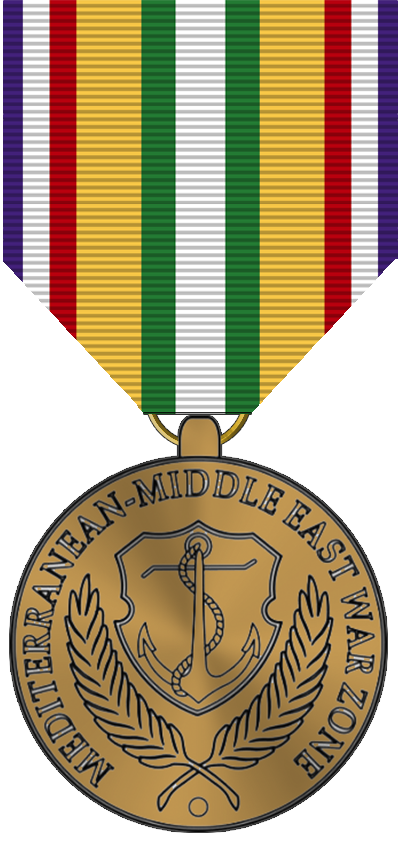
- Merchant Marine Mediterranean-Middle East War Zone Medal obverse (left) and reverse
- Type: Military medal
- Awarded for: Service in the Mediterranean-Middle East War Zone.
- Presented by: United States Maritime Administration
- Eligibility: Merchant Marine seamen
- Ribbon

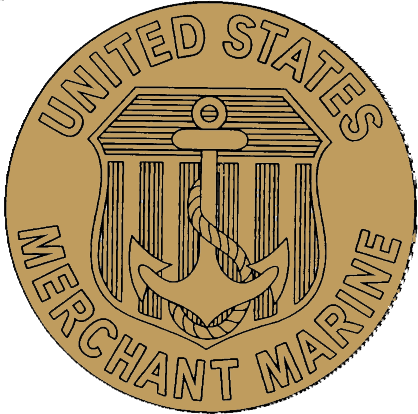
- Reverse
- Campaign: Second World War
- Established: May 10, 1944

Highlights
- Total: 150,184

Precedence
- Next (higher): Merchant Marine Atlantic War Zone Medal
- Next (lower): Merchant Marine Pacific War Zone Medal

The Merchant Marine Mediterranean-Middle East War Zone Medal (Bar) is a decoration of the United States Merchant Marine established by an Act of Congress on May 10, 1944.

== Conditions ==
The decoration is awarded to officers and men of ships operated by the War Shipping Administration for service in the Mediterranean-Middle East War Zone between December 7, 1941, and November 8, 1945. This theater of operations comprised the Mediterranean Sea, Red Sea, Arabian Sea, and Indian Ocean west of eighty degrees east longitude.

== Design ==
Prior to 1992, the Merchant Marine Mediterranean-Middle East War Zone Medal was a ribbon-only decoration; otherwise known as the Merchant Marine Mediterranean-Middle East War Zone Bar.

On May 19, 1992, the U.S. Department of Transportation announced the availability of new medals for civilian merchant seamen, in recognition of their service in World War II, Korea and Vietnam. The medals are being issued to supplement war zone ribbon bars previously awarded to civilian mariners who supported the nation's armed forces in these wars.

The new medal design consists of:

The shield and anchor symbolize a strong maritime service. The palms suggest the Mediterranean-Middle East area while denoting victory and achievement.

== See also ==
- Awards and decorations of the United States government
- Awards and Decorations of the United States Maritime Administration
- Awards and decorations of the United States Merchant Marine
- Awards and decorations of the United States military
- Coast and Geodetic Survey Atlantic War Zone Medal
- European–African–Middle Eastern Campaign Medal
