= Merchant Marine Atlantic War Zone Medal =

Decoration of the U.S. Merchant Marine

Merchant Marine Atlantic War Zone Medal (Bar)
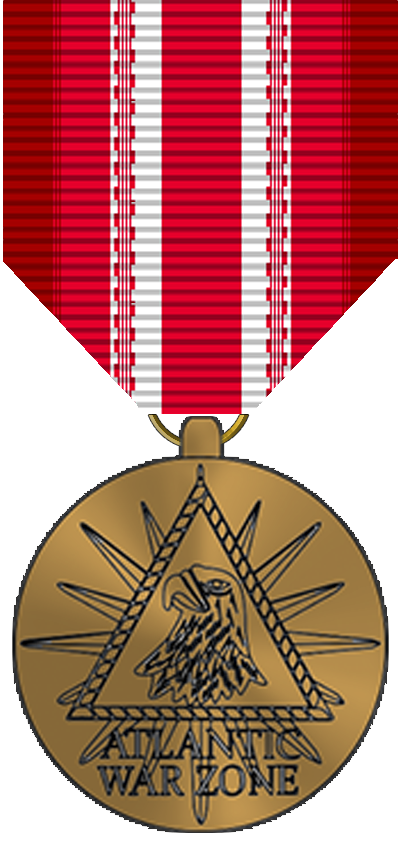
- Merchant Marine Atlantic War Zone Medal obverse (left) and reverse
- Type: Military medal
- Awarded for: Service in the Atlantic War Zone.
- Presented by: United States Maritime Administration
- Eligibility: Merchant Marine personnel
- Ribbon

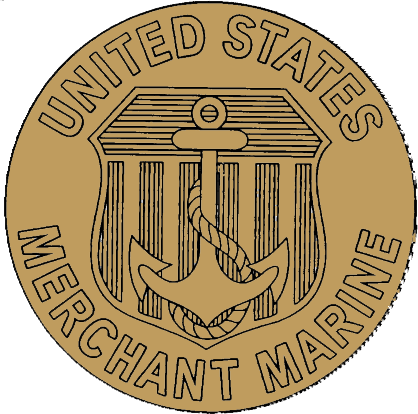
- Reverse
- Campaign: Second World War
- Established: 10 May 1944 as a ribbon bar 1992 as a medal

Highlights
- Total: 235,298

Precedence
- Next (higher): Merchant Marine Defense Bar
- Next (lower): Merchant Marine Mediterranean-Middle East War Zone Medal

The Merchant Marine Atlantic War Zone Medal (Bar) is a decoration of the United States Merchant Marine established by an Act of Congress on May 10, 1944.

== Conditions ==
The decoration is awarded to officers and men of ships operated by the War Shipping Administration for service in the Atlantic War Zone between December 7, 1941, and November 8, 1945. This theatre of operations comprised the North Atlantic Ocean, South Atlantic Ocean, Gulf of Mexico, Caribbean Sea, Barents Sea, and Greenland Sea.

== Design ==
Prior to 1992, the Merchant Marine Atlantic War Zone Medal was a ribbon-only decoration; otherwise known as the Merchant Marine Atlantic War Zone Bar.

On May 19, 1992, the U.S. Department of Transportation announced the availability of new medals for civilian merchant seamen, in recognition of their service in World War II, Korea and Vietnam. The medals are being issued to supplement war zone ribbon bars previously awarded to civilian mariners who supported the nation's armed forces in these wars.

The new medal design consists of:

The compass rose is traditionally associated with maritime navigation and the superimposed triangle with duty and service other than in the Armed Forces. The eagle symbolizes the United States and freedom.

== See also ==
- Awards and decorations of the United States government
- Awards and Decorations of the United States Maritime Administration
- Awards and decorations of the United States Merchant Marine
- Awards and decorations of the United States military
- Coast and Geodetic Survey Atlantic War Zone Medal
- European–African–Middle Eastern Campaign Medal
