= USS Begor =

US Navy high speed transport

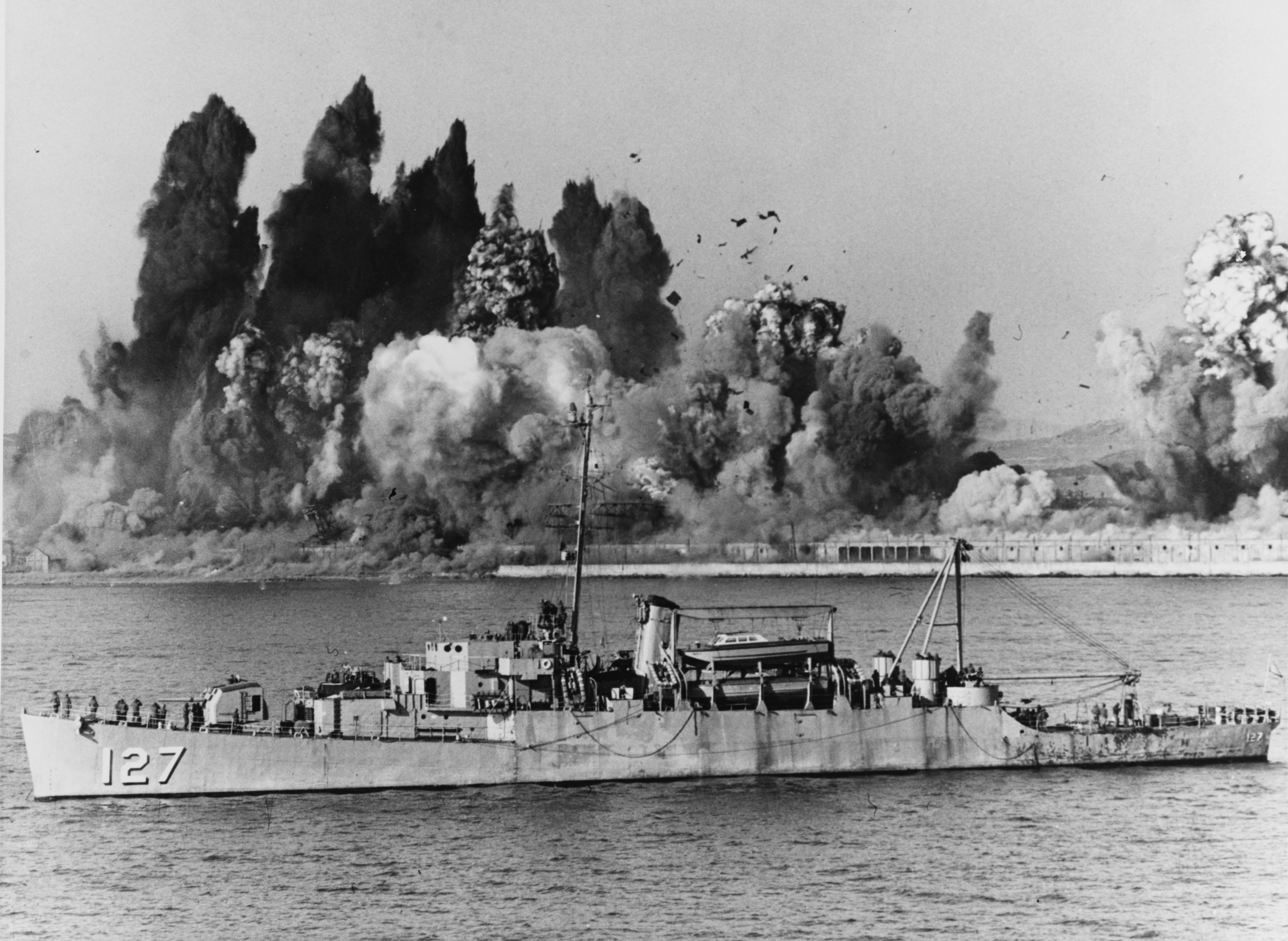
- USS Begor (APD-127) stands offshore during the evacuation and demolition of Hŭngnam, Korea, 24 December 1950.

History

United States
- Name: USS Begor
- Namesake: Fay B. Begor
- Ordered: 1942
- Builder: Defoe Shipbuilding Company, Bay City, Michigan
- Laid down: 6 March 1944
- Launched: 25 May 1944
- Commissioned: 14 March 1945
- Decommissioned: 20 July 1959
- Recommissioned: 20 November 1961
- Decommissioned: 13 July 1962
- Reclassified: LPR-127, 1 January 1969
- Stricken: 15 May 1975
- Honors and awards: 5 battle stars (Korea)
- Fate: Sold for scrap, 6 December 1976

General characteristics
- Class & type: Crosley-class high speed transport
- Displacement: 1,450 long tons (1,473 t)
- Length: 306 ft (93 m)
- Beam: 36 ft 10 in (11.23 m)
- Draft: 13 ft 6 in (4.11 m)
- Propulsion: 2 × Combustion Engineering DR boilers; Turbo-electric drive with 2 × General Electric steam turbines; 2 × solid manganese-bronze 3600 lb. 3-bladed propellers, 8 ft 6 in (2.59 m), 7 ft 7 in (2.31 m) pitch; 12,000 hp (8.9 MW); 2 rudders; 359 tons fuel oil
- Speed: 23 knots (43 km/h; 26 mph)
- Range: 3,700 nmi (6,900 km) at 15 kn (28 km/h; 17 mph); 6,000 nmi (11,000 km) at 12 kn (22 km/h; 14 mph)
- Boats & landing craft carried: 4 × LCVPs
- Troops: 162 troops
- Complement: 204 (12 officers, 192 enlisted)
- Armament: 1 × 5"/38 caliber gun; 3 × twin 40 mm guns; 6 × single 20 mm guns; 2 × depth charge tracks

USS Begor (DE-711/APD-127) was a Crosley-class high speed transport of the United States Navy.

== Namesake ==
Fay Broughton Begor was born on 15 October 1916 in Moriah, New York. He earned a bachelor's degree from Union College, Schenectady, New York, in June 1937. Earning his MD in May 1941, he began an internship at Montreal General Hospital on 1 July 1941; he served there as a resident intern in gynecology. Joining the Navy he received an appointment as assistant surgeon, with the rank of Lieutenant (junior grade) on 22 July 1942, completed his internship in Montreal on 1 August 1942, and executed his oath of office on 4 September 1942. Three days later he reported to the Third Naval District for active duty at the New York Navy Yard. A little less than a month later, on 3 October 1942, he was detached from the yard and transferred to the Landing Craft Group, Naval Operating Base, Norfolk, Virginia, for duty in Tank Landing Craft Flotilla 18, reporting for duty three days later. Detached on 6 April from his duty with Flotilla "A" he soon found himself en route to the receiving ship at San Francisco, then to Tank Landing Craft Group 22 in the Pacific and Infantry Landing Craft (LCI) Flotilla 7.

Begor was serving as the group's medical officer on board infantry landing craft LCI(L)-339 as it neared the beach in Operation Postern the landing of the 9th Australian Division on the beaches of the Huon Peninsula near Lae, New Guinea, on 4 September 1943. Japanese aircraft attacked the beachhead scoring multiple hits on LCI(L)-339. Begor immediately treated the wounded Australian soldiers until he was severely wounded in both thighs. He was transferred to LCI(L)-338, then ashore to the U.S. Army 87th Station Hospital at Buna and then on 7 September, to the tank landing ship LST-464 that had been configured to serve as a hospital ship. He died of his wounds on 9 September 1943. He was posthumously awarded the Navy Cross.

== Construction and commissioning ==
Begor was laid down by the Defoe Shipbuilding Company in Bay City, Michigan, as a Rudderow-class destroyer escort with the hull number DE-711. She was launched on 25 May 1944, sponsored by Mrs. F. B. Begor, widow of Lt.(jg) Begor. A few weeks after launching, on 17 July 1944, it was decided that Begor would be completed as a Crosley-class high speed transport, with the designation APD-127. She was commissioned on 14 March 1945.

== Service history ==
=== World War II, 1945 ===
Assigned to the Pacific Fleet, Begor arrived at Pearl Harbor on 30 May 1945. She arrived at Guam on 17 August after escorting convoys among the Marshall, Caroline, and Philippine Islands from June through August 1945. Departing 20 August with Underwater Demolition Team 21 embarked, she joined 3rd Fleet units en route to occupy Japan. Begor entered Sagami Wan on 27 August, and on the 30th, her frogmen reconnoitered the landing beaches over which the occupation forces landed the next day. Proceeding to Yokosuka Naval Dockyard, she assisted in the de-militarization of the vessels there, and made dock surveys until departing for the United States on 25 September. Begor arrived at San Diego, California on 21 October 1945.

=== 1945–1949 ===
The fast transport operated along the west coast until June 1946, when she sailed for Bikini Atoll to act as a drone control vessel during the "Operation Crossroads" atomic bomb tests. Begor returned in October, and during the next four years, carried out normal peacetime operations along the west coast, and made two cruises to the Far East from July 1947 through February 1948, and August through December 1949.

=== Korean War, 1950–1953 ===
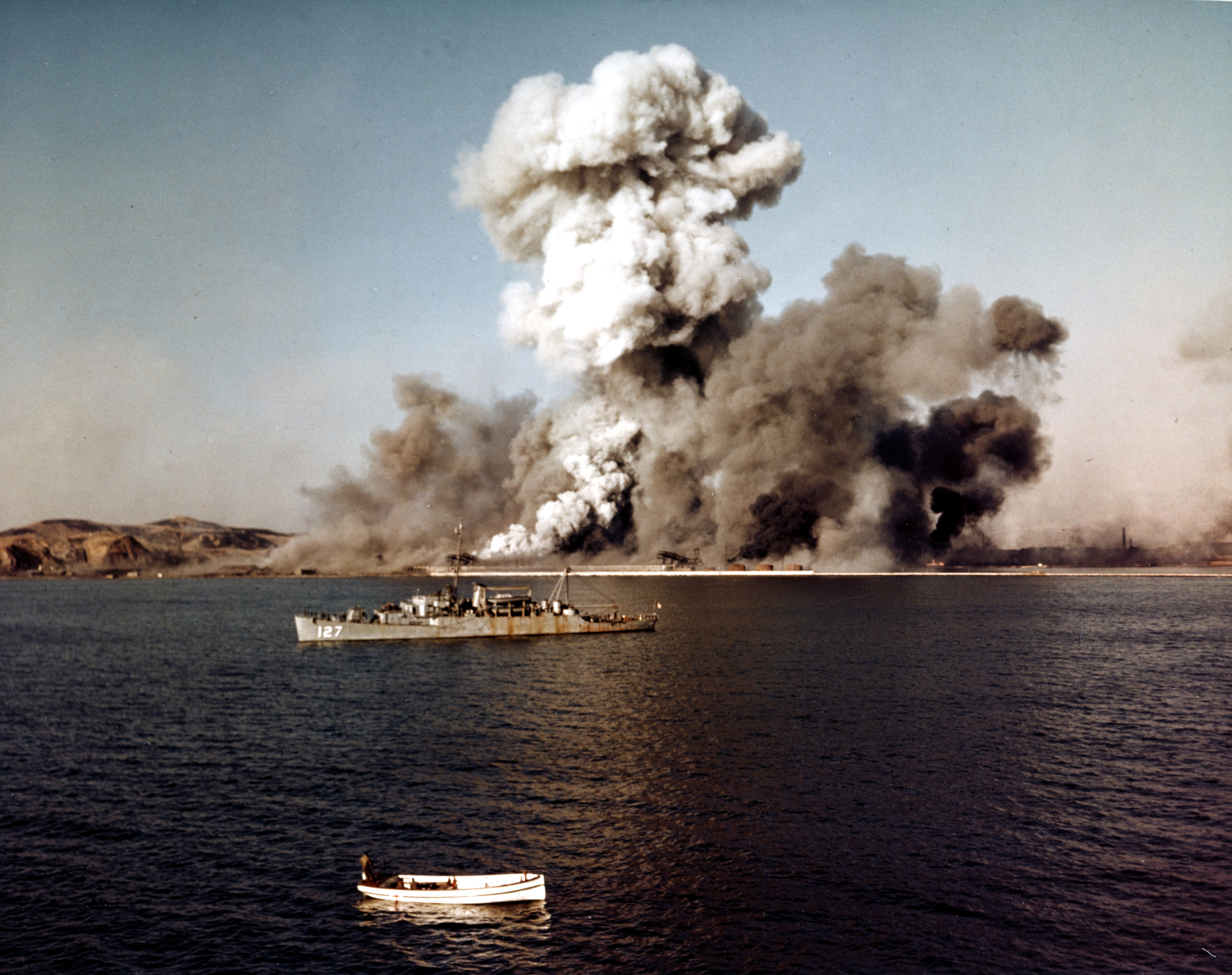
Begor (foreground) stands by off Hungnam, North Korea, as U.S. Navy and U.S. Army explosives teams destroy facilities and abandoned United Nations supplies in Hungnam on 24 December 1950, the last day of the amphibious evacuation of United Nations forces from Hungnam during the Korean War.

During the Korean War, Begor served two tours. The first tour, 7 December 1950 through September 1951, included participation in the Hungnam evacuation from 9 through 24 December, and the landing of Underwater Demolition Teams and British Commandos behind enemy lines for reconnaissance and demolition missions. On 7 April 1951, as part of Special Task Force 74, Begor along with destroyers Wallace L. Lind (DD-703), and Massey (DD-778), landing ship dock Fort Marion (LSD-22) and heavy cruiser Saint Paul (CA-73), helped to carry out raids on rail lines and tunnels utilizing 250 commandos of the 41 (Independent) Commando, Royal Marines. These highly successful and destructive raids slowed the enemy's resupply efforts, forcing the Communists to attempt to repair or rebuild the rail facilities by night while hiding the work crews and locomotives in tunnels by day. The second tour, from 14 November 1952 through 12 August 1953, consisted of patrol and UDT operations, as well as participation in the post-Armistice prisoner of war exchange.

=== 1954–1962 ===
After Korea, Begor continued alternating between the United States West Coast and the Far East. She made a Far Eastern cruise between July 1954 and March 1955, during which she participated in the Vietnamese "Operation Passage to Freedom", from 16 August through 30 September 1954.

Begor was decommissioned on 20 July 1959, and laid up in the Reserve Fleet. She was briefly put back in commission on 20 November 1961, then laid up again on 13 July 1962. On 1 January 1969 she was redesignated to Amphibious Transport, Small, LPR-127.

=== Decommissioning and sale ===
Begor was struck from the Naval Vessel Register on 15 May 1975, and on 6 December 1976 sold for scrapping for $60,000 to National Metal and Steel Corporation, Terminal Island, California.

== Awards ==
- Asiatic-Pacific Campaign Medal
- World War II Victory Medal
- Navy Occupation Medal with "ASIA" clasp
- National Defense Service Medal
- Korean Service Medal with five battle stars
- United Nations Korea Medal
