= Merchant Marine Defense Bar =

Merchant Marine Defense Medal (Bar)
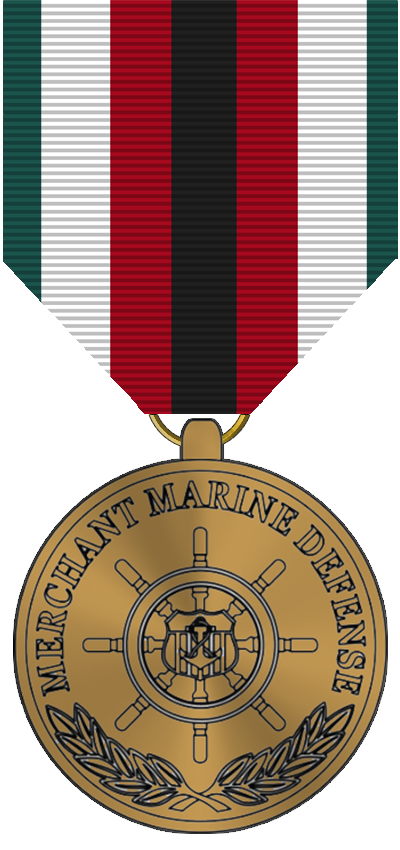
- Merchant Marine Defense Medal obverse (left) and reverse
- Type: Military medal Campaign medal
- Awarded for: Service between September 8, 1939 and December 7, 1941.
- Presented by: United States Maritime Administration
- Eligibility: Merchant Marine seamen
- Ribbon

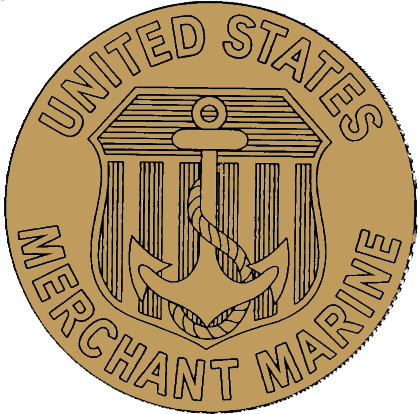
- Reverse
- Campaign: Second World War
- Established: August 24, 1944

Highlights
- Total: 17,091

Precedence
- Next (higher): Merchant Marine Combat Bar
- Next (lower): Merchant Marine Atlantic War Zone Medal

The Merchant Marine Defense Medal (Bar) is a decoration of the United States Merchant Marine. The decoration was established by an Act of Congress on August 14, 1944.

== Conditions ==
The decoration is awarded to members of the Merchant Marine who served aboard United States merchant ships between September 8, 1939 and December 7, 1941.

== Design ==
Prior to 1992, the Merchant Marine Defense Medal was a ribbon-only decoration; otherwise known as the Merchant Marine Defense Bar.

On May 19, 1992, the U.S. Department of Transportation announced the availability of new medals for civilian merchant seamen, in recognition of their service in World War II, Korea and Vietnam. The medals are being issued to supplement war zone ribbon bars previously awarded to civilian mariners who supported the nation's armed forces in these wars.

The new medal design consists of:

The shield and anchor, from the United States Maritime Service Seal, are superimposed in a ship's wheel, denoting control and maritime service. The laurel branches symbolize achievement and excellence.

== See also ==
- Awards and decorations of the United States government
- Awards and Decorations of the United States Maritime Administration
- Awards and decorations of the United States Merchant Marine
- Awards and decorations of the United States military
- American Defense Service Medal
- Coast and Geodetic Survey Defense Service Medal
