= Hungnam evacuation =

1950 evacuations during the Korean War

Hungnam Evacuation
- Part of the Korean War
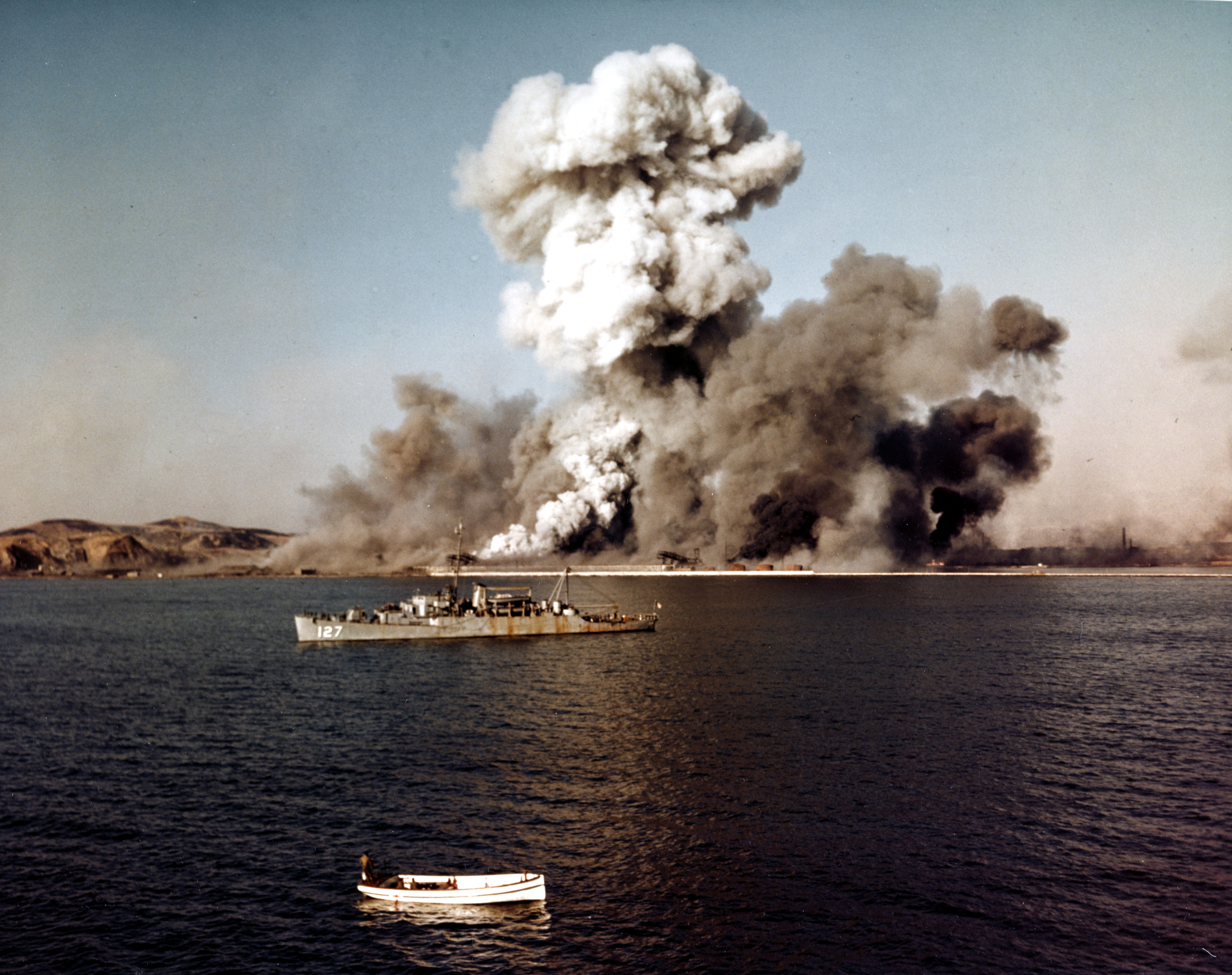
- Demolition charges destroy Hŭngnam port on 24 December 1950; USS Begor is in the foreground.
Date	15–24 December 1950
Location	South of Hamhung, Hamhung, North Korea
Result	Successful United Nations withdrawal

Belligerents
United Nations: United States; South Korea	North Korea; China

Commanders and leaders
(United Nations) Douglas MacArthur (United States) Edward Almond (First Republic of Korea) Shin Sung-Mo (United States) Earle E. Partridge (United States) James H. Doyle	(North Korea) Choi Yong-kun (North Korea) Kim Chaek (North Korea) Kim Ung (North Korea) Kim Mu Chong (China) Peng Dehuai

Units involved
(United States) X Corps: 1st Marine Division; 3rd Infantry Division; 7th Infantry Division; 1st Marine Air Wing; (First Republic of Korea) I Corps: 3rd Infantry Division; Capital Division; (United States) Fifth Air Force	(North Korea) Korean People's Army: 1st Division; 3rd Division; (China) People's Volunteer Army: 27th Army; 79th Division; 80th Division; 81st Division; 94th Division

Strength
100,000	Unknown

The Hungnam evacuation or Heungnam redeployment (Korean: 흥남 철수 작전; Hanja: 興南撤收作戰), also known as the Miracle of Christmas, was the evacuation of United Nations (UN) forces and North Korean civilians from the port of Hungnam, Hamhung, North Korea, between 15 and 24 December 1950, during the Korean War. As part of the fighting withdrawal of UN forces against the People's Volunteer Army (PVA) during the Battle of the Chosin Reservoir (27 November to 13 December), they abandoned some 59,000 square kilometers of North Korean territory to enemy forces and retreated to Hungnam, from where they were evacuated to South Korea.

== Background ==
On 8 December 1950, US X Corps commander General Edward Almond received UN Commander General Douglas MacArthur’s order to evacuate X Corps through Hungnam. Following the earlier decision to concentrate X Corps forces at Hungnam, the evacuation of Wonsan had begun on 3 December. In a week’s time, without interference from PVA or Korean People's Army (KPA) forces, the Regimental Combat Team 31 (RCT 31), US 3rd Infantry Division and a US 1st Marine Division shore party group totaling some 3,800 troops loaded themselves, 1,100 vehicles, 10,000 tons of other cargo, and 7,000 refugees aboard transport ships and LSTs provided by Admiral James H. Doyle’s Task Force 90.

One LST sailed north on the 9th to Hungnam, where its Marine shore party passengers were to take part in the forthcoming sealift. The remaining ships steamed for Pusan on the 9th and 10th. The Task Force 90 ships dispatched to Songjin on 5 December to pick up the tail-end troops of ROK I Corps meanwhile had reached their destination and by noon on 9 December had taken aboard the ROK 3rd Infantry Division (less the 26th Regiment, which withdrew to Hungnam as rearguard for the ROK 7th Infantry Division; the division headquarters, division artillery, and 18th Regiment of the ROK Capital Division; and some 4300 refugees. This sealift originally had been designed to assist X Corps’ concentration at Hungnam, but the intervening order to evacuate Hungnam changed the destination for most of the South Koreans to Pusan. On 10 and 11 December the convoy from Songjin anchored at Hungnam only long enough to unload the Capital Division's headquarters and artillery for employment in the perimeter and to take aboard an advance party of the ROK I Corps headquarters before proceeding to its new destination.

On the 11th, as the ROK from Songjin as well as the Marine and Army troops from the Chosin Reservoir came into Hungnam, the perimeter around the port consisted of a series of battalion and regimental strongpoints astride the likely avenues of PVA/KPA approach some 12–15 miles (19–24 km) outside the city. The US 3rd Infantry Division still held the large sector assigned to it when Almond first shaped the perimeter, from positions below Yonpo Airfield southwest of Hungnam to defenses astride the Chosin Reservoir road at Oro-ri (40.038°N 127.424°E) northwest of the port. Battalions of the US 7th Infantry Division stood in breadth and depth along the Pujon Reservoir (40.611°N 127.541°E) road north of Hungnam, and three regiments of ROK I Corps guarded approaches near and at the coast northeast of the port.

Although Almond had begun to pull these units into defenses around Hungnam at the beginning of December, PVA/KPA forces as of the 11th had not yet made any significant attempt to establish contact with the perimeter units. But Almond expected his beachhead defenses would be tested by PVA/KPA units approaching Hungnam along the coast from the northeast, from the Wonsan area to the south, and especially from the direction of the Chosin Reservoir. The likelihood that PVA/KPA forces pushing to the coast to reoccupy Wonsan would block the routes south of Hungnam had prompted Almond to discard any thought of an overland withdrawal to southern Korea (nor had MacArthur ordered such a move). Almond also considered the roads inadequate to permit the timely movement of large forces. His warning order, issued 9 December, alerted his forces for a "withdrawal by water and air without delay from Hungnam area to Pusan-Pohang-dong area." The larger exodus was to be by sea, with the Hungnam defenses contracting as Corps' forces were loaded, but airlift was to be employed for as long as Yonpo Airfield remained within the shrinking perimeter.

== Evacuation ==
=== Planning ===
In deciding how to evacuate his forces and still successfully defend his perimeter, Almond considered two alternatives. He could place all divisions on the perimeter and then withdraw portions of each simultaneously, or he could pull out one division at a time and spread his remaining forces to cover the vacated sector on a shorter front. Since some units were more battle worn than others, especially the 1st Marine Division, he elected the latter method and intended to ship the Marines first. They were to be followed by the 7th Division, then the 3rd Division. Almond planned to phase out ROK I Corps, X Corps' support units, bulk supplies and heavy equipment simultaneously with the US Army divisions. This was to be done carefully enough to keep a proper balance between combat and support troops and to ensure adequate logistical support. To maintain this balance yet guarantee that the evacuation proceeded as rapidly as possible, he established three points of control. From X Corps headquarters, his G-3 and G-4 together guided the dispatch of units to the beach. To supervise the actual loading of troops and materiel at water's edge, he organized a control group under Colonel Edward H. Forney, a Marine officer serving as Almond's deputy chief of staff. Under Forney's direction, the 2nd Engineer Special Brigade was to operate dock facilities, a reinforced Marine shore party company was to operate the LST and small craft beaches and control the lighterage for ships to be loaded in the harbor anchorages, and some five thousand Korean civilians were to work as stevedores. On the Navy's end of the out-loading procedure, Doyle, through a control unit aboard his flagship USS Mount McKinley, was to coordinate all shipments, assign anchorages, and issue docking and sailing instructions. Direct liaison was established between Almond's control group ashore and Doyle's control group at sea to match outgoing troops, supplies, and equipment with available ships. Almond also dispatched a control group under Lieutenant colonel Arthur M. Murray from Corps' headquarters to Pusan to receive troops, supplies, and equipment arriving by sea and air and to move them as rapidly as possible to assembly areas. Including the troops and materiel outloaded at Wonsan and Songjin, Almond needed shipping space for 105,000 troops, 18,422 vehicles, and some 350,000 tons of bulk cargo. Although Doyle commanded a transport group of over 125 ships, some would have to make more than one trip to meet Almond's needs. The Far East Air Forces’ Combat Cargo Command flying out of Yonpo Airfield was to fulfill airlift requirements. Tactical air support during the evacuation would be a Navy and Marine responsibility, the Fifth Air Force fighters previously located in northeastern Korea having flown out to Pusan on 3 December. The 1st Marine Air Wing, based at Yonpo and aboard escort carriers, was to devote its full effort to supporting the corps operation. In addition, Doyle was to arrange both naval air and naval gunfire support. Reinforced by ships supplied by Admiral Arthur Dewey Struble, the Seventh Fleet commander, Doyle eventually was able to employ seven carriers in throwing a canopy of aircraft over the Corps area and to deploy one battleship, two cruisers, seven destroyers, and three rocket ships in a maneuver area reaching 10 miles (16 km) north and south of Hungnam to answer Almond’s requests for gunfire support.

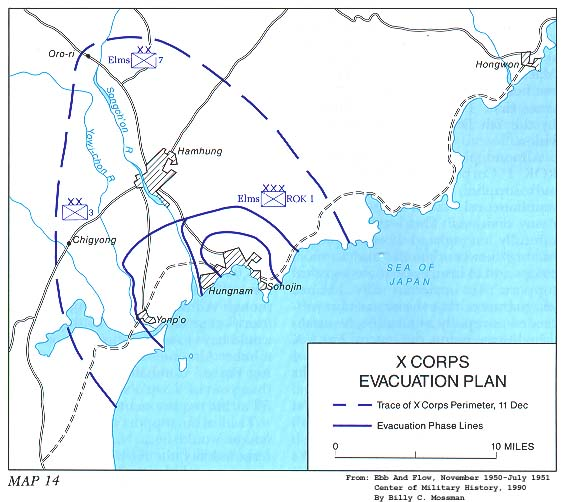
Map of X Corps' evacuation phase lines

To begin an orderly contraction of defenses as X Corps’ strength ashore diminished, the units on the perimeter were to withdraw deliberately as the 1st Marine Division embarked toward the first of three phase lines that Almond drew around Hungnam. In the southwest this first line rested generally along the Yowi-ch’on River, just below Yonpo Airfield and elsewhere traced an arc about 3 miles (4.8 km) from the heart of Hungnam. The second line differed from the first only in the southwest in the US 3rd Division sector where it followed the upper bank of the Songch’on River close by Hungnam. The 3rd Division's withdrawal to this second line, which would mean the abandonment of Yonpo Airfield, was scheduled to take place as the US 7th Division began its embarkation. The third and final line was a tight arc about 1 mile (1.6 km) outside the limits of Hungnam to be occupied by the 3rd Division as that division itself prepared to outload. During this final phase of the evacuation 3rd Division units were to use rearguard tactics to cover their own embarkation.

Almond published his formal evacuation order on 11 December, the date on which MacArthur visited Korea and flew into Yonpo Airfield for a conference with him. After briefing MacArthur on Corps' dispositions and the plan of evacuation, Almond predicted that the evacuation would be orderly, that no supplies or equipment would be destroyed or abandoned and that PVA/KPA forces would not interfere seriously. The redeployment of X Corps to southern Korea, he estimated, would be complete by 27 December.

=== The evacuation (12–24 December) ===
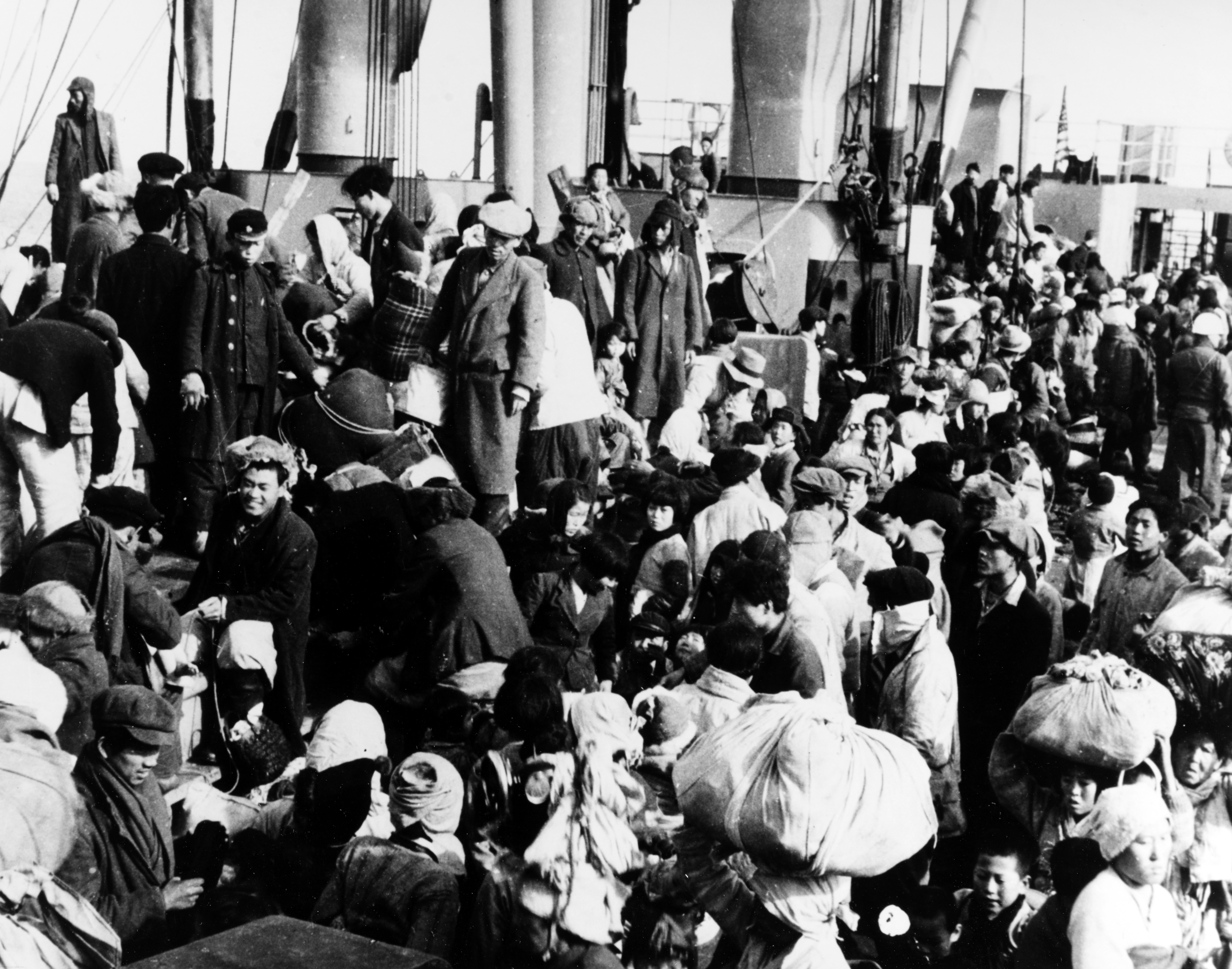
Refugees aboard SS Meredith Victory

The 1st Marine Division, as it came into Hungnam from the Chosin Reservoir on 11 December, assembled between the port and Yonpo Airfield. The division loaded over the following three days and sailed for Pusan at mid-morning on the 15th. Almond the day before had designated Masan, 30 miles (48 km) west of Pusan, as the division's assembly area. Following the voyage to Pusan and a motor march to Masan, the Marines passed to Eighth Army control on 18 December. Some bulk cargo was shipped out during the Marine loading, but the heavier evacuation of material began after the Marines sailed. From 15 December onwards service units gradually moved depots and supply points into the port area proper and the bulk supplies and heavy equipment were either loaded aboard ships double-banked at the docks or lightered to ships in the harbor. To save time, ammunition was loaded at the docks instead of well out into open water according to usual precautionary practice. This constant outward flow of material paralleled unit embarkations through the final day of the evacuation.

While the Marines departed by sea, the bulk of the 1st Korean Marine Corps Regiment, which had been attached to the 3rd Division, moved to Yonpo for evacuation by air. 3rd Division commander General Robert H. Soule had planned to compensate for the loss of the South Korean marines by pulling his division to the shorter first phase line on 16 December, but several sharp attacks against his positions between Chigyong and Oro-ri during the morning of the 15th prompted him to make his withdrawal that afternoon. By the 16th the attacks against the 3rd Division on the western and northwestern arcs of the perimeter, enemy patrols engaged ROK I Corps in the northeast, and other ground and air reports indicated that PVA/KPA forces were closing in around the X Corps perimeter but not in great strength. Parts of the PVA 81st Division, 27th Army, appeared to have made the attacks on the 3rd Division and a KPA brigade apparently was moving toward Hungnam over the coastal road from the northeast. A greater immediate problem than the approach of relatively few enemy forces was a mass movement of civilians toward the corps perimeter. Although Almond had planned to evacuate government officials, their families and as many others as shipping space allowed, he had not anticipated that thousands of civilians would try to reach Hungnam. Besides hampering evacuation operations by overcrowding the port area, the large refugee movement posed a danger of PVA/KPA infiltration. According to Corps' intelligence sources, the North Koreans were circulating a rumor in Hamhung that X Corps would provide transportation for all civilians who wished to leave North Korea. The intention was to create a mass move to cover the infiltration of KPA agents and saboteurs. To prevent overcrowding and infiltration, military police, intelligence agents, and perimeter troops attempted to block civilian entry, particularly over the Hamhung-Hungnam road, which carried the larger number of refugees. They were only partially successful. Those civilians already in Hungnam and those who managed to reach the city were screened, then moved to the southeastern suburb of Sohojin, where Corps' civil affairs personnel distributed food and organized them for evacuation as shipping space became available.

On the heels of the Marine division, the US 7th Division began to load on 14 December, embarking first the worn troops of the 31st Infantry Regiment, 1st Battalion, 32nd Infantry Regiment and the 57th Field Artillery Battalion, who had been with the Marines in the Chosin Reservoir area. Most of the 7th Division's service units went aboard ship on the 15th and 16th. The US 17th Infantry Regiment and remainder of the 32nd Infantry Regiment meanwhile relieved ROK I Corps on the perimeter and withdrew to the first phase line. Hence, the Corps' perimeter on the 16th was divided into two nearly equal parts by the Songch’on River, the 7th Division in position above it, the 3rd Division holding the sector below. Patrols and outposts deepened the defense as far out as the lower edge of Hamhung.

Naval gunfire support operations began on 15 December, when the heavy cruiser USS Saint Paul opened up with her main and secondary armament on North Korean positions. On 17 December USS Rochester took its turn, while on the 21st North Korean troops became the target of the LSMR rocket ships. On Christmas Eve, the 16 in guns of the battleship USS Missouri joined the action. There was a heavy expenditure of ammunition.

After being relieved by the 7th Division, ROK I Corps loaded and sailed at noon on 17 December. Although original plans called for the ROK to go to Pusan, MacArthur, apparently as a result of his 11 December visit to Korea, had directed that the Corps' units then on the Hungnam perimeter be sea lifted to Samch’ok. These units and those being carried to Pusan from Songjin were to pass to Eighth Army control upon disembarkation. This transfer would permit Eighth Army commander General Walton Walker to deploy ROK I Corps immediately, and the landing at Samch’ok would put much of it close at hand for deployment at the eastern end of his proposed Line B. The landing, actually made at a small port just north of Samch’ok, was completed on 20 December. ROK I Corps’ departure on the 17th coincided with the evacuation of most X Corps' headquarters sections and troops. Their final destination was Kyongju, 50 miles (80 km) north of Pusan, where they were to establish an advance Corps' command post. On the same day, operations at Yonpo Airfield closed as the left flank units of the 3rd Division prepared to withdraw to the lower bank of the Songch’on River behind the field the next day. The Marine squadrons that had used the field already had withdrawn to Pusan and Itami Air Base, Japan. Last to leave was a Fifth Air Force base unit that had serviced the Marine fighters and General William H. Tunner’s cargo aircraft. By the closing date Tunner's planes had lifted out 3,600 troops, 196 vehicles, 1,300 tons of cargo, and several hundred refugees.

The 18 December withdrawal of Soule's left flank units to the lower bank of the Songch’on River was a preliminary move in the 3rd Division's relief of the two 7th Division regiments still on the perimeter. Soule's forces stepped behind the Songch’on to the second Corps' phase line on the 19th and on the 19th and 20th spread out to relieve the 17th and 32nd Regiments. Almond closed his command post in Hungnam on the 20th and reopened it aboard USS Mount McKinley in the harbor, leaving Soule in command of ground troops ashore. PVA/KPA probing attacks, which had slackened noticeably after the 3rd and 7th Divisions withdrew to the first Corps' phase line, picked up again on the 18th and became still more intense on the following day. Three PVA divisions, the 79th, 80th and 81st, all from the 27th Army, were believed to be in the nearby ground west of Hungnam, although only the 79th was currently in contact. North and northeast of Hungnam, a KPA brigade and the reconstituted KPA 3rd Division had been encountered, as had another KPA force, presumably a regiment. None of the PVA/KPA strikes on the perimeter did more than penetrate some outposts, and counterattacks rapidly eliminated these gains. So far, all action appeared to be only an attempt to reconnoiter the perimeter. Several explanations for the PVA/KPA's failure to make a larger effort were plausible. The bulk of the PVA in the Chosin Reservoir area apparently were taking time to recuperate from losses suffered in the cold weather and recent battles. All PVA/KPA forces undoubtedly were aware that X Corps was evacuating Hungnam and that they would be able to enter the city soon without having to fight their way in. The contraction of the Corps' perimeter probably forced the PVA/KPA to repeat their reconnaissance. Artillery fire, naval gunfire, and ample close air support may well have prevented the PVA/KPA from concentrating sufficient strength for strong attacks. Whatever the reasons, PVA/KPA forces had not yet launched a large-scale assault. Although an additional unit, a regiment of the KPA 1st Division, was identified near the northeastern anchor of the Corps' perimeter on 20 December, PVA/KPA attacks diminished on the 20th and 21st as the last troops of the 7th Division embarked and sailed for Pusan. 7th Division completed their redeployment on the 27th and moved into an assembly around Yongch’on, west of the new X Corps headquarters at Kyongju. New but still small attacks harassed the 3rd Division on 22 December as Soule's 7th, 65th and 15th Infantry Regiments from west to east stood at the second Corps' phase line to cover the loading of the last Corps' artillery units and the first of the division's service units. On the 23rd, when Soule pulled his regiments to the last Corps' phase line in preparation for the final withdrawal from Hungnam, only a small amount of mortar and artillery fire struck the perimeter troops. Whatever conditions so far had kept the PVA/KPA from opening a large assault continued even after the X Corps’ perimeter strength dwindled to a single division. The indirect fire received on the 23rd proved to be the last opposition offered.

By morning of the 24th the perimeter was silent and remained so as the last of the 3rd Division's service units loaded and as Soule started his rearguard action to take out his regiments and artillery. A battalion from each regiment stayed on the perimeter while the remaining infantry and the artillery outloaded and while the Division's 10th Engineer Combat Battalion and Navy underwater demolition teams prepared port facilities for destruction. At the same time, the last Corps' supplies, the port operating units, and as many of the remaining refugees as possible were put aboard ship. After Almond made a final inspection ashore, seven platoons established strongpoints near the beaches to protect the embarkation of the remainder of the covering battalions and the bulk of the 10th Engineer Combat Battalion. In the final steps, Doyle's warships laid down a wide barrage about 1.5 miles (2.4 km) inland as the last platoons of the covering force loaded and as the 10th Engineer Combat Battalion and Navy demolition teams blew up the port before leaving the beaches aboard LVTs and LCMs shortly after 14:30.

By Christmas Eve the ships carrying the last X Corps troops and supplies were well out of Hungnam harbor en route to Pusan and Ulsan, a small port 30 miles (48 km) north of Pusan. They left behind no serviceable equipment or usable supplies. About 200 tons of ammunition, a similar amount of frozen dynamite, 500 thousand-pound aerial bombs and about 200 drums of oil and gasoline had not been taken out, but all of this [had] "added to the loudness of the final blowup of the port of Hungnam."

== Aftermath ==
In retrospect, the evacuation of X Corps from Hungnam had proved successful as a logistical exercise. While the move could be considered a withdrawal from a hostile shore, neither PVA nor KPA forces had made any serious attempts to disrupt the operation or even to test the shrinking perimeter that protected the loading. Logistical rather than tactical matters therefore had governed the rate of the evacuation. Indeed, X Corps’ redeployment south had been a matter of how rapidly Doyle's ships could be loaded.

A remarkable number of refugees, over 86,000, had been lifted out of Hungnam. Including those evacuated from Wonsan and Songjin, the total number of civilians taken out of northeastern Korea reached 98,100. About the same number had been left behind for lack of shipping space. The evacuation included 14,000 refugees who were transported on one ship, the SS Meredith Victory—the largest evacuation from land by a single ship. This was made possible by a declaration of national emergency by President Truman issued on 16 December 1950 with Presidential Proclamation No. 2914, 3 C.F.R. 99 (1953). Among the civilians evacuated and brought to the South were the future parents of former South Korean President Moon Jae-in. Five babies were born on the ships and were nicknamed Kimchi 1–5 by US sailors.

== In popular culture ==
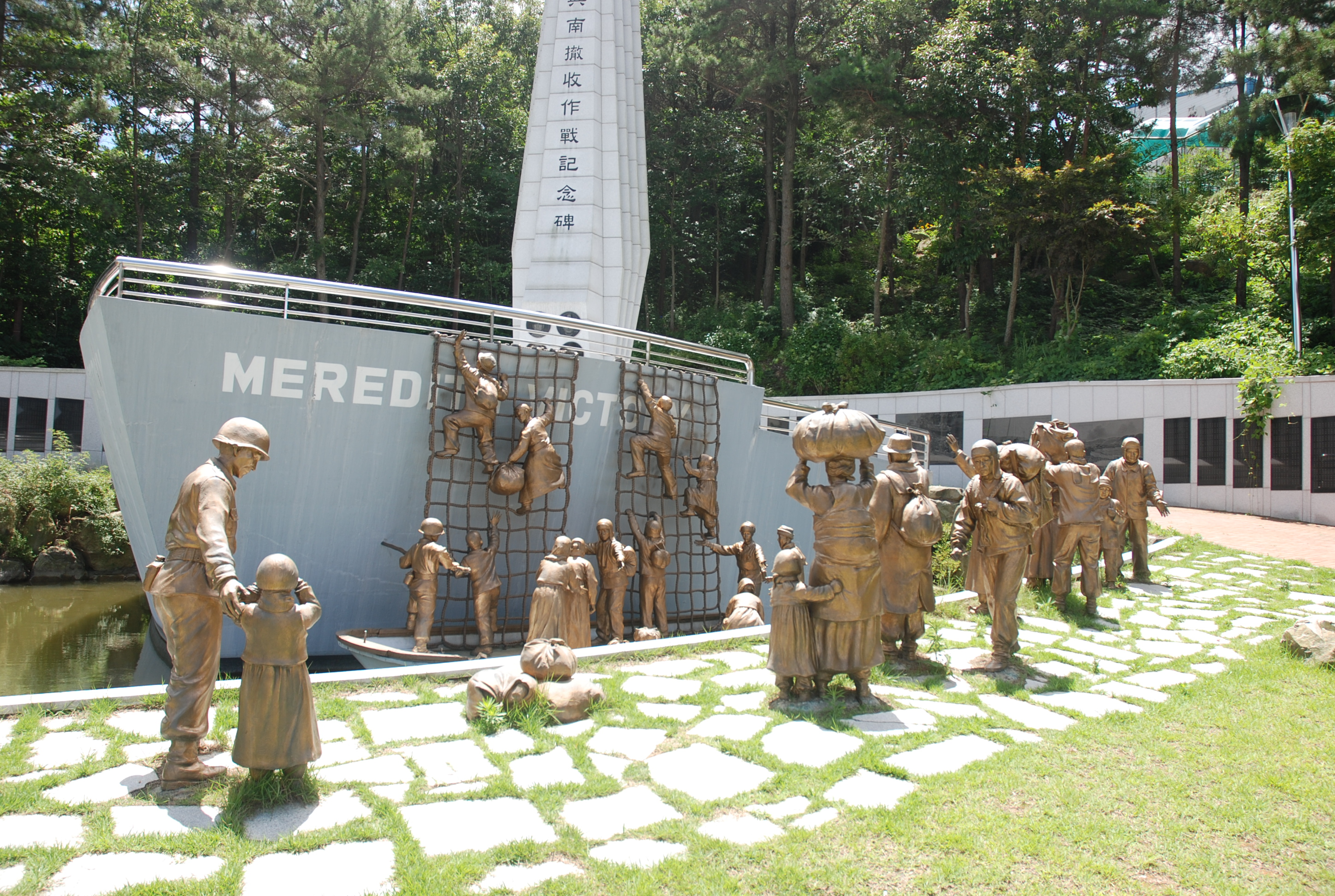
Hungnam Evacuation memorial at Geoje POW camp.

- Heungnam That I Saw Last (1984)
- A film about the Hungnam evacuation entered pre-production in 2005 but did not push through.
- The 2014 film Ode to My Father depicts the Hungnam evacuation in its beginning.
- Timeless episode "The Miracle of Christmas: Part II" covers the event.

== See also ==
- Leonard LaRue
- Korean War
