= Hungnam =

District of Hamhung, North Korea

Coordinates: 39°50′N 127°36′E

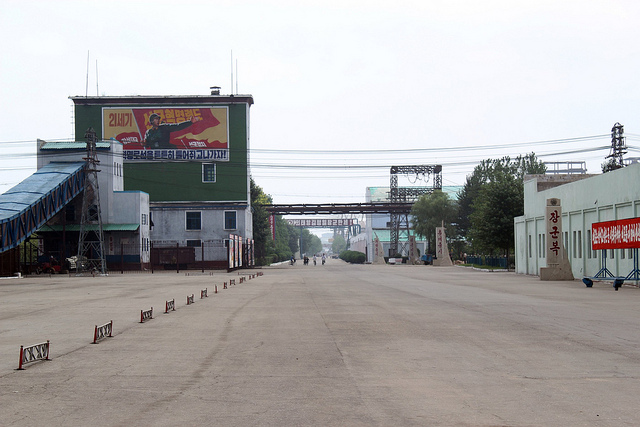
- Inside the Hungnam Fertilizer Complex

Korean name
- Hangul: 흥남구역
- Hanja: 興南區域
- RR: Heungnam-guyeok
- MR: Hŭngnam-guyŏk

Hŭngnam (Korean: 흥남) is a district of Hamhung, the second largest city in North Korea. It is a port city on the eastern coast on the Korean East Sea (Sea of Japan). It is only 13 kilometres (8 mi) from the slightly inland city of Hamhung. In 2005, the former city became a ward of Hamhung.

== History ==
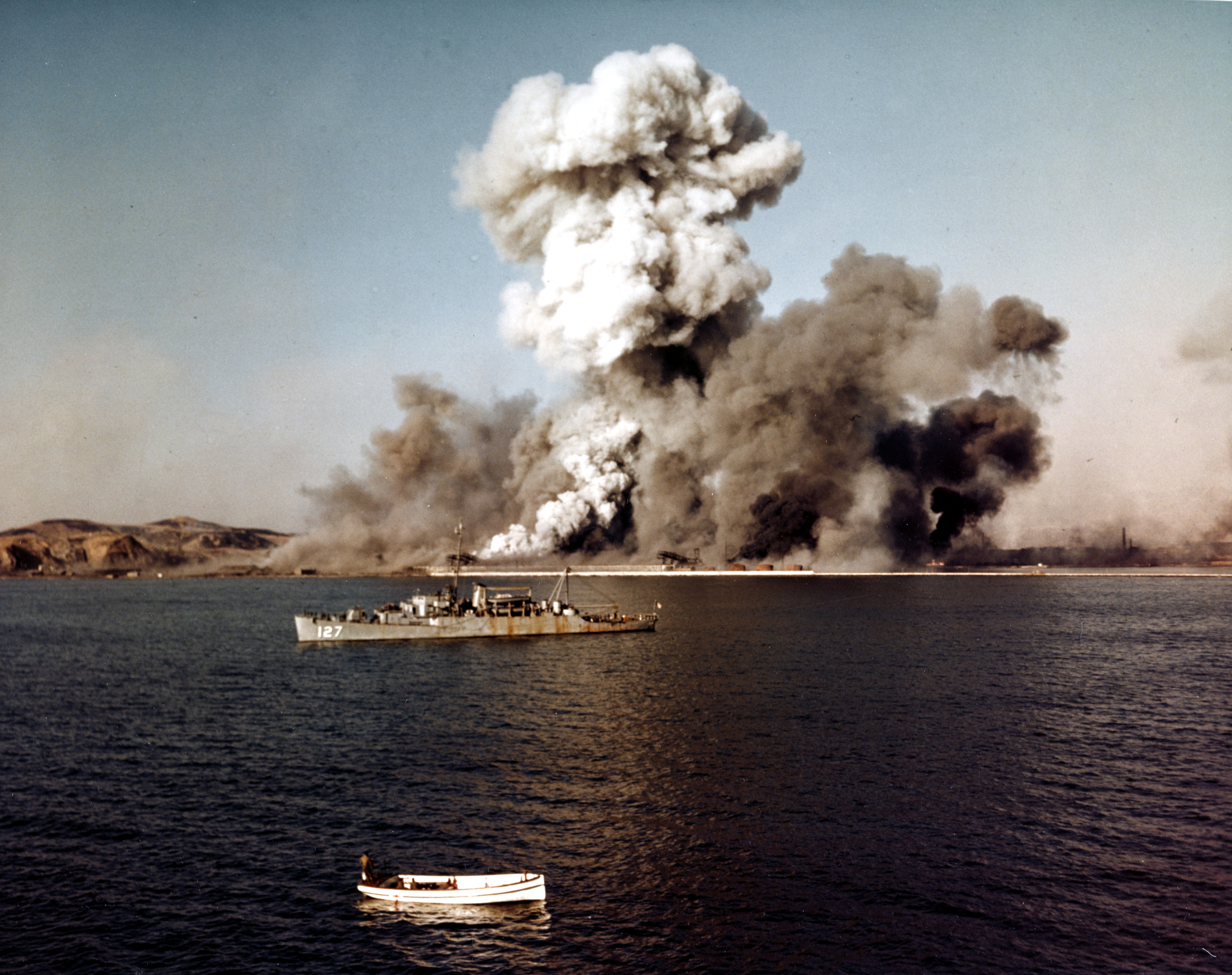
U.S. Navy and U.S. Army explosives teams destroy facilities and abandoned United Nations supplies in Hŭngnam on 24 December 1950, the last day of the amphibious evacuation of U.N. forces from Hŭngnam during the Korean War. The U.S. Navy high-speed transport USS Begor (APD-127) stands by in the foreground.

The port at Hŭngnam was the site of the Hŭngnam evacuation, a major evacuation of both United Nations military and North Korean civilians during the Korean War in late December 1950. Approximately 100,000 troops and material and 100,000 civilians were loaded onto a variety of merchant ships and military transports totaling 193 shiploads over the weeks leading up to Christmas 1950, and were transported to safety in Pusan and other destinations in South Korea. The evacuation included 14,000 refugees who were transported on one ship, the SS Meredith Victory - the largest evacuation from land by a single ship. This was made possible by a declaration of national emergency by President Truman issued on 16 December 1950 with Presidential Proclamation No. 2914, 3 C.F.R. 99 (1953). This operation was the culmination of the Battle of Chosin Reservoir, in which the embattled UN troops fought their way out of a Chinese trap.

In late 2005, Hŭngnam was demoted from Hŭngnam-si (Hŭngnam City) to Hŭngnam-kuyok (Hŭngnam District) within Hamhung-si.

== Population ==
The population has been estimated at (variously) 200,000 or 450,000; the official North Korean population figure is 700,000 but this is disputed.

== Economy ==
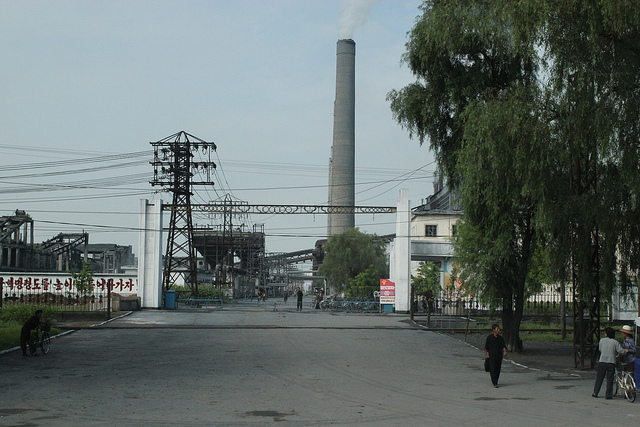
The entrance of the February 8 Vinylon Complex

The city is home to the Hungnam Fertilizer Complex, which has allegedly also been used to manufacture chemical weapons. Other industrial facilities include the February 8 Vinylon Factory Complex which allegedly is producing UDMH fuel used for liquid fueled rocket and missiles. It is also home to Hungnam Chemical Engineering College.

== Transport ==
Hungnam Station is on the Pyongra Line railway.

== Administrative divisions ==
Hŭngnam is divided into 43 tong (neighbourhoods), 1 rodongjagu (workers' district) and 5 ri (villages):

- Chakto-dong
- Ch'ŏn'gi-dong
- Hadŏk-tong
- Hojŏn-dong
- Honam-dong
- Hŭisil-dong
- Hŭngbuk-tong
- Hŭngdŏk 1-dong
- Hŭngdŏk 2-dong
- Hŭngdŏk 3-dong
- Hŭngdŏk 4-dong
- Hŭngsŏ-dong
- Hunong-dong
- Kŭmbit-tong
- Naeho-dong
- P'unghŭng-dong
- Ryong'am-dong
- Ryongsin-dong
- Ryongsŏng 1-dong
- Ryongsŏng 2-dong
- Ryongyŏn-dong
- Ryŏnmot-tong
- Ryujŏng 1-dong
- Ryujŏng 2-dong
- Ryujŏng 3-dong
- Saemmul-dong
- Sangsu-dong
- Sŏho 1-dong
- Sŏho 2-dong
- Sonam-dong
- Songhŭng-dong
- Songsam-dong
- Subyŏn-dong
- Tŏk-tong
- Tŏkp'ung-dong
- Ŭnbit-tong
- Ŭndŏk-tong
- Ŭngbong 1-dong
- Ŭngbong 2-dong
- Unjung 1-dong
- Unjung 2-dong
- Unsŏng 1-dong
- Unsŏng 2-dong
- Choul-lodongjagu
- Ch'anghŭng-ri
- Majŏl-li
- P'ungdong-ri
- Saemaul-li
- Sudo-ri

== See also ==
- Hungnam evacuation
- List of cities in North Korea
- Geography of North Korea
