= Merchant Marine Combat Bar =

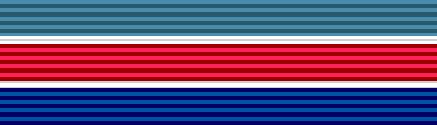
- Merchant Marine Combat Bar
- Type: Individual Award
- Awarded for: Under enemy attack
- Presented by: United States Maritime Administration
- Campaign: Second World War
- Status: No longer issued
- Established: May 10, 1943

Highlights
- Total: 114,145

Precedence
- Next (higher): Merchant Marine Mariner's Medal
- Next (lower): Merchant Marine Defense Bar

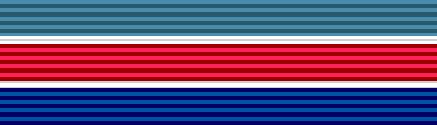

The Merchant Marine Combat Bar was a decoration of the United States Merchant Marine. The decoration was established by an Act of Congress on 10 May 1943.

== Conditions ==
The decoration was awarded to members of the Merchant Marine who served on a ship when it was attacked or damaged by an enemy or an instrument of war, such as a mine during the Second World War. This award is a ribbon bar only. Further prescribed is the issuance of a silver star to be attached to such a bar to seamen who are forced to abandon ship when it is so attacked or damaged. For each additional abandonment, an additional star is attached. It is no longer awarded.

== See also ==
- Awards and decorations of the United States government
- Awards and Decorations of the United States Maritime Administration
- Awards and decorations of the United States Merchant Marine
- Awards and decorations of the United States military
