= Merchant Marine Pacific War Zone Medal =

Decoration of the U.S. Merchant Marine

Merchant Marine Pacific War Zone Medal (Bar)
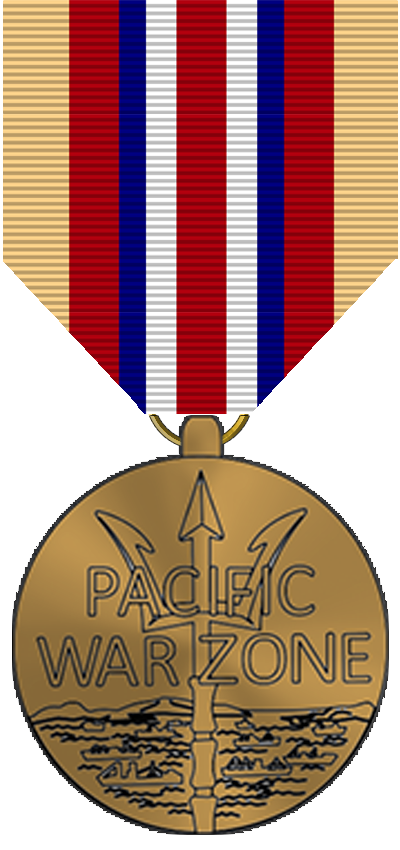
- Merchant Marine Pacific War Zone Medal obverse (left) and reverse
- Type: Military medal
- Awarded for: Service in the Pacific War Zone.
- Presented by: United States Maritime Administration
- Eligibility: Merchant Marine seamen.
- Ribbon

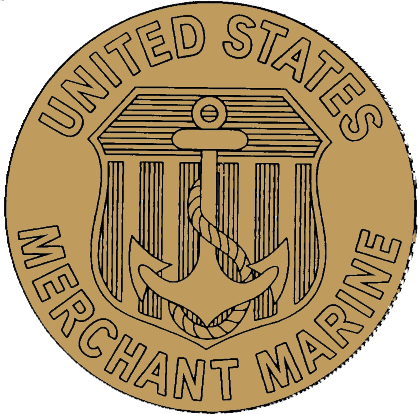
- Reverse
- Campaign: Second World War
- Established: May 10, 1944

Highlights
- Total: 177,926

Precedence
- Next (higher): Merchant Marine Mediterranean-Middle East War Zone Medal
- Next (lower): Merchant Marine World War II Victory Medal

The Merchant Marine Pacific War Zone Medal (Bar) is a decoration of the United States Merchant Marine established by an Act of Congress on May 10, 1944.

== Conditions ==
The decoration is awarded to officers and men of ships operated by the War Shipping Administration for service in the Pacific War Zone between December 7, 1941, to March 2, 1946. This theatre of operations comprised the North Pacific, South Pacific, and the Indian Ocean east of 80 degrees east longitude.

== Design ==
Prior to 1992, the Merchant Marine Pacific War Zone Medal was a ribbon-only decoration; otherwise known as the Merchant Marine Pacific War Zone Bar.

On May 19, 1992, the U.S. Department of Transportation announced the availability of new medals for civilian merchant seamen, in recognition of their service in World War II, Korea and Vietnam. The medals are being issued to supplement war zone ribbon bars previously awarded to civilian mariners who supported the nation's armed forces in these wars.

The new medal design consists of:

The trident, a symbol of naval prowess, rests upon a shaft of bamboo denoting the Pacific theatre of operations. The sea seascape suggests maritime activities and service

== See also ==
- Awards and decorations of the United States government
- Awards and Decorations of the United States Maritime Administration
- Awards and decorations of the United States Merchant Marine
- Awards and decorations of the United States military
- Coast and Geodetic Survey Pacific War Zone Medal
- Asiatic–Pacific Campaign Medal
