= Merchant Marine Distinguished Service Medal =

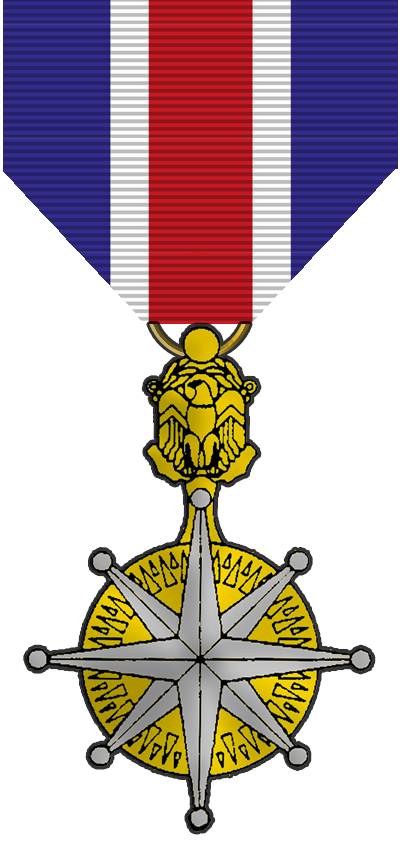
- Obverse and reverse of the medal
- Type: Military medal Distinguished service medal
- Awarded for: Outstanding conduct or service in the line of duty.
- Presented by: United States Maritime Administration
- Eligibility: Merchant Marine seamen
- Ribbon

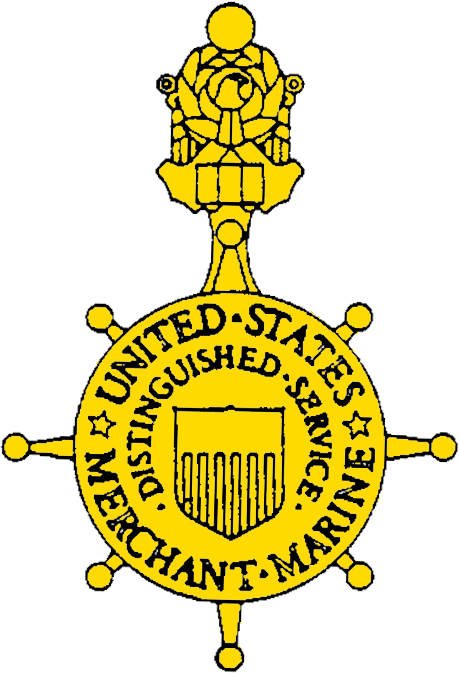
- Reverse
- Established: April 11, 1942

Highlights
- Total: 152
- Total awarded posthumously: 30

Precedence
- Next (lower): Merchant Marine Meritorious Service Medal

The Merchant Marine Distinguished Service Medal is a decoration of the United States Merchant Marine (USMM). The decoration is the highest award which can be bestowed upon members of that service. It is awarded to any seaman in the USMM who, on or after September 3, 1939, has distinguished himself during the war by outstanding conduct or service in the line of duty. Regulations state that not more than one medal shall be issued to any one seaman, but for each succeeding instance sufficient to justify the award of a medal, there will be awarded a suitable insignia to be worn with the medal.

As the Merchant Marine Distinguished Service Medal is considered a federal service decoration, it may be worn on the uniforms of active, reserve, and retired uniformed service members.

== Design notes and description ==
Designed by Paul Manship, subsequent awards of the medal are represented by 5/16th inch gold stars affixed to both the suspension ribbon and the ribbon bar. Original awards have P. M. on the reverse of the suspension device.

The medal is in gold-plate with a diameter of 41.9mm. It is composed of a silver 8-point ball tip star superimposed on a gold compass with a square eagle-anchor suspension device. The ribbon is blue, white, red, white, blue.

== Recipients ==
=== United States Merchant Marine Academy awardees ===
The first medal was awarded to Edwin F. Cheney on October 8, 1942, by Franklin D. Roosevelt at the White House with Admiral Emery S. Land as documented by Lowell Thomas in his book These Men Shall Never Die.

- Captain Paul Buck
- Midshipman Francis A. Dales
- Midshipman Elmer C. Donnelly
- Midshipman Edwin Joseph O'Hara - awarded posthumously
- Midshipman Walter G. Sittmann
- Midshipman William M. Thomas Jr.
- Midshipman Phil Cox Vannais
- Midshipman Frederick R. Zito
- Midshipman Carl M. Medved
- Third Mate Edward Michael Fetherston
- Third Mate Michael J. Hainen, September 1991

=== SS Mayaguez incident ===
- First Officer Clinton Harriman
- Third Officer Karl Lonsdale
- Yeoman Storekeeper Robert Griffin,
- 2nd Asst. Engineer Michael Saltwick
- Fireman Watertender Hermino Rivera
- Oiler Epifanio Rodriguez

In addition, the above six Mariners were also awarded the Navy Distinguished Civilian Service Award.

=== Other awardees ===
- Captain Elis R. Johanson
- Third Officer Frederick August Larsen Jr.
- Chief Engineer Albert M. Boe
- Chief Engineer Thomas J. McTaggart
- Radio Operator Kenneth W. Maynard
- Master Paul H. Browne

== See also ==
- Awards and decorations of the United States government
- Awards and Decorations of the United States Maritime Administration
- Awards and decorations of the United States Merchant Marine
- Awards and decorations of the United States Armed Forces
- Distinguished service medal
- Coast and Geodetic Survey Distinguished Service Medal
- Coast Guard Distinguished Service Medal
- Distinguished Service Medal (U.S. Air and Space Forces)
- Distinguished Service Medal (U.S. Army)
- Navy Distinguished Service Medal
