= Merchant Marine Meritorious Service Medal =

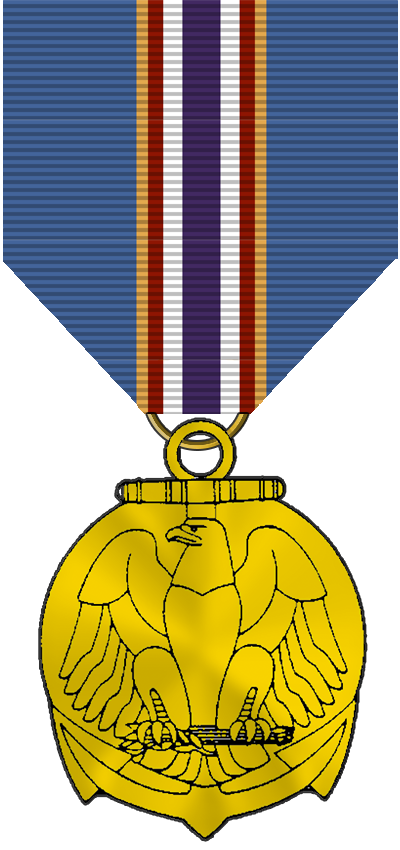
- Obverse and reverse of the medal
- Type: Military medal
- Awarded for: Conduct of a meritorious nature, but not sufficient to warrant the Merchant Marine Distinguished Service Medal
- Presented by: United States Maritime Administration
- Ribbon

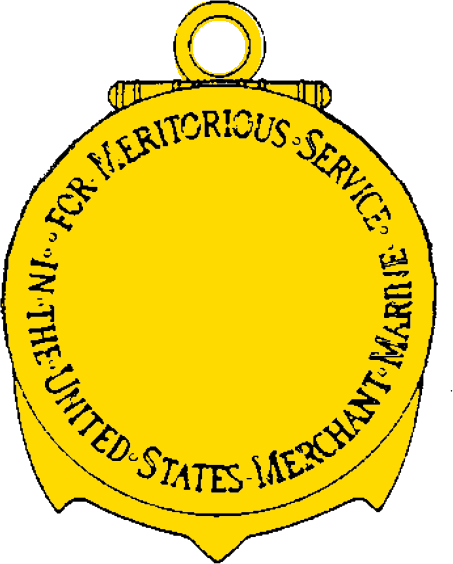
- Reverse
- Status: Still issued
- Established: Executive Order 9472, August 29, 1944 (as amended by E.O. 9692, Feb. 5, 1946);

Highlights
- Total: 521

Precedence
- Next (higher): Merchant Marine Distinguished Service Medal
- Next (lower): Merchant Marine Gallant Ship Citation Ribbon

The Merchant Marine Meritorious Service Medal is a decoration of the United States Merchant Marine. It is awarded to any seamen of any ship operated by or for the War Shipping Administration who is commended by the Administrator for conduct or service of a meritorious nature, but not sufficient to warrant the Merchant Marine Distinguished Service Medal. Regulations state that not more than one medal shall be issued to any one seaman, but for each succeeding instance sufficient to justify the award of a medal, there will be awarded a suitable insignia to be worn with the medal.

As the Merchant Marine Meritorious Service Medal is considered a federal service decoration, it may be worn on the uniforms of active, reserve, and retired uniformed service members.

== Design notes ==
Designed by Paul Manship, subsequent awards of the medal are represented by 5/16th inch gold stars affixed to both the suspension ribbon and the ribbon bar.

== See also ==
- Awards and decorations of the United States government
- Awards and decorations of the United States Maritime Administration
- Awards and decorations of the United States Merchant Marine
- Awards and decorations of the United States military
- Meritorious Service Medal
- Coast and Geodetic Survey Meritorious Service Medal
