= Maritime history of the United States (1900–1999) =

Part of American maritime history

The United States merchant marine forces matured during the maritime history of the United States (1900–1999).

== 1900s, first decade ==
In 1905, the Industrial Workers of the World (IWW, or "the Wobblies") was founded, representing mainly unskilled workers. "The Wobblies", a force in American labor only for about 15 years, were largely routed by the Palmer Raids after World War I. In 1908, Andrew Furuseth became president of the International Seamen's Union and served in that office until 1938.

== 1910s ==
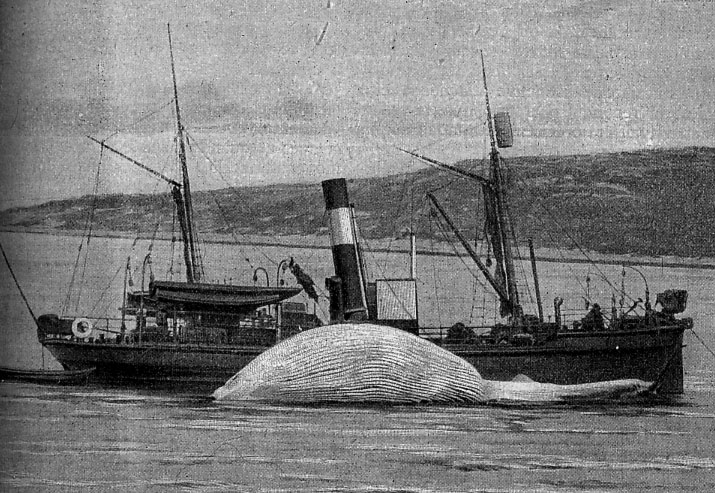
A steamship cleaning a whale, circa 1900.

On March 25, 1901, Harry Lundeberg was born. On March 1, 1906, Joseph Curran was born.

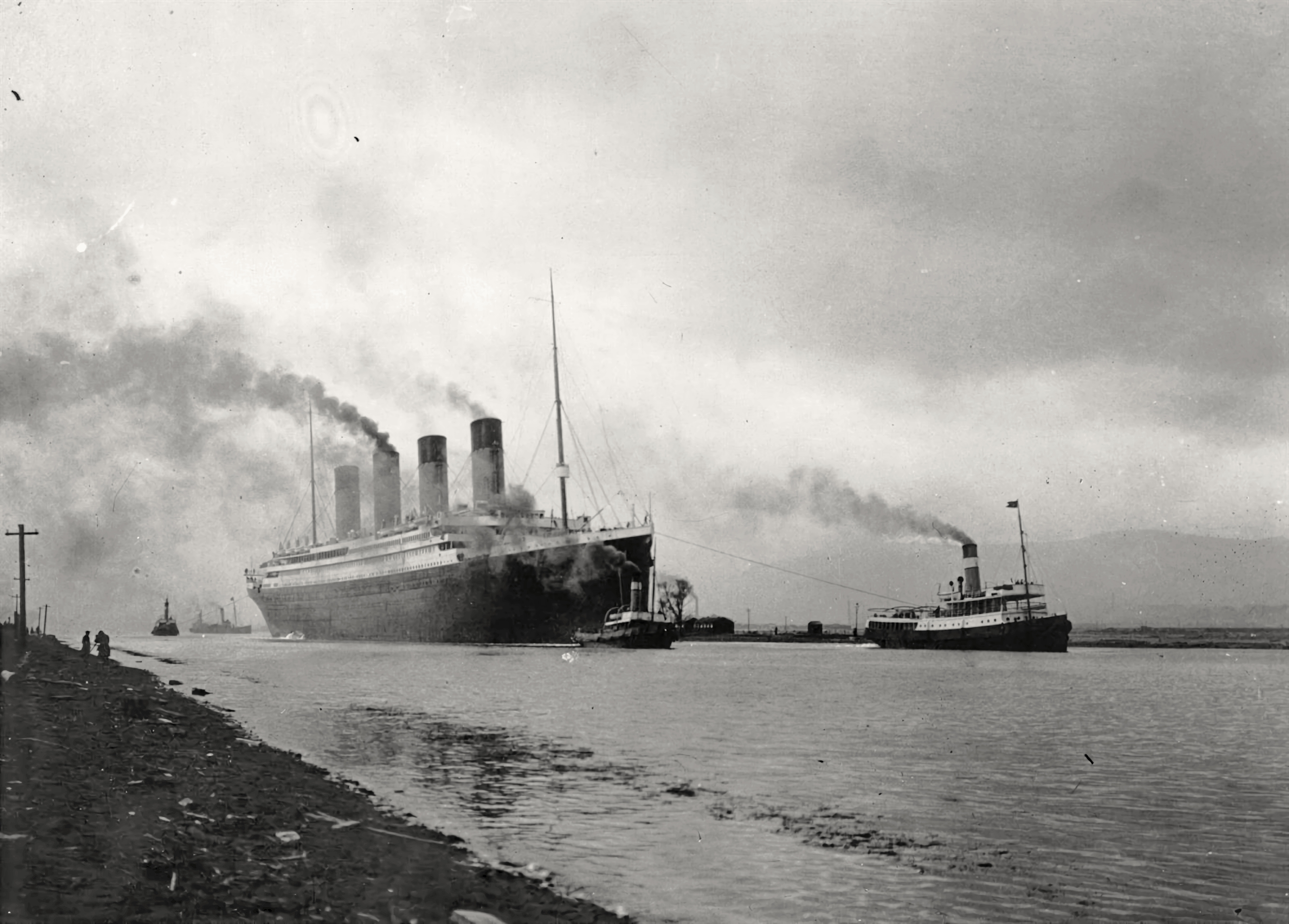
RMS Titanic

RMS Titanic was the largest steamship in the world when the vessel sank in 1912. Launched in 1938, RMS Queen Elizabeth was the largest passenger steamship ever built. Launched in 1969, Queen Elizabeth 2

In 1914, Paul Hall (labor leader) was born in Inglenook, Alabama.

During this period, Andrew Furuseth successfully pushed for legislative reforms that eventually became the Seamen's Act of 1915.

During World War I there was a shipping boom and the International Seamen's Union(ISU)'s membership included more than 115,000 dues-paying members. However, when the boom ended, the ISU's membership shrunk to 50,000.

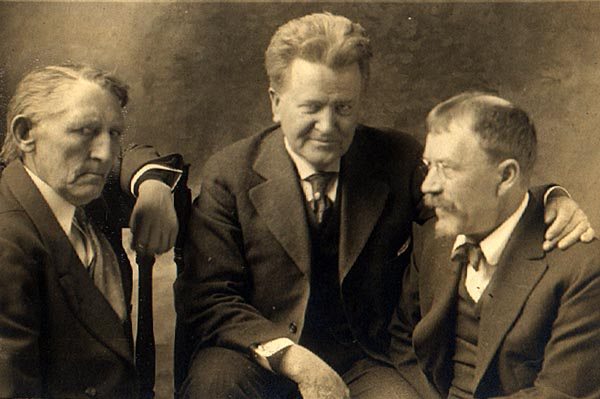
Andrew Furuseth (left) with Senator La Follette (center), and muckraker Lincoln Steffens, circa 1915

In 1915, the Seamen's Act of 1915 became law. The act fundamentally changed the life of the American sailor. Among other things, it:

1. abolished the practice of imprisonment for seamen who deserted their ship
2. reduced the penalties for disobedience
3. regulated a seaman's working hours both at sea and in port
4. established a minimum quality for ship's food
5. regulated the payment of seamen's wages
6. required specific levels of safety, particularly the provision of lifeboats
7. required a minimum percentage of the seamen aboard a vessel to be qualified Able Seamen
8. required a minimum of 75 percent of the seamen aboard a vessel to understand the language spoken by the officers

President Woodrow Wilson signed into law the Act to Create the United States Coast Guard on January 28, 1915. This Act effectively combined the Revenue Cutter Service with the Lifesaving Service and formed the new United States Coast Guard. Gradually the Coast Guard would grow to incorporate the United States Lighthouse Service in 1939 and the Navigation and Steamboat Inspection Service in 1942.

== World War I ==
In World War I, Great Britain, as an island nation, was heavily dependent on foreign trade and imported resources. Germany found that their submarines, or U-boats, while of limited effectiveness against surface warships on their guard, were greatly effective against merchant ships, and could easily patrol the Atlantic even when Allied ships dominated the surface.

By 1915, Germany was attempting to use submarines to maintain a naval blockade of Britain by sinking cargo ships, including many passenger vessels. Submarines, however, depending on stealth and incapable of withstanding a direct attack by a surface ship (possibly a Q-ship disguised as a merchant ship), found it difficult to give warning before attacking or to rescue survivors, which meant that civilian death tolls were high. This was a major factor in galvanizing neutral opinion against the Central Powers, as countries like the United States suffered casualties and loss to their trade, and was one of the causes of the eventual entry of the US into the war.

Over time, the use of defended convoys of merchant ships allowed the Allies to maintain shipping across the Atlantic, in spite of heavy loss.

The Royal Navy had conducted convoys in the Napoleonic Wars and they had been used effectively to protect troopships in the current war, but the idea of using them to protect merchant shipping had been debated for several years. Nobody was sure if convoys were Britain's salvation or ruin.

Consolidating merchant ships into convoys might just provide German U-boats with a target-rich environment, and packing ships together might lead to collisions and other accidents. It was potentially a logistical nightmare as well, and allied officers judged it too much so.

With the ability to replace losses, the dilemma of using convoys was not as painful. After experiments through the early months of 1917 that proved successful, the first formal convoys were organized in late May. By the autumn the convoy system had become very well organized, and losses for ships in convoy fell drastically, with 2% losses for ships in convoy compared to 10% losses for ships traveling on their own. The convoy loss rate dropped to 1% in October. However, convoy was not mandatory, and monthly loss rates did not fall below their 1916 levels until August 1918.

The need for administering the merchant marine during wartime was demonstrated during the First World War. Commerce warfare, carried on by submarines and merchant raiders, had a disastrous effect on the Allied merchant fleet. With the resumption of unrestricted submarine warfare in 1917, U-boats sank ships faster than replacements could be built.

== 1919-1930 ==
Another of ISU's successes was the strike of 1919, which resulted in wages that were "an all-time high for deep sea sailors in peacetime."

However, ISU had its shortcomings and failures, too. After a round of failed contract negotiations, ISU issued an all-ports strike on May 1, 1921. The strike lasted only two months and failed, with resulting wage cuts of 25 percent. The ISU, as with all AFL unions, was criticized as being too conservative. For example, in 1923 the Industrial Workers of the World publication The Marine Worker referred to the ISU's "pie-cards" (paid officials) as "grafters and pimps."

Joseph Curren started working on ships in 1922. In 1929, the California Maritime Academy was established.

== Merchant Marine Act of 1920 ==
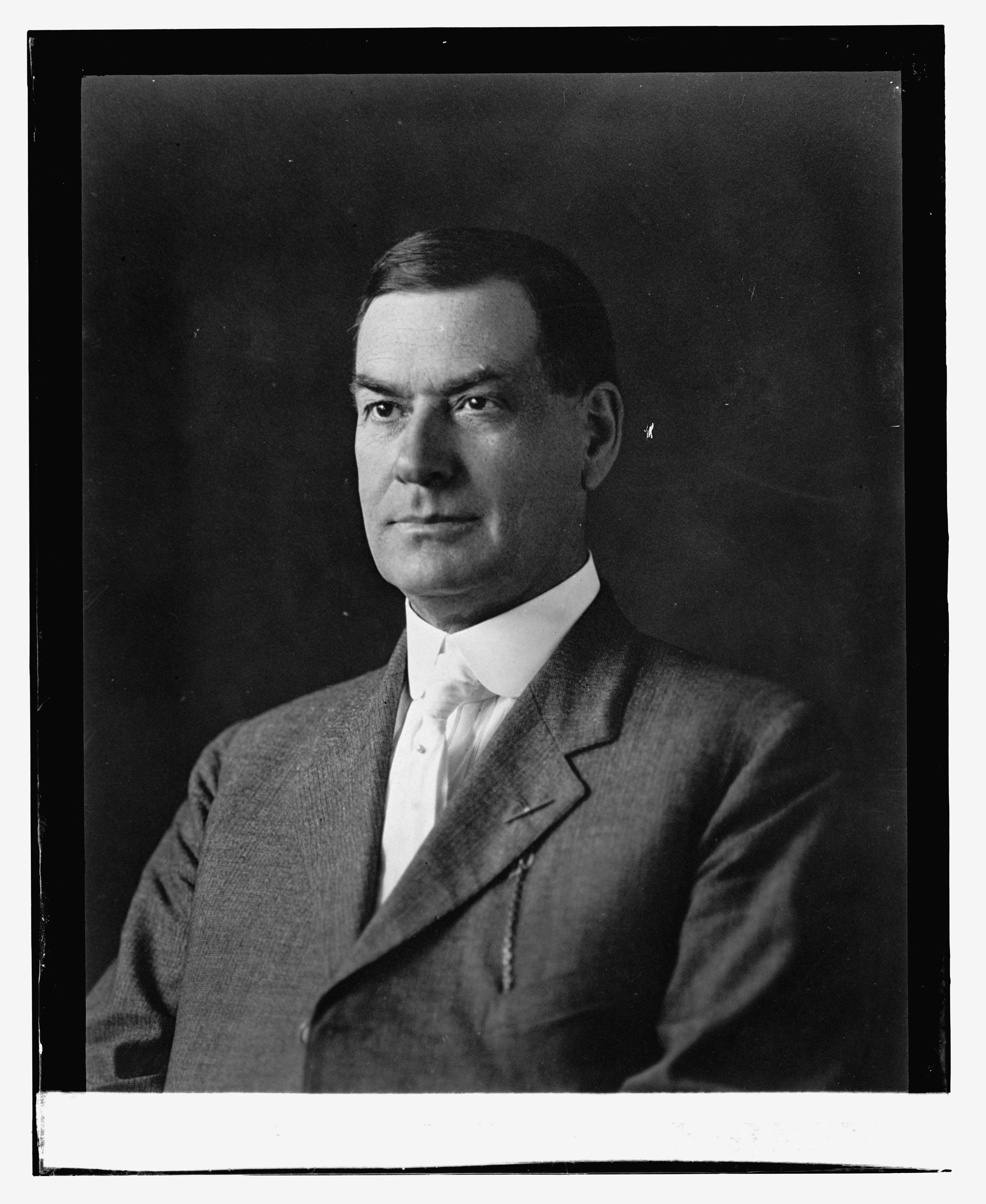
Wesley L. Jones

The Merchant Marine Act of 1920 – Is a United States federal law or statute established to protect all maritime workers including those from shipping companies, off shore oil rigging companies, fisherman and essentially anyone employed in the maritime industry. The act laid foundation for the industry and established important rules and regulations that are still in effect today. The act has long list of regulations but the most significant is the Jones Act. The act governs the transportation of all merchandise about United States coastal ports. All merchandise coming into a United States port from other United States port must be carried out by Jones-Act approved vessels. These vessels must be built in America, manned by American sailors, owned and flagged by the United States of America. "The Merchant Marine Act of 1920 is an earnest effort to lay the foundation of a policy that will build up and maintain an adequate American merchant marine in competition with the shipping of the world. The first section declares that the United States needs for national defence and the proper growth of its commerce a merchant marine of the best type of ships sufficient to carry the major part of its commerce, such vessels to be owned ultimately and operated privately by its citizens. It asserts it to be the policy of the United States to do whatever may be necessary to secure such a merchant marine, and the Shipping Board is directed to keep this purpose and object always in view as the primary end to be attained in the disposition of our ships, in the making of rules and regulations and in the administration of the shipping laws. This expresses the thought, desire, pur- pose and aim of the American people. This section is the chart to guide and the yardstick to measure every act of the Shipping Board and should be kept in mind in the construction of every provision of the act and in every decision the board may make".

The Merchant Marine Act of 1920 is commonly referred to as the Jones Act after the most significant section (27), and author/sponsor Senator Wesley L. Jones. The Jones Act protects multiple aspects of the United States including job security, National security and stimulates the American economy. The United States Navy provides a great deal of work to the domestic maritime industry by employing them to fix and build their fleet. Without the Jones Act, transportation of goods could possibly be outsourced to other countries. This would allow foreign countries in United States water ways and could potentially pose a serious threat during wartime. The United States maritime policy along with the United States Coast Guard federal regulations are among the most stringent in the world. The Jones Act ensures vessels adhere to these regulations and standards which have many positive impacts to include; reduced workplace injuries, maximum protection for marine wildlife by establishing safe emission and pollution levels. American mariners operating in American ports streamlines communication, decreases security breaches all while stimulating the American economy.

== 1930-1941 ==
In 1933, John L. Lewis founded the Committee for Industrial Organizations within the AFL. The committee split from the AFL in 1938 as the Congress of Industrial Organizations (CIO).

In 1934, Harry Lundeberg joined the Sailor's Union of the Pacific in Seattle.

The ISU was weakened by the loss of the Sailors' Union of the Pacific in 1934. Furuseth charged that the SUP was being infiltrated by "radicals" from the IWW., and demanded the SUP cease activities with the Maritime Federation. The SUP refused and the ISU revoked their charter.

The ISU was involved the West Coast longshoremen's strike of 1934. Lasting 83 days, the strike led to the unionization of all West Coast ports of the United States. The San Francisco general strike, along with the 1934 Toledo Auto-Lite Strike led by the American Workers Party and the Minneapolis Teamsters Strike of 1934, were important catalysts for the rise of industrial unionism in the 1930s.

West Coast sailors deserted ships in support of the International Longshoremen's Association longshoremen, leaving more than 50 ships idle in the San Francisco harbor. ISU officials reluctantly supported this strike. In clashes with the police between July 3 and 5, 1934, three picketers were killed and "scores were injured." During negotiations to end the strike, the sailors received concessions including a three-watch system, pay increases, and better living conditions.

In April 1935 at a conference of maritime unions in Seattle, an umbrella union was established to represent the membership of the ISU as well as maritime officers and longshoremen. Called the Maritime Federation, Harry Lundeberg was named its first president.

In 1935, the Maritime Federation was formed and Harry Lundeberg named president. He was also named Secretary-Treasurer of SUP.

The merchant marine in the United States was in a state of decline in the mid-1930s. At that time few ships were being built, existing ships were old and inefficient, maritime unions were at war with one another, ship owners were at odds with the unions, and the crews’ efficiency and morale were at an ebb. Congress took action to fix the problems in 1936. The Merchant Marine Act, approved on June 29, 1936, created the U.S. Maritime Commission "to further the development and maintenance of an adequate and well balanced American merchant marine, to promote the commerce of the United States, and to aid in the national defense."

The commission realized that a trained merchant marine work force was vital to the national interest. At the request of Congress, the chairman of the Maritime Commission, VADM Emory S. Land worked with ADM Russell R. Waesche, Commandant of the Coast Guard, to formulate a training program for merchant-marine personnel. Called the U.S. Maritime Service, the new training program was inaugurated in 1938. It used a combination of civilian Maritime Commission and uniformed Coast Guard instructors to advance the professional training of merchant mariners.

In 1936, Joseph Curren called the S.S. California strike.

On February 14, 1937, Michael Sacco was born in Brooklyn. Joseph P. Kennedy was named head of Maritime Commission. Merchant Marine Act in 1937.

On January 22, 1938, Andrew Furuseth died in San Francisco. On October 15, 1938, the Seafarer's International Union was chartered.

=== Rise of the NMU ===
In 1936, an ISU boatswain by the name of Joseph Curran was drawing attention. From March 1 to 4, Curran led a strike aboard the S.S. California, then docked in San Pedro, California. Seamen along the East Coast struck to protest the treatment of the S.S. California's crew. Curran became a leader of the 10-week strike, eventually forming a supportive association known as the Seamen's Defense Committee. In October 1936, Curran called a second strike, in part to improve working conditions and in part to embarrass the ISU. The four-month strike idled 50,000 seamen and 300 ships along the Atlantic and Gulf coasts.

Believing it was time to abandon the conservative ISU, Curran began recruiting members for a new rival union. The level of organizing was so intense that hundreds of ships delayed sailing as seamen listened to organizers and signed union cards. The ISU's official publication, The Seamen's Journal, suggested Curran's "sudden disenchantment" with the ISU was odd, since he'd only been a "member of the union for one year during his seafaring career."

In May 1937, Curran and other leaders of his Seamen's Defense Committee reconstituted the group as the National Maritime Union. Holding its first convention in July, approximately 30,000 seamen switched their membership from the ISU to the NMU and Curran was elected president of the new organization. Within a year, the NMU had more than 50,000 members and most American shippers were under contract.

=== Formation of Seafarer's International Union ===
In August 1937, William Green, president of the American Federation of Labor, assumed control of the ISU with the goal of rebuilding it under the AFL. Lundeberg, who was also head of the Sailor's Union of the Pacific. On October 15, 1938, at an AFL convention in Houston, Texas, Green handed Lundeberg the Seafarer's International Union charter. The new union represented 7,000 members on the East and Gulf coasts. Seventy years later, SIU holds the charters to both NMU and SUP.

== 1940s ==
=== World War II ===
As with the other military services, the entry of the United States into World War II necessitated the immediate growth of the merchant marine and the Coast Guard. The Maritime Commission spawned the War Shipping Administration in early February 1942. This new agency received a number of functions considered vital to the war effort, including maritime training. Several weeks after the creation of the new agency, however, the Maritime Service was transferred again to the Coast Guard. The transfer allowed the War Shipping Administration to concentrate on organizing American merchant shipping, building new ships, and carrying cargoes where they were needed most.

The need for administering the merchant marine during wartime was demonstrated during World War I. Commerce warfare, carried on by submarines and merchant raiders, had a disastrous effect on the Allied merchant fleet. With the resumption of unrestricted submarine warfare in 1917, U-boats sank ships faster than replacements could be built.

The United States intended to meet this crisis with large numbers of mass-produced freighters and transports. When World War II loomed, the Maritime Commission began a crash shipbuilding program utilizing every available resource. The experienced shipyards built complicated vessels, such as warships. New shipyards, which opened almost overnight around the country, generally built less sophisticated ships such as the emergency construction Liberty ships. By 1945, the shipyards had completed more than 2,700 "Liberty" ships and hundreds of "Victory" ships, tankers and transports.

All of these new ships needed trained officers and crews to operate them. The Coast Guard provided much of the advanced training for merchant marine personnel to augment the training of state merchant marine academies. The Maritime Commission requested that the Coast Guard provide training in 1938 when the Maritime Service was created. Merchant sailors from around the country trained at two large training stations. On the East Coast, the men trained at Fort Trumbull in New London, Connecticut, and Government Island, California|Government Island in Alameda, California served the West Coast. In 1940 Hoffman Island in New York Harbor became the third training station for the service. After the start of the war, other training stations were added in Boston, Port Hueneme, California, and St. Petersburg, Florida.

Training ships manned by the Coast Guard included the Maritime Commission steamships American Seaman, American Mariner, and American Sailor. One of these ships, the 7,000-gross-ton American Seaman, carried 250 trainees in addition to the regular crew of 18 officers and 100 enlisted men. Four complete machine shops, various lifeboats and up-to-date navigational equipment comprised the special educational equipment. In addition the Coast Guard manned the full-rigged sail training ships Tusitala and Joseph Conrad, as well as the auxiliary schooner Vema. The 261-foot Tusitala was built in Greenock, Scotland in 1883 and operated in merchant service before becoming a receiving ship in St. Petersburg in 1940. The 165-foot Joseph Conrad sailed from Jacksonville, Florida to train apprentice seamen. The training ships were important commands. These steamships were the largest ships manned by the service prior to the Coast Guard joining the Navy in World War II. CDR Alfred C. Richmond, who commanded the American Sailor, the first Maritime Service training ship, later became Commandant of the Coast Guard.

Licensed and unlicensed merchant marine personnel enrolled in the service. The ranks, grades, and ratings for the Maritime Service were based on those of the Coast Guard. Training for experienced personnel lasted three months; while inexperienced personnel trained for six months. Pay was based on the person's highest certified position in merchant service. New students received cadet wages. American citizens at least 19 years old, with one year of service on American merchant vessels of more than 500 gross tons, were eligible for enrollment. Coast Guard training of merchant mariners was vital to winning the war. Thousands of the sailors who manned the new American merchant fleet trained under the watchful eyes of the Coast Guard.

The Coast Guard only continued the administration of the Maritime Service for ten months after the United States entered the war. Merchant marine training and most aspects of merchant marine activity transferred to the newly created War Shipping Administration on September 1, 1942. The transfer allowed the Coast Guard to take a more active role in the war and concentrated government administration of the merchant marine in one agency. However, Just as the transfer removed the merchant marine training role from the Coast Guard, the service assumed the role of licensing seamen and inspecting merchant vessels.

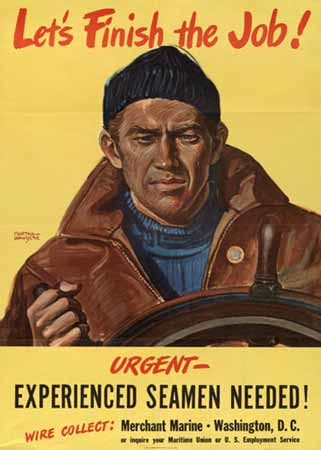
AB's were in high demand during World War II.

The Atlantic Ocean was a major strategic battle zone during World War II (the Battle of the Atlantic) and when Germany declared war on the US, the East Coast offered easy pickings for German U-boats (referred to as the Second happy time). After a highly successful foray by five Type IX long-range U-boats, the offensive was maximised by the use of short-range Type VII U-boats, with increased fuel stores, replenished from supply U-boats or "Milchkuh". In February to May 1942, 348 ships were sunk, for the loss of 2 U-boats during April and May. U.S. naval commanders were reluctant to introduce the convoy system that had protected trans-Atlantic shipping and, without coastal blackouts, shipping was silhouetted against the bright lights of American towns and cities.

Several ships were torpedoed within sight of East Coast cities such as New York and Boston; indeed, some civilians sat on beaches and watched battles between U.S. and German ships.

Once convoys and air cover were introduced, sinking numbers were reduced and the U-boats shifted to attack shipping in the Gulf of Mexico, with 121 losses in June. In one instance, the tanker Virginia was torpedoed in the mouth of the Mississippi River by the German submarine U-507 on May 12, 1942, killing 26 crewmen. There were 14 survivors. Again, when defensive measures were introduced, ship sinkings decreased and U-boat sinkings increased.

The cumulative effect of this campaign was severe; a quarter of all wartime sinkings—3.1 million tons. There were several reasons for this. The naval commander, Admiral Ernest King, was averse to taking British recommendations to introduce convoys, U.S. Coast Guard and Navy patrols were predictable and could be avoided by U-boats, poor inter-service co-operation, and the U.S. Navy did not possess enough suitable escort vessels (British and Canadian warships were transferred to the U.S. east coast).

==== Wartime controversy ====
During World War II, the merchant service sailed and took orders from naval officers. Some were uniformed, and some were trained to use a gun. However, they were formally considered volunteers and not members of the military. Walter Winchell, the famous newspaper columnist and radio commentator, and another right-wing columnist, Westbrook Pegler, both described the National Maritime Union and the merchant seamen generally as draft dodgers, criminals, riffraff, Communists, and other derogatory names.

It came to a head in the middle of the war with the writing of a column in the New York World-Telegram by Pegler, who alleged that merchant seamen refused to work on Sundays per union rules, causing sick USMC servicemen to unload their own supplies in an incident off Guadalcanal. He went on to say that these seamen received "fabulous pay for sailors, including overtime bonuses, whereas the navy men draw only the modest pay for their ratings without extras." This was a specific allegation, and in February 1943, the National Maritime Union, representing seven other unions, filed suit for libel against Hearst Newspapers, publisher of the newspaper, and the Associated Press for its wide dissemination of what was claimed to be an untrue story. As part of their suit, they pointed out that Government allotments for families, low-rate premiums on insurance, hospitalization, dental care, pension, and civil service rating consideration tend to balance the pay of ordinary seamen in civilian service. But they denied the incident ever took place, and were backed by a report of Admiral William F. Halsey, commander of United States forces in the South Pacific, to the Navy Department in which Halsey praised the "co-operation, efficiency and courage" of the merchant seamen and asserted that "In no instance have merchant marine seamen refused to discharge cargo from their vessels or in any other way failed to co-operate with the United States forces ashore in that (South Pacific) area." They won their suit, but the residual effect of the libels would last for decades.

What was ignored, say the Seafarers' International Union, was that seamen are paid by the ship owner for their work, consequently they were paid only while the ships were in the water. A seaman torpedoed off his ship was off the payroll the minute he was injured, landed in a lifeboat or hit the water. Surviving seamen had to beg, borrow, plead or work their way back to the United States from places such as Murmansk, Russia, so they could be reassigned to another ship. Until that happened, they were not paid. And in addition, they would be drafted if they did not find another ship within 30 days.

Their wartime record reveals that their losses were among the highest of any group in the front lines. They died at a rate of 1 in 24. All told, 733 American cargo ships were lost and 8,651 of the 215,000 who served perished on troubled waters and off enemy shores.

The biggest supporter of the merchant men was President Franklin D. Roosevelt. It was he who in 1936 urged Congress to pass the Merchant Marine Act, which established a 10-year program for building ships that would be used for commerce during peacetime and would be converted for use by the Navy during times of war or national emergency; and a training program for seamen that linked them to the military in wartime, specifically the Navy. It was this legislation that enabled the country to take on the axis powers a few years later, but not before extensive losses on the East coast, which was crawling with German submarines by the end of 1941. That year the Germans sank 1,232 Allied and neutral ships worldwide, including those manned by the Merchant Marine, and the following year was even worse. The Allies would lose 1,323 ships, while Germany's submarine losses totaled just 87. More than 1,000 merchant seamen would die within sight of the East Coast, and it was not uncommon for inhabitants of the seashore to find their bodies washed up on the sand.

Roosevelt, while the war was under way, proclaimed

"Mariners have written one of its most brilliant chapters. They have delivered the goods when and where needed in every theater of operations and across every ocean in the biggest, the most difficult and dangerous job ever undertaken. As time goes on, there will be greater public understanding of our merchant's fleet record during this war."

But it was not to be, for with Roosevelt's death in 1945, the Merchant Marine lost its staunchest supporter and any chance to share in the accolades afforded others who served. The War Department, the same government branch that recruited them, opposed the Seaman's Bill of Rights in 1947 (see below) and managed to kill the legislation in congressional committee, effectively ending any chance for seamen to reap the thanks of a nation. For 43 years, the U.S. government denied them benefits ranging from housing to health care until Congress awarded them veterans' status in 1988, too late for 125,000 mariners, roughly half of those who had served, who had already died.

"It's one of the injustices of American history," wrote Brian Herbert, author of "The Forgotten Heroes," a book about the Merchant Marine of World War II. "These men were torpedoed by their own government after the war."

It was, finally, in 2005 that Congress had before it the H.R. 23 bill, the "Belated Thank You to the Merchant Mariners of World War II Act of 2005", still waiting to be signed into law by George W. Bush.

As a result, those mariners who served in World War II, or their survivors, will receive a benefit of $1,000 per month, and the right to be buried in a National Cemetery "which honors veterans with final resting places in national shrines and with lasting tributes that commemorate their service to our nation."

Today, there are shrine and memorial reminders of mariners' heroism such as The American Merchant Marine Veterans Memorial in San Pedro, California, and the American Merchant Mariners' Memorial at Battery Park in Lower Manhattan. The old Navy-Marine Memorial in Washington, D.C. honors those who died during World War I.

Since World War I and World War II, many Merchant Marine officers have also held commissions in the United States Naval Reserve. Graduates of the U.S. Merchant Marine Academy are commissioned into the USNR by default if they do not choose to be commissioned in another service of the U.S. armed forces. A special badge, known as the Naval Reserve Merchant Marine Badge, has existed since the early 1940s to recognize such Merchant Marine personnel who are called to active duty in the Navy.

== 1950s ==
The U.S. Maritime Commission was abolished on May 24, 1950, its functions were split between the U.S. Federal Maritime Board which was responsible for regulating shipping and awarding subsidies for construction and operation of merchant vessels, and Maritime Administration, which was responsible for administering subsidy programs, maintaining the national defense reserve merchant fleet, and operating the U.S. Merchant Marine Academy.

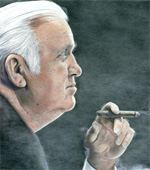
Paul Hall ordered the creation of AMO.

AMO was chartered on May 12, 1949, as the Brotherhood of Marine Engineers by Paul Hall as an affiliate of the Seafarer's International Union of North America. The original membership consisted entirely of civilian seafaring veterans of World War II.

=== Korean War ===
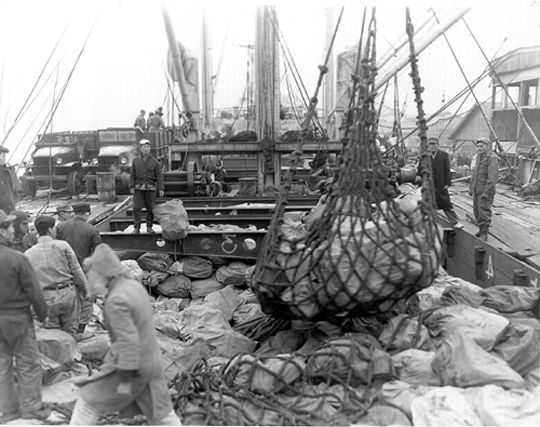
Merchant ship carrying mail from the United States to combat troops in war zone, ties up at a port in Korea. During Korean War.

On March 13, 1951, the Secretary of Commerce established the National Shipping Authority (NSA) to provide ships from the Maritime Administration's (MARAD) National Defense Fleet (NDRF). These ships would meet the needs of the military services and other agencies of government beyond the capabilities of the privately owned vessels of the U.S.-flag Merchant Marine. During times of war, the NSA also requisitioned privately owned merchant ships and made them available for military purposes. Immediately after its establishment, the NSA reactivated vessels to meet the urgent needs of America's European allies to help transport coal and other bulk materials to rebuild their defenses.

During the Korean War, there were few severe sealift problems other than the need to re-mobilize forces following post–World War II demobilization. About 700 ships were activated from the NDRF for services to the Far East. In addition, a worldwide tonnage shortfall between 1951 and 1953 required the reactivation of over 600 ships to lift coal to Northern Europe and grain to India during the first years of the Cold War.

The commercial merchant marine formed the backbone of the bridge of ships across the Pacific. From just six ships under charter when the war began, this total peaked at 255. According to the Military Sea Transportation Service (MSTS), 85 percent of the dry cargo requirements during the Korean War were met through commercial vessels — only five percent were shipped by air. More than $475 million, or 75 percent of the MSTS operating budget for calendar year 1952, was paid directly to commercial shipping interests. In addition to the ships assigned directly to MSTS, 130 laid-up Victory ships in the NDRF were broken out by the Maritime Administration and assigned under time-charters to private shipping firms for charter to MSTS.

Ships of the MSTS not only provided supplies but also served as naval auxiliaries. When the U.S. Army X Corps went ashore at Inchon in September 1950, 13 USNS cargo ships, 26 chartered American, and 34 Japanese-manned merchant ships, under the operational control of MSTS, participated in the invasion.

Sealift responsibilities were accomplished on short notice during the Korean War. Initially American troops lacked the vital equipment to fight the North Koreans, but military and commercial vessels quickly began delivering the fighting tools needed to turn back the enemy. According to the MSTS, 7 tons of supplies were needed for every Marine or soldier bound for Korea and an additional one for each month thereafter. Cargo ships unloaded supplies around the clock, making Pusan a bustling port. The success of the U.S. Merchant Marine during this crisis hammered home to critics the importance of maritime preparedness and the folly of efforts to scuttle the Merchant Marine fleet.

In addition to delivering equipment to American forces — more than 90 percent of all American and other United Nations’ troops — supplies and equipment were delivered to Korea through the MSTS with the assistance of commercial cargo vessels. A bridge of ships, much like in World War II, spanned the Pacific Ocean during the three years of hostilities.

Merchant ships played an important role in the evacuation of United Nations troops from Hungnam, following the Chosin Reservoir Campaign. The Merchant Marine and Navy evacuated over 100,000 U.N. troops and another 91,000 Korean refugees and moved 350,000 tons of cargo and 17,500 vehicles in less than two weeks. One of the most famous rescues was performed by the U.S. merchant ship SS Meredith Victory. Only hours before the advancing communists drove the U.N. forces from North Korea in December 1950, the vessel, built to accommodate 12 passengers, carried more than 14,000 Korean civilians from Hungnam to Pusan in the south. First mate D. S. Savastio, with nothing but first aid training, delivered five babies during the three-day passage to Pusan. Ten years later, the Maritime Administration honored the crew by awarding them a Gallant Ship Award.

Privately owned American merchant ships helped deploy thousands of U.S. troops and their equipment, bringing high praise from the commander of U.S. Naval Forces in the Far East, Admiral C.T. Joy. In congratulating Navy Captain A.F. Junker, Commander of the Military Sea Transportation Service for the western Pacific, Admiral Joy noted that the success of the Korean campaign. He said, "The Merchant Mariners in your command performed silently, but their accomplishments speak loudly. Such teammates are comforting to work with."

Government owned merchant vessels from the National Defense Reserve Fleet (NDRF) have supported emergency shipping requirements in seven wars and crises. During the Korean War, 540 vessels were activated to support military forces. A worldwide tonnage shortfall from 1951 to 1953 required over 600 ship activations to lift coal to Northern Europe and grain to India. From 1955 through 1964, another 600 ships were used to store grain for the Department of Agriculture. Another tonnage shortfall following the Suez Canal closing in 1956 caused 223 cargo ship and 29 tanker activations from the NDRF.

=== 1953-1960 ===
In 1953, at the SIUNA's Sixth Biennial Convention of the SIUNA the BME gained autonomy, which would allow it to adopt its first constitution and elect officers for the first time.

The first constitution was drafted by Edward Reisman, Rudolph Wunsch, James Wilde, Everett Landers, Peter Geipi, and William Lovvorn, who "wanted to craft a document that would provide for free and fair elections, set the terms of office for official positions, specify the duties of union officials, provide for charges, trials, and appeals, permit rank and file membership inspection of the union's financial records, and permit amendments by rank and file vote." The constitution, allowing for the election of a president, two vice-presidents, and a secretary-treasurer, was adopted with 96 percent of the membership voting to adopt it. Wilbur Dickey was elected first president on December 15, 1953.

In September 1954, the American Federation of Labor (AFL) recognized the fledgling union, by granting it "exclusive jurisdiction within the federation over 'licensed engine room personnel on self-propelled vessels.'"

The BME Welfare Plan was growing at an impressive rate under the care of Director of Welfare and Special Services Ray McKay. In August 1954, he reported its assets to be in excess of $100,000. The plan offered a number of progressive benefits, such as full surgery coverage for members and their families, and full coverage for seeing a physician. In February 1955, the union began pursuing the "first pension plan ever for U.S. merchant marine officers", which was well underway by November 1955.

In 1955, Joseph Curren was named a vice-president of the AFL-CIO. Due to pressures from the Second Red Scare during the Korean War, the AFL and CIO merged into the AFL-CIO in 1955 under the leadership of John L. Lewis.

In 1957, Wilbur Dickey resigned the union's presidency and Ray McKay took the position on January 17, 1957. Later that year, on October 29, 1957, McKay and then-president of the Marine Engineers Beneficial Association H.L. Daggett signed an accord leading BME to merge with several MEBA locals. The newly formed entity was known as MEBA's Great Lakes District Local 101.

On January 28, 1957, Harry Lundeberg died. Shortly after, Paul Hall (labor leader) becomes president of Seafarer's International Union. That year, Raymond McKay became president of American Maritime Officers, which left SIU, and joined MEBA. Also that year, Michael Sacco joined Seafarer's International Union.

== 1960s ==
In 1960, after an internal reorganization of MEBA, American Maritime Officers became known as "District 2 MEBA."

In 1961, the Federal Maritime Board regulatory functions were assumed by the newly created Federal Maritime Commission, while the subsidy functions were assigned to the Maritime Subsidy Board of the Maritime Administration.

During the Berlin crisis of 1961, 18 National Defense Reserv Fleet vessels were activated, which remained in service until 1970. The Vietnam War required the activation of 172 NDRF vessels.

=== Vietnam War ===
During the Vietnam War, ships crewed by civilian seamen carried 95 percent of the supplies used by American forces. Many of these ships sailed into combat zones under fire. In fact, the SS Mayaguez incident involved the capture of mariners from the American merchant ship SS Mayaguez.

The crisis began on May 12, 1975, when Khmer Rouge naval forces operating former U.S. Navy "Swift Boats" seized the American container ship SS Mayagüez in recognized international sea lanes claimed as territorial waters by Cambodia and removed its crew for questioning. Surveillance by P-3 Orion aircraft indicated that the ship was then moved to and anchored at Koh Tang, an island approximately 50 miles off the southern coast of Cambodia near that country's shared border with Vietnam.

Tragically, the ship's crew, whose seizure had prompted the US attack, had been released in good health, unknown to the US Marines or the US command of the operation, before the Marines attacked. The incident marked the last official battle of United States involvement in the Vietnam War.

== 1970s ==
In 1970, the Merchant Marine Act authorized a subsidized shipbuilding program.

On March 5, 1973, Joseph Curran resigned as the president of NMU, he was succeeded by Shannon J. Wall.

In 1976, the first woman was admitted to the U.S. Merchant Marine Academy.

Since 1977, the Ready Reserve Fleet has taken over the brunt of the work previously handled by the National Defense Reserve Fleet. The RRF made a major contribution to the success of Operation Desert Shield/Operation Desert Storm from August 1990 through June 1992, when 79 vessels were activated to meet military sealift requirements by carrying 25% of the unit equipment and 45% of the ammunition needed.

== 1980s ==
In 1981, the Maritime Administration came under control of the U.S. Department of Transportation.

On August 14, 1981, Joseph Curran died.

In 1988, Frank Drozak died, and Michael Sacco replaced him as president of Seafarer's International Union.

== 1990s ==
In 1992, while functioning as an autonomous union within MEBA, "District 2" reverted to its original name of "American Maritime Officers."

In 1993, Raymond T. McKay died, his son Michael McKay replaces him as American Maritime Officers president.

AMO finally withdrew from MEBA in 1994 and resultingly lost its AFL-CIO affiliation This was restored after approximately a decade, on March 12, 2004, when Michael Sacco presented AMO with a charter from SIUNA.

Two RRF tankers, two RO/RO ships and a troop transport ship were needed in Somalia for Operation Restore Hope in 1993 and 1994. During the Haitian crisis in 1994, 15 ships were activated for Operation Uphold Democracy operations. In 1995 and 1996, four RO/RO ships were used to deliver military cargo as part of U.S. and U.K. support to NATO peace-keeping missions.

Four RRF ships were activated to provide humanitarian assistance for Central America following Hurricane Mitch in 1998. Three RRF ships currently support the Afloat Prepositioning Force with two specialized tankers and one dry cargo vessel capable of underway replenishment for the Navy's Combat Logistics Force.

== See also ==
- Awards and decorations of the United States Merchant Marine
- History of navigation
- Honourable Company of Master Mariners London
- Jones Act
- Liberty ship
- United States Merchant Marine
- Navy Reserve Merchant Marine Badge
- United States Maritime Service
- United States Merchant Marine Academy
- Slave ship and History of slavery in the United States

== Legislation ==
- HR23 Bill Merchant Marine veteran benefits
