= Andrew Furuseth =

Merchant seaman and labor reformer

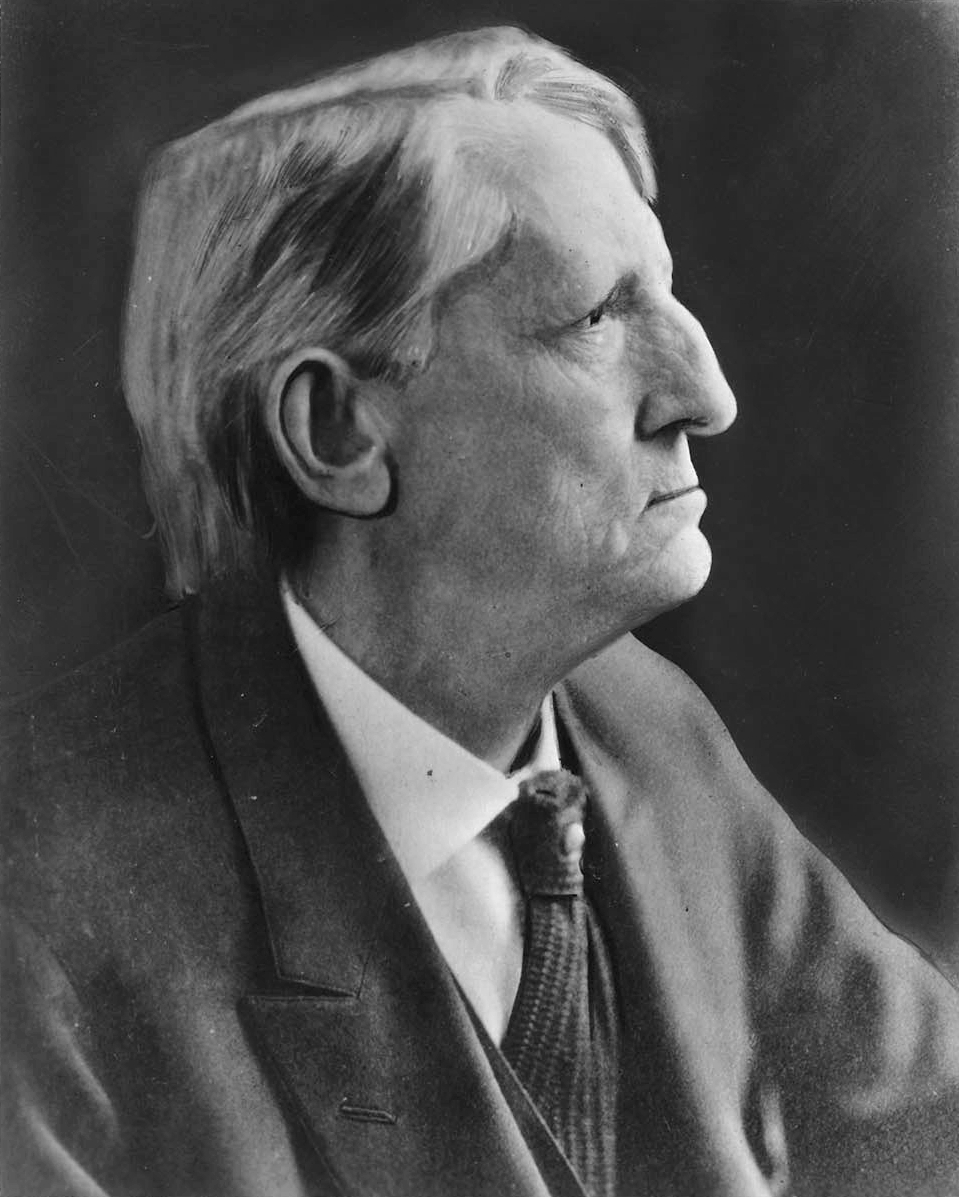
- Furuseth in 1928

3rd & 5th President of the International Seamen's Union
- In office 1908–1937
- Preceded by: William Penje
- Succeeded by: Office abolished
- In office 1897–1899
- Preceded by: T. J. Robertson
- Succeeded by: William Penje

Secretary of the Sailors' Union of the Pacific
- In office 1891–1935
- Preceded by: Henry Ark
- Succeeded by: Harry Lundeberg
- In office 1887–1889
- Preceded by: George Thompson
- Succeeded by: Henry Ark

Personal details
- Born: Anders Andreassen Nilsen; March 17, 1854 Romedal, Hedmark, Norway
- Died: January 22, 1938 (aged 83) San Francisco, California, U.S.
- Party: Democratic; Union Labor
- Occupation: Merchant seaman and labor reformer
- Nickname(s): "St. Andrew" "The Abraham Lincoln of the Sea" "The Old Viking" "Andy"

Andrew Furuseth (March 17, 1854 – January 22, 1938) of Åsbygda, Hedmark, Norway was a merchant seaman and an American labor leader. Furuseth was active in the formation of two influential maritime unions: the Sailors' Union of the Pacific and the International Seamen's Union, and served as the executive of both for decades.

Furuseth was largely responsible for the passage of four reforms that changed the lives of American mariners. Two of them, the Maguire Act of 1895 and the White Act of 1898, ended corporal punishment and abolished imprisonment for deserting a vessel.

Furuseth was credited as the key figure behind drafting and enacting the Seamen's Act of 1915, hailed by many as "The Magna Carta of the Sea" and the Jones Act of 1920 which governs the workers' compensation rights of sailors and the use of foreign vessels in domestic trade. In his later years, he was known as "the Old Viking".

Furuseth was also a founding member of the organization Asiatic Exclusion League in May 1905.

== Family and early years ==
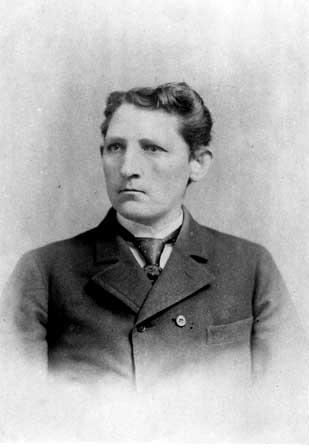
Furuseth c. 1879

Furuseth was born Anders Andreassen Nilsen, the fifth child of Andreas and Marthe Nielsen. The family had recently moved to a cottage in Furuseth in Romedal Municipality (part of the present-day Stange Municipality). In accordance with local custom, the boy was named after his residence.

In 1855, the family moved to Damstuen where the elder Nilsen took a low-paying job working at a dam. Five more children were born, causing the family financial distress. At age eight, Furuseth was sent to work for a farmer, Jonas S. Schjotz in nearby Ostby (also in Romedal Municipality). Schjotz, noticing the young Furuseth's keen mind, sent him to a private Lutheran school.

On June 2, 1870, Furuseth moved to Christiania. He worked as a clerk and attempted to enter a military academy. Although he was ultimately unsuccessful in this bid, he did develop skills with the English, German, Dutch and French languages, which not only brought him employment at the time but would become very useful later in his life.

== Career at sea ==
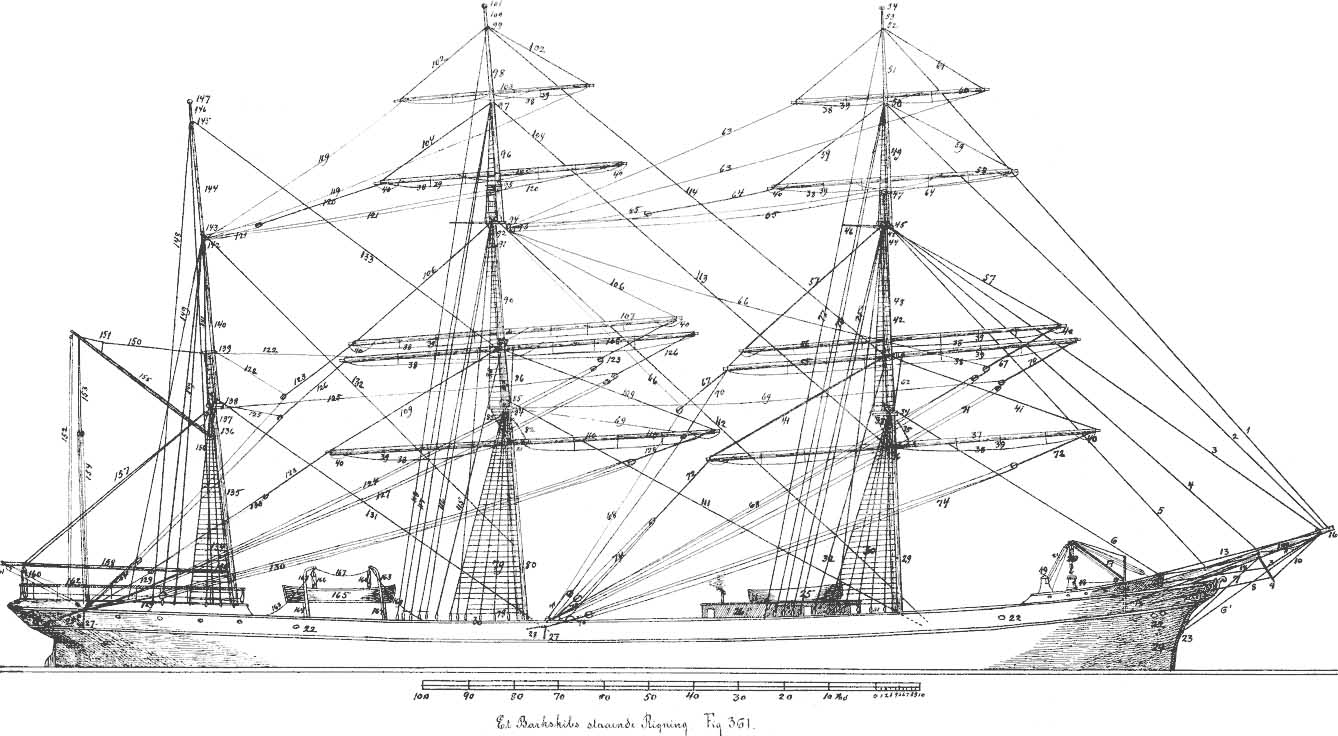
Furuseth started his career sailing on a barque out of Drammen, Norway.

Furuseth went to sea in 1873 and sailed aboard ships under the Norwegian, Swedish, British, and American flags until coming ashore in San Francisco, California, in August 1880. He briefly pursued a career in the fishing industry near Portland, Oregon.

== Work in the Coast Seamen's Union ==
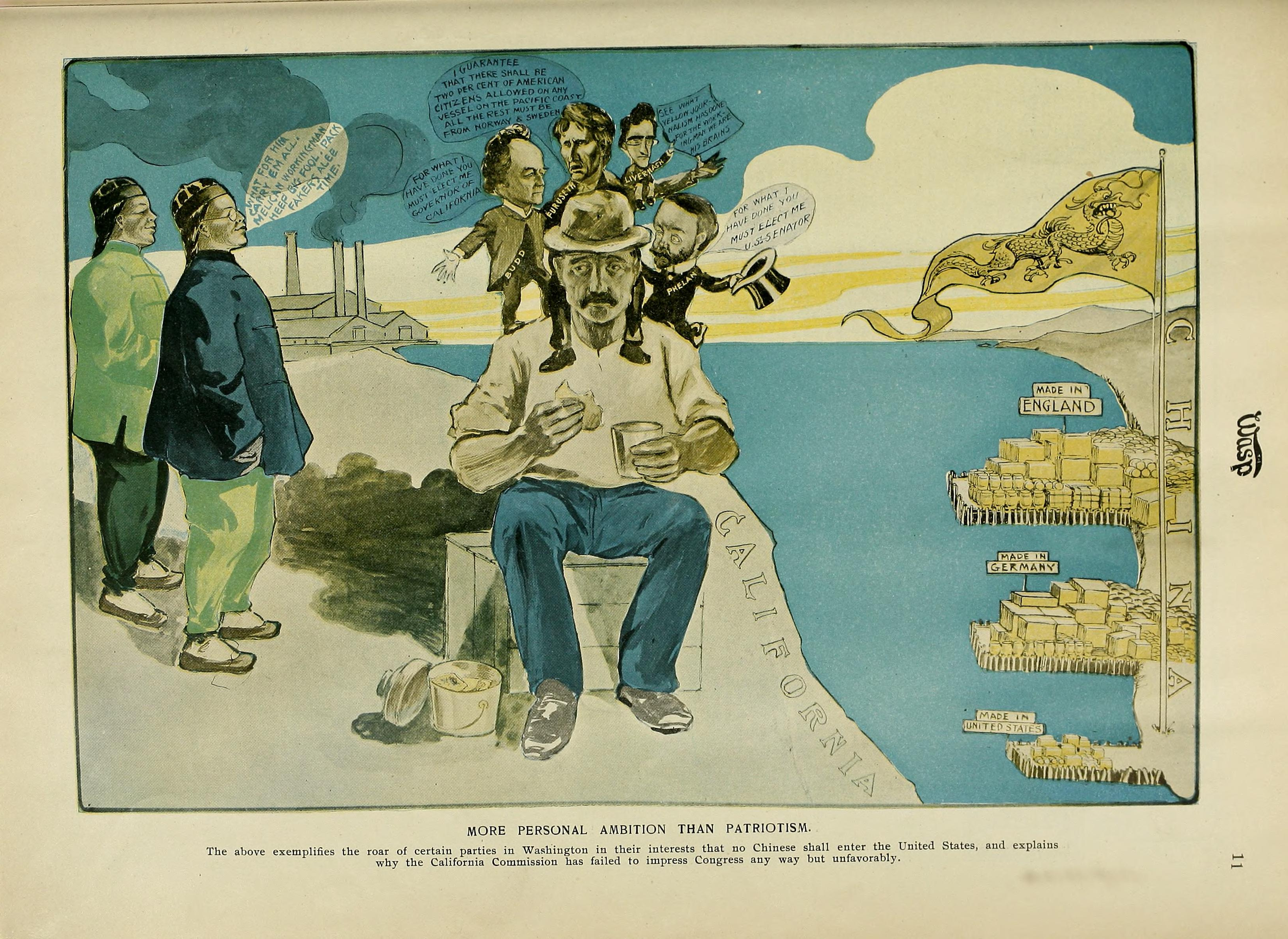
"More Personal Ambition Than Patriotism," a political cartoon published in The Wasp mocking the promotion of Chinese exclusion by Furuseth, James Budd, Edward J. Livernash and James D. Phelan, February 22, 1902

The Coast Seamen's Union was formed while Furuseth was at sea, but he joined within three months of its formation, on June 3, 1885. Less than two years later, in January 1887, he was elected to the union's highest office: the secretary-treasurer. In 1889 he returned to sea but was reelected to the position of union secretary in 1891. It was during this term on July 29, 1891, that Furuseth merged the Coast Seamen's Union with the Steamship Sailor's Union to create the Sailors' Union of the Pacific, a union which is still active today. With the exception of a two-month period when he shipped out as a fisherman, he was the head of the SUP until 1935.

Furuseth was an important backer of the successful legislation known as the White Act of 1898, which among other things abolished corporal punishment on American-flag ships and abolished imprisonment for desertion in American ports. Together with Walter MacArthur, secretary of the Coast Seamen's Union, Furuseth compiled and published the so-called "Red Record", an inventory of the various brutalities and oppressions practiced upon seamen by officers and shoreside thugs.

One of many examples was in 1897, when the British four-masted ship Gifford was lying at Port Townsend, Washington, about to depart to round Cape Horn. Her master contracted with the keeper of a Tacoma boarding house to recruit sailors for the voyage. The boarding house keeper tricked the sailors into boarding the Gifford with promises of shore leave afterwards. The ship's mates locked them on board, paid the boarding house keeper $40 per man, which they then deducted from the men's salaries (on the false claim that they owed the money to the keeper). When the men refused to work, the ship's officers cut off food and water until they gave in. Beatings and other inhumane treatment were also common in other cases, and continued well after the supposed abolition of such brutality.

Less than a year after the birth of the ISU, Furuseth was involved in a meeting in Chicago, Illinois, in which a federation of maritime unions called the National Union of Seamen of America was created. In 1895, this federation affiliated with the American Federation of Labor and was renamed the International Seamen's Union of America or (ISU). Furuseth was chosen as the ISU's president in 1897 and served in this position until 1899.

Furuseth was, alongside Michael Casey of the Teamsters, one of the two main leaders of the 1901 San Francisco waterfront strike. In the wake of police strikebreaking, Furuseth supported the newly-formed Union Labor Party. He later took part in the founding meeting of the Asiatic Exclusion League in May 1905, which was almost immediately successful in pressuring the San Francisco Board of Education to segregate Asian school children.

In 1908, he was again elected to the ISU's presidency and served in that office until 1938.

== The Seamen's Act of 1915 ==
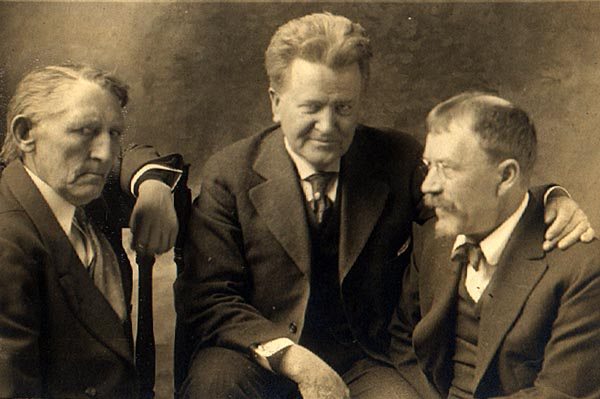
Andrew Furuseth (left) with Senator La Follette (center), and muckraker Lincoln Steffens, c. 1915.

It was during this period, that Furuseth successfully pushed for legislative reforms that eventually became the Seamen's Act of 1915. The act was hailed by many as the "Magna Carta of the Sea", and was sponsored in the United States Senate by Senator "Fightin' Bob" La Follette. The measure also received had significant support from then Secretary of Labor William B. Wilson.

The act promoted the living and working conditions of seamen serving in the United States Merchant Marine, specifically applying to vessels in excess of 100 gross tons. It fundamentally changed the life of the American sailor. Among other things, it:

1. abolished the practice of imprisonment for seamen who deserted their ship
2. reduced the penalties for disobedience
3. regulated a seaman's working hours both at sea and in port
4. established a minimum quality for ship's food
5. regulated the payment of seamen's wages
6. required specific levels of safety, particularly the provision of lifeboats
7. required a minimum percentage of the seamen aboard a vessel to be qualified able seaman
8. required a minimum of 75% of the seamen aboard a vessel to understand the language spoken by the officers

== Later life ==
A monument was erected to Furuseth at San Francisco Embarcadero on September 1, 1942. It was later moved to make way for a highway.

Furuseth's presidency of the ISU was at a turbulent time in the American shipping industry. The unions within the ISU faced "continual changeover in the makeup and leadership", and weathered the historical periods of the Great Depression and World War I. Select periods were beneficial, including during World War I when a shipping boom and ISU's membership included more than 115,000 dues-paying members.

The strike of 1919 was a great success for Furuseth, resulting in the highest peacetime wages ever for deep sea sailors. However failures followed close behind. When the World War I shipping boom ended, the ISU shrunk to only 50,000 dues-paying members. After a round of failed contract negotiations, ISU issued an all-ports strike on May 1, 1921. The strike lasted only two months, failed, and resulted in wage cuts of 25%.

ISU also suffered a tremendous blow with the loss of the Sailors' Union of the Pacific in 1934. Furuseth charged that "radicals" from the Industrial Workers of the World were infiltrating the SUP and demanded they cease activities with the Maritime Federation. The SUP refused and Furuseth revoked their charter.

In 1934, Furuseth was involved San Francisco's longshoremen's strike. Furuseth had lived in San Francisco's Embarcadero for 40 years, and was concerned the strike could lead to the kind of violence experienced in the recent Auto-Lite and the Minneapolis Teamsters strikes. He unsuccessfully attempted to mediate, pleading "With confidence and justice we can settle this strike within 24 hours and without bloodshed. Men, let's get together while there is still time. The only thing in the way of peace now is distrust, one group of the other." The strike led to the unionization of all West Coast ports of the United States.

Furuseth died on January 22, 1938. His body lay in repose at the Department of Labor. He was the first labor leader honored in this way. A ceremony was held, including seventy-one honorary pall bearers, including the "Secretary of Labor, nine members of the House of Representatives, seven United States Senators, two Supreme Court Justices, and a representative of Norway." Son of longtime friend Senator Robert La Follette gave the eulogy. He had attended every meeting of the American Federation of Labor since Grover Cleveland's administration. He never took a salary higher than the men he represented.

Furuseth's body was cremated and his ashes scattered on March 21, 1938, aboard the SS Schoharoe in the mid-Atlantic, "as far from land as possible", according to his own request. The ship's master, before the assembled crew, said, "Fellow shipmates, we are assembled here to execute the wish to [sic] Andrew Furuseth, venerable man, an unselfish worker for the betterment of seamen, who through legal means has done more to secure improved conditions under which you can work than any other man."

== Memorials ==
- The Sailors' Union of the Pacific established Andrew Furuseth School of Seamanship.
- There is a monument to Furuseth in Åsbygda, Norway
- There is a monument to Furuseth outside the entrance to the Sailors' Union of the Pacific Hall in San Francisco, California. Inscribed on it is the "Furuseth Credo": "You can put me in jail. But you cannot give me narrower quarters than as a seaman I have always had. You cannot give me coarser food than I have always eaten. You cannot make me lonelier than I have always been." The monument was originally placed at the Ferry building during the mayoralty of Angelo Rossi, it was later moved.
- The Andrew Furuseth Memorial Bust is at the National Portrait Gallery in Washington, D.C.
- The liberty ship SS Andrew Furuseth was named after Furuseth. A crewman aboard this ship told the story that would eventually become the Philadelphia Experiment.
- Furuseth Hall, at the United States Merchant Marine Academy houses the Federal Security Department and Academy Police Department, and the Department of Naval Science, a US Navy activity responsible for the academy's Strategic Sealift Officer Program.

== See also ==
- Harry Lundeberg
- Michael Sacco
- Frank Drozak
- Paul Hall (labor leader)
- Seafarers International Union

Trade union offices
Preceded by T. J. Robertson	President of the International Seamen's Union; 1897–1899	Succeeded by William Penje
Preceded by William Penje	President of the International Seamen's Union; 1908–1938	Vacant
Preceded by John T. Dempsey; William E. Klapetzky	American Federation of Labor delegate to the Trades Union Congress; 1908; With: James J. Creamer	Succeeded by Samuel Gompers; John P. Frey; Bernard A. Larger
