= Seafarers International Union of Puerto Rico, the Caribbean and Latin America =

SIU of Puerto Rico, the Caribbean and Latin America
- Seafarers International Union of Puerto Rico, the Caribbean and Latin America
- Headquarters: San Juan, Puerto Rico
- Members: 637 (2005)
- Key people: Jorge L. Cruz, president
- Affiliations: Seafarers International Union
- Website: seafarers.org

The Seafarers International Union of Puerto Rico, the Caribbean and Latin America (SIUPRCLA) is a labor union of mariners. SIUPRCLA is an affiliate union of Seafarers International Union.

In 1998, the United States Department of Labor obtained a consent order requiring SIUPRCLA "to repay $374,729, plus interest, to its welfare plan as repayment for improperly retained employer contributions owed to the welfare plan."

== Presidents ==
- Keith Terpe (1970–1981)
- Jorge L. Cruz (current)

== See also ==
- Seafarers International Union
- Michael Sacco
- Paul Hall (labor leader)
