= Sailors' Union of the Pacific =

American labor union

SUP
- Sailors' Union of the Pacific
- Founded: March 6, 1885; 141 years ago
- Location: United States
- Members: 736 (2005)
- Key people: Gunnar Lundeberg, president
- Affiliations: SIU, AFL-CIO
- Website: sailors.org

The Sailors' Union of the Pacific (SUP), founded on March 6, 1885 in San Francisco, California, is an American labor union of mariners, fishermen and boatmen working aboard US flag vessels.

At its fourth meeting in 1885, the fledgling organization adopted the name Coast Sailor's Union and elected George Thompson its first president. Andrew Furuseth, who had joined the union on June 3, 1885 was elected to its highest office in January 1887. In 1889 he returned to sea but was reelected to the position of union secretary in 1891. It was during this term on July 29, 1891 that Furuseth merged the Coast Seamen's Union with the Steamship Sailor's Union with the new organization named the Sailors' Union of the Pacific.

With the exception of a two-year period when he shipped out as a fisherman, he was secretary of the SUP until 1935. In 1908, Furuseth also became president of the International Seamen's Union and served in that office until 1938. During this period, he successfully pushed for legislative reforms that eventually became the Seamen's Act of 1915.

SUP is an affiliate union of Seafarers International Union of North America. Headquarters are in San Francisco and the union has branch offices in Wilmington, California, Seattle, Washington, and Honolulu, Hawaii. SUP also has an office in Norfolk, Virginia.

== Union executives ==
A monument was erected to Furuseth at San Francisco Embarcadero on September 1, 1942. It was later moved to make way for a highway.

- George Thompson (1885–1887)
- Andrew Furuseth (1887–1889)
- Andrew Furuseth (1891–1935)
- Harry Lundeberg (1935–1957) (Secretary/Treasurer)
- Morris Weisberger (1957–1979) (President/Secretary-Treasurer)
- Paul Dempster (1979–1990) (President/Secretary-Treasurer)
- Gunnar Lundeberg (1990–present) (President/Secretary-Treasurer)

== See also ==
- Andrew Furuseth
- American Maritime Officers
- Seafarers International Union of North America
- National Maritime Union
- Paul Hall
- Michael Sacco
- United States Merchant Marine
- Sigismund Danielewicz
- Harry Lundeberg
- 1936-37 Pacific Coast Maritime Strike
- Mahoney vs. Sailors' Union of the Pacific
- Walter Macarthur
