= David Heindel =

American labor union leader

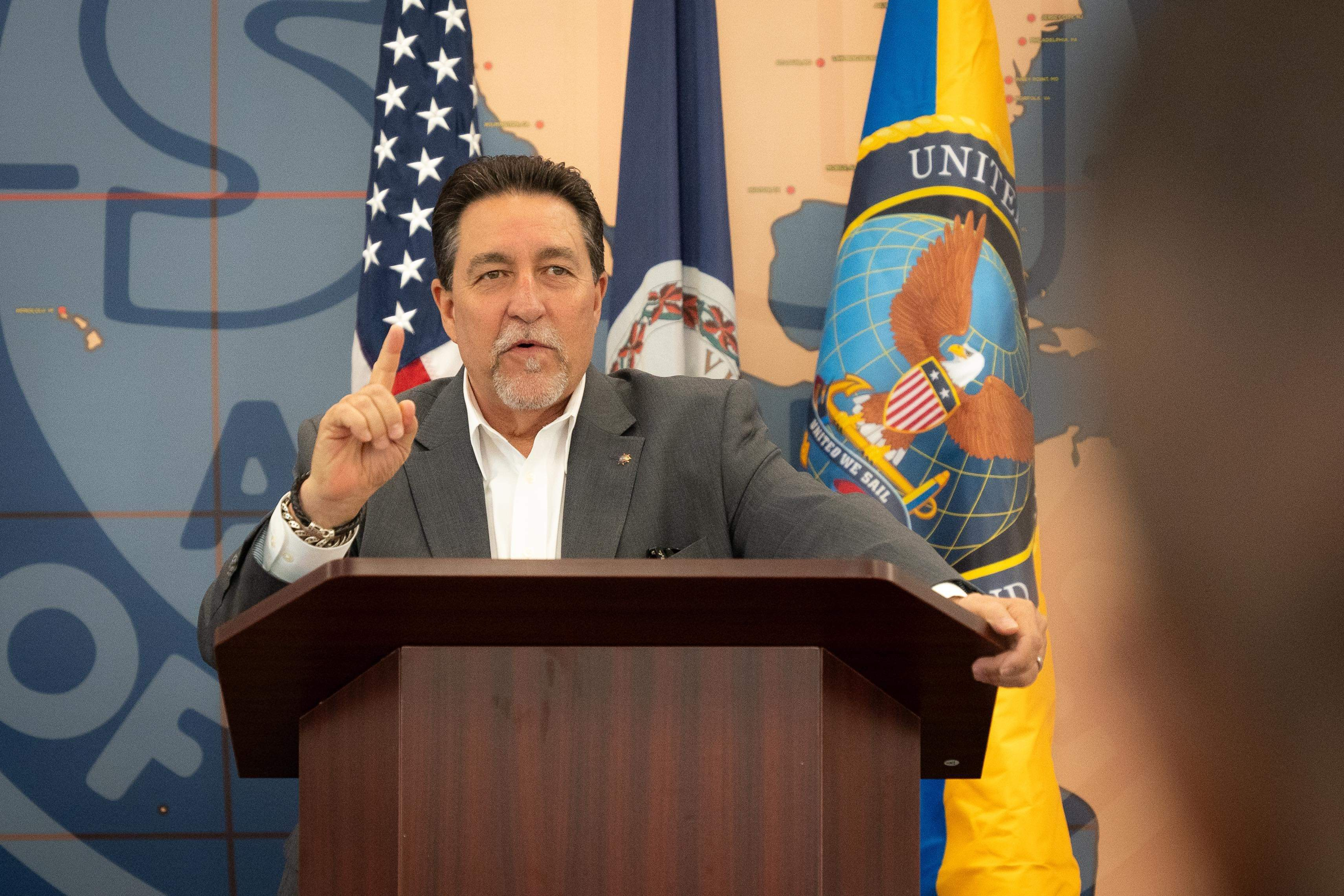
Membership meeting in the port of Norfolk

David Heindel is an American labor union leader.

Born in New Orleans, Heindel trained as a mariner at Piney Point, Maryland, at a facility linked to the Seafarers' International Union of North America (SIU). He worked primarily in the engine department of deep sea vessels from 1973 to 1980, before becoming a patrolman in New Orleans.

Heindel held various posts with SIU, including port agent in Philadelphia. While based in the city, he served as vice-president of the Pennsylvania State AFL-CIO and the Philadelphia Central Labor Council. He next became assistant vice president of the SIU's Gulf Coast region, and then in 1997 secretary-treasurer of the union, and head of its Atlantic, Gulf, Lakes & Inland Waters District/National Maritime Union. In 2002, he became vice chair of the International Transport Workers' Federation's (ITF) Seafarers' Section, and then won election as its chair in 2010. In the role, he campaigned for a new Seafarers Identity Document, for better onboard and port security, and led negotiations at the International Bargaining Forum.

In 2015, Heindel was appointed to the United States Labor Advisory Committee for Trade Negotiations and Trade Policy. In 2023, he was elected as president of the SIU. Shortly afterwards, he was also elected as president of the Maritime Trades Department, AFL–CIO.

Trade union offices
Preceded by John Fay	Secretary-Treasurer of the Seafarers' International Union; 1997–2023	Succeeded by Tom Orzechowski
Preceded by Brian Orrell	Chair of the Seafarers' Section of the International Transport Workers' Federation; 2010–present	Succeeded by Incumbent
Preceded by Michael Sacco	President of the Seafarers' International Union; 2023–present	Succeeded by Incumbent
Preceded by Michael Sacco	President of the Maritime Trades Department, AFL–CIO; 2023–present	Succeeded by Incumbent
