= SS California strike =

1936 American labor dispute

The SS California strike was a strike aboard the ocean liner SS California from 1 to 4 March 1936 as the ship lay docked in San Pedro, California. The strike led to the demise of the International Seamen's Union and the creation of the National Maritime Union (now part of the Seafarers International Union of North America).

== Strike ==
Joseph Curran was a seaman aboard the Panama Pacific ocean liner SS California. He had been an able seaman and boatswain since 1922. Although he had joined the International Seamen's Union (ISU), he was not active in union activities.

In 1936, Curran led a strike aboard the ocean liner SS California, then docked in San Pedro, California. Curran and the crew of the Panama Pacific Line's SS California went on strike at the sailing time and refused to cast off the lines unless wages were increased and overtime paid.

The strike was essentially a sitdown strike. Curran and the crew refused to leave the ship, for the owners would have simply replaced them with strikebreakers. The crew remained aboard and continued to do all their duties except cast off the lines. The California remained tied up for three days.

Finally, United States Secretary of Labor Frances Perkins personally intervened in the SS California strike. Speaking to the crew by telephone, Perkins agreed to arrange a grievance hearing once the ship docked at its destination in New York City, and that there would be no reprisals by the company or government against the Curran and the strikers.

During the SS California's return trip, the Panama Pacific Line raised wages by $5 a month to $60 per month.

But Perkins was unable to follow through on her other promises. United States Secretary of Commerce Daniel Roper and the Panama Pacific Line declared Curran and the strikers mutineers. The line took out national advertising attacking Curran. When the ship docked, Federal Bureau of Investigation agents met the ship and began an investigation into the "mutiny". Curran and other top strike leaders were fined two days' pay, fired and blacklisted. Perkins was able to keep the strikers from being prosecuted for mutiny, however.

Seaman all along the East Coast struck to protest the treatment of the SS California's crew. Curran became a leader of the 10-week strike, eventually forming a supportive association known as the Seamen's Defense Committee.

== Formation of NMU ==
The SS California strike was only part of a worldwide wave of unrest among US seamen. A series of port and shipboard strikes broke out in 1936 and 1937 in the Atlantic and Gulf of Mexico. In October 1936, Curran called another strike, the 1936 Gulf Coast maritime workers' strike, in part to improve working conditions and in part to embarrass the ISU. The four-month strike idled 50,000 seamen and 300 ships.

Curran, believing it was time to abandon the conservative International Seamen's Union, began to sign up members for a new, rival union. The level of organizing was so intense that hundreds of ships delayed their sailing time as seamen listened to organizers and signed union cards.

In May 1937, Curran and other leaders of his nascent movement formed the National Maritime Union. The Seamen's Defense Committee reconstituted itself as a union. It held its first convention in July, and 30,000 seamen switched their membership from the ISU to the NMU. Curran was elected president of the new organization. Elected secretary-treasurer of the union was Jamaican-born Ferdinand Smith. Thus, from its inception, NMU was racially integrated. Within six years, nearly all racial discrimination was eliminated in maritime hiring, wages, living accommodations and work assignments.

Within a year, the NMU had more than 50,000 members, and most US shippers were under contract. Stripped of most of its membership, the ISU became almost moribund.
