= Seaman status in United States admiralty law =

Legal status of sailors in the USA

Seaman status in United States admiralty law provides maritime workers with protections such as payment of wages, working conditions, and remedies for workplace injuries under the Merchant Marine Act of 1920 (Jones Act) and the doctrines of "unseaworthiness" and "maintenance and cure."

Each of those remedies has the same criteria for the status of "seaman," which provides maritime employees with benefits unavailable to those without the status. However, the determination of who is a "seaman" is complex.

== History ==
The term "seaman" has been used in admiralty law for centuries. Over time, U.S. courts have continued to narrow the definition of the term and the remedies available to those with the status through their rulings. The U.S. Supreme Court notably tried in 1903 to summarize the remedies available to those with the status in The Osceola.

The Court codified the maintenance and cure and unseaworthiness remedies, but its ruling on remedies involving negligence did not go over well with the U.S. Congress. The Court stated that seamen cannot recover for injuries caused by the negligence of another crewmember and that they were "not allowed to recover an indemnity for the negligence of the master, or any member of the crew."

=== Seamen's Act and Jones Act ===
The Merchant Marine Act of 1915, also known as the Seamen's Act, was passed in response to the Supreme Court's ruling in The Osceola. It attempted to create a negligence action for seamen. Section 15 provided: "That in any suit to recover damages for any injury sustained on board a vessel or in its service seamen having command shall not be held to be fellow servants with those under their authority."

In 1920, Congress passed the Merchant Marine Act, also known as the Jones Act, which provides a cause of action in negligence for "any seaman" injured "in the course of his employment." It was passed in part in response to the Supreme Court's 1918 ruling in Chelentis v. Luckenbach S.S. Co., which did not provide remedies for an injured fireman because the injury had been caused by a superior officer, who was considered a member of the crew, not a fellow servant.

The Jones Act requires that those seeking remedies under the Act be "seamen" but does not define the term. U.S. courts have attempted to interpret the term in their rulings since the 1920 Act was passed. As Justice Sandra Day O'Connor noted in her McDermott International, Inc. v. Wilander fuling, "'seaman' is a maritime term of art." Wilander interpreted Congress's use of the term to be the "established meaning" in general maritime law until the passing of the Jones Act.

The use of the term prior to the Jones Act was extremely broad, including "not only sailors and ship's officers of all known types but also bartenders, cabin boys, carpenters, chambermaids, clerks, cooks, coopers, divers, doctors, dredge workers, engineers, firemen, fishermen, harpooners, horsemen, interpreters, masons, muleteers, musicians, pilots, pursers, radio operators, seal hunters, stewards, surveyors, and waiters."

U.S. courts, including the Supreme Court, continued to interpret the seaman status liberally until the 1926 Supreme Court case International Stevedoring Co. v. Haverty, which held that a stevedore was a "seaman" under the Act. Justice Oliver Wendell Holmes Jr. recognized that "as the word is commonly used, stevedores are not 'seamen'. ... But words are flexible ... We cannot believe that Congress willingly would have allowed the protection to men engaged upon the same maritime duties to vary with the accident of their being employed by a stevedore rather than by the ship." Holmes quickly found out that he was incorrect in his assumption that Congress wanted to make the term even broader. Within a year, Congress responded to the ruling by enacting the Longshore and Harbor Workers' Compensation Act (LHWCA) "to restrict maritime workers other than 'masters or members of a crew of any vessel' to a workers' compensation remedy against their employers."

In 1946, the Supreme Court in Swanson v. Marra Brothers, Inc., clarified that the LHWCA provides relief for land workers and the Jones Act provides relief for "master or member of a crew of any vessel."

=== Wilander ===
Prior to Wilander, the U.S. courts often followed one of two tests to see if a maritime worker was eligible for the status of "seaman."

The Robinson test was to see if "a seaman contributed to the function of the vessel or to the accomplishment of its mission." The test from Johnson v. John F. Beasley Const was whether the employee made "a significant contribution to the maintenance, operation, or welfare of the transportation function of the vessel."

In Wilander, O'Connor determined that at the time the Jones Act was passed, "it was only necessary that a person be employed on board a vessel in furtherance of its purpose." Also, "the Jones Act established no requirement that a seaman aid in navigation."

=== Chandris, Inc. v. Latsis ===
In 1995, the Supreme Court was again faced with the question of who qualifies for "seaman" status. In Chandris, Inc. v. Latsis, O'Connor again wrote the majority opinion and this time laid out two elements necessary to qualify as a seaman under the Jones Act: "The worker's duties must contribute to the function of the vessel or to the accomplishment of its mission, and the worker must have a connection to a vessel in navigation (or an identifiable fleet of vessels) that is substantial in terms of both its duration and its nature."

== Definition ==
Because "seamen" are not defined in the statutes providing them with the special protections, the case law must be analyzed to interpret the statutes and come up with a general rule.

To qualify as seamen, maritime employees must be sea-based employees and a "master or a member of a vessel's crew" making some contribution to the ship's work. Employee do not need to assist in the navigation or transportation of the vessel, but they "must have a connection to a vessel in navigation (or to an identifiable fleet of such vessels) that is substantial in terms of both its duration and its nature."

However, according to 46 U.S.C.S. 10101(3), seamen are individuals (except scientific personnel, sailing school instructors, and sailing school students) engaged or employed in any capacity on board a vessel.

Additionally, to qualify as seamen under the Jones Act, maritime workers must have spent 30% of their career aboard a vessel in navigable waters.
