= Maritime Trades Department, AFL–CIO =

- Abbreviation: MTD
- Founded: August 19, 1946; 80 years ago
- Headquarters: Camp Springs, Maryland
- Location: United States
- President: David Heindel
- Parent organization: AFL–CIO
- Website: maritimetrades.org

The Maritime Trades Department, AFL–CIO (MTD) is one of seven constitutionally-mandated departments of the AFL–CIO. Formed on August 19, 1946, by the American Federation of Labor, the stated goal of the department is to give "workers employed in the maritime industry and its allied trades a voice in shaping national policy."

In efforts to support the U.S. maritime industry, MTD has helped promote legislation such as:

- The Cargo Preference Act of 1954
- The Merchant Marine Act of 1970
- The Maritime Security Act of 1995

The MTD has a network of 19 port maritime councils across the United States and Canada, as well as 24 affiliate unions.

== Presidents ==
- Joseph P. Ryan, 1952-1955
- Harry Lundeberg, 1955–1957
- Paul Hall, 1957 – 22 June 1980
- Frank Drozak, 1980–1988
- Michael Sacco, 1988–2023
- David Heindel, 2023–present

== See also ==
- American Maritime Officers
- National Maritime Union
- Paul Hall
- Michael Sacco
- United States Merchant Marine

== Archives ==
- Merle Daniel Adlum Papers. 1945–1986. 67.56 cubic feet. Contains records from Adlum's service as President of the Puget Sound Division of the AFL-CIO's Maritime Trades Department from 1968 to 1983.
- King County Labor Council of Washington Records. 1889–2012. 41.26 cubic ft. (61 boxes). Contains administrative records pertaining to the AFL-CIO Maritime Trades Department.
