= Paul Hall Center for Maritime Training and Education =

American merchant marine training center

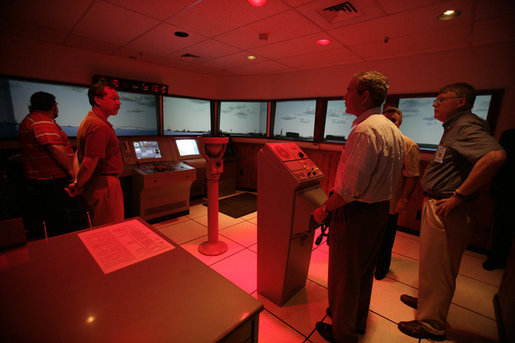
George W. Bush drives a boat training simulator during a tour of the Paul Hall Center for Maritime Training and Education on Monday, September 4, 2006.

The Paul Hall Center for Maritime Training and Education is a merchant marine educational facility in Piney Point, Maryland, which is affiliated with the Seafarers International Union. Founded in 1967 in Brooklyn, New York as "The Seafarers' Harry Lundeberg School of Seamanship", the Paul Hall Center is the largest training facility for deep sea merchant seafarers and inland waterways boatmen in the United States. The school was moved to the 60-acre (240,000 m^{2}) plot at the confluence of the Potomac River and St. George's Creek at the Piney Point location in 1991, and at the same time renamed after former SIU president Paul Hall.

According to SIU, "Tens of thousands of rated and licensed seamen have completed upgrading classes at the training center. Additionally, more than 21,000 men and women from every state in the U.S., Puerto Rico and several U.S. territories have graduated from the trainee program for those just beginning their maritime careers."

The center features a number of buildings, including:

- The Joseph Sacco Fire Fighting and Safety School
- The Seafarers Harry Lundeberg School of Seamanship
- The Thomas B. Crowley Sr. Education Center
- The Paul Hall Library and Maritime Museum
- The Romeo Lupinacci Culinary lab

Prior to the opening of the Paul Hall Center, SIU maintained training facilities at five different ports. In 1966, the union bought the Piney Point site. The program grew to include other offerings, such as a reading skills program, a high-school equivalency program, an adult basic skills program, and English as a Second Language program.

In 1978, SIU entered into an arrangement with Charles County Community College of Maryland which allows participants to earn an Associates of Arts degree. In 1993, the Maryland Higher Education Commission authorized the college program to change its degree award to an Associate of Applied Science degree and to a certificate program in Maritime Technology.

== Training programs ==
Professional training begins with basic or entry-level vocational education programs.

- Unlicensed Apprentice Program
- Deck Upgrading Courses
- Engine Department Upgrading Courses
- Steward Department Upgrading Courses
- Other Miscellaneous Courses
- Passenger Vessel Training

The upgrading programs provide experienced seafarers the opportunity to advance their professional skills.

== NCL America ==
In 2004, Norwegian Cruise Lines' NCL America division began operating the Pride of Aloha in Hawaii. The cruise line was plagued by customer complaints which prompted them to seek out a training program for new employees. The Paul Hall Center was chosen as the location of NCL America's training facility until early 2007, when part of their training operations were moved to a facility at Barber's Point, HI.

== See also ==
- Paul Hall (labor leader)
- Michael Sacco
- Harry Lundeberg
- Seafarers International Union
- MV Freedom Star
