= Harry Lundeberg =

American labor leader (1901–1957)

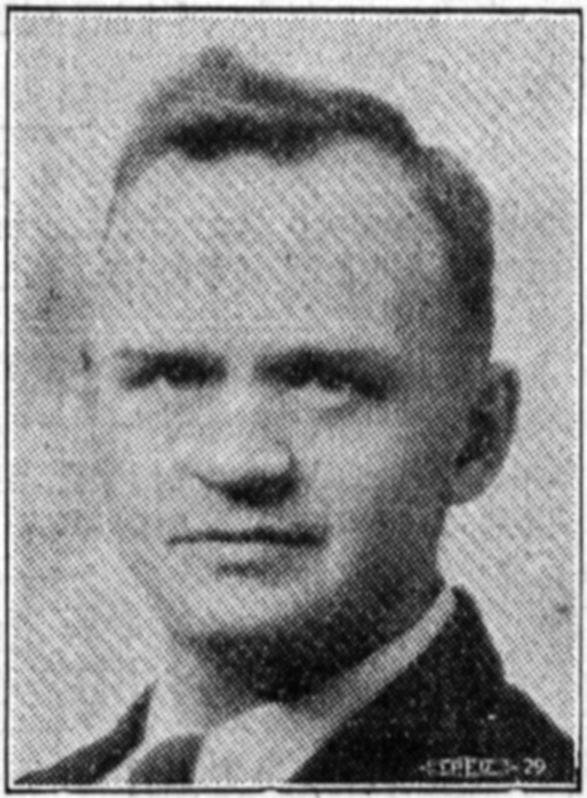
- Lundeberg c. 1937

1st President of the Seafarers International Union
- In office October 14, 1938 – January 28, 1957
- Preceded by: Office established
- Succeeded by: Paul Hall

Secretary-Treasurer of the Sailors' Union of the Pacific
- In office c. June 1935 – January 28, 1957
- Preceded by: Andrew Furuseth
- Succeeded by: Morris Weisberger

Personal details
- Born: March 25, 1901 Oslo, Norway
- Died: January 28, 1957 (aged 55) San Francisco, California
- Resting place: Olivet Memorial Park, Colma, California
- Occupation: Trade union leader
- Website: www.seafarers.org

Harrald Olaf Lundeberg (March 25, 1901 – January 28, 1957) was a Norwegian-American merchant seaman and labor leader who served as the first president of the Seafarers International Union from 1938 to 1957.

== Biography ==
Lundeberg left his home in Oslo, Norway at age 14, joined the Seamen's Union of Australia in 1917 and transferred into the Sailors' Union of the Pacific in Seattle in 1923. He sailed for 21 years on sailing ships and steamers of a variety of flags, eventually earning American citizenship.

In 1934, Lundeberg was sailing as third mate aboard the SS James W. Griffiths. In the course of the 1934 West Coast Longshore Strike, Lundeberg walked off his ship in Oakland in support of the strike. At its height, at least 8,000 west coast sailors joined the strike. On July 30, 1934, as the strike came close to conclusion, Lundeberg was elected Sailor's Union of the Pacific patrolman for the Seattle area.

In April 1935 at a conference of maritime unions in Seattle, it was decided to establish an umbrella union to represent the membership of the International Seaman's Union as well as maritime officers and longshoremen. This umbrella organization was called the Maritime Federation and Lundeberg was named its first president. Later that year, he was elected secretary-treasurer of SUP.

Over the next two years, the International Seamen's Union experienced intense difficulties, including the revocation of their charter and the loss of 30,000 seamen in July 1937 to the Congress of Industrial Organizations' newly formed National Maritime Union. A month later, William Green, president of the American Federation of Labor, took over the ISU with the goal of rebuilding it under the AFL. Lundeberg, who was now also head of the Sailor's Union of the Pacific, oversaw this reorganization. On October 15, 1938, at an AFL convention in Houston, Texas, Green handed Lundeberg the Seafarer's International Union charter. The new union numbered some 7,000 members on the east and gulf coasts.

Lundeberg served as president of SIU from 1938 until his death from a heart attack in a San Francisco hospital on January 28, 1957.

== Memorials ==
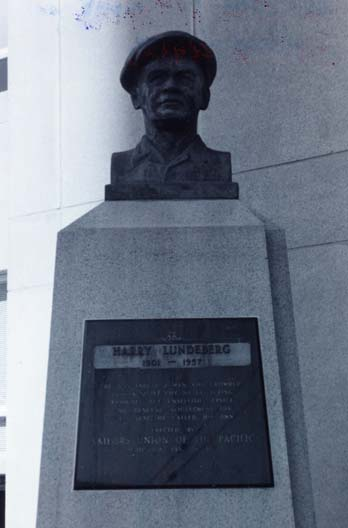
Bust by E. Hunt in San Francisco, 1957

- There is a memorial sculpture to Harry Lundeberg at 450 Harrison Street in San Francisco, California, outside the entrance to the Sailors Union of the Pacific Hall. The sculpture consists of a bust of Lundeberg, placed on a marble pedestal in front of the building. On the pedestal is a plaque which reads: "Harry Lundeberg - 1901–1957 - He was indeed a man who crowded into a short life no glittering promise, but unselfish service and general achievement for the course he called his own".
- In 1967, Paul Hall established the Seafarers Harry Lundeberg School of Seamanship in Piney Point, Maryland, to give young people the chance for a career at sea. Since then, thousands of SIU members have advanced their skills, and thousands of young people from deprived backgrounds have found employment through the school. There is a memorial to Hary Lundeberg outside the Seaman's Hotel at the Seafarers Harry Lundeburg School of Seamanship. Norwegian Cruise Line provides in-house STCW training in this facility for their new hires.
- The Lundeberg Derby Monument, on First and Wall streets (47.6147°N 122.3489°W), is a part of a series of works in Seattle, Washington created to improve First Street in 1987 called the First Avenue Project. The statue was installed by Buster Simpson when the building behind it, the El Gaucho Inn, was still owned and occupied by the Sailor's union. The statue is dedicated to Lundeberg, a key figure in the Sailor's Union Strike of 1886. Lundeberg created the sub/Union cap that was later known as the "Lundeberg Stetson". The statue's pillars stand roughly three feet high, atop the northernmost pillar is a derby cap, worn by members of the Sailors Union. The pillars were salvaged by Jack Mackie and Buster Simpson from a quarry just before it went bankrupt, two of the artists involved in First Avenue Project.

== Trivia ==
- Lundeberg's nickname was "The Lunchbox".
- Lundeberg was 6 feet 2 1/2 inches tall and weighed 190 pounds
- Lundeberg was tattooed and "never ducked a waterfront strike or a dock brawl"
- Lundeberg had a longstanding feud with longshoreman's president Harry Bridges.
- Lundeberg "once got a smashed jaw from a C.I.O.-swung baseball bat"

In testimony before the Canadian Parliament in 1996, David Broadfoot of the Canadian Merchant Navy Association recalled that in 1946, "Our government imported a thug, a real heavy-duty gangster from Brooklyn (Hal C. Banks), to smash our union and bring in the Seafarers' International Union ... which was no different from the Teamsters at its worst and no different from the longshoremen's association at its worst ... They came on our ships with baseball bats and bicycle chains. That's how they introduced their union to Canada." June 18, 1996.

== See also ==
- Frank Drozak
- Andrew Furuseth
- Michael Sacco
- Paul Hall

Trade union offices
Preceded by Joseph P. Ryan	President of the Maritime Trades Department, AFL-CIO; 1955–1957	Succeeded by Paul Hall
Preceded by new position	President of the Seafarers International Union of North America; 1938–1957	Succeeded by Paul Hall
