= International Seamen's Union =

American maritime trade union

ISU
- International Seamen's Union
- Merged: Seafarer's International Union
- Founded: 1892
- Dissolved: August 1937
- Location: United States
- Members: 115,000 (1919)
- Affiliations: American Federation of Labor
- Website: www.seafarers.org

The International Seamen's Union (ISU) was an American maritime trade union which operated from 1892 until 1937. In its last few years, the union effectively split into the National Maritime Union and Seafarer's International Union.

== The early years ==
Originally formed as the National Union of Seamen of America in 1892 in Chicago, Illinois, the organization was a federation of independent unions, including the Sailors' Union of the Pacific, the Lake Seamen's Union, the Atlantic Coast Seamen's Union, and the Seamen's and Firemen's Union of the Gulf Coast.

Formed by maritime labor representatives from America's Pacific, Great Lakes and Gulf Coast regions, in 1893, the ISU affiliated with the American Federation of Labor, and took the name International Seamen's Union of America in 1895.

The union existed at a turbulent time in the United States shipping industry. The unions within the ISU faced "continual changeover in the makeup and leadership," and weathered the historical periods of the Great Depression and World War I. Select periods were beneficial, including during World War I when a shipping boom and ISU's membership included more than 115,000 dues-paying members. However, when the boom ended, the ISU's membership shrunk to 50,000.

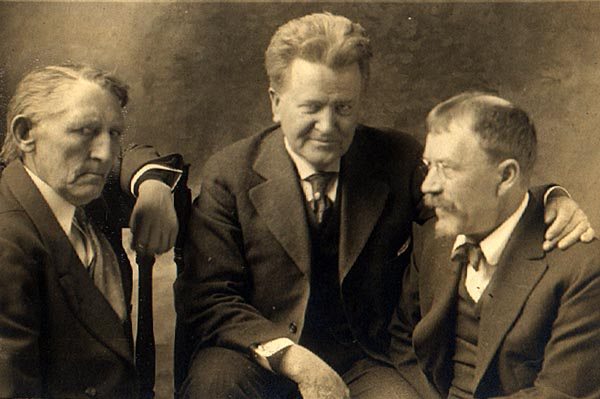
Andrew Furuseth (left) with Senator La Follette (center), and muckraker Lincoln Steffens, circa 1915

During its existence, the union did have a major effect on the shipping industry. Perhaps the most significant was the successful lobby for the Seamen's Act of 1915. The act fundamentally changed the life of the American sailor. Among other things, it:

1. abolished the practice of imprisonment for seamen who deserted their ship
2. reduced the penalties for disobedience
3. regulated a seaman's working hours both at sea and in port
4. established a minimum quality for ship's food
5. regulated the payment of seamen's wages
6. required specific levels of safety, particularly the provision of lifeboats
7. required a minimum percentage of the seamen aboard a vessel to be qualified Able Seamen
8. required a minimum of 75 percent of the seamen aboard a vessel to understand the language spoken by the officers

Another of ISU's successes was the strike of 1919, which resulted in wages that were "an all-time high for deep sea sailors in peace time."

However, ISU had its shortcomings and failures, too. After a round of failed contract negotiations, ISU issued an all-ports strike on May 1, 1921. The strike lasted only two months and failed, with resulting wage cuts of 25 percent. The ISU, as with all AFL unions, was criticized as being too conservative. For example, in 1923 the Industrial Workers of the World publication The Marine Worker referred to the ISU's "pie-cards" (paid officials) as "grafters and pimps." Additionally, the union was weakened by the loss of the Sailors' Union of the Pacific in 1934. Furuseth charged that the SUP was being infiltrated by "radicals" from the IWW, and demanded the SUP cease activities with the Maritime Federation. The SUP refused and the ISU revoked their charter.

The ISU was involved the West Coast longshoremen's strike of 1934. Lasting 83 days, the strike led to the unionization of all West Coast ports of the United States. The San Francisco general strike, along with the 1934 Toledo Auto-Lite Strike led by the American Workers Party and the Minneapolis Teamsters Strike of 1934, were important catalysts for the rise of industrial unionism in the 1930s.

West Coast sailors deserted ships in support of the International Longshoremen's Association longshoremen, leaving more than 50 ships idle in the San Francisco harbor. ISU officials reluctantly supported this strike. In clashes with the police between July 3 and July 5, 1934, three picketers were killed and "scores were injured." During negotiations to end the strike, the sailors received concessions including a three-watch system, pay increases, and better living conditions.

In April 1935 at a conference of maritime unions in Seattle, an umbrella union was established to represent the membership of the ISU as well as maritime officers and longshoremen. Called the Maritime Federation, Harry Lundeberg was named its first president.

== The rise of the NMU ==
In 1936, an ISU boatswain by the name of Joseph Curran was drawing attention. From March 1 to March 4, Curran led a strike aboard the S.S. California, then docked in San Pedro, California. Seamen along the East Coast struck to protect the treatment of the S.S. California's crew. Curran became a leader of the 10-week strike, eventually forming a supportive association known as the Seamen's Defense Committee. In October 1936, Curran called a second strike, the 1936 Gulf Coast maritime workers' strike, in part to improve working conditions and in part to embarrass the ISU. The four-month strike idled 50,000 seamen and 300 ships along the Atlantic and Gulf coasts.

Believing it was time to abandon the conservative ISU, Curran began recruiting members for a new rival union. The level of organizing was so intense that hundreds of ships delayed sailing as seamen listened to organizers and signed union cards. The ISU's official publication, The Seamen's Journal, suggested Curran's "sudden disenchantment" with the ISU was odd, since he'd only been a "member of the union for one year during his seafaring career."

In May 1937, Curran and other leaders of his Seamen's Defense Committee reconstituted the group as the National Maritime Union. Holding its first convention in July, approximately 30,000 seamen switched their membership from the ISU to the NMU and Curran was elected president of the new organization. Within a year, the NMU had more than 50,000 members and most American shippers were under contract.

== Reorganized as SIU ==
In August 1937, William Green, president of the American Federation of Labor, assumed control of the ISU with the goal of rebuilding it under the AFL. He assigned this task to Harry Lundeberg, who was also head of the Sailor's Union of the Pacific. On October 15, 1938, at an AFL convention in Houston, Texas, Green handed Lundeberg the Seafarer's International Union charter. The new union represented 7,000 members on the East and Gulf coasts. Seventy years later, SIU holds the charters to both NMU and SUP.

== Leadership ==
=== Presidents ===
1892: Charles Hagen
1895: T. J. Robertson
1897: Andrew Furuseth
1899: William Penje
1908: Andrew Furuseth

=== Secretary-Treasurers ===
1892: Thomas J. Elderkin
1899: William H. Frazier
1904:
1905: William H. Frazier
1912:
Thomas A. Hanson
K. B. Nolan
1925: Victor Olander
1936: Ivan Hunter

== See also ==
- Andrew Furuseth
- Seafarers International Union of North America
- National Maritime Union
- Paul Hall
- United States Merchant Marine
