= Thomas J. Elderkin =

American labor union leader

Thomas J. Elderkin (born 1853) was a British-born American labor union leader.

Born in London, Elderkin emigrated to the United States in 1869. He settled first in Scranton, Pennsylvania, and then in Buffalo, New York, before moving to Chicago. There, he worked as a sailor, and in 1878 he was a founding member of the Lake Seamen's Union.

For part of the 1880s, the Lake Seamen's Union was affiliated with the Knights of Labor (KoL), and Elderkin served as the union's master workman from 1886 until the union disaffiliated from the KoL. In 1892, the Lake Seamen's Union was a founding affiliate of what soon became the International Seamen's Union (ISU), and Elderkin served as the new union's secretary-treasurer. The ISU affiliated with the American Federation of Labor, and Elderkin served as one of its vice-presidents in 1894/95.

Elderkin was a delegate to the Chicago Trades and Labor Assembly for 16 years, and served as its president in 1895 and 1896. In his spare time, he spoke and wrote widely on maritime law and labor unionism. He left his union position in 1898, working as a vessel dispatcher until at least 1917.

Trade union offices
Preceded by Union founded	Secretary-Treasurer of the International Seamen's Union; 1892–1898	Succeeded by William H. Frazier
Preceded by William H. Marden	Fourth Vice-President of the American Federation of Labor; 1894–1895	Succeeded by Mahlon Morris Garland
