= Paul Hall (labor leader) =

American labor leader (1914–1980)

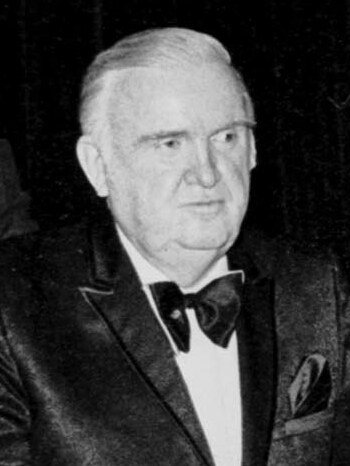
- Hall in 1972
- Born: August 21, 1914; Inglenook, Alabama, US
- Died: June 22, 1980 (aged 65); New York, New York, US
- Occupation: Trade union leader
- Spouse: Rose Hall
- Website: http://www.seafarers.org

Paul Hall (August 21, 1914 – June 22, 1980) was an American labor leader from Inglenook in Jefferson County, Alabama. He was a founding member and president of the Seafarers International Union (SIU) from 1957 to 1980. He was the senior vice president of the AFL–CIO at the time of his death.

== Early life and career ==
Paul Hall was born in Inglenook, Alabama on August 21, 1914. He started shipping as a teenager in the early 1930s, mostly as a wiper and Fireman/Watertender and Oiler (FOWT). He also earned a 2nd Engineer license, but never sailed under it.

1938 saw the founding of SIU and Paul Hall was a charter member. He made his presence felt immediately. He was a tough, hard-nosed union activist and his early waterfront battles left him with ugly knife scars on his arms and legs.

His first official post in the union was as patrolman in the port of Baltimore in 1944. He rapidly moved up to become port agent in New York and then Director of Organizing for the SIU Atlantic and Gulf District. Then in 1947, he became chief executive officer of SIU-Atlantic Gulf Lakes and Inland Water District, at the age of 32. He held this post until his death. Paul Hall led the SIU in the General strike of 1947 when seamen won unprecedented gains in wages and conditions. He also organized key breakthroughs for the union in bringing Isthmian Lines (with 125 ships) and Cities Service Tankers (a strongly anti-union company) under the SIU banner.

Through collective bargaining, he also established the Seafarers Welfare, Pension and Vacation Plans. By 1954, the SIU had aided with, as Paul used to say, "money, marbles and chalk," a total of 75 brother unions in strikes and organizing campaigns.

== President of SIU ==
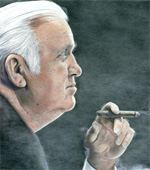
U.S. Department of Labor portrait

In 1957, Paul Hall became president of SIU-North America, succeeding the late Harry Lundeberg, a post he held until his death. In the same year, he became president of the AFL–CIO Maritime Trades Department. When Hall took over the Maritime Trades Department, it was a struggling organization made up of only six small unions. He built it into the most active and effective political force in the family of the trade union movement. At his death, it comprised 43 national and international unions representing nearly 8 million American workers.

In 1962, he was elected to the AFL–CIO Executive Council. He was senior vice president of the AFL–CIO and one of its most influential members at the time of his death. He fought continually at the bargaining table. In the words of SIU Vice President Red Campbell, "Paul Hall would go into a room of shipowners. They'd throw apples and oranges on the table and he'd come out with the fruit salad."

He established the Seafarers Harry Lundeberg School of Seamanship in Piney Point, Maryland in 1967 in order to give young people the chance for a career at sea. Since then, the school has developed into among the finest maritime training schools in the country. Thousands of SIU members have advanced their skills, and thousands of young people from deprived backgrounds have found employment through the school.

He was a member of the anti-Castro organization, Citizens Committee for a Free Cuba.

After an 8-month battle with cancer, he died at Columbia-Presbyterian Medical Center in Manhattan on June 22, 1980. He is buried at Green-Wood Cemetery in Brooklyn.

== Background ==
- Hall was a prizefighter who went to sea at age 15.
- The Seafarers Union was Hall's idea. This union would later become American Maritime Officers.
- Hall established the Maritime Trades Department as a constitutional unit of the AFL in 1946.
- Sailed with the International Seamen's Union in the 1930s.
- His SIU Book Number was "H-1".
- Hall was named "Man of the Year" by the Anti-Defamation League of B'nai B'rith March 21, 1968.
- He is a member of the Labor Hall of Fame

== See also ==
- Michael Sacco
- Harry Lundeberg
- Seafarers International Union
- Sailors' Union of the Pacific
- Maritime Trades Department of the AFL–CIO

Trade union offices
Preceded by Harry Lundeberg	President of the Maritime Trades Department, AFL-CIO; 1957–1980	Succeeded by Frank Drozak
Preceded by Harry Lundeberg	President of the Seafarers International Union of North America; 1957–1980	Succeeded by Frank Drozak
Preceded by John J. Grogan; John H. Lyons	AFL-CIO delegate to the Trades Union Congress; 1966; With: William J. Farson	Succeeded by William Pachler; Jerry Wurf
