= Frank Drozak =

American labor leader (1927–1988)

- Born: December 24, 1927; Mobile, Alabama
- Died: June 11, 1988 (aged 60); Alexandria, Virginia
- Occupation: Trade union leader
- Website: http://www.seafarers.org

Frank Drozak (December 24, 1927 – June 21, 1988) was an American labor leader. He was president of the Seafarers International Union (SIU) from 1980 until his death in 1988. Drozak was also president of the AFL-CIO Maritime Trades Department.

== See also ==
- Michael Sacco
- Harry Lundeberg
- Paul Hall (labor leader)
- Seafarers International Union

Trade union offices
Preceded by Paul Hall	President of the Maritime Trades Department, AFL-CIO; 1980–1988	Succeeded by Michael Sacco
Preceded by Paul Hall	President of the Seafarers International Union of North America; 1980–1988	Succeeded by Michael Sacco
