= Seamen's Act =

1915 American law regarding maritime worker's rights

Seamen's Act of 1915
- Long title: An Act to promote the welfare of American seamen in the merchant marine of the United States; to abolish arrest and imprisonment as a penalty for desertion and to secure the abrogation of treaty provisions in relation thereto; and to promote safety at sea.
- Enacted by: the 63rd United States Congress
- Effective: November 4, 1915

Citations
- Public law: 63-302
- Statutes at Large: 38 Stat. 1164

Legislative history
- Passed the House on August 27, 1914; Passed the Senate on October 23, 1913; Signed into law by President Woodrow Wilson on March 4, 1915

Major amendments
- Merchant Marine Act of 1920

The Seamen's Act, formally known as Act to Promote the Welfare of American Seamen in the Merchant Marine of the United States or Longshore and Harbor Workers' Compensation Act (Act of March 4, 1915, ch. 153, 38 Stat. 1164), was designed to improve the safety and the security of United States seamen and to eliminate shanghaiing.

"The 1915 statute... has been described as the Magna Carta of American sailors' rights."

== History ==
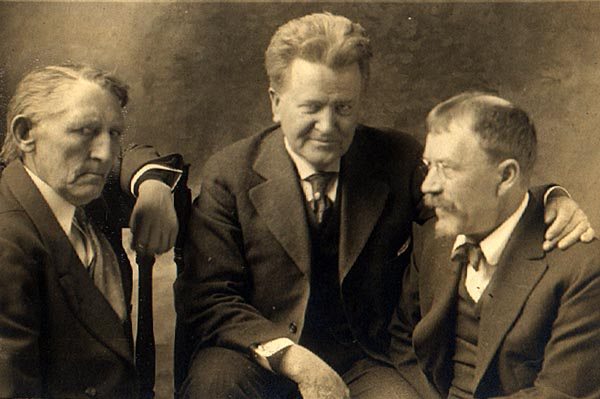
Senator La Follette (center), with maritime labor leader Andrew Furuseth (left) and muckraker Lincoln Steffens, circa 1915.

Trade unions like the International Seamen's Union (ISU) provided much of the impetus for the bill, which was further promoted by the increasing international tensions in the years preceding World War I. The bill was first proposed in 1913 but became a law after the beginning of hostilities in Europe, though before the United States joined the conflict. The sinking of the RMS Titanic in 1912 raised the issue of safety at sea and became a political issue as well.

The Act was sponsored by U.S. Senator Robert M. La Follette. The ISU had a significant influence on the drafting of the bill, with its president, Andrew Furuseth, cited as being behind the bill's intent and content. U.S. Secretary of Labor William B. Wilson supported the bill's passage.

"Commemorating the passage of the Seamen's Act"

The law was the culmination of twenty years of agitation by Furuseth. U.S. President Woodrow Wilson had supported such a bill at the beginning of his administration, but in late 1913, U.S. Secretary of State William Jennings Bryan had been negotiating with the British for a Convention on Safety at Sea Treaty, which would have established international, rather than national, standards for the treatment of sailors on ships. The Senate ratified the Bryan Conciliation Treaty on August 27, 1914, and Bryan urged Wilson to use a pocket veto for the La Follette Bill. Furuseth came to Washington and literally begged Wilson to sign the bill.

Bryan was nearly moved to tears since he realized the sincere determination and conviction of a man who had labored for such legislation for decades, and Wilson signed it into law. Explaining his signing of the bill, Wilson said that he did so "because it seemed the only chance to get something like justice done to a class of workmen who have been too much neglected by our laws."

The law was designed to promote the living and working conditions of seamen serving in the U.S. Merchant Marine. It applied to vessels in excess of 100 gross tons excluding river craft.

== Provisions of the act ==
The law included provisions to:

- abolish imprisonment for desertion
- reduce penalties for disobedience
- regulate the working hours of seamen both at sea and in port
- establish a minimum quality for rations supplied to seamen
- regulate the payment of wages to seamen
  - establish a harsh penalty of double wages per day that any wages remained unpaid upon a sailor's discharge (which resulted in one case in 1982 in which the U.S. Supreme Court awarded $302,790.40 to a sailor who had been discharged with $412.50 in unpaid wages)
- set safety requirements, including the provision of lifeboats
- require a minimum percentage of the seamen aboard a vessel to be qualified able seamen
- require at least 75% of the seamen aboard a vessel to understand the language spoken by the officers

== Later legislation ==
The Act did little to help seamen who were injured in the course of their duties, and the Merchant Marine Act of 1920, commonly known as the Jones Act, was passed in an attempt to address such incidents.

== Criticism ==
Shipowners generally opposed the Seamen's Act and the Jones Act as excessive and unnecessary interference with the freedom of contract. They responded by pioneering the now-common practice of chartering ships overseas under flags of convenience. Shipping companies claimed that the unhappy result was the crippling of America's merchant marine, as freight rates spiraled upward with crews' wages.

At least one company, the Pacific Mail Steamship Company, ceased operations in the Far East and declared that the increased cost of English-speaking crews would make it uncompetitive against foreign companies without such restrictions.
