= Michael Sacco =

American labor leader (1937–2023)

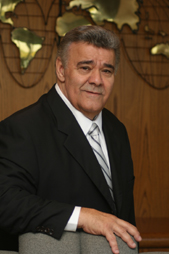
- Born: February 14, 1937; Brooklyn, New York, U.S.
- Died: December 28, 2023 (aged 86); St. Louis, Missouri, U.S.
- Occupation: Trade union leader
- Spouse: Sophie Sacco
- Children: 4

Michael Sacco (February 14, 1937 – December 28, 2023) was an American labor leader from Brooklyn, New York. He was appointed as the president of the Seafarers International Union of North America, AFL-CIO in June 1988 by the SIUNA Executive Board.

From 1988, Sacco also served as president of The Maritime Trades Department AFL-CIO, a post he was re-elected to in 2009. In November, 1991, he was elected a vice-president of the AFL-CIO.

Sacco served in the U.S. Air Force from 1954 to 1958. In 1958, he joined SIU. From 1968 to 1979 he was vice president of the Seafarers Harry Lundeberg School of Seamanship, the union's vocational training facility in Piney Point, Maryland.

From 1980 to 1988, Sacco was vice president of the SIUNA-affiliated Seafarers International Union; Atlantic, Gulf, Lakes and Inland Waters District. He was also secretary-treasurer of the Greater St. Louis Area and Vicinity Port Council and an executive board member of the Missouri State AFL-CIO.

Sacco retired in February 2023.

Sacco was married and had four children. He died on December 28, 2023, at the age of 86.

== See also ==
- Paul Hall (labor leader)
- Harry Lundeberg
- Seafarers International Union of North America

Trade union offices
Preceded by Frank Drozak	President of the Maritime Trades Department, AFL-CIO; 1988–2023	Succeeded by David Heindel
Preceded by Frank Drozak	President of the Seafarers International Union of North America; 1988–2023	Succeeded by David Heindel
