= Seafarers International Union of North America =

Labor union

SIU
- Seafarers International Union
- Founded: October 14, 1938
- Headquarters: Camp Springs, Maryland
- Location: United States
- Members: 35,498 (2005)
- Key people: David Heindel, president
- Affiliations: AFL–CIO
- Website: www.seafarers.org

Seafarers International Union is the largest union in North America representing merchant mariners.

Seafarers International Union staffs union halls in 20 seaports, including facilities in Guam and Puerto Rico, according to the SIU website.

This watch bob references the Seafarers Log, SIU's official organ. The Log is published monthly by Seafarers International Union, Atlantic, Gulf, Lakes and Inland Waters District/NMU, AFL–CIO.

The Seafarers International Union or SIU is an organization of 12 autonomous labor unions of mariners, fishermen and boatmen working aboard vessels flagged in the United States or Canada. Michael Sacco was its president from 1988 until 2023. The organization has an estimated 35,498 members and is the largest maritime labor organization in the United States. Organizers founded the union on October 14, 1938. The Seafarers International Union arose from a charter issued to the Sailors Union of the Pacific by the American Federation of Labor as a foil against loss of jobs to the Congress of Industrial Organizations (CIO) and its Communist Party-aligned faction.

Today the SIU represents mariners and boatmen who sail aboard U.S.-flagged vessels and Canadian- flagged vessels in deep sea, the Great Lakes, and inland waterways. Membership includes workers in the deck, steward, and engine departments. SIU members are represented aboard a wide variety of vessels, including: military support, commercial trade, tugboats, passenger ships, barges, and gaming vessels. Military support vessels operated by the U.S. Department of Defense's Military Sealift Command (MSC) provide a key source of jobs for seafarers. MSC operates some 110 noncombat ships that support U.S. forces around the world.

SIU membership includes eligibility for access to healthcare, retirement, and education benefits. Educational facilities include the union's Paul Hall Center for Maritime Training and Education at Piney Point, Maryland. The training center started in Brooklyn, New York, and is named after a former SIU president, Paul Hall. The school opened in 1967 and has trained more than 100,000 mariners.

Highly active in the political arena, the SIU states that its primary focus is to maintain safe working environments for men and women working aboard vessels, and to ensure very high standards of training among its membership.

== History ==
The Seafarers International Union's founding on October 14, 1938, came during the turbulent times of the Great Depression, a worldwide economic slowdown, and the international rise of communism. SIU's roots, however, reach back to 1892, when delegates representing unions of the West Coast, the Gulf of Mexico, and the Great Lakes gathered at a seamen’s convention in Chicago. The convention eventually gave rise to a federation of maritime unions known as the International Seamen's Union (ISU) chartered by the American Federation of Labor (AFL).

SIU's origin is portrayed by the union as an outcome of the "wreckage" of ISU. The breakup saw ISU membership plummet from more than 100,000 after World War I to less than 3,000 by the mid-1930s. The revocation of ISU's charter and the loss of 30,000 seamen in July 1937 to the Congress of Industrial Organizations' newly formed National Maritime Union (NMU) signaled ISU's death knell.

Leadership of AFL, one of the first federations of labor unions, understood that the ISU was near collapse. The AFL subsequently moved to replace it by issuing a charter to the Sailors Union of the Pacific (SUP) to organize the new Seafarers International Union. Harry Lundeberg, a SUP officer and seaman who was originally from Norway, became the Seafarers International Union's first president. The SUP remained autonomous for years within SIU.

The AFL's action to form the SIU not only countered the threat of loss of seafaring jobs to the NMU but also served as a political block against the increasing Communist influence in the rival Congress of Industrial Organizations. NMU, a product of the economic struggles and waterfront strikes of the times, became a longtime nemesis of SIU. The two unions fiercely competed for seafaring jobs until they merged in 2001.

The Seafarers International Union membership lagged behind that of the National Maritime Union during World War II. Then Paul Hall started organizing seamen on the East Coast and the Gulf. By 1948, the surge in new membership propelled Hall to the post of SIU vice president.

This consolidation helped the SIU edge out the NMU whose earlier purging of Communist Party members or those suspected of CP association had left it weakened. Moreover, Lundeberg's death in 1957 ended a long-running power struggle between Lundeberg and Hall. Heir-apparent Hall subsequently was named SIU president and, later that year president of the AFL–CIO Maritime Trades Department.

When Hall took over the Maritime Trades Department, it was a struggling organization made up of only six small unions. He built it into an active and effective political force in the trade union movement. At his death, Maritime Trades Department comprised 43 national and international unions representing nearly 8 million American workers.

In 1967, Hall established the Seafarers Harry Lundeberg School of Seamanship in Piney Point, Maryland, to give young people the chance for a career at sea. Since then, the school has become one of the finest maritime training schools in the country. Thousands of SIU members have advanced their skills at the school. Moreover, the Harry Lundeberg School has also presented opportunities for generations of young people from deprived backgrounds to gain employment.

The 1970s saw further strengthening of the SIU with acquisition through merger of the National Union of Marine Cooks and Stewards (NUMCS).

After an eight-month battle with cancer, Hall died in 1980.

== Controversy ==
In 2005, SIU and the Paul Hall Center for Maritime Training and Education were sued for age discrimination by the Equal Employment Opportunity Commission. The SIU was restricting applicants based on age rather than ability, rejecting any apprentice applicants over the age of 35. In the opinion on the Fourth Circuit Court of Appeals, "throughout this appeal, and in the proceedings before the district court, the center and the union ... maintained that age-barriers to entry are a hallmark of apprenticeships and complained that the EEOC's regulation effectively guts that employment practice by erasing its defining characteristic." In 2006 the case remanded back to the Baltimore federal district court and that court ruled in favor of the EEOC and ordered back payments in the range of $2 million to over 180 plaintiffs and further ordered that they and all future applicants to the Paul Hall maritime school be admitted regardless of age.

In testimony before the Parliament of Canada in 1996, David Broadfoot of the Canadian Merchant Navy Association recalled that in 1946, "Our government imported a thug, a real heavy-duty gangster from Brooklyn (Hal C. Banks), to smash our union and bring in the Seafarers' International Union ... which was no different from the Teamsters at its worst and no different from the longshoremen's association at its best. ... They came on our ships with baseball bats and bicycle chains. That's how they introduced their union to Canada."

== Leadership ==
=== Presidents ===
- Harry Lundeberg (1938–1957)
- Paul Hall (1957–1980)
- Frank Drozak (1980–1988)
- Michael Sacco (1988–2023)
- David Heindel (2023–present)

=== Secretary-Treasurers ===
1938: John Hawk
1971: Joseph DiGiorgio
1990: John Fay
1997: David Heindel
2023: Tom Orzechowski

== Affiliated unions ==
According to its 2005 report at The Department of Labor, total membership of all 13 affiliated unions is 35,498. Information for affiliated unions follows:

SIUNA-affiliated unions
Affiliated union	Total assets	Total membership	Reference
Seafarers International Union of North America; Atlantic, Gulf, Lakes & Inland Waters; District/National Maritime Union (http://www.seafarers.org)	$19,868,333	11,714	2005 Report
American Maritime Officers (http://www.amo-union.org)	$15,228,913	3,921	2006 Report
Fishermen's Union of America Pacific & Caribbean	$10,525	45	2005 Report
Industrial, Professional, Technical Workers International Union	$416,930	1,064	2005 Report
Marine Firemen's Union (http://www.mfoww.org/)	$3,675,662	802	2005 Report
Sailors' Union of the Pacific(http://www.sailors.org)	$2,811,294	736	2005 Report
Seafarers Entertainment and Allied Trades Union (http://www.seatu.org/xp/seatu/)	$195,316	3,421	2005 Report
Seafarers' International Union of Canada (http://www.seafarers.ca)	Unknown	Unknown	Unknown
Seafarers Maritime Union	$1,200,432	110	2005 Report
Sugar Workers Union No. 1	$280,209	332	2005 Report
United Industrial, Service, Transportation, Professional and Government Workers of North America	Unknown	Unknown	Unknown

=== Recently terminated affiliate unions ===
- Seafarers' Professional Security Officers Association was terminated in 2004.
- Seafarers AFL–CIO Local Union 5 Chauffeurs and Industrial Workers was terminated in 2000.
- Seafarers AFL–CIO Local Union 300 United Industrial Workers - Midwest was terminated in 2000.
- Seafarers AFL–CIO Local Union Marine Staff Officers Pacific District was terminated in 2002.

== See also ==
- Paul Hall Center for Maritime Training and Education
- United States Merchant Marine
- The Seafarers, a 1953 documentary short commissioned by the union, directed by Stanley Kubrick

Related organizations

- American Maritime Officers
- National Maritime Union
- Marine Engineers Benevolent Association
- Maritime Trades Department
- Sailors' Union of the Pacific
- Seafarers' International Union of Canada
