= National Maritime Union =

Former American labor union

- Merged: Seafarers International Union of North America (June 3, 2001)
- Founded: May 1937
- Headquarters: New York City
- Location: United States
- Affiliations: Congress of Industrial Organizations, later AFL–CIO

The National Maritime Union (NMU) was an American labor union founded in May 1937. It affiliated with the Congress of Industrial Organizations (CIO) in July 1937. After a failed merger with a different maritime group in 1988, the union merged with the Seafarers International Union of North America in 2001.

== Early years ==
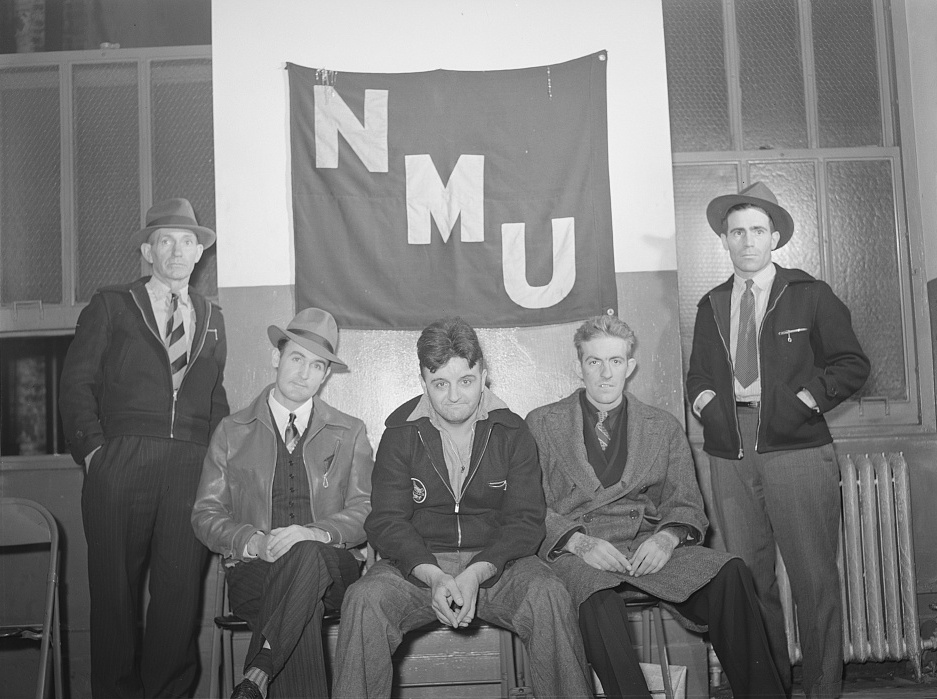
Seamen in hiring hall, NMU banner, New York City, December 1941. (Photograph: Arthur Rothstein)

The NMU was founded in May 1937 by Joseph Curran and his allies, which at the time included Jack Lawrenson. At the time Curran was an able seaman and boatswain aboard the Panama Pacific Line ocean liner SS California. He was a member of the International Seamen's Union (ISU) but was not active in the work of the union. Lawrenson later married writer Helen Lawrenson. He was forced out of the union in 1947, and according to his wife, Curran essentially wrote Lawrenson out of the union's history.

From March 1 to March 4, 1936, Curran led a strike aboard California, then docked in San Pedro, Los Angeles, California. Curran and the crew of California went on what was essentially a sitdown strike at sailing time, refusing to cast off the lines unless wages were increased and overtime paid.

United States secretary of labor Frances Perkins personally intervened to resolve the strike. Speaking to the crew by telephone, Perkins agreed to arrange a grievance hearing once the ship docked at its destination in New York City, and that there would be no reprisals by the company or government against Curran and the strikers.

On California's return trip, Panama Pacific Line raised wages by $5 a month to $60 per month. However, United States secretary of commerce Daniel Roper and the Panama Pacific Line declared Curran and the strikers mutineers. Curran and other top strike leaders were fined two days' pay, fired and blacklisted, but Perkins was able to keep the strikers from being prosecuted for mutiny.

Seamen all along the East Coast struck to protest the treatment of the California's crew. Curran became a leader of the 10-week strike, eventually forming a supportive association known as the Seamen's Defense Committee. In October 1936, Curran called a second strike, the 1936 Gulf Coast maritime workers' strike, in part to improve working conditions and in part to embarrass the ISU. The four-month strike idled 50,000 seamen and 300 ships along the Atlantic and Gulf coasts.

Believing it was time to abandon the conservative International Seamen's Union, Curran began to sign up members for a new, rival union. The level of organizing was so intense that hundreds of ships delayed their sailing time as seamen listened to organizers and signed union cards. One of the co-founders of the organization was the later civil rights activist James Peck.

In May 1937, Curran and other leaders of his Seamen's Defense Committee reconstituted the group as the National Maritime Union. (CPUSA co-founder Boleslaw Gerbert may have helped form this union. It held its first convention in July, and 30,000 seamen left the ISU to join the NMU. Curran was elected president of the new organization. The black, Jamaican-born Ferdinand Smith was elected as the union's secretary-treasurer. Within a year, the NMU had more than 50,000 members, and most American shippers were under contract.

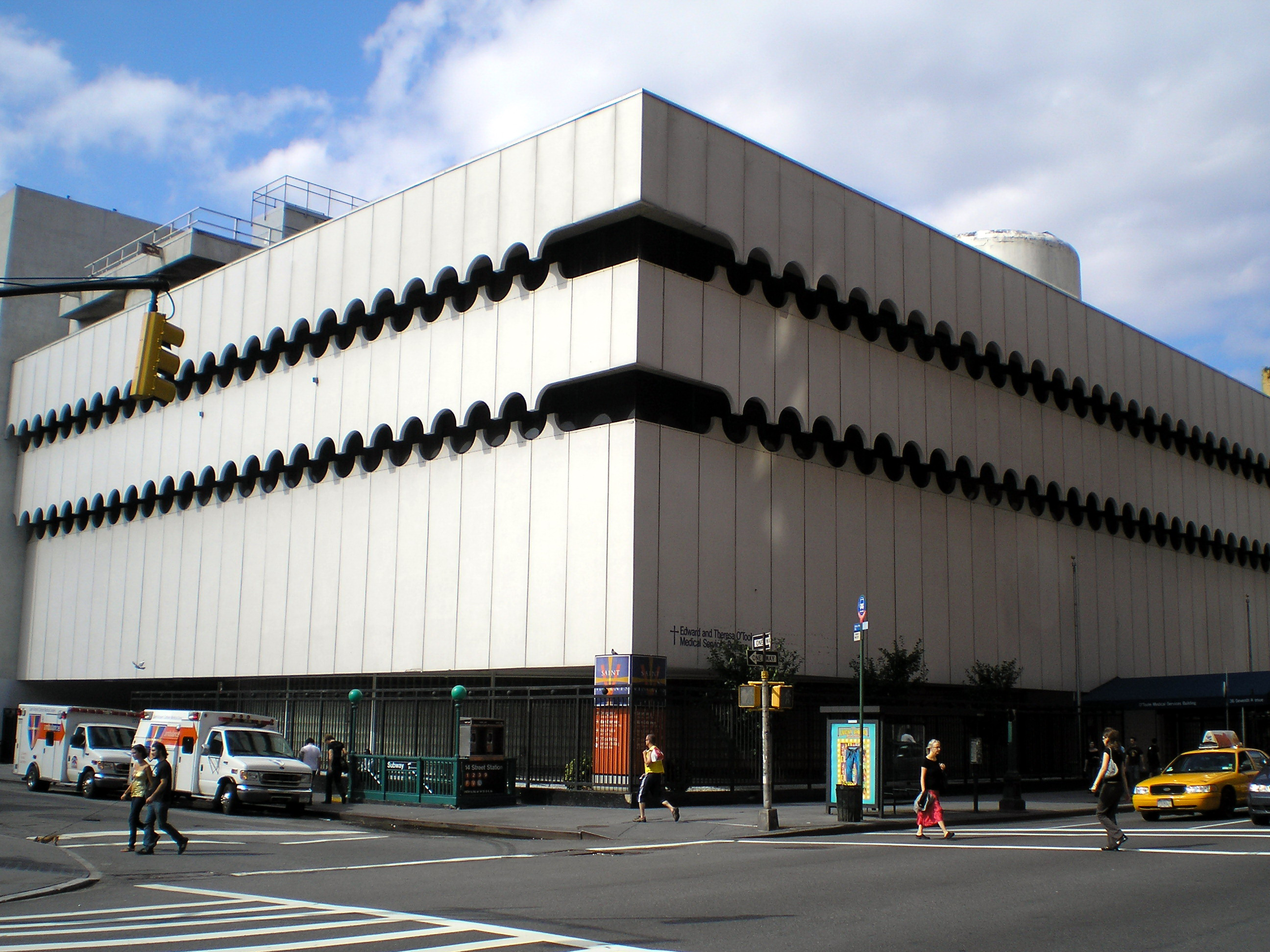
This building at Seventh Avenue between 12th Street and 13th Street, designed by Albert C. Ledner, was built in 1964 as the union's headquarters. The hiring halls were in the glass blocks on the ground floor. The union sold it to St. Vincent's Hospital in 1973, and it later became Lenox Health Greenwich Village.

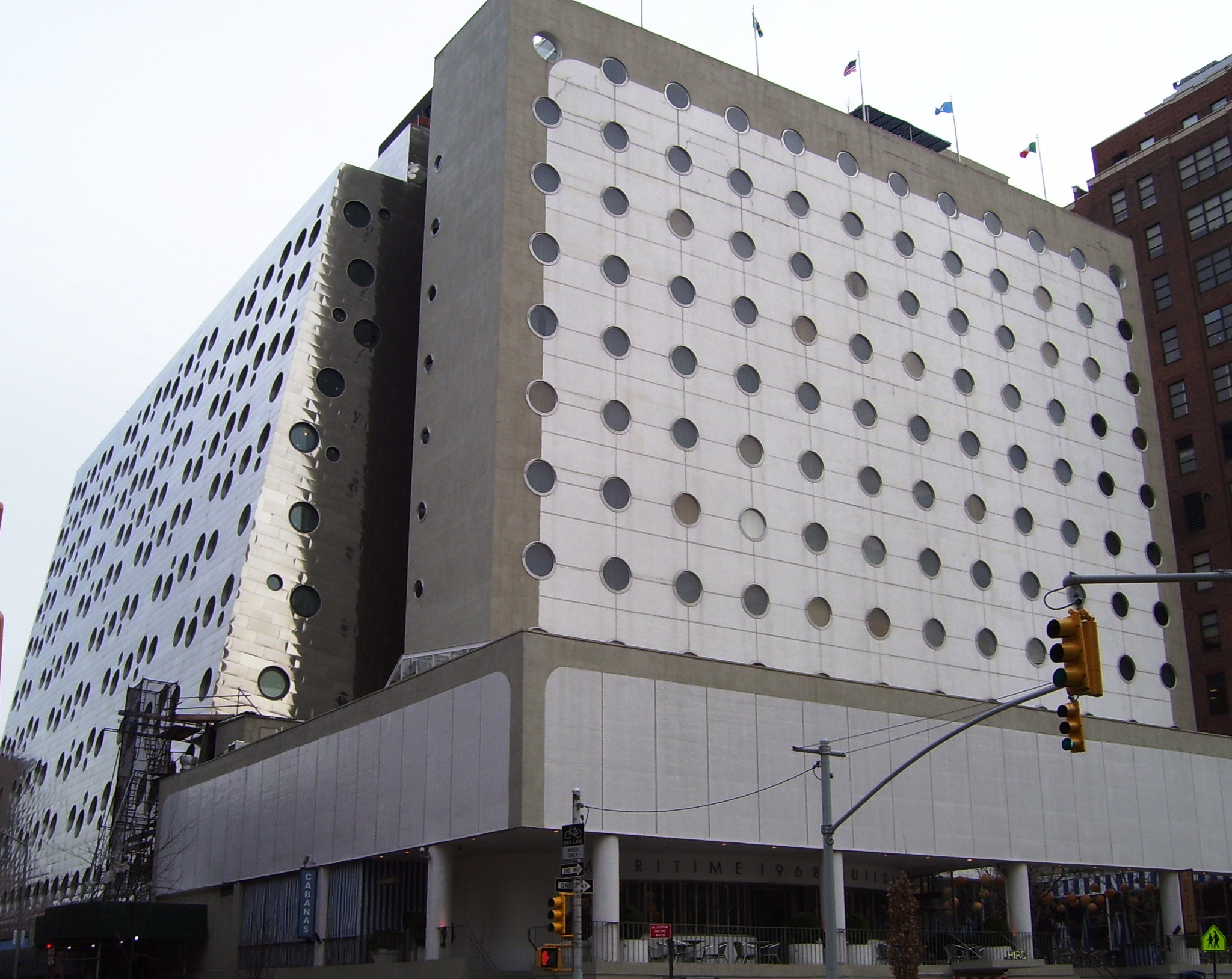
The Joseph Curran Annex (left) and Plaza (right), on Ninth Avenue between West 16th and 17th Streets, were built in 1966, also designed by Ledner. The Ninth Avenue building on the right is currently the Maritime Hotel, while the 17th Street building (left) is being converted into the Dream Downtown Hotel.

Immediately after the NMU's founding convention in July 1937, Curran and other seamen's union leaders were invited by John L. Lewis to come to Washington, D.C., to form a major organizing drive among ship and port workers. The unions comprised by the CIO had been ejected by the American Federation of Labor (AFL) in November 1936, and now Lewis wanted to launch a maritime union. His goal was to create a union as large and influential as the Steel Workers Organizing Committee out of the nation's 300,000 maritime workers. Although Lewis favored Harry Bridges, president of the Pacific Coast District of the International Longshoremen's Association, to lead the new maritime industrial union, the other union leaders balked. Curran agreed to affiliate with the CIO, but refused to let Bridges or anyone else take over his union. His views were reflected among those of the other union leaders, and the CIO's maritime industrial union never got off the ground.

By 1946, the NMU had 46 branches, a staff of 500, and 73,000 members.

In 1948, Lee Pressman joined Joseph Forer, a Washington-based attorney, in representing Ferdinand C. Smith, secretary of the National Maritime Union along with Gerhard Eisler, supposedly the top Soviet intelligence agent in the US, Irving Potash, vice president of the Fur and Leather Workers Union; Charles A. Doyle of the Gas, Coke and Chemical Workers Union, and John Williamson, labor secretary of the CPUSA). On May 5, 1946, Pressman and Forer received a preliminary injunction so their defendants might have hearings with examiners unconnected with the investigations and prosecutions by examiners of the Immigration and Naturalization Service.

== Expansion ==
In 1958 the union decided on an aggressive building program, and hired New Orleans–based architect Albert C. Ledner to design some unique buildings for them, including a headquarters building at Seventh Avenue between 12th Street and 13th Street, completed in 1964, a block-through service annex at 346 West 17th Street and a plaza and "pizza-box"-shaped companion building next to it on Ninth Avenue, both built in 1966 and both named for Joseph Curran. The Curran buildings held offices for the union and its pension fund, medical and training facilities, dormitory rooms for seaman, a gymnasium, swimming pool and 900-seat auditorium.

While federal contracting had been a practice since nearly the beginning of the formation of the United States the McNamara–O'Hara Service Contract Act had been signed in 1965 and had opened the doors to more privatization of work previously performed by government employees. The Act also provided regulations to ensure continuity of wages and fringe benefits with successor contractors as well as regulations to ensure that private employees did not have their right to organize infringed. Thousands of service jobs were now available to local residents and military dependents and, in 1967, the National Maritime Union identified a need amongst unorganized employees working on or in connection with the federal government to be unionized. This "shoreside division" of the NMU became known as the Industrial, Technical & Professional Employees Union (ITPE). While the National Maritime Union continued its operations as a maritime union, the ITPE grew into a sizable share of the NMU's total membership.

== Decline ==
In 1973, with the union's fortunes fading, in large part due to flag of convenience loopholes, and with the decreased activity in the Port of New York, the headquarters building was sold to St. Vincent's Hospital. The 17th Street and Ninth Avenue buildings were sold in 1987 to Covenant House, a drug rehabilitation program, for use as a runaway shelter and educational facility.

== Mergers ==
In 1988 the NMU agreed to merge with the Marine Engineers' Beneficial Association (MEBA) to form District 1, MEBA-NMU. The merger did not last. MEBA members charged that the merger referendum was rigged by MEBA president C. E. "Gene" DeFries. The accusations were serious enough that the United States Department of Justice began an investigation. Union members were even more outraged when they learned DeFries and five other union officers paid themselves more than $2 million in severance payments. During the course of their findings, a group of MEBA members (Led by Alex Shandrowsky, Jesse Calhoon, and Don Keefe) peacefully occupied MEBA's Headquarters in Washington, DC after DeFries refused to disclose information to union members. DeFries and others were later indicted for crimes relating to their manipulation of union elections and misuse of union offices. US versus DeFries (et al.) became the first successful criminal Racketeer Influenced and Corrupt Organizations Act (RICO) prosecution of the governing body of a labor organization, which resulted in the conviction of 18 officials of MEBA), for RICO, RICO conspiracy, embezzlement, extortion, and mail fraud. NMU disaffiliated from the Marine Engineers in 1993.

Louis Parise was elected the newly independent union's president.

In 1999 the NMU became an autonomous affiliate of the Seafarers International Union of North America, and in 2001 it fully merged with that union (now called "Seafarers International Union").

The Industrial, Technical & Professional Employees Union (ITPE) had grown exponentially since its inception in 1967, largely under the leadership of Louis Parise. The union also had an aggressive and robust administrative and legislative team, headed by Talmadge Simpkins. Between 1979 and 1986, the ITPE grew from six thousand covered workers to fourteen thousand five hundred. The ITPE had also developed three multi-employer plans, including a comprehensive medical plan known as the ITPEU Health and Welfare Plan, a defined contribution pension plan, and the Annual Benefit Fund. The ITPE continued to grow and, through the efforts of ITPE officers, staff, and union counsel, Ned Phillips and Sidney H. Kalban, became one of the premier unions representing contracted workers on or in connection with the federal government and played a large role in shaping law and policy for labor unions representing employees under the Service Contract Act.

The ITPE survived the merger of the NMU/SIU and continued as a local of MEBA until 2001, when it merged with the Office and Professional Employees International Union under then-president John F. Conley, who retired in 2013. Dennis R. Arrington assumed office that same year. The current president, John Brenton IV, was elected by acclamation in May 2025. As of 2025, the ITPE (now known as the ITPEU) represents 14,000 workers in 250 bargaining units across the country.

== Presidents ==
- Joseph Curran, (1937–1973)
- Shannon J. Wall, (1973–1990)
- Louis Parise, (1990–1997)
- Rene Lioanjie, (1997–2001)

== See also ==
- American Maritime Officers
- Marine Engineers' Beneficial Association
- Sailors' Union of the Pacific
- Seafarers International Union
- United States Merchant Marine
- Marine Firemen's Union
