= Piney Point, Maryland =

- Census-designated place
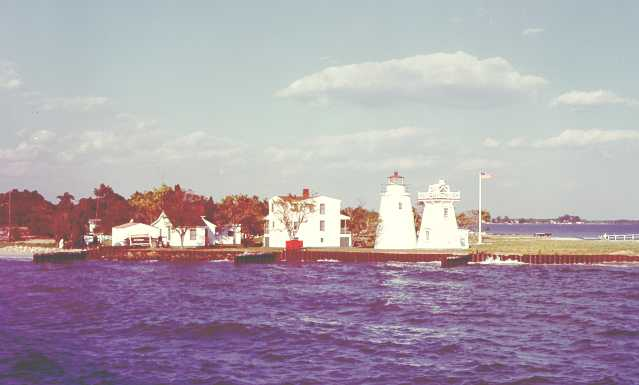
- Piney Point, in the 1950s or earlier

- Location within Maryland Location within the United States
- Coordinates: 38°08′32″N 76°30′27″W
- Country: United States
- State: Maryland

Area
  - Total: 1.88 sq mi (4.87 km^{2})
  - Land: 1.53 sq mi (3.96 km^{2})
  - Water: 0.35 sq mi (0.90 km^{2})

Population (2020)
  - Total: 980
  - Density: 640.2/sq mi (247.18/km^{2})
- Time zone: UTC−5 (Eastern (EST))
  - Summer (DST): UTC−4 (EDT)
- Area codes: 240 & 301
- FIPS code: 24-61875
- GNIS feature ID: 594876

Piney Point (also known simply as "The Point"), is an unincorporated community and census-designated place in St. Mary's County, Maryland, United States. It is known for the Paul Hall Center for Maritime Training and Education, houses along the beach, a lighthouse, and a museum. The Piney Point post office also serves St. George Island, which is connected to Piney Point by a short bridge.

== Demographics ==
Historical population
Census	Pop.	Note	%±
2020	980		—
U.S. Decennial Census

In 2021, Piney Point, MD had a population of 939 people with a median age of 42.5 and a median household income of $123,563. Between 2020 and 2021 the population of Piney Point, MD declined from 1,036 to 939, a −9.36% decrease.

== History ==
The scenic environment of Piney Point continues to be the summer getaway of many Washington D.C. notables. Named after the long-leaf yellow and loblolly pines lining the shores of the Potomac River, the Point provided a nature retreat for Presidents James Monroe, Franklin Pierce and Teddy Roosevelt. A number of other Capital figures such as Henry Clay, John C. Calhoun and Daniel Webster were frequent visitors to the Piney Point Hotel, which was shut down after a hurricane in 1933.

In the early 1940s Piney Point was also home to the U.S. Navy Torpedo Test Range. The Navy base was situated on the property, which is now the Paul Hall Center for Maritime Training. The small cottage-type homes located across from the maritime school were originally housing for Navy enlisted men and their families. The two-story homes along Stark Drive served as housing for Navy officers. The Navy base included a hospital, bowling alley, motor pool, and ships' dock. Many of the unmarried Navy members lived on large ships anchored in St. George Creek.
