= Maguire Act of 1895 =

- Other short titles: Act of February 18, 1895
- Long title: An Act to amend an Act entitled "An Act to amend the laws relative to shipping commissioners," approved August nineteenth, eighteen hundred and ninety, and for other purposes.
- Enacted by: the 53rd United States Congress
- Effective: February 18, 1895

Citations
- Public law: Chapter 97
- Statutes at Large: 28 Stat. 667

Codification
- Acts amended: Shipping Commissioners Act of 1872 · Act of August 19, 1890

Legislative history
- Introduced in the House as H.R. 5603 by D‑CA James G. Maguireth on January 31, 1894; Committee consideration by House Committee on Merchant Marine and Fisheries; Passed the House on July 20, 1894 (Voice vote); Passed the Senate on February 9, 1895 (Voice vote); Signed into law by President Grover Cleveland on February 18, 1895

Major amendments
- White Act of 1898

United States Supreme Court cases
- Robertson v. Baldwin (1897)

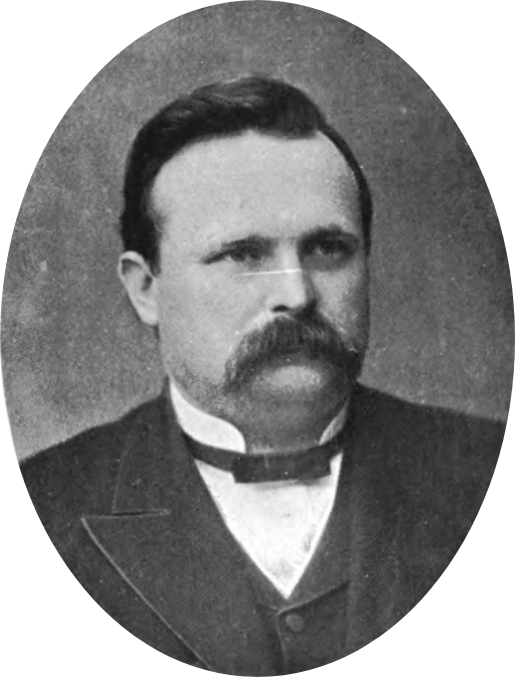
James G. Maguire

The Maguire Act of 1895 (28 Stat. 667, enacted February 18, 1895) is a United States Federal statute that abolished the practice of imprisoning sailors who deserted from coastwise vessels. The act was sponsored by representative James G. Maguire of San Francisco, California.

Before this legislation, a right to leave the ship existed only for a seaman who "correctly" believed his life to be in danger. This law extended the right in cases where the seaman feared physical abuse from other shipboard personnel.

== See also ==
- White Act of 1898
- Dingley Act of 1884
- Shanghaiing
- Maritime history of the United States
- Shipping Commissioners Act of 1872
