= Doell =

Doell is a surname. Notable people with the surname include:

- Karen Doell (born 1965), Canadian softball player
- Kevin Doell (born 1979), Canadian ice hockey player
- Paul Doell, American labor leader
- Richard Doell (1923–2008), American geophysicist

== See also ==
- Roell
