= Shanghaiing =

Kidnapping people to serve as sailors

Shanghaiing or crimping is the practice of kidnapping people to serve as sailors by coercive techniques such as trickery, intimidation, or violence. Those engaged in this form of kidnapping were known as crimps. The related term press gang refers specifically to impressment practices in the United Kingdom's Royal Navy.

== Etymology ==
The verb "shanghai" joined the lexicon with "crimping" and "sailor thieves" in the 1850s, possibly because Shanghai was a common destination of the ships with abducted crews. The term has since expanded to mean "kidnapped" or "induced to do something by means of fraud or coercion".

== Background ==
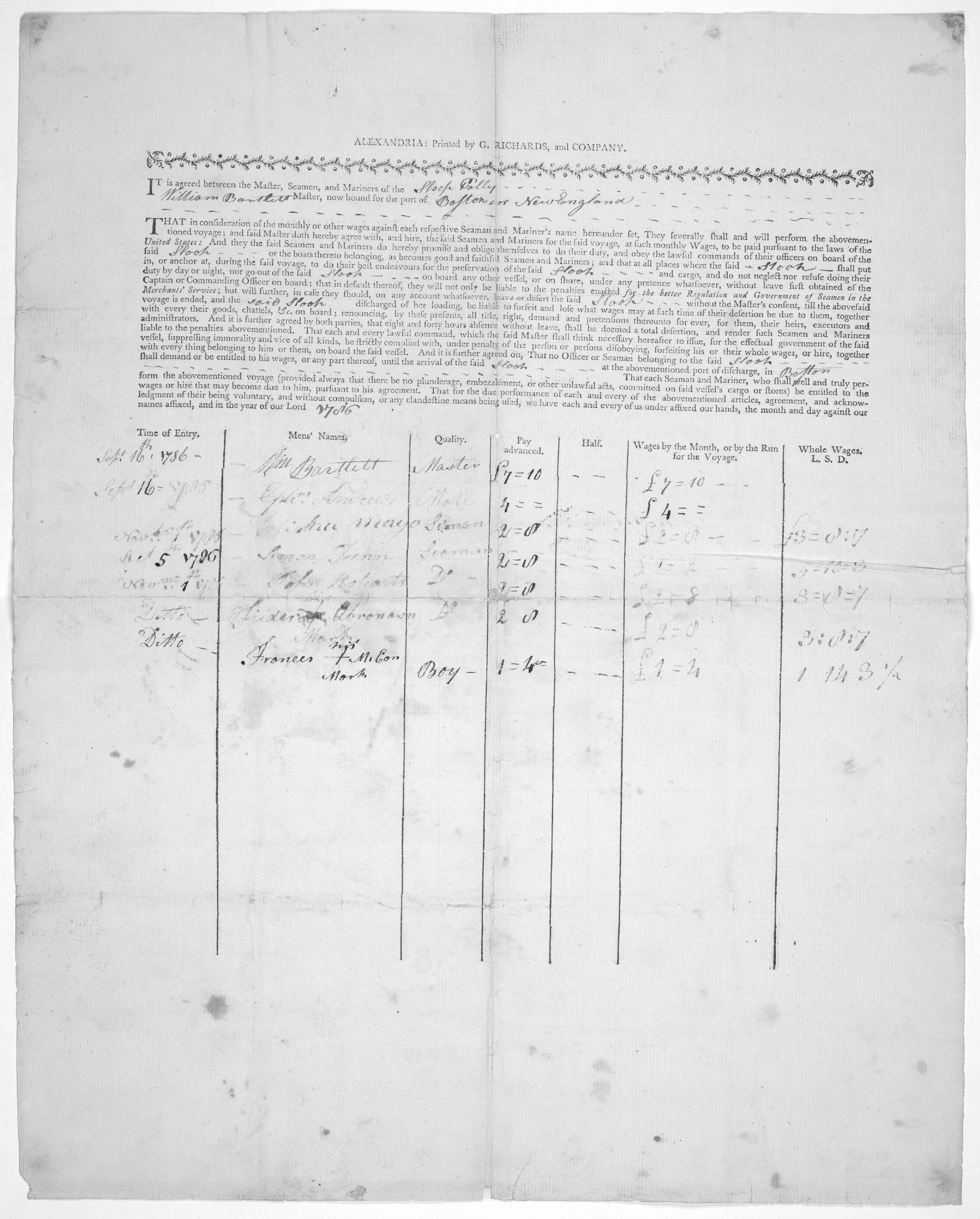
The shipping articles, or contract between the crew and the ship, from a 1786 voyage to Boston.

Crimps flourished in port cities like London and Liverpool in England and in San Francisco, Portland, Astoria, Seattle, Savannah, and Port Townsend in the United States. On the West Coast of the United States, Portland eventually surpassed San Francisco for shanghaiing. On the East Coast of the United States, New York had the most incidents, followed by Boston, Philadelphia, and Baltimore.

The role of crimps and the spread of the practice of shanghaiing resulted from a combination of laws, economic conditions, and the shortage of experienced sailors in England and on the American West Coast in the mid-19th century.

First, once an American sailor signed on board a vessel for a voyage, it was illegal for him to leave the ship before the voyage's end. The penalty was imprisonment, the result of federal legislation enacted in 1790 (this factor was mitigated by the Maguire Act of 1895 and the White Act of 1898, and finally abolished by the Seamen's Act of 1915).

Second, the practice was driven by a shortage of labor, particularly of skilled labor on ships on the West Coast. With crews abandoning ships en masse because of the California Gold Rush, a healthy body on board the ship was a boon.

Finally, shanghaiing was made possible by the existence of boarding masters, whose job was to find crews for ships. Boarding masters were paid "by the body", and thus had a strong incentive to place as many seamen on ships as possible. This pay was called "blood money", and was just one of the revenue streams available. These factors set the stage for the crimp: a boarding master who uses trickery, intimidation, or violence to put a sailor on a ship.

The most straightforward method for a crimp to shanghai a sailor was to render him unconscious, forge his signature on the ship's articles, and pick up his "blood money". This approach was widely used, but there were more profitable methods.

In some situations, the boarding master could receive the first two, three, or four months of wages of a man he shipped out. Sailors were able to get an advance against their pay for an upcoming voyage to allow them to purchase clothes and equipment, but the advance wasn't paid directly to the sailor because he could simply abscond with the money. Instead, those to whom money was owed could claim it directly from the ship's captain. An enterprising crimp, already dealing with a seaman, could supplement his income by supplying goods and services to the seaman at an inflated price, and collecting the debt from the sailor's captain.

Some crimps made as much as $9,500 per year (equivalent to $340,000 in 2025).

The crimps were well positioned politically to protect their lucrative trade.

Some examples included Jim "Shanghai" Kelly and Johnny "Shanghai Chicken" Devine of San Francisco, and Joseph "Bunko" Kelly of Portland.

== Ending the practice ==
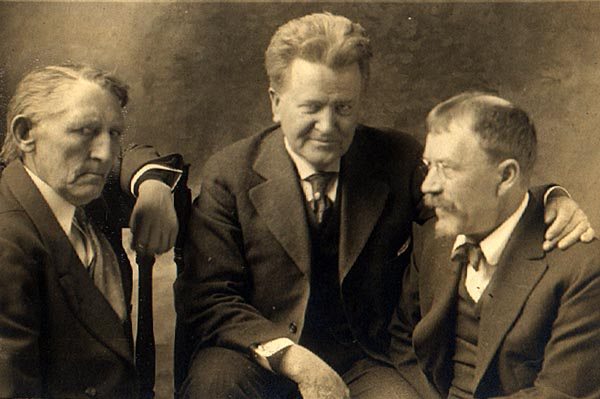
Andrew Furuseth (left) and Senator La Follette (center) were the architects of the Seamen's Act of 1915, pictured with muckraker Lincoln Steffens, c. 1915.

Demand for manpower to keep ships sailing to Alaska and the Klondike kept crimping a real danger into the early 20th century, but the practice was finally ended by a series of legislative reforms that spanned almost 50 years.

Before 1865, maritime labor laws primarily enforced stricter discipline on board ships. However, after 1865, this began to change. In 1868, New York State started cracking down on sailors' boardinghouses. They declined in number from 169 in 1863 to 90 in 1872. Then in 1871, Congress passed legislation to revoke the license of officers guilty of mistreating seamen.

In 1872, Congress passed the Shipping Commissioners Act of 1872 to combat crimps. Under this act, a sailor had to sign on to a ship in the presence of a federal shipping commissioner. The presence of a shipping commissioner was intended to ensure the sailor was not "forcibly or unknowingly signed on by a crimp".

In 1884, the Dingley Act came into effect. This law prohibited the practice of seamen taking advances on wages. It also limited the making of seamen's allotments to only close relatives. However, the crimps fought back. In 1886, a loophole to the Dingley Act was created, allowing boardinghouse keepers to receive seamen's allotments.

The widespread adoption of steam-powered vessels in the world's merchant marine services in the late 19th and early 20th centuries radically altered the economics of seafaring. Without acres of canvas to be furled and unfurled, the demand for unskilled labor greatly diminished (and, by extension, crimping). The sinking of the RMS Titanic, followed by the onset of World War I (which made the high seas a much more dangerous place due to the threat of submarine attack), provided the final impetus to stamp out the practice. In 1915, Andrew Furuseth and Senator Robert M. La Follette pushed through the Seamen's Act of 1915 that made crimping a federal crime, and finally put an end to it.

== Notable crimps ==
- Maxwell Levy, Port Townsend's Crimper King
- James "Shanghai" Kelly of San Francisco
- Johnny "Shanghai Chicken" Devine of San Francisco
- Joseph "Bunko" Kelly of Portland
- "One-Eyed" Curtin
- "Horseshoe" Brown
- Dorothy Paupitz of San Francisco
- Andy "Shanghai Canuck" Maloney of Vancouver
- Anna Gomes of San Francisco
- Thomas Chandler
- James Laflin
- Chris "Blind Boss" Buckley, the Democratic Party boss of San Francisco in the 1880s
- William T. Higgins, Republican Party boss of San Francisco in the 1870s and '80s
- "Shanghai Joe" of New Bedford, Mass.
- Tom Codd the Shanghai Prince of New Bedford, Mass.
- James Turk of Portland
- Billy Gohl, known as "the Ghoul of Grays Harbor", of Aberdeen, Washington (also a known serial killer)
- Tommy Moore of Buenos Aires

== See also ==
- Barbary Coast, San Francisco
- Blackbirding
- Clipper
- Froberg mutiny
- Impressment
- Involuntary servitude
- Maritime history of California
- Maritime history of the United States
- Shanghai tunnels (Portland, Oregon): Tunnels allegedly used to shanghai laborers for ships in the early 20th century
- Shanghaied in Astoria, a long-running musical comedy
- The Big Valley – "Barbary Red" episode of Season 1 of the drama series covers this topic.
- The Live Ghost – A 1934 comedy short film starring Stan Laurel and Oliver Hardy
- The Go Getter – A 1937 comedy starring George Brent and Charles Winninger
