= History of the United States Merchant Marine =

Part of American history

The maritime history of the United States is a broad theme within the history of the United States. As an academic subject, it crosses the boundaries of standard disciplines, focusing on understanding the United States' relationship with the oceans, seas, and major waterways of the globe. The focus is on merchant shipping, and the financing and manning of the ships. A merchant marine owned at home is not essential to an extensive foreign commerce. In fact, it may be cheaper to hire other nations to handle the carrying trade than to participate in it directly. On the other hand, there are certain advantages, particularly during time of war, which may warrant an aggressive government encouragement to the maintenance of a merchant marine.

== History ==
=== Early history ===
The maritime history of the United States goes back to the first successful English colony was established in 1607, on the James River at Jamestown. It languished for decades until a new wave of settlers arrived in the late 17th century and set up commercial agriculture based on exports of tobacco to England. Settlers brought horses, cattle, sheep and hogs as well as tools and the current technology to the Americas. From the very first days of the founding of the North American colonies shipbuilding was naturally one of the industries that chiefly engaged the attention of the colonists. At the time of the breaking out of the American Revolution and for a long time afterwards more of the people in New England were actually engaged in shipbuilding and ship sailing than in agriculture, even in spite of the restrictions imposed on the building of ships in the English colonies. The statement is made that at one time during this period Massachusetts was estimated to have one vessel for every hundred of its inhabitants. One out of every four signers of the Declaration of Independence was a shipowner or had been a ship captain.

==== The 18th century ====
As British colonists before 1776, American merchant vessels had enjoyed the protection of the Royal Navy. Major ports in the Northeast began to specialize in merchant shipping. The main cargoes included tobacco, as well as rice, indigo and naval stores from the Southern colonies. From the other colonies exports included horses, wheat, fish and lumber. By the 1760s New England was the center of a flourishing shipbuilding industry. Imports included all manner of manufactured goods.

==== Revolutionary War ====
The first war that an organized United States Merchant Marine took part in was the American Revolutionary War, which lasted from 1775 to 1783. In 1775 the Continental Congress and the various colonies issued Letters of Marque to privately owned, armed merchant ships known as privateers, which were outfitted as warships to prey on enemy merchant ships. They interrupted the British supply chain all along the eastern seaboard of the United States and across the Atlantic Ocean and the Merchant Marine's role in war began. This predates both the United States Coast Guard (1790) and the United States Navy (1797). During the American Revolution, American ships came under the aegis of France due to a 1778 Treaty of Alliance between the two countries.

==== 1783–1790 ====
By 1783, however, with the end of the Revolution, America became solely responsible for the safety of its own commerce and citizens. Without the means or the authority to field a naval force necessary to protect their ships in the Mediterranean against the Barbary pirates, the nascent U.S. government took a pragmatic, but ultimately self-destructive route. In 1784, the United States Congress allocated money for payment of tribute to the pirates.

Also in 1784, Boston navigators sailed to the Pacific Northwest and opened the U.S. fur trade.

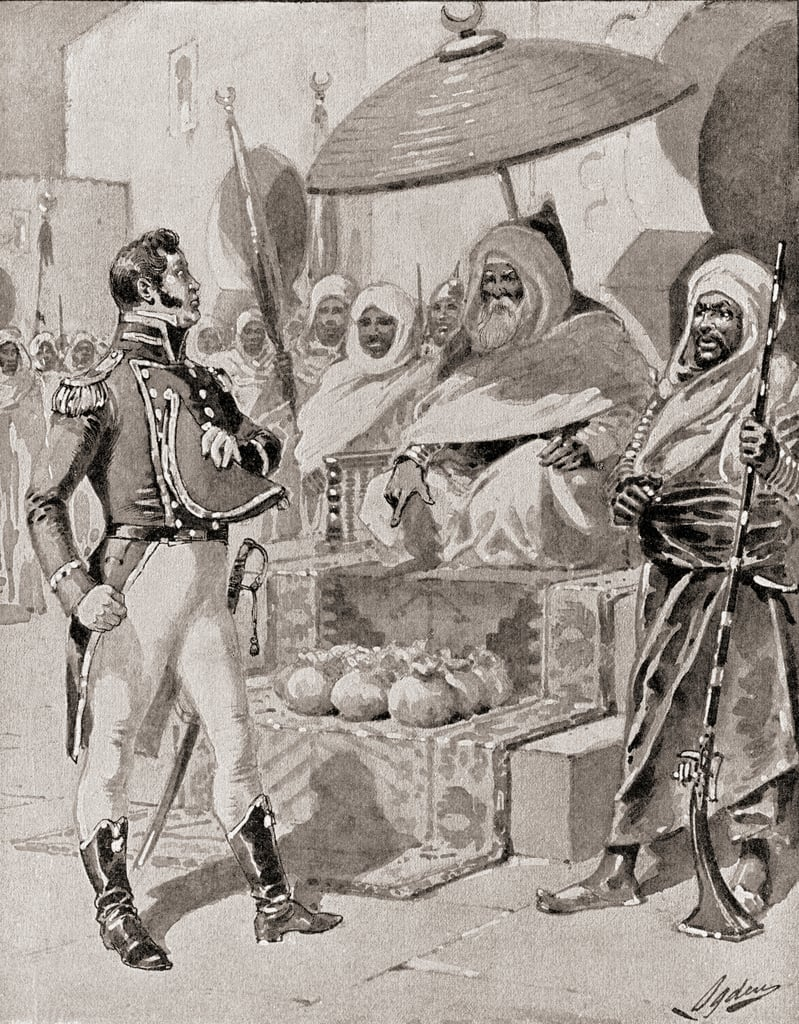
Captain William Bainbridge paying tribute to the Dey

In 1785, the Dey of Algiers took two American ships hostage and demanded US$60,000 in ransom for their crews. Then-ambassador to France Thomas Jefferson argued that conceding the ransom would only encourage more attacks. His objections fell on the deaf ears of an inexperienced American government too riven with domestic discord to make a strong show of force overseas. The U.S. paid Algiers the ransom, and continued to pay up to $1 million per year over the next 15 years for the safe passage of American ships or the return of American hostages. Payments in ransom and tribute to the privateering states amounted to 20 percent of United States government annual revenues in 1800.

Jefferson continued to argue for cessation of the tribute, with rising support from George Washington and others. With the recommissioning of the American navy in 1794 and the resulting increased firepower on the seas, it became more and more possible for America to say "no", although by now the long-standing habit of tribute was hard to overturn. A largely successful undeclared war with French privateers in the late 1790s showed that American naval power was now sufficient to protect the nation's interests on the seas. These tensions led to the First Barbary War in 1801.

The only clause in the treaty of peace (1783) concerning commerce was a stipulation guaranteeing that the navigation of the Mississippi should be forever free to the United States. John Jay at this time had tried to secure some reciprocal trade provisions with Great Britain, but without result. Pitt in 1783 introduced a bill into the British Parliament providing for free trade between the United States and British colonies, but the bill did not pass. Instead, Parliament enacted the Navigation Act 1783 which admitted only British-built ships and crewed ships to British West Indian ports and imposed heavy tonnage dues upon foreign ships in other British ports. This was amplified in 1786 by another act of Parliament designed to prevent the fraudulent registration of American vessels, and by still another act of Parliament in 1787 which prohibited the importation of American goods by way of foreign islands. The favorable features of the old Navigation Acts which had granted bounties and reserved the British markets in certain cases to colonial products were gone; the unfavorable alone were left. The British market was further curtailed by the depression there after 1783. Although the French treaty of 1778 had promised "perfect equality and reciprocity" in commercial relations, it was found impossible to make a commercial treaty upon this basis. Spain demanded as her price for reciprocal trading relations that the United States surrender for twenty-five years the right of navigating the Mississippi, a price which the New England merchants would have been glad to pay. France (1778) and the Dutch Republic (1782) made treaties, but not on even terms; Portugal refused the U.S. advances. Only Sweden (1783) and Prussia (1785) made treaties guaranteeing reciprocal commercial privileges.

The weakness of Congress under the Articles of Confederation prevented retaliation by the central government. Power was repeatedly asked to regulate commerce, but was refused by the states, upon whom rested the carrying out of such commercial treaties as Congress might negotiate. Eventually the states themselves attempted retaliatory measures, and during the years 1783–88, New Hampshire, Massachusetts, Rhode Island, New York, Pennsylvania, Maryland, Virginia, North Carolina, South Carolina, and Georgia levied tonnage dues upon British vessels or discriminating tariffs upon British goods. Whatever effect these efforts might have had were neutralized by the fact that the duties were not uniform, varying in different states from no tariffs whatever to duties of 100 percent. This simply drove British ships to the free or cheapest ports and their goods continued to flood the market. Commercial war between the states followed and turned futility into chaos.

The effect of this trade policy upon American shipping was detrimental. After the passage of the U.S. Constitution in 1789 the Congress was petitioned for relief. On June 5, 1789, a petition from the tradesmen and manufacturers of Boston was sent to the Congress which stated "that the great decrease of American manufactures, and almost total stagnation of American ship-building, urge us to apply to the sovereign Legislature of these States for their assistance to promote these important branches, so essential to our national wealth and prosperity. It is with regret we observe the resources of this country exhausted for foreign luxuries, our wealth expended for various articles which could be manufactured among ourselves, and our navigation subject to the most severe restrictions in many foreign ports, whereby the extensive branch of American ship-building is essentially injured, and a numerous body of citizens, who were formerly employed in its various departments, deprived of their support and dependence..." The congress responded with passage of the Tariff of 1789 which established tonnage rates favorable to American carriers by charging them lower cargo fees than those imposed on foreign boats importing similar goods. Coastal trade was reserved exclusively for American flag vessels.

In 1789, when the Constitution was adopted, the registered tonnage of the United States engaged in foreign trade was 123,893. During the next succeeding eight years it increased 384 percent.

==== The 1790s ====
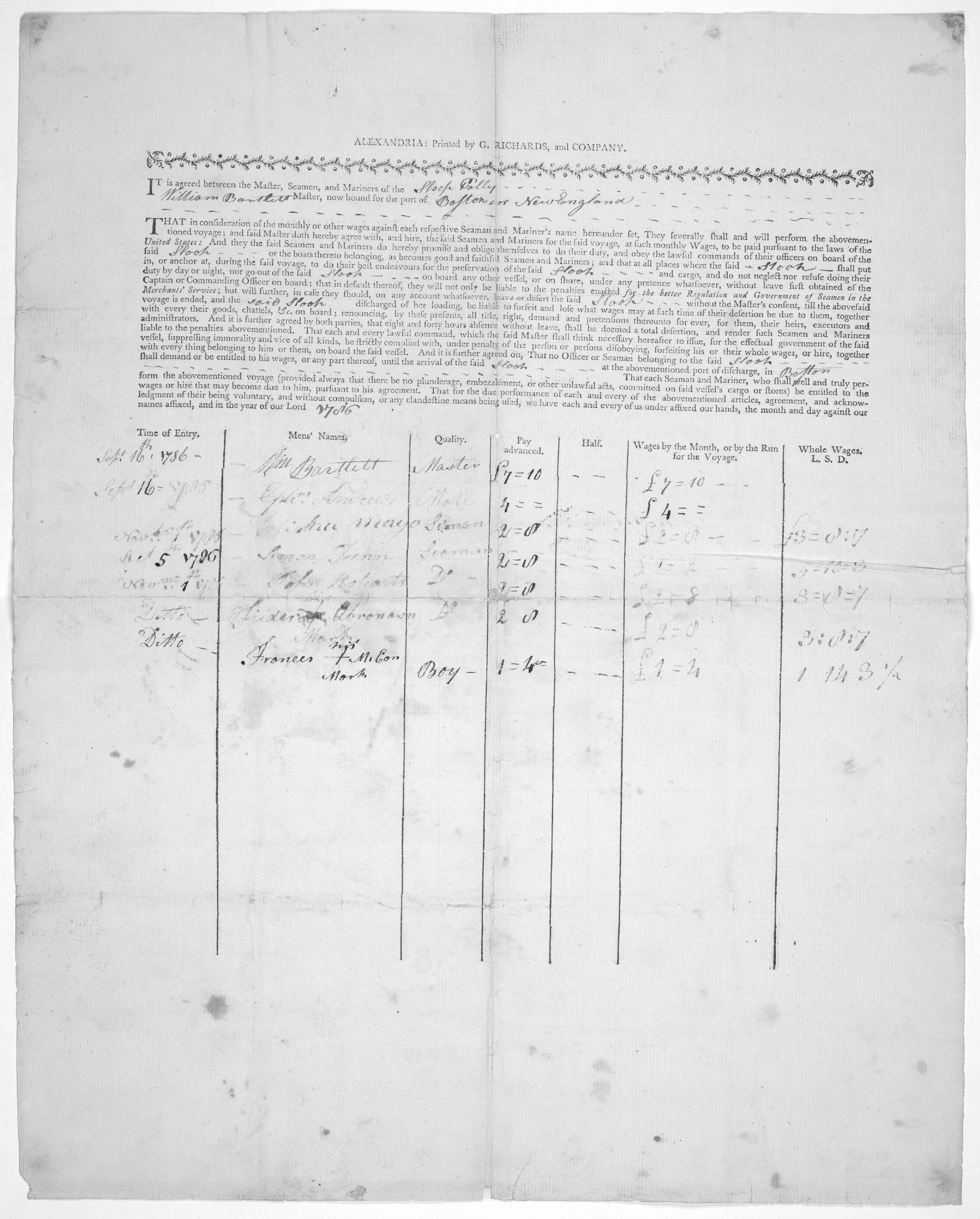
Shipping articles from a 1786 voyage to Boston. Articles is the nautical term for the contract between the crew and the ship.

In 1790, federal legislation was enacted pertaining to seamen and desertion. In 1796, federal legislation regarding Seaman's Protection Certificates (also known as Protection papers) was enacted. Immediately after the Revolutionary War the brand-new United States of America was struggling to stay financially afloat. National income was desperately needed and a great deal of this income came from import tariffs. Because of rampant smuggling, the need was immediate for strong enforcement of tariff laws, and on August 4, 1790, the United States Congress, urged on by Secretary of the Treasury Alexander Hamilton, created the Revenue-Marine, later renamed Revenue Cutter Service in 1862. It would be the responsibility of the new Revenue-Marine to enforce the tariff and all other maritime laws.

Although tangential to American maritime history, 1799 saw the fall of a colossus of the world's maritime history. The Dutch East India Company, established on March 20, 1602, when the Estates-General of the Netherlands granted it a 21-year monopoly to carry out colonial activities in Asia, formerly the world's largest company, became bankrupt, partly due to the rise of competitive free trade.

=== The 19th century ===
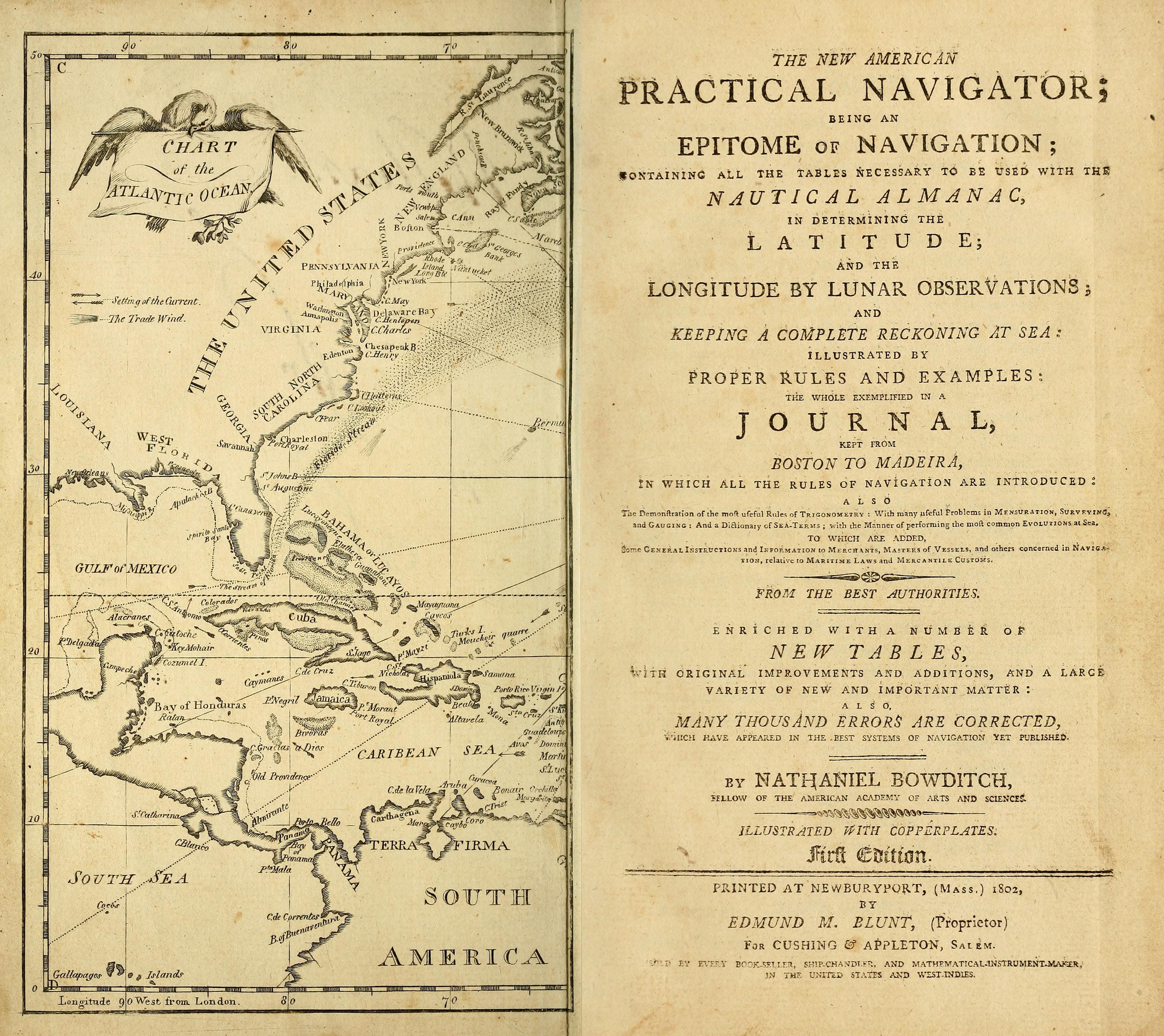
Frontispiece of the 1802 first edition of Bowditch's The New American Practical Navigator.

During the French Revolutionary and Napoleonic Wars, the Royal Navy aggressively reclaimed British deserters on board ships of other nations, both by halting and searching merchant ships, and in many cases, by searching American port cities. Thousands of sailors had deserted from the Royal Navy and found work onboard American merchantmen. The British navy was deeply angered that American authorities refused to return the deserters, and though many claimed to have acquired US citizenship, as papers proving these could be easily forged few Royal Navy officers believed them. As a result, in the 1790s and 1800s the British navy impressed approximately 6,000 alleged deserters off US merchantmen. This was one of the major factors leading to the War of 1812 in North America.

Commercial whaling in the United States was the center of the world whaling industry during the 18th and 19th centuries and was most responsible for the severe depletion of a number of whale species. New Bedford, Massachusetts and Nantucket Island were the primary whaling centers in the 19th century. In 1857, New Bedford had 329 registered whaling ships.

Robert Fulton ordered a Boulton and Watt steam engine, and built what he called the North River Steamboat (often mistakenly described as the Clermont). In 1807 this steamboat began a regular passenger boat service between New York City and Albany, New York, 240 km (150 mi) distant, which was a commercial success. In 1808 John and James Winans built Vermont in Burlington, Vermont, the second steamboat to operate commercially. In 1809, Accommodation, built by the Hon. John Molson at Montreal, and fitted with engines made in that city, was running successfully between Montreal and Quebec, being the first steamer on the St. Lawrence and in Canada. The experience of both vessels showed that the new system of propulsion was commercially viable, and as a result its application to the more open waters of the Great Lakes was next considered. That idea went on hiatus, due to the War of 1812, however.

As a result of rising American tensions with Britain, a number of laws collectively known as the Embargo Act of 1807 were enacted. Britain and France were at war; the U.S. was neutral and trading with both sides. Both sides tried to hinder American trade with the other. Jefferson's goal was to use economic warfare to secure American rights, instead of military warfare. Initially, these acts sought to coerce Britain into abandoning its practise of interfering with US overseas trade. The later Embargo Acts, particularly those of 1807–1808 period, were passed in an attempt to stop American citizens from defying the embargo and trading with British subjects. Both Acts were ultimately unsuccessful, damaging the US economy more so than Britain's, and were repealed at the end of Jefferson's second, and last, term. A modified version of these Acts would return for a brief time in 1813 under the presidential administration of Jefferson's successor, James Madison.

The African slave trade became illegal on January 1, 1808.

By 1807 the tonnage registered in the United States engaged in foreign trade had increased to 848,307.

==== War of 1812 ====
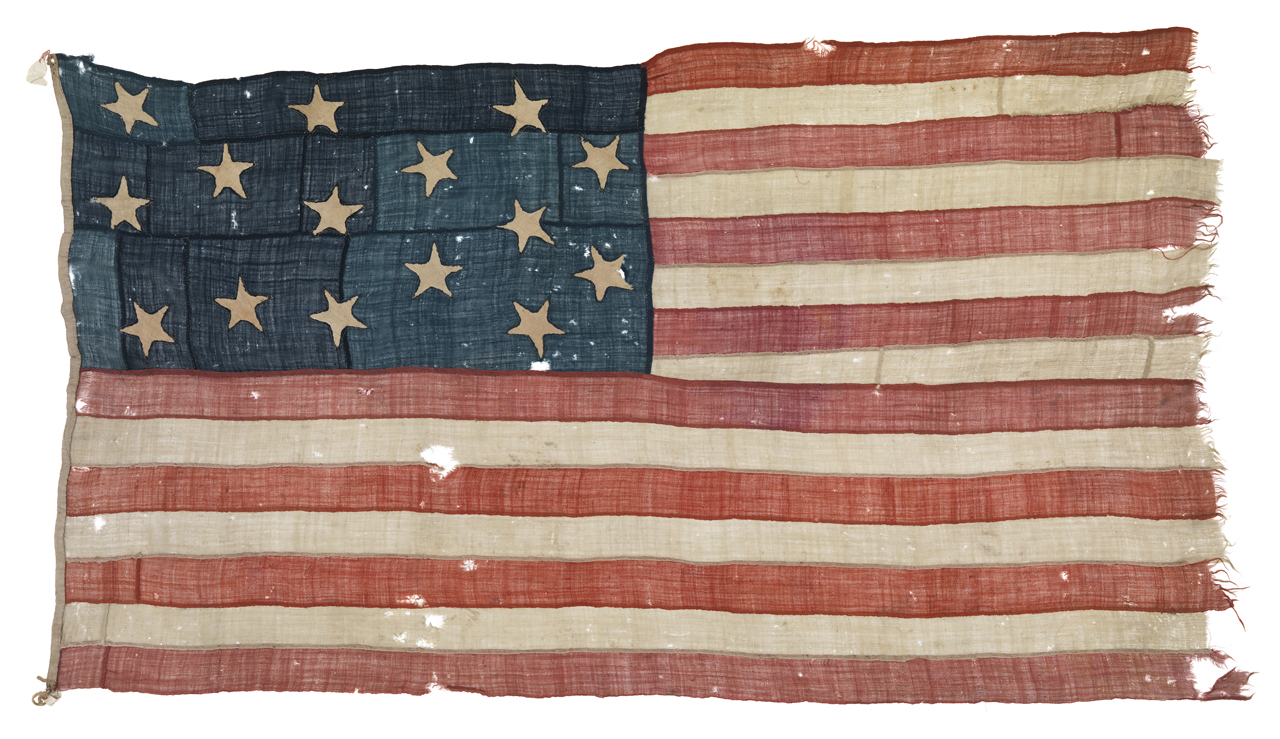
Civil ensign of an American merchant brig captured by HMS Borer during the War of 1812

The United States declared war on Britain on June 18, 1812. The origins of the War of 1812 have been debated upon, but are generally agreed to have stemmed from impressment of sailors aboard US merchantmen, American desires to annex Canada, British restrictions on American trade with France and its allies, and Britain's support for Indian tribes resisting US expansion into the American Midwest. Britain offered to rescind the trade restrictions, but this arrived after the US declared war. American war hawks turned the conflict into what they called a "second war for independence". Part of the American strategy was deploying several hundred privateers to attack British merchant ships, which hurt British commercial interests, especially in the West Indies.

==== Clipper ships ====
In the United States the term "clipper" referred to the Baltimore clipper, a type of topsail schooner that was developed in Chesapeake Bay before the American Revolution and was lightly armed in the War of 1812, sailing under Letters of Marque and Reprisal, when the type—exemplified by the Chasseur, launched at Fells Point, Baltimore, 1814— became known for its incredible speed; a deep draft enabled the Baltimore clipper to sail close to the wind (Villiers 1973). Clippers, outrunning the British blockade of Baltimore, came to be recognized as ships built for speed rather than cargo space; while traditional merchant ships were accustomed to average speeds of under 5 knots (9.3 km/h), clippers aimed at 9 knots (17 km/h) or better. Sometimes these ships could reach 20 knots (37 km/h).

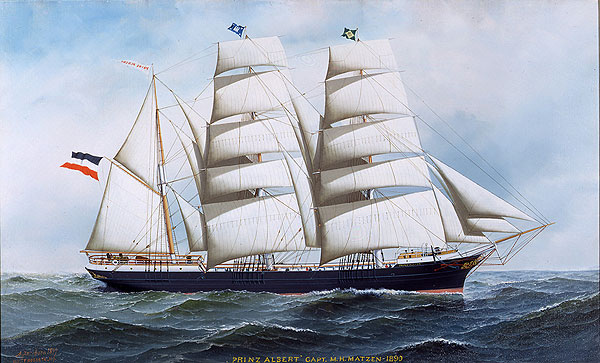
"The Prinz Albert," 1897, by Antonio Jacobsen

Clippers were built for seasonal trades such as tea, where an early cargo was more valuable, or for passenger routes. The small, fast ships were ideally suited to low-volume, high-profit goods, such as spices, tea, people, and mail. The values could be spectacular. The Challenger returned from Shanghai with "the most valuable cargo of tea and silk ever to be laden in one bottom." The competition among the clippers was public and fierce, with their times recorded in the newspapers. The ships had low expected lifetimes and rarely outlasted two decades of use before they were broken up for salvage. Given their speed and maneuverability, clippers frequently mounted cannon or carronade and were often employed as pirate vessels, privateers, smuggling vessels, and in interdiction service.

==== 1815–1830 ====
During the 18th century, ships carrying cargo, passengers and mail between Europe and America would sail only when they were full, but in the early 19th century, as trade with America became more common, schedule regularity became a valuable service. Starting in 1818, ships of the Black Ball Line began regularly scheduled trips between Britain and America. These "packet ships" (named for their delivery of mail "packets") were infamous for keeping to their disciplined schedules. This often involved harsh treatment of seamen and earned the ships the nickname "bloodboat". During the 1820s American whalers start flocking to the Pacific, resulting in more contact with the Hawaiian Islands.

Because of the influence of whaling and several local droughts, there was substantial migration from Cape Verde to America, most notably to New Bedford, Massachusetts. This migration built strong ties between the two locations, and a strong packet trade between New England and Cape Verde developed during the early to mid-19th century. The Erie Canal was started in 1817 and finished in 1825, encouraging inland trade and strengthening the position of the port of New York.

Although the amount of tonnage registered in foreign trade did not equal that of the years 1815-17 or the figures of the next two decades, the proportion of American carriage in the foreign trade reached 92.5 percent in 1826, a larger percentage than has been attained before or since. Not only were we carrying practically all of our own goods, but the reputation of Yankee ship builders for turning out models which surpassed in speed, strength, and durability any vessels to be found, brought about the sale between 1815 and 1840 of 540,000 tons of shipping to foreigners. Not withstanding higher wages, it cost less to run an American vessel, for a smaller crew was carried. Of the world's total whaling fleet in 1842, it was estimated that of 882 ships 652 were American vessels.

==== The 1830s ====
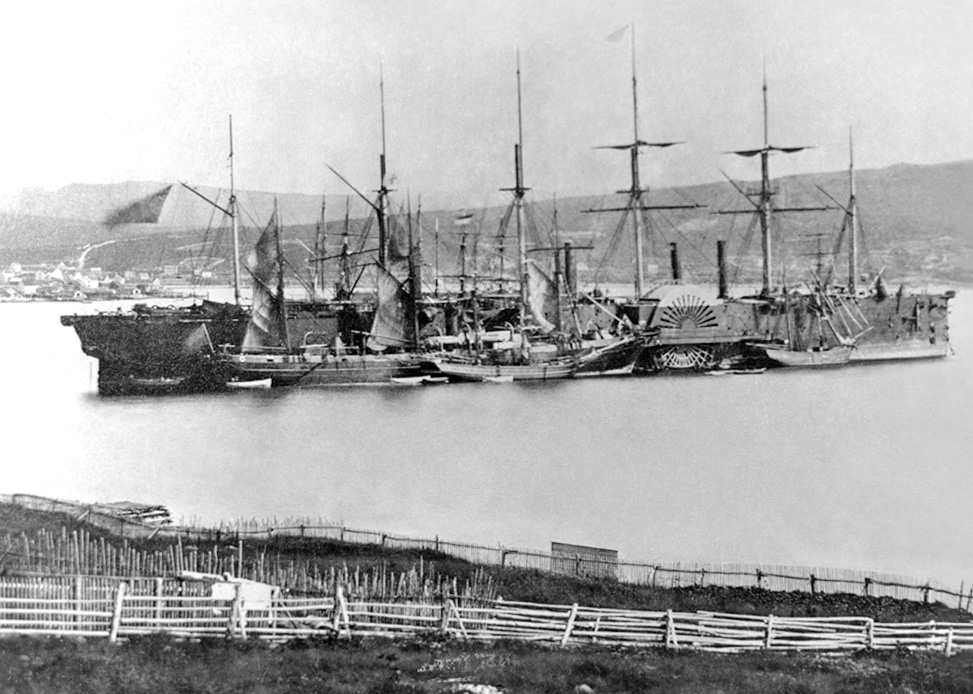
SS Great Eastern

In 1832, Secretary of the Treasury Louis McLane ordered in writing for revenue cutters to conduct winter cruises to assist mariners in need, and Congress made the practice an official part of regulations in 1837. This was the beginning of the lifesaving mission that the later U.S. Coast Guard would be best known for worldwide. The side-wheel paddle steamer SS Great Western was the first purpose-built steamship to initiate regularly scheduled trans-Atlantic crossings, starting in 1838.

The record times of these steam ships (the Atlantic crossing to New York in thirteen and a half days) proved that steamers could make the trip in shorter time than the fastest sailing packet. The British government was farsighted enough to realize that the motive power of the immediate future was steam, and in 1839 heavily subsidized the Cunard Line, which began its career in 1840 with four side-wheeled wooden ships. The British Government, therefore, readily aided Samuel Cunard, as it did other owners, granting him a subsidy of $425,000 a year to carry the mails back and forth between Liverpool, Halifax, and Boston, with an occasional visit to Quebec. This policy of subsidization, which was continued to at least WW II by Great Britain, aided materially not only in giving her maritime interests a start in the new type of ships, but in helping them win and hold supremacy on the ocean. The Peninsular Company, afterwards the Peninsular and Oriental Steam Navigation Company, was established in 1837, and the Pacific Steam Navigation Company in 1840, both subsidized.

==== The 1840s ====
The first regular steamship service from the west to the east coast of the United States began on February 28, 1849, with the arrival of the SS California (1848) in San Francisco Bay. California left New York Harbor on October 6, 1848, rounded Cape Horn at the tip of South America, and arrived at San Francisco, California after a 4-month 21-day journey. SS Great Eastern was built in 1854–1857 with the intent of linking Great Britain with India, via the Cape of Good Hope, without coaling stops; she would know a turbulent history, and was never put to her intended use.

The years leading up to the Civil War were characterized by extremely rapid production in ship building. The 538,136 tons registered in foreign trade in 1831 had increased to 1,047,454 in 1847 and to 2,496,894 in 1862, a figure which represented the culmination of our shipbuilding tonnage until surpassed in WW I. From 1848 to 1858 ship building had been maintained at an average of 400,000 tons a year. This construction was caused by two conditions, the development of the clipper ship after 1845 and the increased demand for shipping.

Designed for speed, the clipper was built on sharp lines and carried a maximum of canvas and was the culmination of the intense rivalry between steam and canvas. It was intended primarily for long voyages, and was used especially for the California and Far Eastern trade. Given a fair breeze, a clipper ship could outdistance a steamship. It was not uncommon for a clipper to sail over 300 miles a day; the Flying Cloud (clipper) on a ninety-day run to San Francisco made 374 miles in one day. The Comet (clipper), on an eighty-day voyage from San Francisco to New York averaged 210 miles a day. It appeared that the American ship builder, before he relinquished his supremacy, was intent upon demonstrating to what heights of efficiency and speed a sailing ship could attain.

The increased demand for shipping was the result of several factors. The discovery in 1848 of gold in California was a major cause along with the wars between Great Britain and China in 1840–42 and 1856–60 threw a part of the China trade into American hands. The revolutionary outbreaks of 1848 interrupted European trade, with a resultant benefit to Americans, while the Crimean War, which occupied many European boats in transporting troops and supplies, gave new openings to American ships. In addition the natural growth in population, wealth, and production necessitated increased shipping.

The volume of mail between the United States and Europe increased substantially during this period, and the capacity of the sailboat to deliver this mail efficiently and within a reasonable time was uncertain. Following the precedent established by England and other maritime nations, the federal government began its aid to ocean shipping with the overseas mail service. On March 3, 1845, Congress authorized the Postmaster General to invite bids on contracts to carry mail between the United States and abroad. Regular subsidized service between New York and Bremen, Havre, Liverpool and Panama was established under the Act of 1845. Subsidy payments averaged between $19,250 and $35,000 per round trip, and aggregated government expenditures to 1858 amounted to $14,400,000.

This development led to the formation of the U.S. Mail Steamship Company and the Pacific Mail Steamship Company.

==== The 1850s ====
The gradual substitution of steam for sailing vessels coincided with the substitution of iron (and later steel) hulls for those made from wood. An abundance of coal and iron close to the sea, growing number of skilled mechanics, and abundant labor pool provided the United Kingdom with a comparative advantage: by 1853, one-fourth of the tonnage built in the UK were steamships, or which more than 25% were built of iron. In the same year, 22% of US tonnage was constructed for steamships, but scarcely any iron ships were built here.

There was a decidedly unhealthy element to this remarkable activity in ship building. In the first place the demand from Europe because of the Crimean War was abnormal; between 1854 and 1859 the European nations were buying 50,000 tons of shipping as against 10,000 tons in normal years. Unfortunately, this increase in the building of sailing ships came at a time when their days were numbered, for between 1850 and 1860 the share of ocean freight carried by steamers increased from 14 to 28 percent. When the abnormal demand for sailing ships should let up, as it did in 1858, it meant that shipyards built and equipped for the production of wooden ships and shipwrights trained for a type no longer wanted would be idle, while foreign shipyards already engaged in the building of the iron steamship would be in a decidedly superior position. The panic of 1857 precipitated the crash. In 1858 ship building, which had been maintained for the preceding years at an average of 400,000 tons a year dropped to 244,000 and in 1859 to 156,000. At that time the combined imports and exports carried in American bottoms was steadily declining, only 65.2 percent being carried in 1861 as against 92.5 percent in 1826. Another factor in the decline of American ship building was a fundamental economic change in progress throughout the United States. Capital was finding new and more profitable fields for investment. Manufacturing, which grew rapidly after the War of 1812, absorbed some of it; while considerable amounts were drawn into such internal improvements as canals and railways. Between 1820 and 1838 the states contracted debts of over $110,000,000 for the building of roads, canals, and railroads; from 1830 to 1860 over 30,000 miles of railroad were built, most of the capital coming from private investors. The minds of the venturous and ambitious turned from the sea to the unexploited West, and capital turned from ship building to the development of natural resources.

In 1852, the lighthouse board established and published first Light List and Notice to Mariners. In 1854, Andrew Furuseth was born in Norway, and Western river engineers form a "fraternal organization" that is a precursor to the Marine Engineers' Beneficial Association. Also, Commodore Matthew Calbraith Perry established trade relations with Japan with the signing of the Convention of Kanagawa. In 1857, New Bedford had 329 registered whaling ships. The discovery of petroleum in Titusville, Pennsylvania, on August 27, 1859, by Edwin L. Drake was the beginning of the end of commercial whaling in the United States as kerosene, distilled from crude oil, replaced whale oil in lamps. Later, electricity gradually replaced oil lamps, and by the 1920s, the demand for whale oil had disappeared entirely.

Clipper ship sailing card for the "Free Trade," printed by Nesbitt & Co., New York, early 1860s

Decline in the use of clippers started with the economic slump following the Panic of 1857 and continued with the gradual introduction of the steamship. Although clippers could be much faster than the early steamships, clippers were ultimately dependent on the vagaries of the wind, while steamers could reliably keep to a schedule. The steam clipper was developed around this time, and had auxiliary steam engines which could be used in the absence of wind. An example of this type was the Royal Charter, built in 1857 and wrecked on the coast of Anglesey in 1859.

In 1859, the "Memphis and St. Louis Packet Line," which would later become the Anchor Line was formed, principally providing service to these two cities and points in between. The Anchor line was a steamboat company that operated a fleet of boats on the Mississippi River between St. Louis, Missouri, and New Orleans, Louisiana, between 1859 and 1898, when it went out of business. It was one of the most well-known, if not successful, pools of steamboats formed on the lower Mississippi River in the decades following the American Civil War.

==== The 1860s ====
The final blow to clipper ships came in the form of the Suez Canal, opened in 1869, which provided a huge shortcut for steamships between Europe and Asia, but which was difficult for sailing ships to use.

===== Civil War era =====
Merchant shipping was a key target in the U.S. Civil War. For example, the CSS Alabama, a Confederate sloop-of-war commissioned on 24 August 1862, spent months capturing and burning ships in the North Atlantic and intercepting grain ships bound for Europe. Other Confederate commerce raiders included the CSS Sumter, CSS Florida, and CSS Shenandoah.

The elements contributing to the decline of the merchant marine were already operative before the Civil War, and the result would undoubtedly have been the same if that conflict had not come. The war, however, accentuated a tendency already existing and dealt a blow from which the merchant marine failed to recover until artificially revived during World War I. In 1861 registered American tonnage in foreign trade amounted to 2,496,894 tons and in 1865 to 1,518,350, while the percent of imports and exports carried in American ships dropped in the same years from 66.2 to 27.7. The decrease of tonnage in these years of some 900,000 tons was chiefly due to two causes. The first of these was the loss sustained from Confederate cruisers such as the Alabama built and fitted out in England contrary to the laws of warfare. The second and most important was the sale during the four years 1862–65 of 751,595 tons of shipping abroad, occasioned by (1) lack of confidence, decline in profits due to continual Confederate captures and high insurance rates, and (2) decline in export business due to the cessation of cotton shipments abroad.

A second round of ocean-mail contracts was authorized by Congress on May 28, 1864. Pursuant to the provisions of this Act, the United States and Brazil entered into a ten-year contract for monthly voyages between the United States and South America. Of the $250,000 annual subsidy requirement, the United States contributed $150,000 and Brazil $100,000. Subsequent subsidies to various individual American flag lines amounted to approximately $6,500,000 between 1864 and 1877. Efforts by the Pacific Mail Steamship Company to increase its subsidies and the political scandals that grew out of these efforts, caused the Government to abrogate all subsidies to the Lines. Little more was done by the Government until the passage of the Ocean Mail Act in 1891.

===== 1866–1870 =====
First West Coast attempt at unionizing merchant seamen with the "Seamen's Friendly Union and Protective Society." The union quickly dissolves.

The Civil War dealt the merchant marine a blow from which it never recovered except for the assistance of government intervention in World War I and later. Destruction by Confederate privateers and large sales abroad decreased the amount of tonnage. Delay in adopting iron steam-driven ships gave British builders an advantage which they continued to hold. But more important than all else was that more profitable investments in internal transportation and the exploration of raw materials in the great industrial age which dawned after the war drew capital away from the sea. Lack of government interest helped complete the downfall of American shipping.

The five years following the Civil War showed a slight revival but the forces tending to a decline continued operative. American shipping in foreign trade and the fisheries, which amounted to 2,642,628 tons in 1870, had dropped to 826,694 tons in 1900. In 1860 the percentage of imports and exports carried in American ships was 66.5, but this dropped in 1870 to 35.6, in 1880 to 13, in 1890 to 9.4, in 1900 to 7.1.

==== The 1870s ====
By 1870, a number of inventions, such as the screw propeller and the triple expansion engine made trans-oceanic shipping economically viable. Thus began the era of cheap and safe travel and trade around the world. Starting in 1873, deck officers were required to pass mandatory license examinations. In 1874, the New York Nautical School was founded as a means of training young men for careers at sea in the postwar merchant marine, becoming the first school of its type in the United States. It would later become the State University of New York Maritime College. Also in 1874, the union that would become the Marine Engineers' Beneficial Association formed. The Buffalo Association of Engineers began corresponding with other marine engineer associations around the country. These organizations held a convention in Cleveland, Ohio including delegates from Buffalo, New York, Cleveland, Ohio, Detroit, Michigan, Chicago, Illinois and Baltimore, Maryland. This organization called itself the National Marine Engineers Association and chose as its president Garret Douw of Buffalo. On February 23, 1875 MEBA was formed. As of 1876, Plimsoll marks were required on all U.S. vessels

==== The 1880s ====
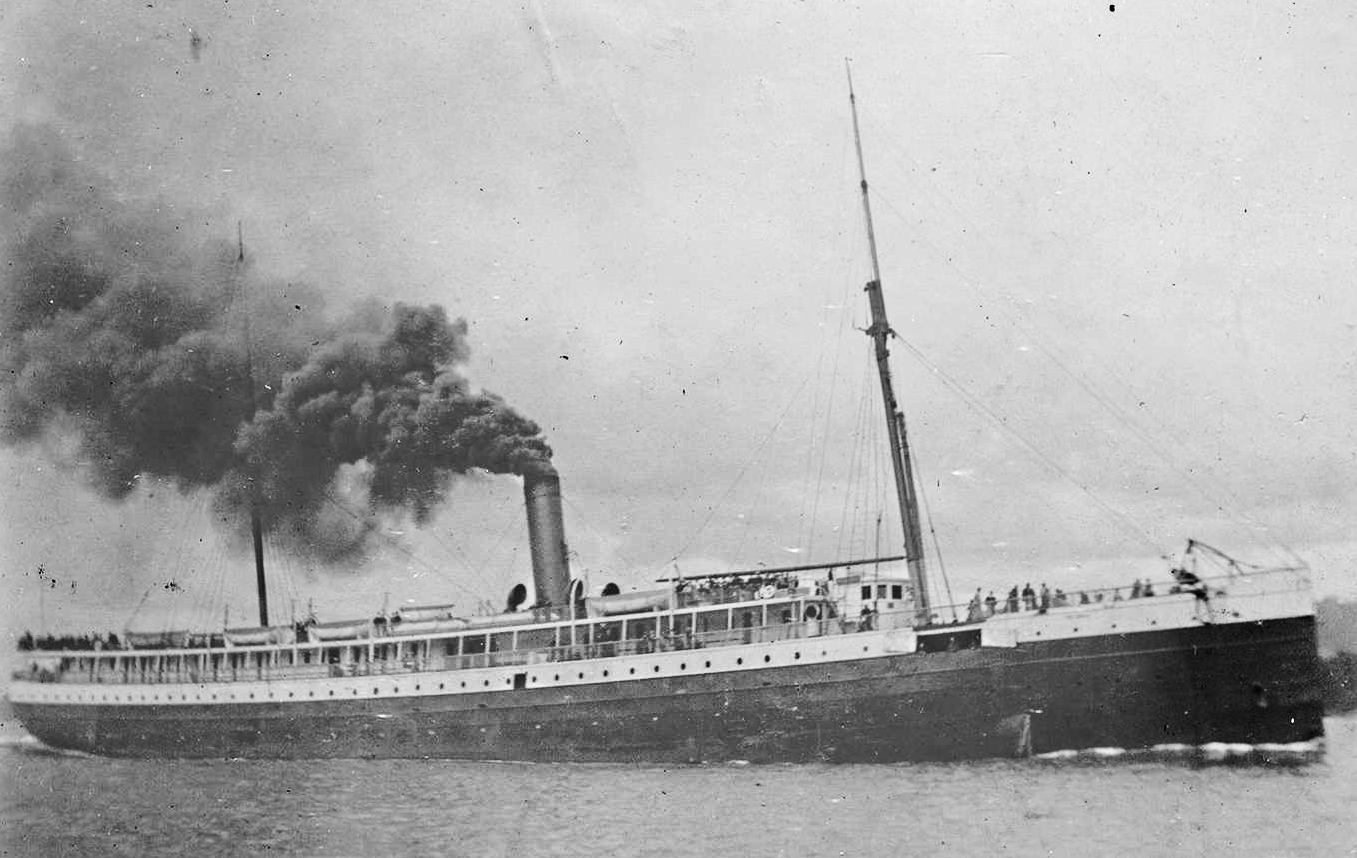
The passenger steamship Columbia.

In 1880, passenger steamship Columbia of the Oregon Railroad and Navigation Company became the first outside usage of Thomas Edison's incandescent light bulb and the first ship to use a dynamo. The Sailors' Union of the Pacific (SUP) founded on March 6, 1885, in San Francisco, California is an American labor union of mariners, fishermen and boatmen working aboard U.S. flag vessels. At its fourth meeting in 1885, the fledgling organization adopted the name Coast Sailor's Union and elected George Thompson its first president. Andrew Furuseth, who had joined the union on June 3, 1885, was elected to its highest office in January 1887. In 1889 he returned to sea but was reelected to the position of union secretary in 1891. The American Federation of Labor (AFL) was founded in 1886 by Samuel Gompers as a national federation of skilled workers' unions. Several maritime unions would affiliate with the AFL. In 1887, the Merchant Marine and Fisheries Committee was formed.

==== The 1890s ====
On March 3, the Ocean Mail Act of 1891 provided for mail-subsidy payments to various classes of steamships and inaugurated a trade-route system which remained basically unchanged up to the present day. Under the Act's directive to "subserve and promote the postal and commercial interest of the United States," the Postmaster General invited bids under which contracts were subsequently awarded on routes which varied in number from four to nine. The Act remained in effect until 1923, and total subsidy in the form of mail payments totaled $29,630,000.

Also in 1891, a maritime school now known as The Massachusetts Maritime Academy opened up in Buzzards Bay Massachusetts. On July 29, 1891, Andrew Furuseth merged the Coast Seamen's Union with the Steamship Sailor's Union to form the new Sailors' Union of the Pacific. With the exception of a two-month period when he shipped out as a fisherman, Furuseth was secretary of the SUP until 1935. Originally formed as the National Union of Seamen of America in 1892 in Chicago, Illinois, the organization was a federation of independent unions, including the Sailors' Union of the Pacific, the Lake Seamen's Union, the Atlantic Coast Seamen's Union, and the Seamen's and Firemen's Union of the Gulf Coast. In 1893, the ISU affiliated with the American Federation of Labor, and took the name International Seamen's Union of America in 1895. In 1895, the Maguire Act was passed: desertion from coastal vessels no longer punishable by imprisonment. In 1897, the White Act was passed, which abolished "imprisonment of US citizens for desertion in American or nearby waters," and ended corporal punishment.

=== The early 20th century ===
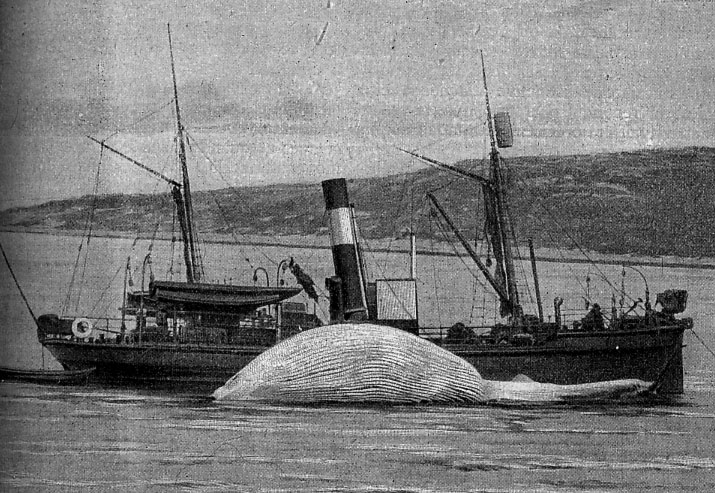
A steamship cleaning a whale, c. 1900.

In 1905, the Industrial Workers of the World (IWW, or "the Wobblies") was founded, representing mainly unskilled workers. "The Wobblies," a force in American labor only for about 15 years, were largely routed by the Palmer Raids after World War I. In 1908, Andrew Furuseth became president of the International Seamen's Union and served in that office until 1938.

==== The 1910s ====
During this period, Andrew Furuseth successfully pushed for legislative reforms that eventually became the Seamen's Act. During World War I there was a shipping boom and ISU's membership included more than 115,000 dues-paying members. However, when the boom ended, the ISU's membership shrunk to 50,000.

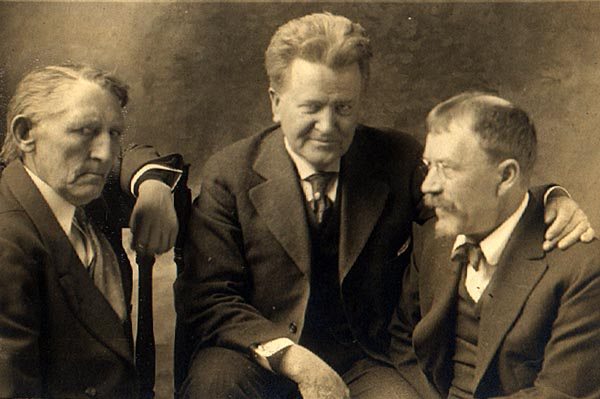
Andrew Furuseth (left) with Senator La Follette (center), and muckraker Lincoln Steffens, c. 1915

In 1915, the Seamen's Act of 1915 became law. The act fundamentally changed the life of the American sailor. Among other things, it:

1. abolished the practice of imprisonment for seamen who deserted their ship
2. reduced the penalties for disobedience
3. regulated a seaman's working hours both at sea and in port
4. established a minimum quality for ship's food
5. regulated the payment of seamen's wages
6. required specific levels of safety, particularly the provision of lifeboats
7. required a minimum percentage of the seamen aboard a vessel to be qualified Able Seamen
8. required a minimum of 75 percent of the seamen aboard a vessel to understand the language spoken by the officers

Laws like the Seaman's Act put U.S.-flagged vessels at an economic disadvantage against countries lacking such safeguards. By moving their ships to the Panamanian flag of convenience, owners could avoid providing these protections. The Belen Quezada, the first foreign ship flagged in the Panamanian registry, was employed in running illegal alcohol between Canada and the United States during Prohibition. In addition to sidestepping the Seamen's Act, Panamanian-flagged ships in this early period paid sailors on the Japanese wage scale, which was much lower than that of western merchant powers.

President Woodrow Wilson signed into law the act to create the United States Coast Guard on January 28, 1915. This Act effectively combined the Revenue Cutter Service with the Lifesaving Service and formed the new United States Coast Guard. Gradually the Coast Guard would grow to incorporate the United States Lighthouse Service in 1939 and the Navigation and Steamboat Inspection Service in 1942.

==== World War I ====
Shipbuilding became a major wartime industry, focused on merchant ships and tankers. Merchant ships were often sunk until the convoy system was adopted using British and Canadian naval escorts, Convoys were slow but were effective in stopping U-boat attacks. The troops were shipped over on fast passenger liners that could easily outrun submarines.

In the First World War, Britain, as an island nation, was heavily dependent on foreign trade and imported resources. Germany found that their submarines, or U-boats, while of limited effectiveness against surface warships on their guard, were greatly effective against merchant ships, and could easily patrol the Atlantic even when Allied ships dominated the surface.

By 1915, Germany was attempting to use submarines to maintain a naval blockade of Britain by sinking cargo ships, including many passenger vessels. Submarines, however, depending on stealth and incapable of withstanding a direct attack by a surface ship (possibly a Q-ship disguised as a merchant ship), found it difficult to give warning before attacking or to rescue survivors, which meant that civilian death tolls were high. This was a major factor in galvanizing neutral opinion against the Central Powers, as countries like the United States suffered casualties and loss to their trade, and was one of the causes of the eventual entry of the US into the war. In Sovereignty at Sea: U.S. Merchant Ships and American Entry into World War I, historian Dr. Rodney Carlisle asserts that it was, in fact, the sinking of nine U.S. merchant ships that ultimately induced President Wilson to ask Congress to declare war.

Over time, the use of defended convoys of merchant ships allowed the Allies to maintain shipping across the Atlantic, in spite of heavy loss. The Royal Navy had conducted convoys in the Napoleonic Wars and they had been used effectively to protect troopships in the current war, but the idea of using them to protect merchant shipping had been debated for several years. Nobody was sure if convoys were Britain's salvation or ruin. Consolidating merchant ships into convoys might just provide German U-boats with a target-rich environment, and packing ships together might lead to collisions and other accidents. It was potentially a logistical nightmare as well, and allied officers judged it too much so.

With the ability to replace losses, the dilemma of using convoys was not as painful. After experiments through the early months of 1917 that proved successful, the first formal convoys were organized in late May. By the autumn the convoy system had become very well organized, and losses for ships in convoy fell drastically, with 2% losses for ships in convoy compared to 10% losses for ships traveling on their own. The convoy loss rate dropped to 1% in October. However, convoy was not mandatory, and monthly loss rates did not fall below their 1916 levels until August 1918.

The need for administering the merchant marine during wartime was demonstrated during the First World War. Commerce warfare, carried on by submarines and merchant raiders, had a disastrous effect on the Allied merchant fleet. With the resumption of unrestricted submarine warfare in 1917, U-boats sank ships faster than replacements could be built.

==== 1919–1930 ====
Another of ISU's successes was the strike of 1919, which resulted in wages that were "an all-time high for deep sea sailors in peacetime." However, ISU had its shortcomings and failures, too. After a round of failed contract negotiations, ISU issued an all-ports strike on May 1, 1921. The strike lasted only two months and failed, with resulting wage cuts of 25 percent. The ISU, as with all AFL unions, was criticized as being too conservative. For example, in 1923 the Industrial Workers of the World publication The Marine Worker referred to the ISU's "pie-cards" (paid officials) as "grafters and pimps." In 1929, the California Maritime Academy established.

==== 1930–1941 ====
In 1933, John L. Lewis founded the Committee for Industrial Organizations within the AFL. The committee split from the AFL in 1938 as the Congress of Industrial Organizations (CIO). In 1934, Harry Lundeberg joined the Sailor's Union of the Pacific in Seattle. The ISU was weakened by the loss of the Sailors' Union of the Pacific in 1934. Furuseth charged that the SUP was being infiltrated by "radicals" from the IWW, and demanded the SUP cease activities with the Maritime Federation. The SUP refused and the ISU revoked their charter. The ISU was involved the West Coast longshoremen's strike of 1934. Lasting 83 days, the strike led to the unionization of all West Coast ports of the United States. The San Francisco general strike, along with the 1934 Toledo Auto-Lite Strike led by the American Workers Party and the Minneapolis Teamsters Strike of 1934, were important catalysts for the rise of industrial unionism in the 1930s.

West Coast sailors deserted ships in support of the International Longshoremen's Association longshoremen, leaving more than 50 ships idle in the San Francisco harbor. ISU officials reluctantly supported this strike. In clashes with the police between July 3 and July 5, 1934, three picketers were killed and "scores were injured." During negotiations to end the strike, the sailors received concessions including a three-watch system, pay increases, and better living conditions. In April 1935 at a conference of maritime unions in Seattle, an umbrella union was established to represent the membership of the ISU as well as maritime officers and longshoremen, which was named the Maritime Federation, Harry Lundeberg was named its first president. He was also named Secretary-Treasurer of SUP.

The merchant marine in the United States was in a state of decline in the mid-1930s. At that time few ships were being built, existing ships were old and inefficient, maritime unions were at war with one another, ship owners were at odds with the unions, and the crews’ efficiency and morale were at an ebb. Congress took action to fix the problems in 1936. The Merchant Marine Act, approved on June 29, 1936, created the U.S. Maritime Commission "to further the development and maintenance of an adequate and well balanced American merchant marine, to promote the commerce of the United States, and to aid in the national defense."

The commission realized that a trained merchant marine work force was vital to the national interest. At the request of Congress, the chairman of the Maritime Commission, VADM Emory S. Land worked with ADM Russell R. Waesche, Commandant of the Coast Guard, to formulate a training program for merchant-marine personnel. Called the U.S. Maritime Service, the new training program was inaugurated in 1938. It used a combination of civilian Maritime Commission and uniformed Coast Guard instructors to advance the professional training of merchant mariners.

Joseph P. Kennedy named head of Maritime Commission Merchant Marine Act in 1937. On 15 October 1938 the Seafarer's International Union was chartered.

===== NMU formation =====
In 1936, an ISU boatswain by the name of Joseph Curran was drawing attention. From March 1 to March 4, Curran led a strike aboard the SS California, then docked in San Pedro, California. Seamen along the East Coast struck to protect the treatment of the SS California's crew. Curran became a leader of the 10-week strike, eventually forming a supportive association known as the Seamen's Defense Committee. In October 1936, Curran called a second strike, in part to improve working conditions and in part to embarrass the ISU. The four-month strike idled 50,000 seamen and 300 ships along the Atlantic and Gulf coasts.

Believing it was time to abandon the conservative ISU, Curran began recruiting members for a new rival union. The level of organizing was so intense that hundreds of ships delayed sailing as seamen listened to organizers and signed union cards. The ISU's official publication, The Seamen's Journal, suggested Curran's "sudden disenchantment" with the ISU was odd, since he'd only been a "member of the union for one year during his seafaring career."

In May 1937, Curran and other leaders of his Seamen's Defense Committee reconstituted the group as the National Maritime Union. Holding its first convention in July, approximately 30,000 seamen switched their membership from the ISU to the NMU and Curran was elected president of the new organization. Within a year, the NMU had more than 50,000 members and most American shippers were under contract.

===== SIU formation =====
In August 1937, William Green, president of the American Federation of Labor, assumed control of the ISU with the goal of rebuilding it under the AFL. Lundeberg, who was also head of the Sailor's Union of the Pacific. On October 15, 1938, at an AFL convention in Houston, Texas, Green handed Lundeberg the Seafarer's International Union charter. The new union represented 7,000 members on the East and Gulf coasts. Seventy years later, SIU holds the charters to both NMU and SUP.

==== The 1940s ====
===== World War II =====
As with the other military services, the entry of the United States into the Second World War necessitated the immediate growth of the merchant marine and the Coast Guard. The Maritime Commission spawned the War Shipping Administration in early February 1942. This new agency received a number of functions considered vital to the war effort, including maritime training. Several weeks after the creation of the new agency, however, the Maritime Service was transferred again to the Coast Guard. The transfer allowed the War Shipping Administration to concentrate on organizing American merchant shipping, building new ships, and carrying cargoes where they were needed most.

The United States intended to meet this crisis with large numbers of mass-produced freighters and transports. When World War II loomed, the Maritime Commission began a crash shipbuilding program utilizing every available resource. The experienced shipyards built complicated vessels, such as warships. New shipyards, which opened almost overnight around the country, generally built less sophisticated ships such as the emergency construction "Liberty ships". By 1945 the shipyards had completed more than 2,700 "Liberty" ships and hundreds of "Victory ships", tankers and transports.

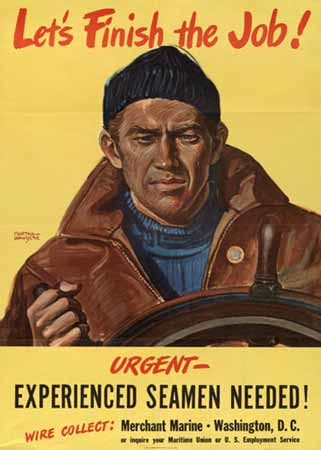
AB's were in high demand during World War II.

All of these new ships needed trained officers and crews to operate them. The Coast Guard provided much of the advanced training for merchant marine personnel to augment the training of state merchant marine academies. The Maritime Commission requested that the Coast Guard provide training in 1938 when the Maritime Service was created. Merchant sailors from around the country trained at two large training stations. On the East Coast the sailors trained at Fort Trumbull in New London, Connecticut, and Government Island in Alameda (renamed as Coast Guard Island), California served the West Coast. In 1940 Hoffman Island in New York Harbor became the third training station for the service. After the start of the war other training stations were added in Boston, Port Hueneme, California, and St. Petersburg, Florida.

Training ships crewed by the Coast Guard included the Maritime Commission steamships American Seaman, American Mariner, and American Sailor. One of these ships, the 7,000-gross-ton American Seaman, carried 250 trainees in addition to the regular crew of 18 officers and 100 enlisted sailors. Four complete machine shops, various lifeboats and up-to-date navigational equipment comprised the special educational equipment. In addition the Coast Guard crewed the full-rigged sail training ships Tusitala and Joseph Conrad, as well as the auxiliary schooner Vema. The 261-foot (80 m) Tusitala was built in Greenock, Scotland in 1883 and operated in merchant service before becoming a receiving ship in St. Petersburg in 1940. The 165-foot (50 m) Joseph Conrad sailed from Jacksonville, Florida to train apprentice seamen. The training ships were important commands. These steamships were the largest ships crewed by the service prior to the Coast Guard joining the Navy in World War II. CDR Alfred C. Richmond, who commanded the American Sailor, the first Maritime Service training ship, later became Commandant of the Coast Guard.

Licensed and unlicensed merchant marine personnel enrolled in the service. The ranks, grades, and ratings for the Maritime Service were based on those of the Coast Guard. Training for experienced personnel lasted three months; while inexperienced personnel trained for six months. Pay was based on the person's highest certified position in merchant service. New students received cadet wages. American citizens at least 19 years old, with one year of service on American merchant vessels of more than 500 gross tons, were eligible for enrollment. Coast Guard training of merchant mariners was vital to winning the war. Thousands of the sailors who crewed the new American merchant fleet trained under the watchful eyes of the Coast Guard.

The Coast Guard only continued the administration of the Maritime Service for ten months after the United States entered the war. Merchant marine training and most aspects of merchant marine activity transferred to the newly created War Shipping Administration on September 1, 1942. The transfer allowed the Coast Guard to take a more active role in the war and concentrated government administration of the merchant marine in one agency. However, just as the transfer removed the merchant marine training role from the Coast Guard, the service assumed the role of licensing seamen and inspecting merchant vessels.

The Atlantic Ocean was a major strategic battle zone during World War II (Battle of the Atlantic) and when Germany declared war on the US, the East Coast offered easy pickings for German U-boats (referred to as the Second happy time). After a highly successful foray by five Type IX long-range U-boats, the offensive was maximized by the use of short-range Type VII U-boats, with increased fuel stores, replenished from supply U-boats or "Milchkuh". In February to May 1942, 348 ships were sunk, for the loss of 2 U-boats during April and May. U.S. naval commanders were reluctant to introduce the convoy system that had protected trans-Atlantic shipping and, without coastal blackouts, shipping was silhouetted against the bright lights of American towns and cities.

Several ships were torpedoed within sight of East Coast cities such as New York and Boston; indeed, some civilians sat on beaches and watched battles between U.S. and German ships.

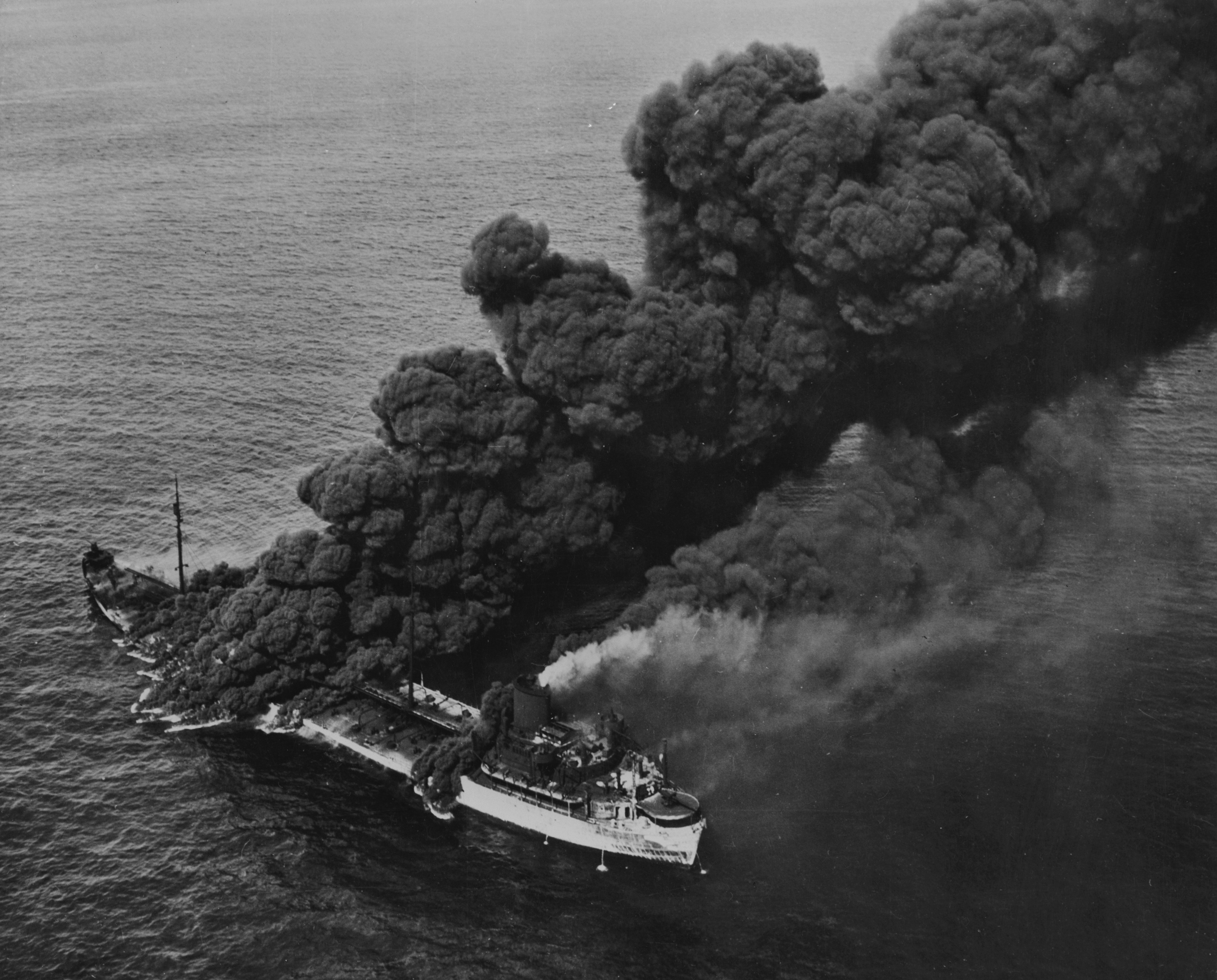
MS Pennsylvania Sun torpedoed in 1942 (was saved and returned to service in 1943).

Once convoys and air cover were introduced, sinking numbers were reduced and the U-boats shifted to attack shipping in the Gulf of Mexico, with 121 losses in June. In one instance, the tanker Virginia was torpedoed in the mouth of the Mississippi River by the German submarine U-507 on May 12, 1942, killing 26 crewmen. There were 14 survivors. Again, when defensive measures were introduced, ship sinkings decreased and U-boat sinkings increased.

The cumulative effect of this campaign was severe; a quarter of all wartime sinkings—3.1 million tons. There were several reasons for this. The naval commander, Admiral Ernest King, was averse to taking British recommendations to introduce convoys, U.S. Coast Guard and Navy patrols were predictable and could be avoided by U-boats, poor inter-service co-operation, and the U.S. Navy did not possess enough suitable escort vessels (British and Canadian warships were transferred to the U.S. east coast).

In 2017, Sadie O. Horton, who spent World War II working aboard a coastwise U.S. Merchant Marine barge, posthumously received official veteran's status for her wartime service, becoming the first recorded female Merchant Marine veteran of World War II.

===== Wartime issues =====
During the Second World War, the merchant service sailed and took orders from naval officers. Some were uniformed, and some were trained to use a gun. However, they were formally considered volunteers and not members of the military. Walter Winchell, the famous newspaper columnist and radio commentator, and columnist Westbrook Pegler both described the National Maritime Union and the merchant seamen generally as draft dodgers, criminals, riffraff, Communists, and other derogatory names.

It came to a head in the middle of the war with the writing of a column in the New York World-Telegram by Pegler, who alleged that merchant seamen refused to work on Sundays per union rules, causing sick USMC servicemen to unload their own supplies in an incident off Guadalcanal. He went on to say that these seamen received "fabulous pay for sailors, including overtime bonuses, whereas the navy men draw only the modest pay for their ratings without extras." This was a specific allegation, and in February 1943, the National Maritime Union, representing seven other unions, filed suit for libel against Hearst Newspapers, publisher of the newspaper, and the Associated Press for its wide dissemination of what was claimed to be an untrue story. As part of their suit, they pointed out that Government allotments for families, low-rate premiums on insurance, hospitalization, dental care, pension, and civil service rating consideration tend to balance the pay of ordinary seamen in civilian service. But they denied the incident ever took place, and were backed by a report of Admiral William F. Halsey, commander of United States forces in the South Pacific, to the Navy Department in which Halsey praised the "co-operation, efficiency and courage" of the merchant seamen and asserted that "In no instance have merchant marine seamen refused to discharge cargo from their vessels or in any other way failed to co-operate with the United States forces ashore in that (South Pacific) area." They won their suit, but the residual effect would last for decades.

What was ignored, say the Seafarers' International Union, was that seamen are paid by the ship owner for their work, consequently they were paid only while the ships were in the water. A seaman torpedoed off his ship was off the payroll the minute he was injured, landed in a lifeboat or hit the water. Surviving seamen had to beg, borrow, plead or work their way back to the United States from places such as Murmansk, Russia, so they could be reassigned to another ship. Until that happened, they weren't paid. And in addition they would be drafted if they didn't find another ship within 30 days. Their wartime record reveals that their losses were among the highest of any group in the front lines. They died at a rate of 1 in 24. All told, 733 American cargo ships were lost and 8,651 of the 215,000 who served perished on troubled waters and off enemy shores.

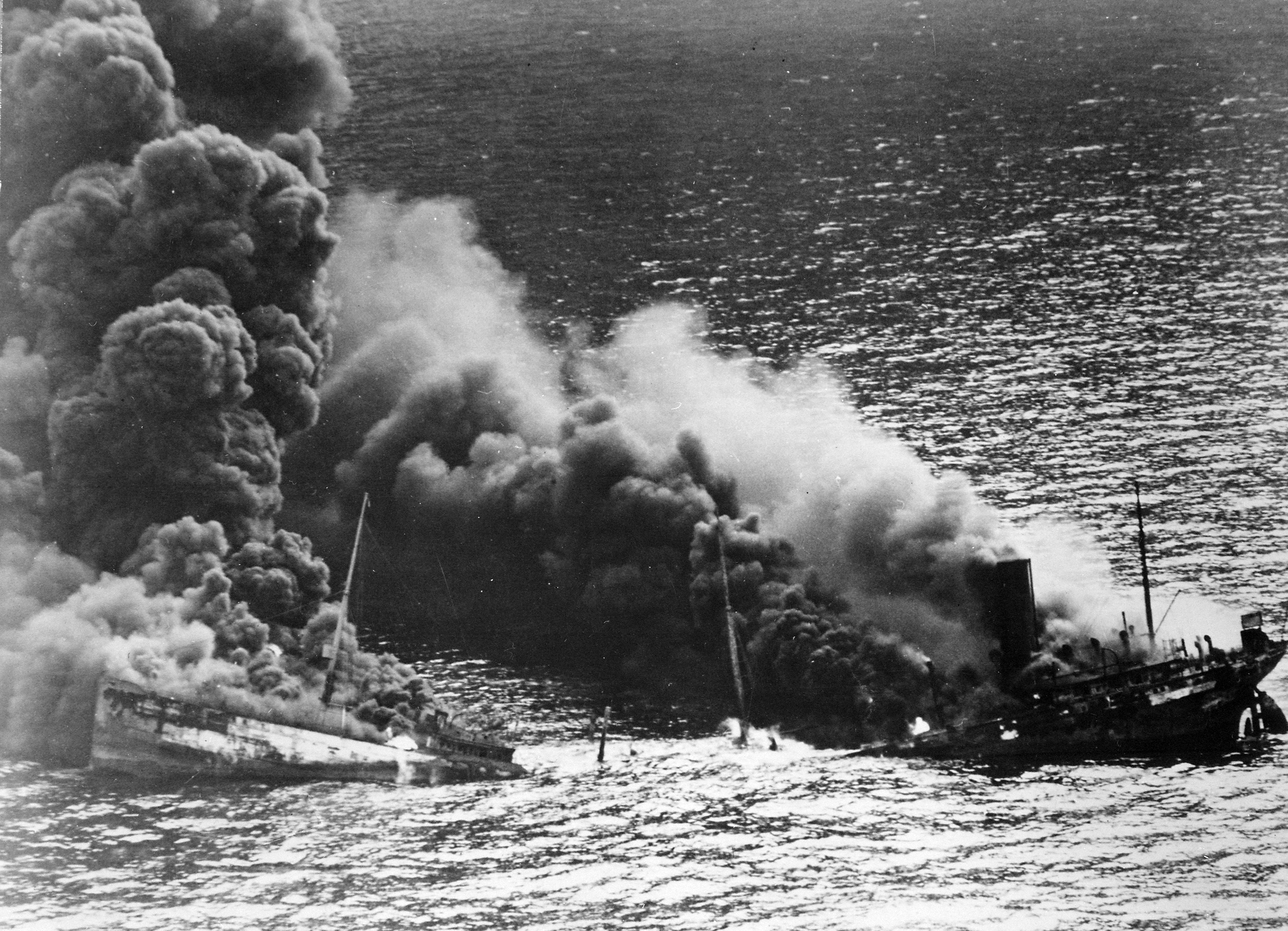
The Allied tanker Dixie Arrow after she was torpedoed in the Atlantic Ocean by U-71

The biggest supporter of the merchant sailors was President Franklin D. Roosevelt. It was he who in 1936 urged the United States Congress to pass the Merchant Marine Act, which established a 10-year program for building ships that would be used for commerce during peacetime and would be converted for use by the Navy during times of war or national emergency; and a training program for seamen that linked them to the military in wartime, specifically the Navy. It was this legislation that enabled the country to take on the Axis powers a few years later, but not before extensive losses on the East coast, which was crawling with German submarines by the end of 1941. That year the Germans sank 1,232 Allied and neutral ships worldwide, including those crewed by the Merchant Marine, and the following year was even worse. The Allies would lose 1,323 ships, while Germany's submarine losses totaled just 87. More than 1,000 merchant seamen would die within sight of the East Coast, and it wasn't uncommon for inhabitants of the seashore to find their bodies washed up on the sand.

Roosevelt, while the war was under way, proclaimed "Mariners have written one of its most brilliant chapters. They have delivered the goods when and where needed in every theater of operations and across every ocean in the biggest, the most difficult and dangerous job ever undertaken. As time goes on, there will be greater public understanding of our merchant's fleet record during this war."

But it wasn't to be, for with Roosevelt's death in 1945, the Merchant Marine lost its staunchest supporter and any chance to share in the accolades afforded others who served. The War Department, the same government branch that recruited them, opposed the Seaman's Bill of Rights in 1947 (see below) and managed to kill the legislation in congressional committee, effectively ending any chance for seamen to reap the thanks of a nation. For 43 years, the U.S. government denied them benefits ranging from housing to health care until Congress awarded them veterans' status in 1988, too late for 125,000 mariners, roughly half of those who had served.

Today there are shrine and memorial reminders of mariners' heroism such as The American Merchant Marine Veterans Memorial in San Pedro, California, and the American Merchant Mariners' Memorial at Battery Park in Lower Manhattan. The old Navy-Marine Memorial in Washington, D.C. honors those who died during World War I.

Since the First World War and World War II, many Merchant Marine officers have also held commissions in the United States Naval Reserve. Graduates of the U.S. Merchant Marine Academy are commissioned into the USNR by default if they do not choose to be commissioned in another service of the armed forces. A special badge, known as the Naval Reserve Merchant Marine Badge, has existed since the early 1940s to recognize such Merchant Marine personnel who are called to active duty in the Navy. World War II USMM were eligible for the Merchant Marine Distinguished Service Medal, Merchant Marine Mariner's Medal, Merchant Marine Combat Bar, Merchant Marine Atlantic War Zone Bar, Merchant Marine Mediterranean-Middle East War Zone Bar, and Merchant Marine Pacific War Zone Bar. In 1946, a Merchant Marine World War II Victory Medal was established.

In the late 1940s, the Liberian open registry was formed as the brainchild of Edward Stettinius, who had been Franklin D. Roosevelt's Secretary of State during World War II. Stettinius created a corporate structure that included The Liberia Corporation, a joint-venture with the government of Liberia. The corporation was structured so that one-fourth of its revenue would go to the Liberian government, another 10% went to fund social programs in Liberia, and the remainder returned to Stettinius' corporation. The Liberian registry was created at a time when the Panama's registry was becoming less attractive for several reasons including its unpopularity with the U.S. labor movement and European shipping concerns, political unrest in Panama, and increases in its fees and regulations.

On 11 March 1949, Greek shipping magnate Stavros Niarchos registered the first ship under the Liberian flag of convenience, the World Peace. When Stettinius died in 1950, ownership of the registry passed to the International Bank of Washington, led by General George Olmsted. Within 18 years, Liberia grew to surpass the United Kingdom as the world's largest register.

==== The 1950s ====
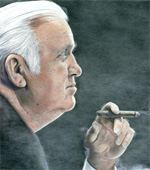
Paul Hall ordered the creation of AMO.

The U.S. Maritime Commission was abolished on 24 May 1950, its functions were split between the U.S. Federal Maritime Board which was responsible for regulating shipping and awarding subsidies for construction and operation of merchant vessels, and Maritime Administration, which was responsible for administering subsidy programs, maintaining the national defense reserve merchant fleet, and operating the U.S. Merchant Marine Academy. AMO was chartered on May 12, 1949, as the Brotherhood of Marine Engineers by Paul Hall as an affiliate of the Seafarer's International Union of North America. The original membership consisted entirely of civilian seafaring veterans of World War II.

===== Korean War =====
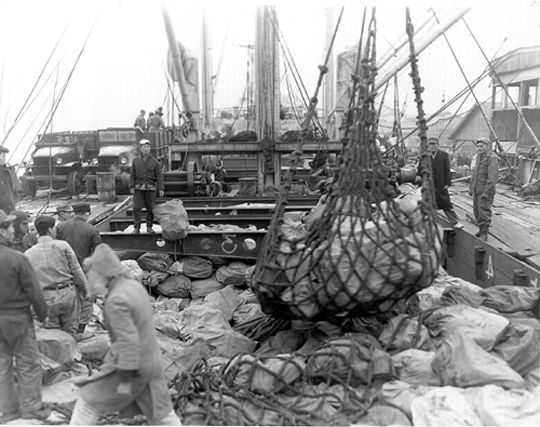
Merchant ship carrying mail from the United States to combat troops in war zone, ties up at a port in Korea. During Korean War.

On March 13, 1951, the Secretary of Commerce established the National Shipping Authority (NSA) to provide ships from the Maritime Administration's (MARAD) National Defense Fleet (NDRF). These ships would meet the needs of the military services and other agencies of government beyond the capabilities of the privately owned vessels of the U.S.-flag Merchant Marine. During times of war, the NSA also requisitioned privately owned merchant ships and made them available for military purposes. Immediately after its establishment, the NSA reactivated vessels to meet the urgent needs of America's European allies to help transport coal and other bulk materials to rebuild their defenses.

During the Korean War there were few severe sealift problems other than the need to re-mobilize forces following post–World War II demobilization. About 700 ships were activated from the NDRF for services to the Far East. In addition, a worldwide tonnage shortfall between 1951 and 1953 required the reactivation of over 600 ships to lift coal to Northern Europe and grain to India during the first years of the Cold War. The commercial merchant marine formed the backbone of the bridge of ships across the Pacific. From just six ships under charter when the war began, this total peaked at 255. According to the Military Sea Transportation Service (MSTS), 85 percent of the dry cargo requirements during the Korean War were met through commercial vessels – only five percent were shipped by air. More than $475 million, or 75 percent of the MSTS operating budget for calendar year 1952, was paid directly to commercial shipping interests. In addition to the ships assigned directly to MSTS, 130 laid-up Victory ships in the NDRF were broken out by the Maritime Administration and assigned under time-charters to private shipping firms for charter to MSTS.

Ships of the MSTS not only provided supplies but also served as naval auxiliaries. When the U.S. Army's X Corps went ashore at Inchon in September 1950, 13 USNS cargo ships, 26 chartered American, and 34 Japanese-crewed merchant ships, under the operational control of MSTS, participated in the invasion. Sealift responsibilities were accomplished on short notice during the Korean War. Initially American troops lacked the vital equipment to fight the North Koreans, but military and commercial vessels quickly began delivering the fighting tools needed to turn back the enemy. According to the MSTS, 7 tons of supplies were needed for every Marine or soldier bound for Korea and an additional one for each month thereafter. Cargo ships unloaded supplies around the clock, making Pusan a bustling port. The success of the U.S. Merchant Marine during this crisis hammered home to critics the importance of maritime preparedness and the folly of efforts to scuttle the Merchant Marine fleet. In addition to delivering equipment to American forces – more than 90 percent of all American and other United Nations’ troops – supplies and equipment were delivered to Korea through the MSTS with the assistance of commercial cargo vessels. A bridge of ships, much like in World War II, spanned the Pacific Ocean during the three years of hostilities.

Merchant ships played an important role in the evacuation of United Nations troops from Hungnam, following the Chosin Reservoir Campaign. The Merchant Marine and Navy evacuated over 100,000 U.N. troops and another 91,000 Korean refugees and moved 350,000 tons of cargo and 17,500 vehicles in less than two weeks. One of the most famous rescues was performed by the U.S. merchant ship SS Meredith Victory. Only hours before the advancing communists drove the U.N. forces from North Korea in December 1950, the vessel, built to accommodate 12 passengers, carried more than 14,000 Korean civilians from Hungnam to Pusan in the south. First mate D. S. Savastio, with nothing but first aid training, delivered five babies during the three-day passage to Pusan. Ten years later, the Maritime Administration honored the crew by awarding them a Gallant Ship Award.

Privately owned American merchant ships helped deploy thousands of U.S. troops and their equipment, bringing high praise from the commander of U.S. Naval Forces in the Far East, Admiral Charles T. Joy. In congratulating Navy Captain A.F. Junker, Commander of the Military Sea Transportation Service for the western Pacific, Admiral Joy noted that the success of the Korean campaign was dependent on the Merchant Marine. He said, "The Merchant Mariners in your command performed silently, but their accomplishments speak loudly. Such teammates are comforting to work with."

Government owned merchant vessels from the National Defense Reserve Fleet (NDRF) have supported emergency shipping requirements in seven wars and crises. During the Korean War, 540 vessels were activated to support military forces. From 1955 through 1964, another 600 ships were used to store grain for the Department of Agriculture. Another tonnage shortfall following the Suez Canal closing in 1956 caused 223 cargo ship and 29 tanker activations from the NDRF.

===== 1953–1960 =====
In 1953 at the Sixth Biennial Convention of the SIUNA the BME gained autonomy, which would allow it to adopt its first constitution and elect officers for the first time. The first constitution was drafted by Edward Reisman, Rudolph Wunsch, James Wilde, Everett Landers, Peter Geipi, and William Lovvorn, who "wanted to craft a document that would provide for free and fair elections, set the terms of office for official positions, specify the duties of union officials, provide for charges, trials, and appeals, permit rank and file membership inspection of the union's financial records, and permit amendments by rank and file vote." The constitution, allowing for the election of a president, two vice-presidents, and a secretary-treasurer, was adopted with 96 percent of the membership voting to adopt it. Wilbur Dickey was elected first president on December 15, 1953. In September 1954, the American Federation of Labor (AFL) recognized the fledgling union, by granting it "exclusive jurisdiction within the federation over 'licensed engine room personnel on self-propelled vessels.'"

The BME Welfare Plan was growing at an impressive rate under the care of Director of Welfare and Special Services Ray McKay. In August 1954, he reported its assets to be in excess of $100,000. The plan offered a number of progressive benefits, such as full surgery coverage for members and their families, and full coverage for seeing a physician. In February 1955, the union began pursuing the "first pension plan ever for U.S. merchant marine officers," which was well underway by November 1955.

In 1955, Joseph Curran was named a vice-president of the AFL–CIO. Due to pressures from the Second Red Scare after World War II the AFL and CIO merged into the AFL–CIO in 1955 under the leadership of John L. Lewis. In 1957, Wilbur Dickey resigned the union's presidency and Ray McKay took the position on January 17, 1957. Later that year, on October 29, 1957, McKay and then-president of the Marine Engineers Beneficial Association H.L. Daggett signed an accord leading BME to merge with several MEBA locals. The newly formed entity was known as MEBA's Great Lakes District Local 101. On 28 January 1957, Harry Lundeberg died. Shortly after, Paul Hall became president of Seafarer's International Union. That year, Raymond McKay became president of American Maritime Officers, which left SIU, and joined MEBA. Also that year, Michael Sacco joined Seafarer's International Union.

=== The late 20th century ===
==== 1960s ====
In 1960, after an internal reorganization of MEBA, American Maritime Officers became known as "District 2 MEBA." In 1961, the Federal Maritime Board regulatory functions were assumed by the newly created Federal Maritime Commission, while the subsidy functions were assigned to the Maritime Subsidy Board of the Maritime Administration. During the Berlin crisis of 1961, 18 National Defense Reserve Fleet vessels were activated, which remained in service until 1970. The Vietnam War required the activation of 172 NDRF vessels.

==== Vietnam War ====
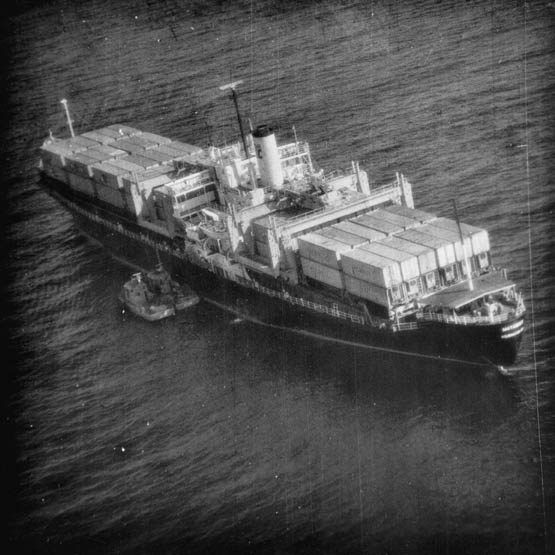
Aerial photograph during the boarding SS Mayagüez, note Cambodian gunboats alongside the ship.

During the Vietnam War, ships crewed by civilian seamen carried 95 percent of the supplies used by our Armed Forces. Many of these ships sailed into combat zones under fire. In fact, the SS Mayaguez incident involved the capture of mariners from the American merchant ship SS Mayaguez. The crisis began on May 12, 1975, when Khmer Rouge naval forces operating former U.S. Navy "Swift Boats" seized the American container ship SS Mayagüez in recognized international sea lanes claimed as territorial waters by Cambodia and removed its crew for questioning. Surveillance by P-3 Orion aircraft indicated that the ship was then moved to and anchored at Koh Tang, an island approximately 50 miles (80 km) off the southern coast of Cambodia near that country's shared border with Vietnam. Tragically, the ship's crew whose seizure had prompted the US attack had been released in good health, unknown to the US Marines or the US command of the operation, before the Marines attacked. The incident marked the last official battle of the United States involvement in the Vietnam War.

==== The 1970s ====
In 1970, the Merchant Marine Act authorized a subsidized shipbuilding program. On March 5, 1973 Joseph Curran resigned as the president of NMU, he was succeeded by Shannon J. Wall. In 1976, the first woman was admitted to the U.S. Merchant Marine Academy. Since 1977, the Ready Reserve Fleet has taken over the brunt of the work previously handled by the National Defense Reserve Fleet. The RRF made a major contribution to the success of Operation Desert Shield/Operation Desert Storm from August 1990 through June 1992, when 79 vessels were activated to meet military sealift requirements by carrying 25% of the unit equipment and 45% of the ammunition needed.

==== The 1980s ====
In 1981, the Maritime Administration came under control of the U.S. Department of Transportation. In 1988, Frank Drozak died, Michael Sacco replaced him as president of Seafarer's International Union.

==== The 1990s ====
In 1992, while functioning as an autonomous union within MEBA, "District 2" reverted to its original name of "American Maritime Officers." In 1993, Raymond T. McKay died, his son Michael McKay replaced him as American Maritime Officers president. AMO finally withdrew from MEBA in 1994 and resultingly lost its AFL-CIO affiliation This was restored after approximately a decade, on March 12, 2004, when Michael Sacco presented AMO with a charter from SIUNA.

Two RRF tankers, two RO/RO ships and a troop transport ship were needed in Somalia for Operation Restore Hope in 1993 and 1994. During the Haitian crisis in 1994, 15 ships were activated for Operation Uphold Democracy operations. In 1995 and 1996, four RO/RO ships were used to deliver military cargo as part of U.S. and U.K. support to NATO peace-keeping missions. Four RRF ships were activated to provide humanitarian assistance for Central America following Hurricane Mitch in 1998. Three RRF ships currently support the Afloat Prepositioning Force with two specialized tankers and one dry cargo vessel capable of underway replenishment for the Navy's Combat Logistics Force.

=== The 2000s ===
On October 22, 2001, the Merchant Marine Act of 2001 was enacted, providing for the construction of 300 ships in a span of ten years. In 2003, 40 RRF ships were used in support of Operation Enduring Freedom and Operation Iraqi Freedom. This RRF contribution was significant and included sealifting equipment and supplies into the theatre of combat operations, which included combat support equipment for the Army, Navy Combat Logistics Force, and USMC Aviation Support equipment. By the beginning of May 2005, RRF cumulative support included 85 ship activations that logged almost 12,000 ship operating days, moving almost 25% of the equipment needed to support the U.S. Armed Forces liberation of Iraq. MSC is also involved in the current Iraq War, having delivered 61 million square feet (5.7 km^{2}) of cargo and 1.1 billion US gallons (4,200,000 m^{3}) of fuel by the end of the first year alone. Merchant mariners are being recognized for their contributions in Iraq. For example, in late 2003, Vice Adm. David Brewer III, commander of Military Sealift Command, awarded the officers and crewmembers of MV Capt. Steven L. Bennett the Merchant Marine Expeditionary Medal.

On January 8, 2007, Tom Bethel was appointed by the AMO national executive committee to fulfil the term of former president Michael McKay. The RRF was called upon to provide humanitarian assistance to gulf coast areas following Hurricane Katrina and Hurricane Rita landfalls in August and September, respectively, of 2005. The Federal Emergency Management Agency requested a total of eight vessels to support relief efforts. Messing and berthing was provided for refinery workers, oils spill response teams, longshoremen. One of the vessels provided electrical power.

In 2020, Congress passed the Merchant Mariners of World War II Congressional Gold Medal Act to recognize the merchant mariners for their courage and contributions during the war. During World War II, nearly 250,000 civilian merchant mariners served as part of the U.S. military and delivered supplies and armed forces personnel by ship to foreign countries engulfed in the war. Between 1939 and 1945, 9,521 merchant mariners died – a higher proportion than those killed than in any military branch, according to the National WWII Museum.

"President Franklin D. Roosevelt called their mission the most difficult and dangerous transportation job ever undertaken," House Speaker Nancy Pelosi said at the ceremony, which was held at the U.S. Capitol and attended by congressional and military leaders.

The Congressional Gold Medal will be displayed at the American Merchant Marine Museum in Kings Point, New York. In addition, each of the surviving merchant mariners – now estimated to number about 12,000 from the World War II years – will receive a bronze replica of the coveted award.

Two of the World War II mariners – Charles Mills, 101, of Baltimore, Maryland, and Dave Yoho, 94, of Vienna, Virginia – attended the ceremony at the U.S. Capitol.

== See also ==
- Awards and decorations of the United States Merchant Marine
- Maritime history
- Jones Act
- Liberty ship
- Navy Reserve Merchant Marine Badge
- Sailortown (dockland)
- Slave ship and History of slavery in the United States
- United States Maritime Service
- United States Merchant Marine
- United States Merchant Marine Academy
