= Dingley Act (shipping) =

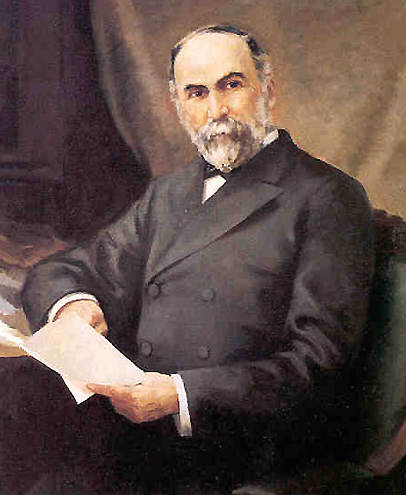
The act was introduced by Nelson Dingley, Jr.

The Dingley Act of 1884 was a United States law introduced by U.S. Representative Nelson Dingley, Jr. of Maine dealing with American mariners serving in the United States Merchant Marine.

Among other things, the act:

- prohibited advances on wages, and
- limited the making of seamen's allotments (payment of part of a seaman's wages to another party) to only close relatives.

In 1886, a loophole to the Dingley Act was created, allowing boardinghouse keepers to receive seamen's allotments.

The legislation replaced the Shipping Commissioners Act of 1872.

== See also ==
- Shanghaiing
- Maritime history of the United States
