= Michael McKay (labor leader) =

American trade union leader and convicted racketeer

- Occupation: Former trade union leader
- Spouse: Carol

Michael McKay is a convicted racketeer and former labor leader from the United States. He was president of American Maritime Officers (AMO) from 1993 until his conviction in 2007.

McKay, son of long-time AMO president Raymond McKay, joined the union as a Third Assistant Engineer in 1968. He worked his way up to chief engineer (steam and diesel), sailing aboard deep-sea tankers and containerships.

Subsequently, he served as a union representative, organizer and as a member of the AMO executive board. McKay served as the union's secretary-treasurer until his father's death in 1993, when he took over the presidency. He was elected by wide margins in 1993 and 1996.

In 2000, executive director of the AMO's benefit plans David Merriken (who had been the best man at McKay's wedding) told federal prosecutors that he had been involved in criminal activities at the union. During the six-year investigation, he recorded over 200 tapes of discussions with other union leaders.

On September 14, 2005, officials from the Department of Justice and Department of Labor announced the unsealing of a 13-count indictment against McKay, his brother Robert, and two other AMO officials.

Count 1 of the Indictment charged Michael McKay, Robert McKay, the National Secretary-Treasurer of the AMO Union, and former AMO employees Phillip Ciccarelli and James Lynch with conspiring to participate in the affairs of a racketeering enterprise by committing multiple acts involving theft and embezzlement from the AMO Union and the AMO Benefit Plans, graft, obstruction of justice, witness tampering, mail fraud, and honest services fraud.

Michael McKay was also charged with embezzlement from the AMO Benefit Plans (Count 2), mail fraud (Counts 4, 9, and 10), falsification of records pertaining to the AMO Benefit Plans (Count 11), and failure to maintain records required by the Labor Management and Reporting Disclosure Act (Count 12).

Robert McKay was further charged with mail fraud (Counts 4 and 9), embezzlement from the AMO Union (Count 8), failure to maintain records required by the LMRDA (Count 12), and falsification of records required by the LMRDA (Count 13).

Phillip Ciccarelli was further charged with witness tampering (Count 3), mail fraud (Count 5), and graft affecting the AMO Benefit Plans (Counts 6 and 7).

McKay went to trial in Broward County, Florida on November 21, 2006. During the trial, prosecutors made the case that the McKay brothers had used the union as a "personal piggy bank," using benefit funds to repair their dive boat, throw Michael's son a bachelor party, to pay for items such as "fine china, cigars, hockey games," and to make illegal campaign contributions.

The trial lasted four weeks, and the jurors took just one day to find the McKay brothers guilty on most of the charges. McKay was convicted on the following charges: racketeering conspiracy, three counts of mail fraud, and two recordkeeping offenses.

He was found not guilty on the charge of embezzling from an employee benefit plan.

McKay resigned the AMO presidency shortly after his conviction and Tom Bethel was appointed to replace him. Bethel had formerly served as AMO's national executive vice president.

McKay's brother, former AMO National Secretary-Treasurer Robert McKay was convicted of two counts of mail fraud, embezzlement, and two recordkeeping offenses. The father served as AMO president for 36 years.

The McKay brothers remained free on bond until their sentencing on March 29, 2007. At that time, McKay was sentenced to 6 1/2 years of prison, ordered to forfeit more than $2,000,000 to the U.S. government and pay AMO $275,000. Robert McKay was sentenced to 15 months, must forfeit $510,000 to the government, and $260,000 to AMO.

McKay and his wife, Carol, have five children and seven grandchildren. They were married in 1970.

== Trivia ==
- McKay held union book #M-130.
- The sentence for racketeering conspiracy could have been for up to 20 years.

== See also ==
- American Maritime Officers
- Raymond McKay
- Michael Sacco
- Harry Lundeberg
- Paul Hall (labor leader)
- Seafarers International Union
