= James Kelly (crimper) =

American crimp

- Occupations: Bar owner and crimper
- Title: Shanghai Kelly

James Kelly, better known as "Shanghai" Kelly, was an American crimp of the 19th century who kidnapped men and forced them to work on ships. The terms "crimping" and "shanghaiing" are used to describe this type of work. A legendary figure in San Francisco history, Kelly was known for supplying or shanghaiing men to understaffed ships.

Kelly kept a boarding house in San Francisco, variously reported to be on Pacific or Broadway. He also ran a number of bars including the Boston House, at the corner of Davis and Chambers streets near the waterfront. He also ran a saloon and boarding house at No. 33 Pacific between Drumm and Davis streets. These businesses provided Kelly with a steady supply of victims.

In the early 1870s, Kelly was reported to have shanghaied 100 men for three understaffed ships in a single evening. Renting the paddle steamer Goliath, he announced that he was hosting a free booze cruise to celebrate his "birthday", and to say "thank you" to his fellow crimps and runners who had helped him through the years. After leaving port, his bartenders served opium-laced whiskey to his guests, who were then offloaded to the waiting ships. His greatest concern – returning from a well-publicized event with a boat devoid of revelers – was alleviated by a stroke of luck, when he learned that the Yankee Blade had struck a rock and was sinking. After rescuing everyone on board, he simply resumed the celebration, and those on the waterfront were none the wiser upon his return.

Actor Robert Taylor played Kelly in the 1967 episode "Shanghai Kelly's Birthday Party" of the syndicated television series Death Valley Days, which Taylor also hosted.

The Irish music band Gaelic Storm released a song about Kelly, entitled "Shanghai Kelly", on the 2017 album Go Climb a Tree.

== See also ==
- Joseph "Bunko" Kelly – the "King of the Crimps"

== Sources ==
- Samuel Dickson, "Shanghai Kelly", Tales of San Francisco Stanford: University Press, 1957.
- Bill Pickelhaupt, "Shanghaied in San Francisco," San Francisco: Flyblister Press, 1996. ISBN 0-9647312-2-3
- "Mission to Seafarers Timeline Alongside World Events". Mission to Seafarers. Archived from the original on September 16, 2007.
- "The Lookout of the Labor Movement" (PDF). Sailors Union of the Pacific. Archived from the original (PDF) on January 1, 2007.
- "Archives: Balclutha". Sailors Union of the Pacific. Archived from the original on April 11, 2001.
- Smith, Georgia (1988). "About That Blood in the Scuppers". Reclaiming San Francisco: History Politics and Culture, a City Lights Anthology. City Lights. Archived from the original on October 11, 2006.
