= Tom Bethel =

American labor leader

Thomas J. Bethel is an American labor leader. He was elected national president of American Maritime Officers in 2008. He was reelected as AMO National President in 2010. He had been appointed as the national president of the American Maritime Officers union (AMO) on January 8, 2007 by the union's National Executive Committee. Bethel formerly served as AMO's national executive vice-president, which is the third highest position in the union.

Bethel sailed with AMO as a Chief Engineer for several years before being named a union representative in 1986. He later served as an executive board member and as the national assistant vice president at large.

== See also ==
- Michael McKay
- Michael Sacco
- American Maritime Officers
- Seafarers International Union
