= Joseph Kelly (crimper) =

Kidnapper who Shanghaied sailors

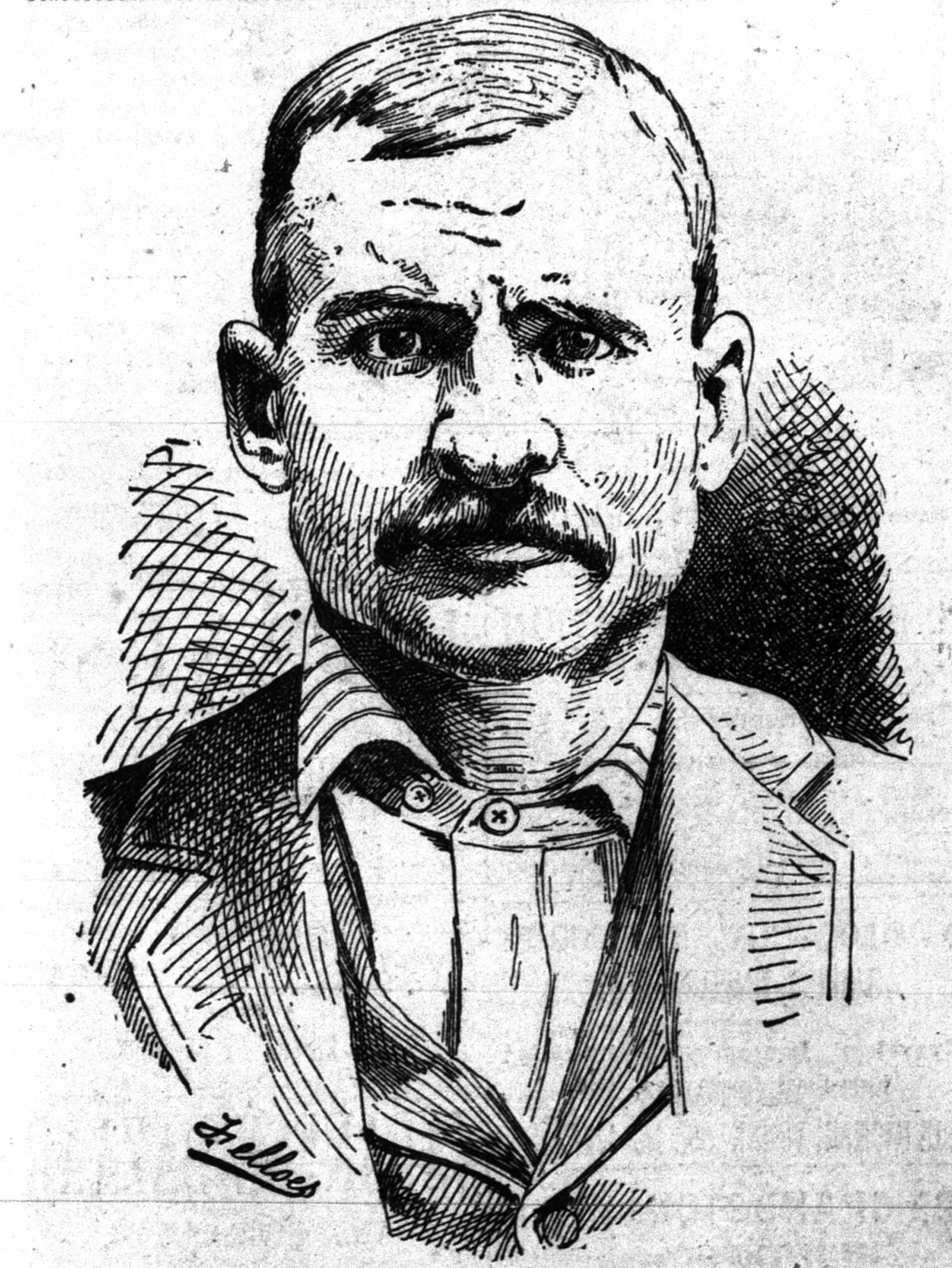
- Contemporary drawing of Joseph Kelly in 1894
- Born: Liverpool, England
- Disappeared: c. 1908; Salem, Oregon, U.S.
- Died: unknown: after 1908
- Other name: Bunko Kelly
- Occupations: Hotelier and crimper

Joseph "Bunko" Kelly was an English hotelier of the 19th century who kidnapped men and sold them to work on ships. The terms "Shanghaiing" and "crimping" are used to describe this type of activity. By his own account, he Shanghaied about 2,000 men and women during his 15-year career, beginning in 1879.

== History ==
Kelly, later called "The King of the Crimps", received his "Bunko" nickname in 1885 (Note: Spider Johnson says October 1891) by providing a crewman that turned out to be a cigar store Indian. Kelly made $50 on the deal.

In one infamous deal in 1893, he delivered 22 (Note: Some sources say 20, other say 24.) men who had mistakenly consumed embalming fluid from the open cellar of a mortuary. He sold all the men, most of whom were dead, to a captain who sailed before the truth was discovered. He got $52 for each man.

Once, he set a record for crimping, by rounding up 50 men in 3 hours.

Kelly was never arrested for crimping because it was not illegal at the time. He was however arrested for murder in 1894. He was convicted in March 1895, and sent to the Oregon State Penitentiary in Salem, Oregon. He was released in 1908. Afterwards, he wrote a book entitled Thirteen Years In The Oregon Penitentiary, about the conditions there. He was identified as an inmate of the Oregon State Penitentiary in the 1900 Federal Census. His entry in the census record indicates he was born in Connecticut, not the United Kingdom.

After his book was published, he left on a trip to California and never returned.

== See also ==
- James "Shanghai" Kelly
- List of people who disappeared mysteriously (pre-1910)
