= American Maritime Officers =

AMO
- American Maritime Officers
- Founded: May 12, 1949
- Headquarters: Dania Beach, Florida
- Location: United States
- Members: 3,082 (2014)
- Key people: Paul Doell
- Affiliations: AFL-CIO
- Website: www.amo-union.org

American Maritime Officers (AMO) is a national labor union affiliated with the Seafarers International Union of North America. With an active membership of approximately 4,000, AMO represents licensed mariners working in the United States Merchant Marine aboard U.S.-flagged merchant and military sealift vessels. AMO holds a unique presence in the international energy transportation trades.

AMO officers work in a broad range of domestic and international trades aboard U.S.-flagged vessels in the deep-sea sector, including oil and product tankers, containerships, roll-on/roll-off ships, heavy-lift ships, trailer ships, general cargo vessels, and the only U.S.-owned fleet of undersea cable installation and repair ships.

AMO officers work in the Military Sealift Command fleet of large medium-speed roll-on/roll-off vessels (LMSRs) and aboard military prepositioning vessels, fast sealift ships, product tankers, Ready Reserve Force ships, and several others operated by private-sector ship managers for MSC and the Maritime Administration.

AMO has pioneered new job opportunities for American officers in the international fleet. AMO officers work aboard international liquefied natural gas (LNG) carriers operating worldwide.

At the Simulation, Training, Assessment & Research (STAR) Center, operated by the AMO Safety & Education Plan, AMO officers, have access to the only LNG training program in the U.S. certified to the standards of the Society of International Gas Tanker and Terminal Operators (SIGTTO). With developed international equivalencies, AMO officers can crew vessels registered with more than a dozen flag states.

At STAR Center, AMO officers also have access to a comprehensive dynamic positioning (DP) training program accredited by the Nautical Institute.

AMO represents the officers and stewards in the majority of the U.S. Great Lakes fleets. AMO also has collective bargaining agreements covering ocean-going, harbor tugs, and inland towboats.

AMO members and their families draw employer-paid benefits from the AMO Medical, Vacation, Pension, and Defined Contribution Plans, the Pension Plan Money Purchase Benefit, and from individual accounts through the AMO 401(k) Plan.

The AMO Safety & Education Plan provides AMO members and applicants with comprehensive maritime training, license upgrading, and STCW certification programs at the STAR Center in Dania Beach, Florida. These training programs, including lodging and meals, are available to AMO officers at no cost at STAR Center. The former STAR center in Toledo, Ohio was closed in 2008, and training for AMO officers has been consolidated at the site in Florida.

== History ==
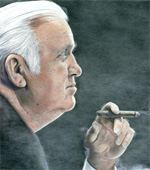
Paul Hall ordered the creation of AMO.

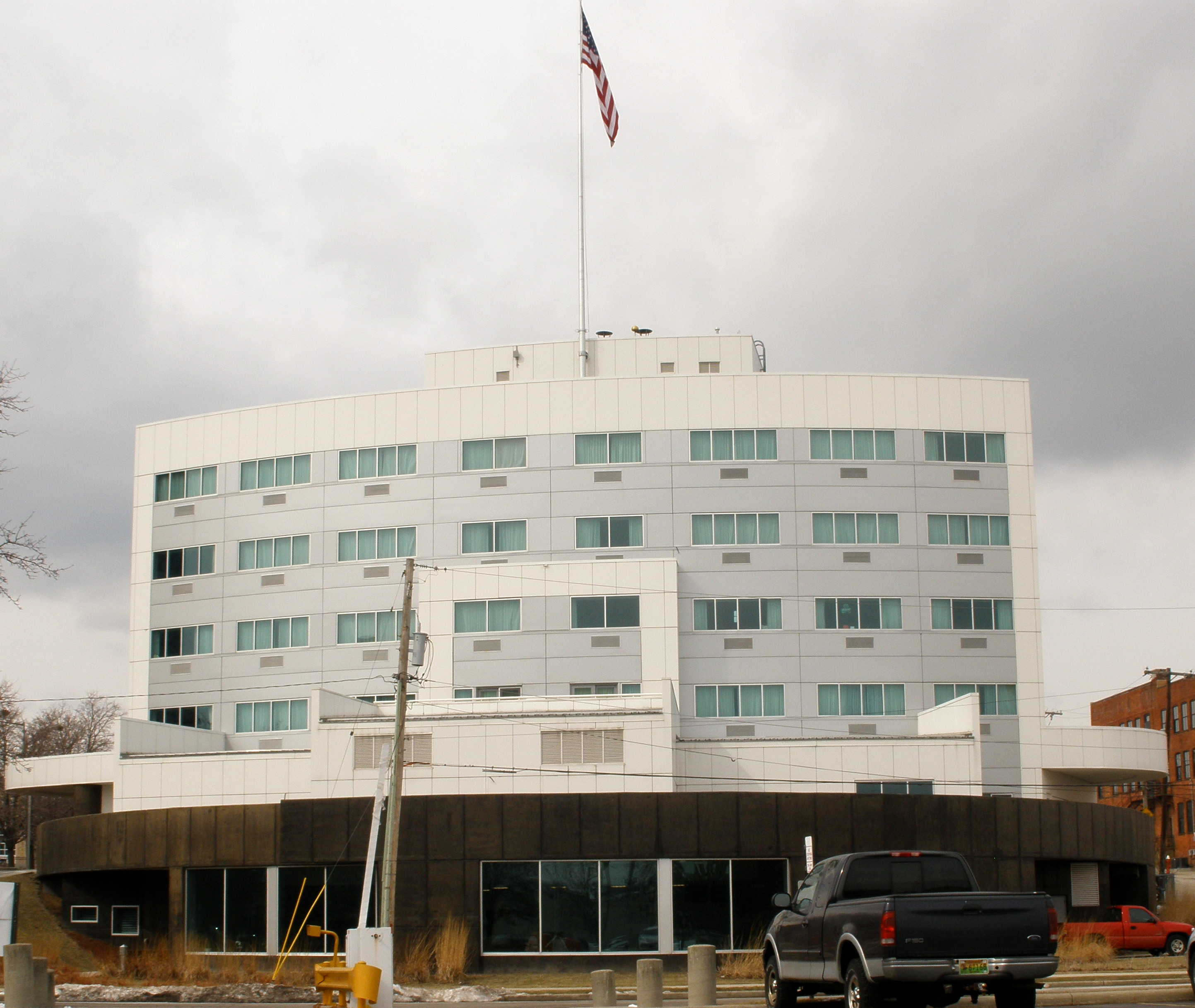
The AMO Safety & Education Plan operates the STAR Center, which provides licensing and professional development courses.

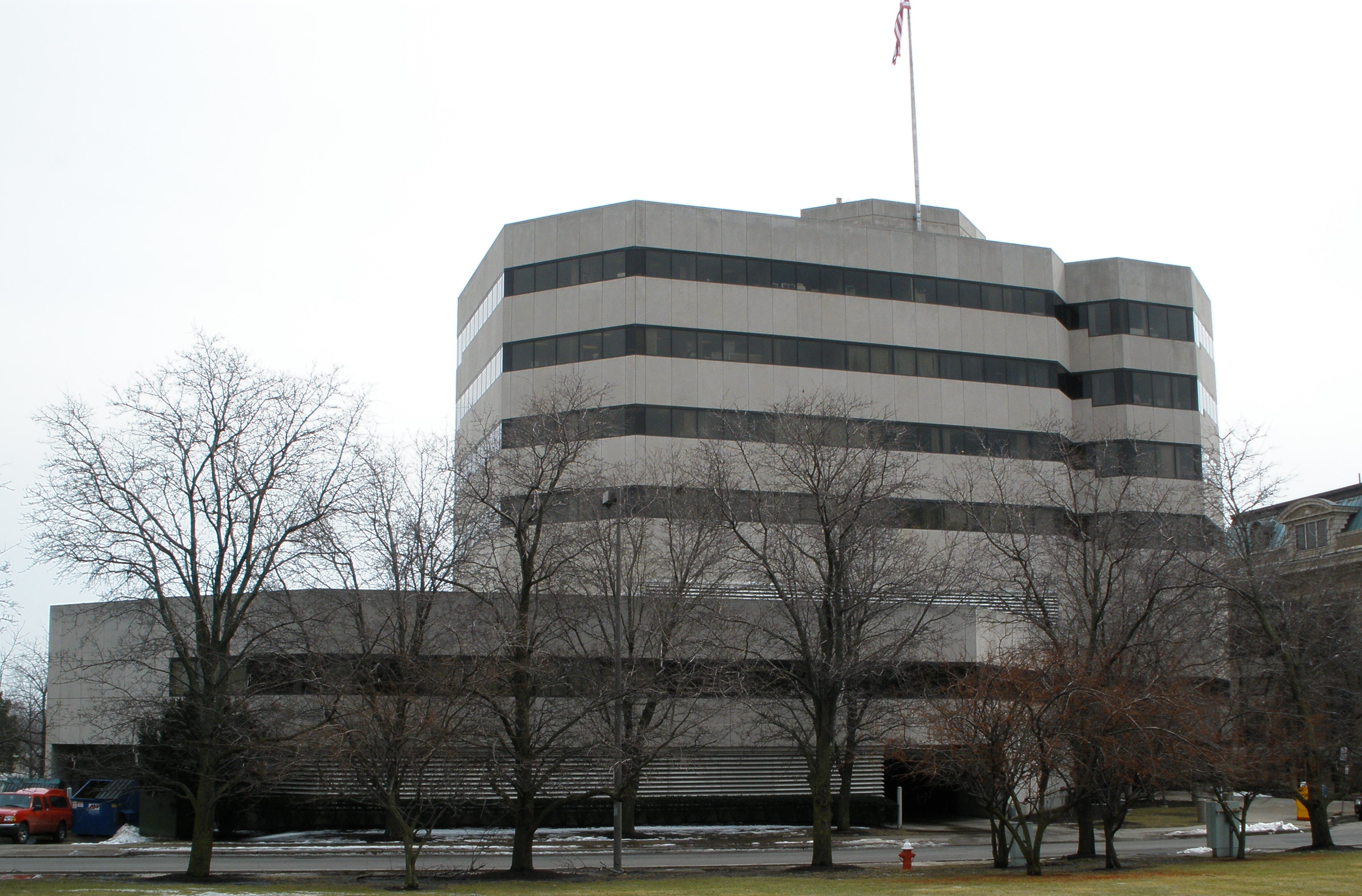
AMO's Great Lakes operations are headquartered in Toledo, Ohio.

AMO was chartered on May 12, 1949, as an affiliate of the Seafarer's International Union of North America. At the time it was called the Brotherhood of Marine Engineers. Labor leader Paul Hall was a founding figure. The original membership consisted entirely of civilian seafaring veterans of World War II. In 1953 at the SIUNA Convention, the Brotherhood of Marine Engineers gained autonomy, allowing it to adopt a constitution and elect officers.

The first constitution was drafted by Edward Reisman, Rudolph Wunsch, James Wilde, Everett Landers, Peter Geipi, and William Lovvorn, who "wanted to craft a document that would provide for free and fair elections, set the terms of office for official positions, specify the duties of union officials, provide for charges, trials, and appeals, permit rank and file membership inspection of the union's financial records, and permit amendments by rank and file vote". The constitution was adopted, with 96 percent of membership voting for adoption. The constitution called for the election of a president, two vice-presidents, and a secretary-treasurer. Wilbur Dickey was elected first president on December 15, 1953.

In September 1954, the American Federation of Labor (AFL) recognized the fledgling union, by granting it "exclusive jurisdiction within the federation over 'licensed engine room personnel on self-propelled vessels'".

The BME Welfare Plan was growing at an impressive rate under the care of Director of Welfare and Special Services Ray McKay. In August 1954, he reported its assets to be in excess of $100,000. The plan offered a number of progressive benefits, such as full surgery coverage for members and their families, and full coverage for seeing a physician. In February 1955, the union began pursuing the "first pension plan ever for U.S. merchant marine officers", which was well underway by November 1955. In 1957, Wilbur Dickey resigned the union's presidency and Ray McKay took the position on January 17, 1957. Later that year, on October 29, 1957, McKay and then-president of the Marine Engineers Beneficial Association H.L. Daggett signed an accord leading BME to merge with several MEBA locals. The newly formed entity was known as MEBA's Great Lakes District Local 101. In 1960 after an internal reorganization of MEBA, this entity was now known as "District 2 MEBA".

In 1992, while functioning as an autonomous union within MEBA, "District 2" reverted to the original "American Maritime Officers". AMO finally withdrew from MEBA in 1994 and as a result lost its affiliation with the AFL-CIO. It was, however, restored on March 12, 2004, when Michael Sacco presented AMO with a charter from SIUNA.

Today, AMO thrives as a national union representing licensed officers in all sectors of the United States merchant fleet—including ocean-going, Great Lakes and inland waters—aboard a wide range of commercial and military support vessels, as well commercial vessels operating in the international energy transportation trades. Tom Bethel was elected national president of AMO in June 2008, defeating challengers Jack Hearn and Paul Cates in the election. On January 8, 2007, Tom Bethel was appointed by the AMO national executive committee to fulfill the term of former president Michael McKay. Bethel was at that time serving as AMO's national executive vice president. He was first elected national executive vice president January 1, 2001, by a margin of 796–421 over challenger Richard Ouellette.

In the 2006 union election, Bethel ran on a slate of candidates, which included then-incumbent national president Michael McKay and then-incumbent national secretary-treasurer Robert McKay. In the election, Michael McKay was re-elected national president and Robert McKay was defeated.

On January 5, 2007, Michael and Robert McKay were convicted of racketeering charges. Michael McKay was convicted of "three counts of mail fraud and two recordkeeping offenses. He was found not guilty of embezzling from an employee benefit plan".

McKay's brother, former AMO National Secretary-Treasurer Robert McKay, was convicted of two counts of mail fraud, embezzlement, and two recordkeeping offenses. The father served as AMO president for 36 years.

Membership (US records)
View chart definition.
Finances (US records; ×$1000)
View chart definition.

=== Great Lakes Strike of 2007 ===
On May 9, 2007, the AMO went on strike against the Wisconsin & Michigan Steamship Company. The dispute focused on three Great Lakes "river class" self-unloading bulk carriers: the M/V David Z, the M/V Earl W, and the M/V Wolverine.

The ships, nearly identical in appearance, are owned by Wisconsin and Michigan Steamship Company. Headquartered in Lakewood, Ohio, the company is a subsidiary of Sand Products Corp. The ships were purchased from Oglebay Norton Corporation for $18.7 million in 2006. They were operated under time-charter agreements with Lower Lakes Transportation Co., a division of Rand Logistics Inc.

The strike was called on May 9, 2007, when the company "refused to sign a pattern agreement already agreed to by three other Great Lakes operators". The union stated that job security and benefits were the key unresolved issues. AMO members, including deck officers, marine engineer, and stewards walked off the ships on May 10, 2007. The strike delayed the Wolverine's arrival in port.

The ships stood idle in Sarnia, Ontario for some time. The strike cost the company $1 million in losses in the second quarter of 2007, according to Trade Winds. The collective bargaining agreement covering these ships expired in July 2007. All three vessels were sold by Wisconsin & Michigan Steamship Company in 2008 to Rand Logistics. One of the three, the Wolverine, was subsequently removed from the U.S. fleet and transferred to Canadian registry.

== Controversy ==
In August 2002, AMO was served with a summons and complaint by a former Plan employee alleging that AMO tortiously interfered in his employment. After a trial in 2009, the jury cleared AMO of the tortious interference charge.

During the fiscal year ending in March 2006, AMO discovered that the former National Vice-president Deep Sea, Thomas Kelly, entered into a plea agreement with the U.S. government. In the agreement he pleaded to one count charging him with embezzling $32,500 by submitting false and inflated expense vouchers from 1996 to 2001. The labor organization has initiated steps to recover the amount of the loss.

AMO is named as a respondent in a charge before the Equal Employment Opportunity Commission in New York. As of the filing of this form, the outcome of this litigation is not known.

== Presidents ==
- Charles King (1953)
- Wilbur Dickey (1953 – January 19, 1957)
- Raymond McKay (January 19, 1957 – 1993)
- Michael McKay ( 1993 – January 8, 2007)
- Tom Bethel (January 8, 2007 – December 31, 2014)
- Paul Doell (January 1, 2015 – January 31, 2024)
- Willie Barrere (January 31, 2024 – present)

== See also ==
- Seafarers International Union
- National Maritime Union
- International Seamen's Union
- MEBA
- Raymond McKay
- Michael McKay
