= Roell =

Roell or Röell is a given name and surname. Notable people with the name include:

== Surname ==
- Godfried Roëll (1908–1934), Dutch rower
- Joan Röell (1844–1914), Dutch nobleman, lawyer and statesman
- Werner Roell (1914–2008), German Luftwaffe officer

== Given name ==
- Roell Preston (born 1972), American football player
