= Shipping Commissioners Act of 1872 =

The Shipping Commissioners Act of 1872 was a United States law dealing with American mariners serving in the United States Merchant Marine.

Among other things, the act:

- was passed to combat crimps.
- required that a sailor had to sign on to a ship in the presence of a federal shipping commissioner.
- required that a seaman be paid off in person.

The presence of a shipping commissioner was intended to ensure the sailor wasn't "forcibly or unknowingly signed on by a crimp."

The legislation was modeled on England’s Merchant Shipping Act 1854.

== See also ==
- Shanghaiing
- Maritime history of the United States
- Slave Trade Acts
