= Paul Doell =

American labor leader

Paul Doell is an American labor leader. He was elected national president of American Maritime Officers in 2014 and 2018.
