= Raymond McKay =

Raymond T. McKay
- Born: November 15, 1925
- Died: August 9, 1993 (aged 67)
- Occupation: Trade union leader
- Spouse: Dolly McKay
- Website: http://www.amo-union.org

Raymond T. McKay (November 15, 1925 – August 9, 1993) was an American labor leader. He was president of American Maritime Officers (AMO) from 1957 until his death in 1993.

After World War II, McKay sailed as a second engineer on a Sinclair Oil tanker. He was active in organizing the fleet of the Isthmian Steamship Company for the Brotherhood of Maritime Engineers, which would later be renamed to American Maritime Officers. The labor agreement with Isthmian was secured in August 1951, and in 1953, McKay was chosen to direct the union's Department of Welfare and Special Services. In this position, he helped the union gain jurisdiction over the east coast tugboat industry.

In 1954, McKay was elected as one of the union's vice presidents. Three years later, Wilbur Dickey resigned the presidency and McKay took the position on January 17, 1957. Later that year, on October 29, 1957, McKay and then-president of the Marine Engineers Beneficial Association H.L. Daggett signed an accord leading BME to merge with several MEBA locals. The newly formed entity was known as MEBA's Great Lakes District Local 101. In 1960, after an internal reorganization of MEBA, this entity was now known as "District 2 MEBA."

McKay served as the union's president until his death on August 9, 1993. He was succeeded as president by his son, Michael McKay. The younger McKay later resigned the office after he was convicted of "three counts of mail fraud and two recordkeeping offenses. He was found not guilty of embezzling from an employee benefit plan.".

McKay's other son, former AMO National Secretary-Treasurer Robert McKay was convicted of two counts of mail fraud, embezzlement, and two recordkeeping offenses.

== Memorials ==
- The AMO's training facility in Dania Beach, Florida is named The Raymond T. McKay Simulation, Training, Assessment and Research Center, as was its former facility in Toledo, Ohio.

== See also ==
- American Maritime Officers
- Michael Sacco
- Harry Lundeberg
- Paul Hall (labor leader)
- Seafarers International Union
