= White Act of 1898 =

The White Act of 1898 (30 Stat. 755), formally known as An Act To amend the laws relating to American seamen, for the protection of such seamen, and to promote commerce, is a United States Federal statute governing mariners in the United States Merchant Marine.

Among other things, the act:

- abolished the practice of imprisoning sailors who deserted from vessels in "American or nearby waters."
- abolished corporal punishment of seamen

Prior to the White Act of 1898 "'bully mates'...had relied on their fists, belaying pins, and handspikes to enforce discipline."
