= John Brown =

John Brown most often refers to:

- John Brown (abolitionist) (1800–1859), American who led an anti-slavery raid on Harpers Ferry, Virginia, in 1859

John Brown or Johnny Brown may also refer to:

== Academia ==
- John Brown (educator) (1763–1842), Irish educator; third president of the University of Georgia
- John Carter Brown (1797–1874), American book collector and antiquarian
- John Macmillan Brown (1845–1935), Scottish-New Zealand academic, administrator and promoter of education for women
- John Nicholas Brown I (1861–1900), American book collector and antiquarian
- John Lott Brown (1924–2011), American university administrator and professor
- John H. Brown (scholar) (born 1948), American scholar of public diplomacy

== Arts and entertainment ==
=== Literature ===
- John Brown (historian) (died c. 1829), English miscellaneous writer
- John Mason Brown (1900–1969), American literary critic
- Sir John Gilbert Newton Brown (1916–2003), English book publisher
- John Gregory Brown (born 1960), American novelist
- John Brown (American author) (born 1966), American novelist and short story writer

=== Performing arts ===
- John Browne (composer) (1453–c. 1500), English composer
- John Brown (actor) (1904–1957), English radio and film actor
- Johnny Mack Brown (1904–1974), American film actor and college football player
- Johnny Brown (actor) (1937–2022), American actor and singer
- John Moulder-Brown (born 1953), English actor
- John W. Brown (set decorator) (fl. 1960s–1970s)

=== Visual arts ===
- John Brown (artist) (1752–1787), Scottish artist
- John Crawford Brown (1805–1867), Scottish landscape painter
- John Lewis Brown (1829–1892), French battle, animal, and genre painter
- John George Brown (1831–1913), English-born American painter
- John William Brown (artist) (1842–1928), English painter and stained-glass designer
- John Appleton Brown (1844–1902), American painter
- John Arnesby Brown (1866–1955), English landscape artist

== Business and industry ==
- John Brown (1723–1808), Scottish-Danish merchant and shipowner
- John Brown (brewer) (1795–1890), English brewer
- John Brown (builder) (1809–1876), Canadian builder
- John Brown (coalmine owner) (1850–1930), coal baron and shipowner in New South Wales, Australia
- Sir John Brown (industrialist) (1816–1896), British industrialist; founder of the Atlas steelworks
- John Albert Brown (1885–1944), American oilman and president of Mobil
- John Bundy Brown (1805–1881), American industrialist, owner of the Portland Sugar Company
- John Crosby Brown (1838–1909), American banker; partner in Brown Bros. & Co.
- John W. Brown (labor leader) (1867–1941), Canadian-born labor leader in the United States
- John Brown (trade unionist) (1880/81–1961), British trade union leader and local councilor
- John W. Brown (British trade unionist) (1886–?), British activist, general secretary of the International Federation of Trade Unions
- John Seely Brown (born 1940), American researcher in organizational studies
- John W. Brown (corporate executive) (fl. 1980s–2010s), American executive; president of Stryker Corporation

== Military ==
- John Brown (British Army officer, died 1762), British Army general
- John Brown (British Army soldier) (1908–1965), Royal Artillery quartermaster sergeant and espionage agent
- John Brown of Pittsfield (1744–1780), American Revolutionary War officer
- John Brown (sailor) (1826–1883), American sailor and Civil War Medal of Honor recipient
- John Harties Brown (1834–1905), Canadian soldier who fought in the American Civil War
- John Brown (Medal of Honor) (c. 1838–?), American sailor and peacetime Medal of Honor recipient
- John H. Brown (Medal of Honor) (1842–1898), American soldier and Civil War Medal of Honor recipient
- John H. Brown Jr. (1891–1963), United States Navy admiral and American football player
- John Nicholas Brown II (1900–1979), U.S. Assistant Secretary of the Navy
- John Brown Jr. (Navajo code talker) (1921–2009), American Navajo code talker during World War II
- John M. Brown III (fl. 1960s–2000s), United States Army general
- John S. Brown (general) (born 1949), United States Army brigadier general; Chief Historian of the United States Army Center of Military History
- John Marshall Brown (1838–1907), American commissioned officer during the American Civil War

== Politics and law ==
=== Australia ===
- John Brown (New South Wales politician) (1821–1896), member of the New South Wales Legislative Assembly
- John Alexander Voules Brown (1852–1945), member of the South Australian House of Assembly
- John Brown (Queensland politician) (1881–1949), blacksmith and member of the Queensland Legislative Assembly
- John Brown (Tasmanian politician) (1886–1974), member of the Tasmanian House of Assembly
- John Brown (Australian politician) (born 1931), member of the Australian House of Representatives
- John Brown (Western Australian politician) (1867–1930), member of the Western Australian Legislative Council

=== Canada ===
- John Brown (Upper Canada politician) (1791–1842), Irish-born Canadian politician
- John Lothrop Brown (1815–1887), Canadian political figure in Nova Scotia
- John Brown (Richmond Hill politician) (fl. 1870s–1880s), Canadian politician
- John Brown (Canadian politician) (1841–1905), member of Parliament
- John Cameron Brown (c. 1843–?), Canadian political figure in New Brunswick
- John Cunningham Brown (1844–1929), Irish-born political figure in British Columbia
- John Brown (Ontario MPP) (1849–1924), member of Ontario assembly and mayor of Stratford, Ontario
- John Robert Brown (British Columbia politician) (1862–1947), Canadian politician
- John Livingstone Brown (1867–1953), Canadian politician
- John G. Brown (1900–1958), Ontario politician
- John L. Brown (Ontario politician) (1921–2004), Canadian politician

=== United Kingdom ===
- John Brown (Wales MP) (died c. 1654)
- Sir John McLeavy Brown (1835–1926), British lawyer and diplomat
- John Wesley Brown (1873–1944), British MP for Middlesbrough East

=== United States ===
==== Kentucky ====
- John Brown (Kentucky politician, born 1757) (1757–1837), U.S. representative and U.S. senator; member of Continental Congress from Virginia
- John Y. Brown (politician, born 1835) (1835–1904), governor, U.S. representative for Kentucky
- John Y. Brown Sr. (1900–1985), U.S. representative for Kentucky
- John Y. Brown Jr. (1933–2022), governor
- John Young Brown III (born 1963), Kentucky Secretary of State

==== Other U.S. states ====
- John Brown (Rhode Island politician) (1736–1803), U.S. representative, co-founder of Brown University
- John Brown (North Carolina politician) (1738–1812), pioneer and statesman
- John Brown (Maryland politician) (1760–1815), U.S. representative
- John Brown (Pennsylvania politician) (1772–1845), U.S. representative
- Red Brown (politician) (1786–1852), Speaker of the Texas House of Representatives
- John W. Brown (New York politician) (1796–1875), U.S. representative
- John Brown (Cherokee chief) (fl. 1830s)
- John S. Brown (Michigan politician) (born c. 1810), Michigan state representative
- John Brown (mountain man) (1817–1889), fur trapper and trader around Pueblo, Colorado from 1841 to 1849
- John Henry Brown (1820–1895), Texas politician, chaired Texas articles of Secession
- John C. Brown (1827–1889), Confederate general, Tennessee governor
- John S. Brown (Maryland politician) (c. 1810–1878), American politician
- John B. Brown (1836–1898), U.S. representative for Maryland
- John Robert Brown (Virginia politician) (1842–1927), U.S. representative
- John Brown (Seminole chief) (1842–1919), Seminole chief and Confederate States Army officer
- John C. Brown (Ohio politician) (1844–1900), American politician
- John T. Brown (1876–1951), Ohio lieutenant governor
- John Thomas Brown (politician) (1857–1942), mayor of Fort Worth, Texas
- John Robert Brown (judge) (1909–1993), member of the U.S. Court of Appeals for the Fifth Circuit
- John William Brown (1913–1993), Ohio governor
- J. Marshall Brown (1926–1995), Louisiana state representative and Democratic national committeeman
- John Brown Jr. (abolitionist) (1821–1895), American abolitionist

=== Other countries ===
- John Evans Brown (1827–1895), American-born member of New Zealand parliament

== Religion ==
- John Brown of Priesthill (1627–1685), Scottish Protestant martyr
- John Brown (essayist) (1715–1766), English clergyman
- John Brown of Haddington (1722–1787), Scottish clergyman and Biblical commentator
- John Brown (Vicar of St Mary's, Leicester) (c. 1792–1845), British evangelical preacher
- John Brown (minister) (1784–1858), Scottish clergyman and writer
- John Newton Brown (1803–1868), Baptist teacher, minister and publisher
- John Croumbie Brown (1808–1895), Scottish missionary and forestry pioneer in South Africa
- John M. Brown (1817–1852), American bishop in the African Methodist Episcopal church
- John Brown (Mormon pioneer) (1820–1897), American Mormon leader
- John Brown (writer) (1830–1922), British theologian, historian, and pastor
- John Henry Hobart Brown (1831–1888), American Episcopal bishop of Fond du Lac, Wisconsin
- John Brown (moderator) (1850–1919), Scottish minister
- John E. Brown (evangelist) (1879–1957), American evangelist, founder of John Brown University
- John J. Brown (fl. 1915), American Roman Catholic priest and educator
- John Brown (bishop) (1931–2011), English Anglican bishop
- John Brown of Wamphray (1610–1679), Scottish church leader
- John Pierce Brown (1843–1925), Irish Anglican priest

== Science and medicine ==
- John Brown (physician, born 1735) (1735–1788), Scottish physician
- John Brown (geographer) (1797–1861), English geographer
- John Brown (physician, born 1810) (1810–1882), Scottish physician and essayist
- John Coggin Brown (1884–1962), British geologist
- John Ronald Brown (1922–2010), unlicensed United States sex-change operation surgeon
- John Campbell Brown (1947–2019), Scottish astronomer

== Sports ==
=== American football ===
- John Brown (center) (1922–2009), center and linebacker
- John Brown (offensive tackle) (born 1939), American NFL football offensive tackle
- John Brown (offensive lineman) (born 1988), American football offensive lineman
- John Brown (wide receiver) (born 1990), American NFL football wide receiver
- Jon Brown (American football) (born 1992), American NFL football placekicker

=== Association football ===
- John Arnesby Brown (1866–1955), English footballer born in Nottingham
- John Brown (footballer, born 1876) (c. 1876–?), Scottish footballer for Sunderland
- John Brown (footballer, born 1887) (1887–1943), Scottish footballer born in Clackmannan
- John Brown (footballer, born 1888) (1888–?), English footballer born in Liverpool
- Jonathan Brown (English footballer) (1893–1918), born in Clayton-le-Moors, Lancashire
- John Brown (footballer, born 1890) (1890-unknown), Scottish footballer see List of Bury F.C. players (25–99 appearances)
- John Brown (footballer, born 1890s), Scottish professional footballer born in Glasgow
- John Brown (footballer, born 1901) (1901–1977), English footballer born in Eastwood, Nottinghamshire
- John Brown (1920s footballer), English footballer for Rochdale
- John Brown (footballer, born 1915) (1915–2005), Scottish football player born in Troon
- John Brown (footballer, born 1921) (1921–1989), English footballer born in Crook, County Durham
- John Brown (footballer, born 1935) (1935–2000), Scottish football left-back born in Edinburgh
- John Brown (footballer, born March 1940), Scottish football wing-half born in Edinburgh
- John Brown (footballer, born July 1940), English footballer born in Wadebridge, Cornwall
- John Brown (footballer, born 1947) (1947–2024), English football goalkeeper born in Bradford, Yorkshire
- John Brown (footballer, born 1962), Scottish football player and manager born in Lennoxtown
- Jock Brown (John Winton Brown, born 1946), Scottish football commentator

=== Australian rules football ===
- John Brown (Australian footballer, born 1923) (1923–2007), Australian rules footballer for Carlton
- John Brown (Australian footballer, born 1937) (1937–2001), Australian rules footballer for Geelong
- John Brown (Australian footballer, born 1944) (1944–2001), Australian rules footballer for Geelong

=== Basketball ===
- John Brown (basketball, born 1951), American former basketball player in the NBA
- John Brown (basketball, born 1992), American basketball player
- John Y. Brown Jr. (1933–2022), American basketball owner

=== Cricket ===
- John Brown (cricketer, born 1807) (1807–1883), English cricketer
- John Brown (cricketer, born 1820) (1820–?), English cricketer
- John Brown (cricketer, born 1862) (1862–?), English cricketer
- Jack Brown (cricketer) (1869–1904), English cricketer
- John Brown (cricketer, born 1874) (1874–1950), English cricketer
- John Brown (cricketer, born 1890) (1890–1968), English cricketer
- John Brown (umpire) (1928–2005), New Zealand Test match umpire

=== Rugby football ===
- John Blair Brown (1856–1904), Scottish rugby union player
- John Alf Brown (1881–1936), Welsh international rugby union player
- Johnny Brown (rugby league) (born 1943), Australian rugby league footballer
- John Brown (rugby league) (c. 1886–1965), New Zealand rugby league player

=== Other sports ===
- John Brown (1890s pitcher) (1876–1908), American baseball player
- John Brown (1940s pitcher) (1918–1999), American baseball player
- Jackie Brown (English boxer) or John Brown (1909–1971), English boxer
- John Brown (cyclist) (1916–1990), New Zealand cyclist
- John Brown (bobsleigh) (1935–2019), British Olympic bobsledder
- John Brown (bodybuilder) (fl. 1980s), American bodybuilder
- John Brown (runner) (fl. 2000s–2010s), British competitor in the 2010 World Long Distance Mountain Running Challenge
- John Brown (tennis) (born 1940), Australian sports promoter and tennis player
- Jonny Brown (cyclist) (born 1997), American cyclist
- John Brown (runner, born c. 1954), Myers Park HS middle-distance runner and winner of the 1974 4 × 880 yard relay at the NCAA Division I Indoor Track and Field Championships

== Other people ==
- John Brown (architect) (1805–1876), British architect
- John Brown (fugitive slave) (c. 1810–1876), American author of Slave Life in Georgia: A Narrative of the Life, Sufferings and Escape of John Brown
- John Brown (servant) (1826–1883), Scottish servant and close friend of Queen Victoria
- J. Ednie Brown (1848–1899), Scottish author on sylviculture and state conservator of forests
- John Brown (colonist) (c. 1801–1879), English colonist in South Australia
- John Brown (bridge) (1887–?), English contract-bridge player and author
- John A. Brown Jr. (c. 1962–1997), American murderer executed in Louisiana for the murder of Omer Laughlin

== Other uses ==
=== Artistic uses ===
- "John Brown's Body", Union marching song of the American Civil War
- John Brown (The Shop Girl), fictional millionaire in The Shop Girl (1894)
- John Brown (biography), 1909 biography of the abolitionist by W.E.B. Du Bois
- "John Brown" (song) by Bob Dylan (1962)
- John Brown, fictional sheriff in "I Shot the Sheriff" by Bob Marley (1973)
- "John Brown", a song by the Masters of Reality from Masters of Reality (1989)
- John Brown, fictional character in Ghost Hunt (1989–1992)
- John Brown, fictional physician in Like Water for Chocolate (1992)
- John Brown, fictional protagonist of Inspector Gadget (1999)
- John Brown's Body (band), an American reggae band

=== Business and legal uses ===
- Virginia v. John Brown, 1859 trial of the abolitionist
- John Brown & Company, shipbuilding company in Clydebank, Scotland
- John Brown Media, British magazine publisher
- John A. Brown (department store), Oklahoma-based department store chain
- John Brown Stone Warehouse, historic commercial building in Fort Wayne
- John Brown University, college in Siloam Springs, Arkansas
- John Douglass Brown House, historic house in Alexandria, Virginia

=== Military uses ===
- John Brown Battery, American volunteer artillery unit in the Lincoln Battalion during the Spanish Civil War
- SS John W. Brown, American Liberty ship
- SS John W. Brown II, American Victory ship

== See also ==
- John Young Brown (disambiguation)
- Jonathan Brown (disambiguation)
- John Browne (disambiguation)
- Jack Brown (disambiguation)
- Jackie Brown (disambiguation)
