= John S. Brown =

John S. Brown may refer to:

- John S. Brown (general) (fl. 1970s–2000s), United States Army brigadier general; Chief Historian of the United States Army Center of Military History
- John S. Brown (Maryland politician), American politician
- John S. Brown (Michigan politician) (born c. 1810), Michigan state representative
- John Seely Brown (born 1940), American researcher in organizational studies

== See also ==
- John Brown (disambiguation)
