= Jonathan Brown =

Jon or Jonathan Brown may refer to:

== Sports ==
=== Football ===
==== Association football ====
- Jonathan Brown (English footballer) (1893–1918), English left half
- Jonathan Brown (Scottish footballer) (born 1990), Scottish defender (Hearts, Livingston, Stirling)
- Jonathan Brown (Welsh footballer) (born 1990), Welsh winger

==== Other football variants ====
- Jon Brown (American football) (born 1992), NFL placekicker
- Jonathan Brown (gridiron football) (born 1975), American defensive lineman in NFL, CFL and AFL
- Jonathan Brown (Australian footballer) (born 1981), AFL centre half-forward

=== Other sports ===
- Jon Brown (rower) (born 1968), American Olympian
- Jon Brown (runner) (born 1971), British-Canadian Olympian
- Jon Brown (weightlifter) (born 1943/1944), American Paralympic athlete and weightlifter

== Others ==
- Jonathan Brown (art historian) (1939–2022), American expert on painter Diego Velázquez
- Jonathan David Brown (1955–2016), American record producer and audio engineer
- Jonathan Brown (cinematographer), American cinematographer and television director
- Jonathan A. C. Brown (born 1977), American Muslim scholar at Georgetown University

== See also ==
- Jonathan Browne (1601–1643), English Anglican clergyman, Dean of Hereford from 1637
- John Brown (disambiguation)
- List of people with surname Brown
