= Johnny Brown =

Johnny Brown may refer to:

- Johnny Brown (Scottish boxer) (1901–1961), Scottish boxer, former British welterweight champion
- Johnny Brown (English boxer) (1902–1976), English boxer
- Johnny Mack Brown (1904–1974), American college football player and film actor
- Texas Johnny Brown (1928–2013), American blues guitarist, songwriter and singer
- Johnny Brown (actor) (1937–2022), American actor and singer
- Johnny Brown (rugby league) (born 1943), Australian rugby league player
- Johnny Brown (basketball) (born 1963), American basketball player and coach
- Johnny Brown, character in the Australian TV series Neighbours
- Johny Brown, singer with The Band of Holy Joy

== See also ==
- John Brown (disambiguation)
