= John W. Brown =

John W. Brown may refer to:

- John W. Brown (British trade unionist) (1886–?), British activist, general secretary of the International Federation of Trade Unions
- John W. Brown (corporate executive) (fl. 1980s–2010s), American executive; president of Stryker Corporation
- John W. Brown (labor leader) (1867–1941), Canadian-born labor leader in the United States
- John W. Brown (New York politician) (1796–1875), U.S. representative
- John W. Brown (set decorator) (fl. 1960s–1970s)
- John Wesley Brown (1873–1944), British MP for Middlesbrough East
- John Wesley Brown (1940s pitcher) (1918–1999), American baseball player
- John William Brown (1913–1993), Ohio governor
- John William Brown (artist) (1842–1928), English painter and stained-glass designer
- SS John W. Brown, American Liberty ship
- SS John W. Brown II, American Victory ship
