= The Painter Brown and His Family =

Painting by Giovanni Boldini

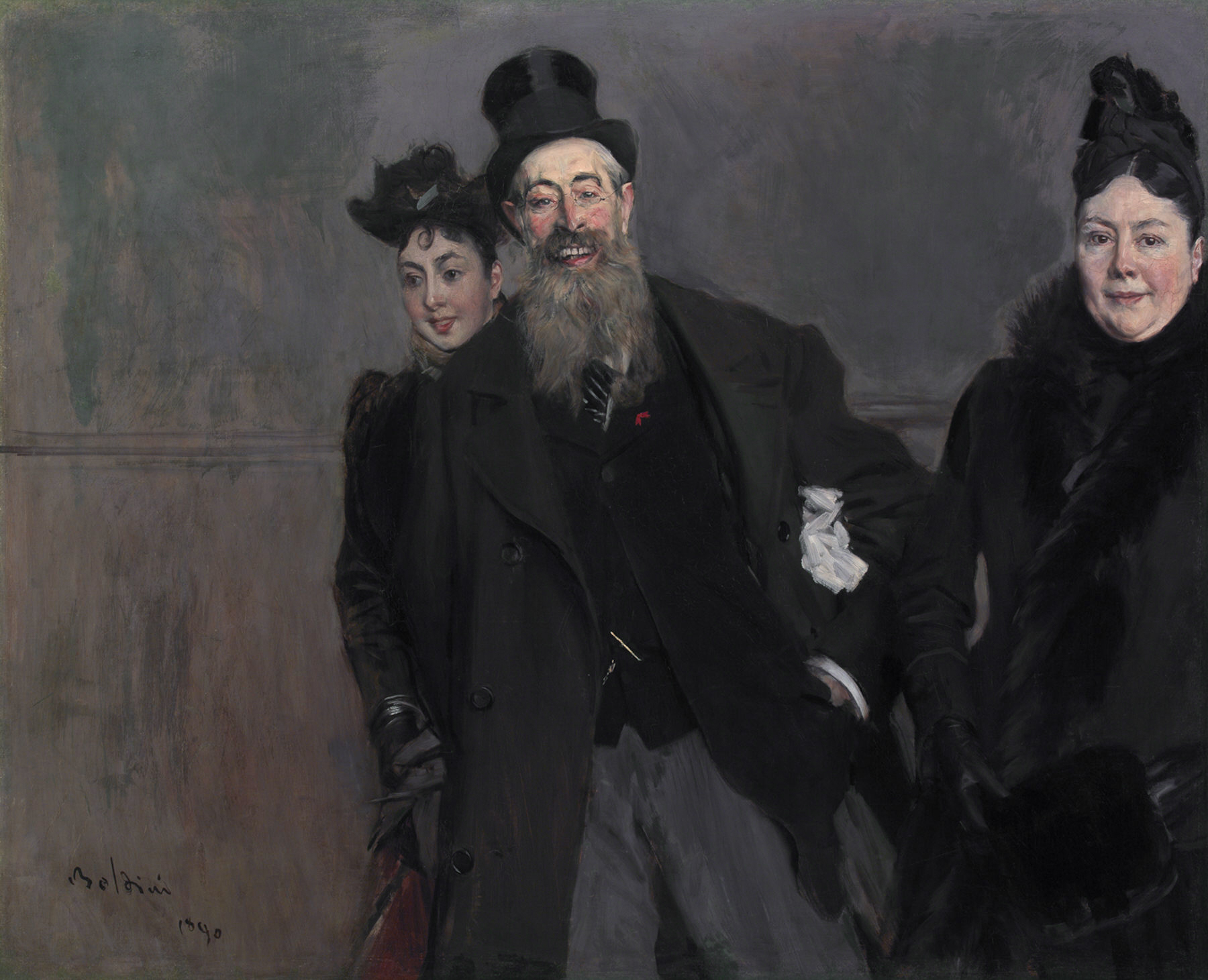
- Artist: Giovanni Boldini
- Year: 1890
- Medium: Oil on canvas
- Dimensions: 120 cm × 145 cm (47 in × 57 in)
- Location: Museu Calouste Gulbenkian, Lisbon

The Painter Brown and His Family, also known as The Painter John Lewis Brown with His Wife and Daughter, is an oil on canvas painting by the Italian painter Giovanni Boldini, from 1890. It is held at the Museu Calouste Gulbenkian, in Lisbon.

== History ==
This triple portrait depicts the French painter and engraver John Lewis Brown, from Bordeaux, of Scottish origin, in the center, surrounded by his wife and daughter. Brown was known for his battle scenes and his animal paintings of dogs and horses. This painting was exhibited at the Salon of French Artists of 1890, where it was noticed by the public and critics, few months before the death of Brown.

== Description and analysis ==
At first glance, everything suggests that this is an exterior scene. The happy faces, the coats and the hats are captured in movement and offset from each other. The painting seems to give the impression that it shows the sitters during a walk. The central character, bantering, seems to be looking to the painter, as if he was passing by him in the middle of the street. However, the molding on the left indicates that the scene actually takes place indoors, probably in Boldini's workshop. Brown is smiling, and his wife is at his right side, also smiling to the viewer, while is daughter is depicted, at his left. She smiles too but doesn't look directly to the viewer, unlike her parents.

The painting is noted for its restrained colour palette, dominated by brown and black tones, with several luminous details drawing attention, including the subject's gaze, the ribbon of the Legion of Honour on Brown's lapel, and a white object beneath his arm, possibly a folded newspaper. Executed with rapid zigzag brushstrokes, the work has been described by art historians as emphasising the lively presence of its central figure.
