= Project Liberty =

Project Liberty may refer to:

== Technology ==
- Liberty Alliance Project, a broad-based industry standards consortium developing suites of specifications defining federated identity management and web services communication protocols
- Project Liberty, a non-profit initiative to create a new internet infrastructure
- Project LIBERTY, a cellulosic ethanol endeavor by Jeff Broin

== Military ==
- Project Liberty Ship, a non-profit organization found in 1978 to save a Liberty Ship, the SS John W. Brown as a memorial for men and women of Liberty Ships during World War II
- Project Liberty, a USAF plan to rapidly create and field the MC-12W aircraft for Intelligence, Surveillance & Reconnaissance

== Comics ==
- The Liberty Project, a team of former supervillains into superheroes of Eclipse Comics

== Politics ==
- Free State Project, a libertarian political migration movement
