= Jack Brown =

Jack Brown or Browne may refer to:

- Jack Alan Brown (born 2001), Indonesian football player
- John Alf Brown (1881–1936), known as Jack Brown, Welsh rugby player
- Jack Brown (American football) (1902–1987), American football player for the Dayton Triangles
- Jack Brown (Australian footballer) (1886–1950), Australian rules footballer for St Kilda
- Jack Brown (cricketer) (1869–1904), English cricketer
- Jack Brown (footballer, born 1899) (1899–1962), English football goalkeeper
- Jack Brown (footballer, born 2001), Scottish footballer
- Jack Brown (rower) (1920–2001), English rower
- Jack Brown (rugby league) (born 2000), English rugby league footballer
- Jack Brown (rugby union) (born 2005), Scottish rugby union player
- Jack Brown (trade unionist) (1929–1991), British trade union leader
- Jack Brown (wheelchair rugby league), English wheelchair rugby league footballer
- Jack Browne, Baron Craigton (1904–1993), Scottish Tory politician
- Jack Browne (hurler) (born 1993), Irish hurler

== See also ==
- Jack Brown Genius, a New Zealand romantic fantasy film
- Jackie Brown (disambiguation)
- John Brown (disambiguation)
