= List of cricket and rugby league players =

This is a list of sports people who have played both cricket and rugby league at a high level.

Until recently, Scotland, Ireland and Wales all played as part of the English dominated Great Britain team.

Due to the historical relationship between rugby league and rugby union, many of these players have also competed in high level rugby union as well.

== Australia ==
Name	Cricket Team(s)	Rugby league team(s)
Johnny Brown	Queensland cricket team	Norths (Brisbane), Queensland rugby league team, Australia national rugby league team
Leslie Cody	New South Wales cricket team, Victoria cricket team	Eastern Suburbs (NSWRL)
Herbie Collins	Australia national cricket team	Eastern Suburbs (NSWRL)
Bill Farnsworth	New South Wales cricket team, Lancashire County Cricket Club	Newtown (NSWRL), Oldham, New South Wales rugby league team, Queensland rugby league team, Australia national rugby league team
Andrew Johns	New South Wales cricket team	Newcastle Knights, Warrington Wolves, New South Wales rugby league team, Australia national rugby league team
Graeme Hughes	New South Wales cricket team	Canterbury-Bankstown Bulldogs, New South Wales rugby league team
Jock Livingston	New South Wales cricket team, Northamptonshire County Cricket Club	South Sydney (NSWRL)
Ray Lindwall	Australia national cricket team	St. George (NSWRL)
Rex Norman	New South Wales cricket team	Annandale, Eastern Suburbs, South Sydney (NSWRL), New South Wales rugby league team
Ward Prentice	New South Wales cricket team	Western Suburbs (NSWRL)
Jack Scott	New South Wales cricket team, South Australia cricket team, Test Umpire	Newtown (NSWRL)
Dudley Seddon	New South Wales cricket team	Newtown (NSWRL), New South Wales rugby league team
Courtney Winfield-Hill	Brisbane Heat, Queensland Fire	Leeds Rhinos, England women's national rugby league team

== England ==
Name	Cricket club(s)	Rugby league team(s)
Ted Bateson	Lancashire County Cricket Club	Wakefield Trinity
Liam Botham	Hampshire County Cricket Club	Leeds Rhinos, Wigan Warriors
John Gray	Warwickshire County Cricket Club	Great Britain national rugby league team
Alan Wharton	England cricket team	Salford

== New Zealand ==
Name	Cricket club(s)	Rugby league team(s)
John Ackland	Auckland cricket team	New Zealand national rugby league team
Sel Belsham	Auckland cricket team	New Zealand national rugby league team
Charles Finlayson	Auckland cricket team, Wellington cricket team	New Zealand national rugby league team
Verdun Scott	New Zealand national cricket team	New Zealand national rugby league team

== Papua New Guinea ==
Name	Cricket club(s)	Rugby league team(s)
Gima Keimolo	Papua New Guinea national cricket team	Papua New Guinea national rugby league team

== Wales ==
The Wales national cricket team plays only rarely, and the nation of Wales is usually subsumed under England for cricketing purposes.

Name	Cricket club(s)	Rugby league team(s)
Keith Jarrett	Glamorgan County Cricket Club	Wales national rugby league team
Alan Rees	Glamorgan County Cricket Club	Leeds

== See also ==
- List of cricket and rugby union players
- List of players who have converted from one football code to another
