= Jackie Brown (disambiguation) =

Jackie Brown is a 1997 crime film directed by Quentin Tarantino.

Jackie Brown may also refer to:

== Music ==
- Jackie Brown (soundtrack), a 1997 soundtrack to the film
- "Jackie Brown", a 1989 song by John Mellencamp from Big Daddy
- Jackie Brown Jr, an Australian indie rock/soul band featuring rapper DOBBY

== People ==
- Jackie Brown (English boxer) (1909–1971), English flyweight boxer
- Jackie Brown (footballer) (1914–1990), Irish footballer of the 1930s
- Jackie Brown (Scottish boxer) (1935–2020), Scottish flyweight boxer
- Jackie Brown (baseball) (1943–2017), American baseball pitcher
- Jackie Brown (swimmer), English swimmer

== See also ==
- Jack Brown (disambiguation)
- John Brown (disambiguation)
- Jacky Brown (born 1975), Cape Verdean rapper
