= John Brown (cricketer, born 1890) =

English cricketer

Personal information
- Full name: John Dowell Brown
- Born: 25 August 1890; Coventry, Warwickshire, England
- Died: 18 March 1968 (aged 77); Leamington Spa, Warwickshire, England
- Batting: Left-handed
- Bowling: Slow left-arm orthodox

Domestic team information
- Years: Team
- 1913–1914: Warwickshire

Career statistics
Competition	First-class
Matches	9
Runs scored	12
Batting average	1.71
100s/50s	–/–
Top score	7
Balls bowled	576
Wickets	9
Bowling average	29.33
5 wickets in innings	–
10 wickets in match	–
Best bowling	4/18
Catches/stumpings	4/–
- Source: Cricinfo, 27 December 2011

John Dowell Brown (25 August 1890 – 18 March 1968) was an English cricketer. Brown was a left-handed batsman who bowled slow left-arm orthodox. He was born at Coventry, Warwickshire.

Brown made his first-class debut for Warwickshire against Worcestershire at Tipton Road, Dudley in the 1913 County Championship. He made eight further first-class appearances for the county, the last of which came against Sussex in the 1914 County Championship. In his nine first-class matches, he took 9 wickets at a bowling average of 29.33, with best figures of 4/18. With the bat, he scored 12 runs at an average of 1.71, with a high score of 7.

He died at Leamington Spa, Warwickshire on 18 March 1968.
