= John Brown (Vicar of St Mary's, Leicester) =

Vicar of St. Mary's Leicester

John Brown (c. 1792 – 1845) attended Queens' College, Cambridge. He was vicar of St. Mary's, Leicester and famous for his evangelical preaching.
