= John Pierce Brown =

Irish Anglican cleric

John Pierce Brown (1843–1925) was a senior priest in the Diocese of Down, Connor and Dromore from 1899 to 1923.

Brown was educated at Trinity College, Dublin and ordained in 1868. After a curacy at Kilmore, he was appointed Rector of Loughinisland in 1870; and Precentor of Down in 1875. He was Archdeacon of Down from 1899 to 1912; and Dean of Down from 1913 until he retired in 1923.
