= John Brown (cricketer, born 1807) =

English cricketer

Personal information
- Full name: John Brown
- Born: 29 March 1807; Nottingham, Nottinghamshire, England
- Died: 5 June 1883 (aged 76); Nottingham, Nottinghamshire, England
- Batting: Unknown

Career statistics
Competition	First-class
Matches	1
Runs scored	4
Batting average	2.00
100s/50s	–/–
Top score	4
Catches/stumpings	–/–
- Source: Cricinfo, 24 March 2019

John Brown (29 March 1807 – 5 June 1883) was an English first-class cricketer.

Brown made a single appearance in first-class cricket for the Players of Nottinghamshire against the Gentlemen of Nottinghamshire at Trent Bridge in 1842. Batting twice in the match, Brown was dismissed for 4 runs in the Players first-innings by William Hillyer, while in their second-innings he was dismissed without scoring by Jemmy Dean. He died at Nottingham in June 1883.
