= John Brown (Australian footballer, born 1944) =

Australian rules footballer

Personal information
- Full name: John Brown
- Born: 24 October 1944
- Died: 22 November 2001 (aged 57)
- Original team: Coragulac
- Height: 179 cm (5 ft 10 in)
- Weight: 76 kg (168 lb)

Playing career^{1}
Years	Club	Games (Goals)
1967	Geelong	5 (1)
- ^{1} Playing statistics correct to the end of 1967.

John Brown (24 October 1944 – 22 November 2001) was an Australian rules footballer who played with Geelong in the Victorian Football League (VFL).
