= John Brown (bridge) =

John Brown (1887–?) of Grimsby, Lincolnshire, was an English contract bridge player and writer. He was the winner of the National Pairs, Northern Area in 1952. His best-known book is Winning Defence (1952) which has been regarded as making a "major contribution to the technical development of the game". He was a contributor to many periodicals.

Brown was the head ("County Captain") of the Lincolnshire Contract Bridge Association for several years starting in 1947.

== Publications ==
- Brown, John (1947). Winning Tricks. London: Gerald Duckworth & Co. Ltd. 300 pages. Various reprints to 1955.
- Brown, John (1952). Winning Defence. London: Gerald Duckworth & Co. Ltd. 343 pages. Various reprints to 1960.
- Brown, John (1961). Bidding Craft. London: Gerald Duckworth & Co. Ltd. 133 pages.
- Brown, John (1965). Bridge With Dora. London: Gerald Duckworth & Co. Ltd. 172 pages.
