= Jack Brown (Australian footballer) =

Australian rules footballer

Personal information
- Full name: John Campsie Brown
- Born: 4 July 1886; South Melbourne, Victoria
- Died: 13 February 1950 (aged 63); Highett, Victoria
- Original team: Caulfield Juniors

Playing career^{1}
Years	Club	Games (Goals)
1909–10	St Kilda	11 (4)
- ^{1} Playing statistics correct to the end of 1910.

John Campsie Brown (4 July 1886 – 13 February 1950) was an Australian rules footballer who played with St Kilda in the Victorian Football League (VFL).
