= John Brown Stone Warehouse =

- U.S. National Register of Historic Places
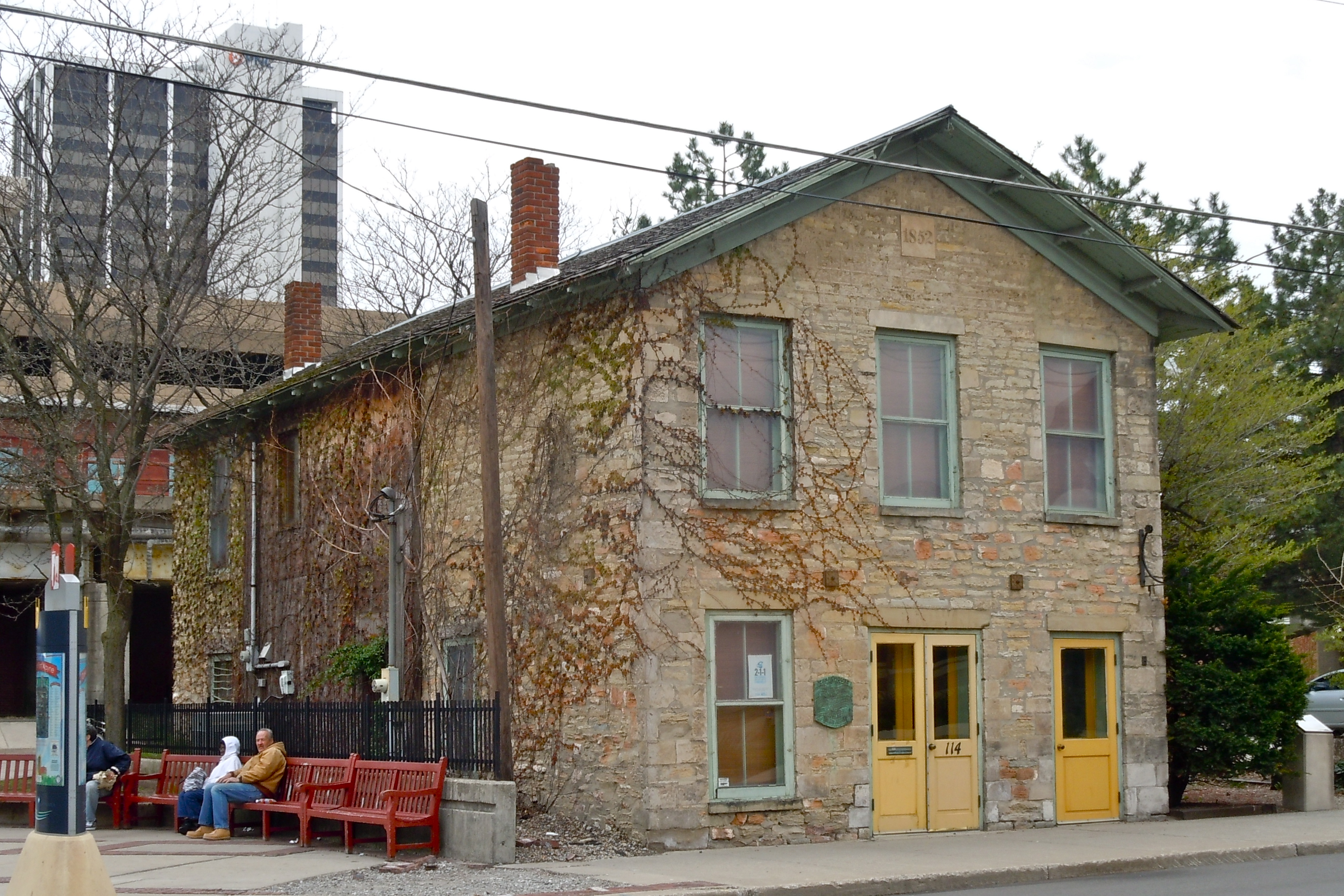
- John Brown Stone Warehouse, April 2011

- Location within Indiana Location within the United States
- Location: 114 W. Superior St., Fort Wayne, Indiana
- Coordinates: 41°4′56″N 85°8′23″W
- Area: less than one acre
- Built: 1852
- Built by: Brown, John
- Architectural style: Mid 19th Century Revival, Gable front
- NRHP reference No.: 97001542
- Added to NRHP: December 15, 1997

The John Brown Stone Warehouse, also known as the Canal House, is a historic commercial building located in downtown Fort Wayne, Indiana. It was built in 1852, and is a two-story, three-bay, gable front stone building. The building measures 22 feet wide and 50 feet deep. It was built by John Brown out of salvage and "waste" materials from his business as stone merchant and mason. It is the oldest commercial building in Fort Wayne and has been renovated to house offices.

The building is the last remaining intact structure associated with the Wabash and Erie Canal left in Allen County. Its builder and namesake, John Brown (a Scottish American immigrant originally from Glasgow), was a stonecutter. Brown, who imported and exported goods via the Canal, used the building as both a warehouse and a workshop. Brown later worked as a grocer, a contractor, and was associated with both the Fort Wayne Gas Light Company and a local bank. The building then came under the ownership of the Lillie brothers, who dealt in stone, lime, cement, and plaster. Henry Drover (a German immigrant from Bremen who served as mayor of Huntington, Indiana), who manufactured and shipped wood products via the Canal, purchased the warehouse in 1862. By 1895, the New York, Chicago, & St. Louis Railway company owned the building and used it to store and ship railroad freight. In 1970, the Railway donated the building to the city government. In 1976, the building was renovated into an office space as part of a U.S. Bicentennial project. The local fine arts organization, Arts United, had their offices located in the building.

It was listed on the National Register of Historic Places in 1997.
