= Project Liberty Ship =

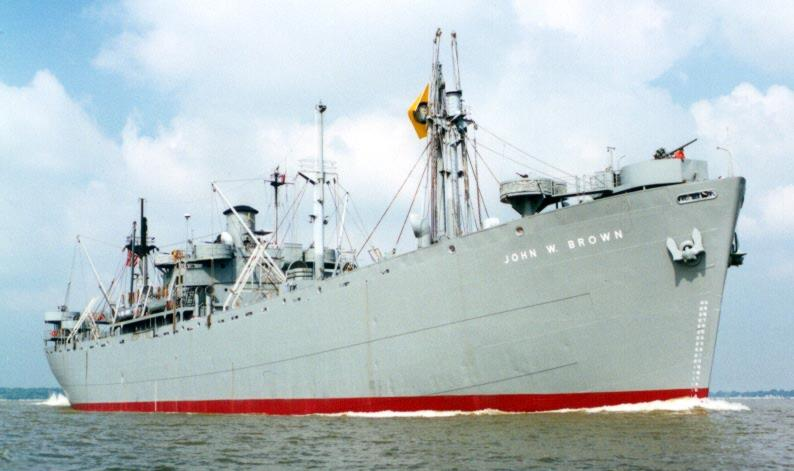
SS John W. Brown on the Great Lakes in 2000

Project Liberty Ship is a non-profit organization in the United States dedicated to the preservation of the Liberty ship SS John W. Brown. Project Liberty Ship began in 1978, when a seminar on Liberty ship preservation was held aboard the John W. Brown, which was then serving as a nautical high school operated by the City of New York. Those attending the seminar could foresee the day, rapidly approaching, when the last ship of that great fleet of over 2700 Liberty Ships would face the breaker's torch or be sunk as an artificial reef, and they were determined to preserve at least one ship as a memorial museum on the east coast of the United States.

With the backing of the National Maritime Historical Society, an organization was formed to work toward the preservation of the John W. Brown. Although there were, at that time, several Liberty Ships that might have been candidates for restoration, the John W. Brown was the logical choice. A small staff of volunteers began planning for the day when New York would close down its floating high school and the ship would become available. A membership drive was commenced and publication of a newsletter, "Liberty Log", was begun.

The ship's career as a schoolship ended in 1982, and the group, now called Project Liberty Ship, was in the midst of a search for a suitable berth in New York Harbor at which to display the John W. Brown. Despite their best efforts, Project Liberty Ship could not locate a single berth in the entire harbor that would accept the ship. They were forced to stand and watch as the John W. Brown was towed out of the harbor and down the coast to the James River, Reserve Fleet in July 1983.

While its membership slowly grew, Project Liberty Ship's volunteer staff continued to search for a berth in New York and accomplished several other important steps. A law was passed in the United States Congress transferring title of the ship from the United States Maritime Administration to Project Liberty Ship. Application was made, and accepted, to list the ship on the National Register of Historic Places. SS John W. Brown became a National Register Ship, one of the very few such ships in the nation.

Finally, late in 1987, Project Liberty Ship officers gave up their attempts to berth John W. Brown in New York and turned to Baltimore, Maryland. In January 1988, a meeting was held at the Baltimore Museum of Industry to discuss the idea. They expected half a dozen people to attend, and they got 40. From the original group who met at the museum a core committee was formed to begin the effort. "Project Liberty Ship Baltimore" went to work, with the full backing and support of the parent group in New York, to permanently display John W. Brown in the harbor of her birth.

== Mission ==
The stated mission of the project is

Project Liberty Ship is a non-profit organization dedicated to the preservation of the Liberty ship SS John W. Brown as a living memorial to the men and women of American industry who built the great Liberty Fleet and to the merchant seamen and Naval Armed Guards who sailed the ships across all the oceans of the world.
