= Johnny Brown (rugby league) =

Australian cricketer and rugby league player

Personal information
- Born: 13 May 1943 (age 83) Mount Morgan, Queensland

Playing information
- Position: Halfback
Club
Years	Team	Pld	T	G	FG	P
	Mount Morgan
	West End (Ipswich)
	Norths (Brisbane)
	Total	0	0	0	0	0
Representative
Years	Team	Pld	T	G	FG	P
1963–71	Queensland	8	1	0	0	3
1970	Australia	1	0	0	0	0

Johnny Brown (born 13 May 1943) is an Australian former rugby league footballer, who played in the 1960s and 1970s. An Australian international and Queensland interstate representative halfback, he played his club football in the Brisbane Rugby League premiership for Norths, with whom he won the 1968 Rothmans Medal and the 1969 premiership.

Having previously played in Mount Morgan and Ipswich, Brown was selected to represent Queensland and moved to the BRL, playing with Norths. In 1967 he was named the club's player of the year and appeared in the grand final loss to Brothers. in 1969 he was again named the Norths club's player of the year, won the Rothmans medal, for best and fairest player in the premiership and also captained the grand-final winning Norths team.

He was selected for Australia in the 1970 World Cup. He also represented Queensland at cricket, appearing in six first-class matches during the 1960s.

== See also ==
- List of cricket and rugby league players
