= Jonathan Brown (English footballer) =

English footballer

Personal information
- Full name: Jonathan Brown
- Date of birth: 1893
- Place of birth: Clayton-le-Moors, England
- Date of death: 6 November 1918 (aged 24–25)
- Place of death: Nord, France
- Position: Left half

Senior career*
Years	Team	Apps	(Gls)
–1913	Great Harwood		
1913–1918	Burnley	1	(0)
- * Club domestic league appearances and goals

Jonathan Brown (1893 – 6 November 1918) was an English professional footballer who made one appearance as a left half in the Football League for Burnley in 1914.

== Military service ==
Brown served as a lance corporal in the East Lancashire Regiment during the First World War and was wounded during the course of his service. He was killed in France on 6 November 1918, just five days before the Armistice. Brown was buried in Maubeuge-Centre Cemetery.

== Career statistics ==
Appearances and goals by club, season and competition
Club	Season	League			FA Cup		Other		Total	
Club	Season	Division	Apps	Goals	Apps	Goals	Apps	Goals	Apps	Goals
Burnley	1914–15	First Division	1	0	0	0	1 (Note: Appearance in Lancashire Senior Cup)	0	2	0
Career total			1	0	0	0	1	0	2	0

== Honours ==
Burnley

- East Lancashire Charity Cup: 1914–15
