= John Lewis Brown =

French painter

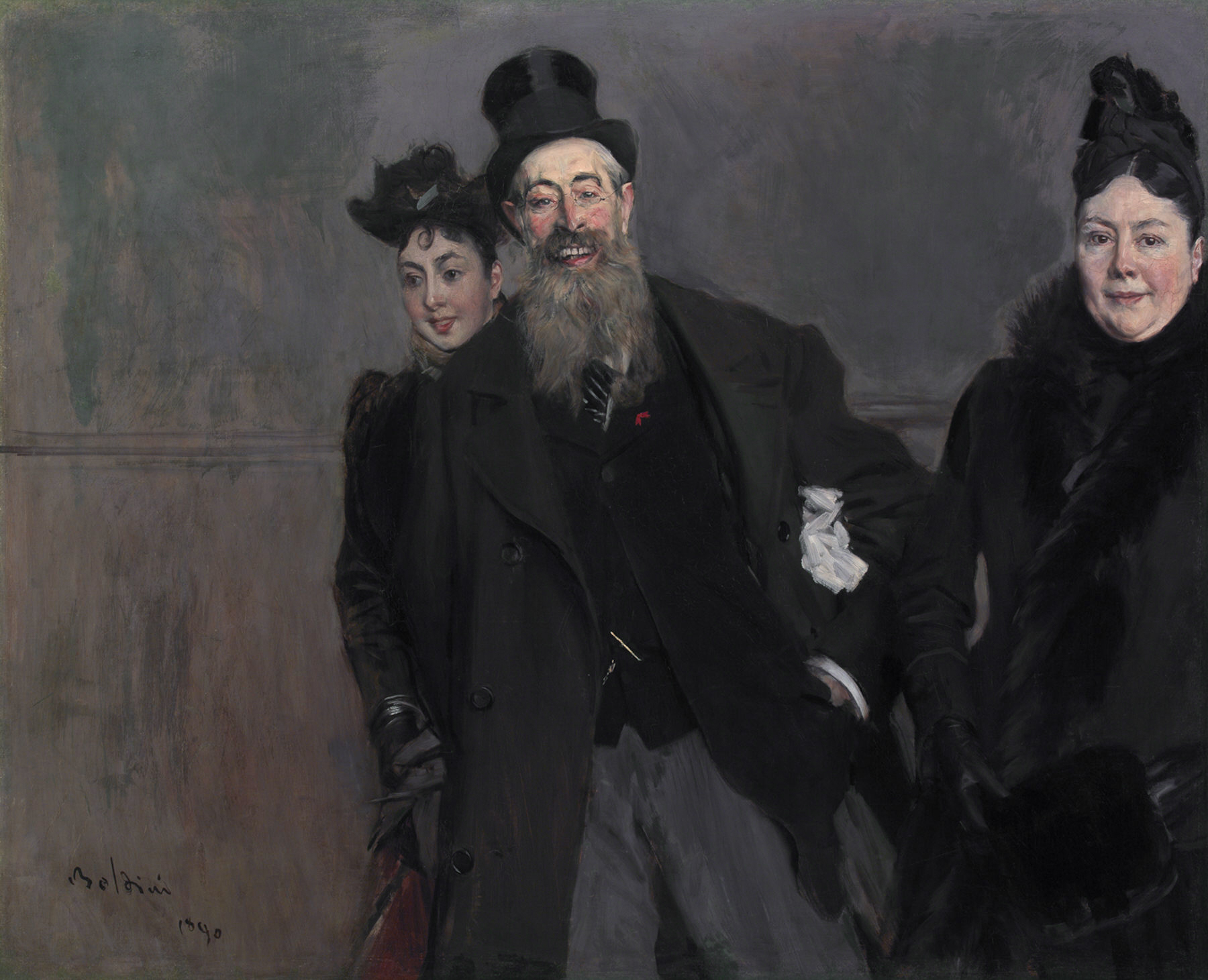
John Lewis Brown with wife and daughter by Giovanni Boldini

John Lewis Brown (1829–1890) was a French battle, animal, and genre painter. He was born in Bordeaux of a Scottish family of Stuart partisans.

== Early life and background ==
Brown's great-grandfather was David Brown, former Governor of Danish India. Brown studied in the École des Beaux-Arts with Camille Roqueplan and Jean-Hilaire Belloc.

== Career ==
Brown is known for his pictures of hunting and military scenes, and his studies of horses and dogs. He painted a number of pictures from the American Revolutionary War, the Seven Years' War, and the Franco-Prussian War of 1870. His presentation is often anecdotal and humorous, his work characterized by refinement and charm. The Luxembourg possesses his "Before the Start," the Gallery of Dublin, "The Mountebank." He was also an etcher and watercolorist.

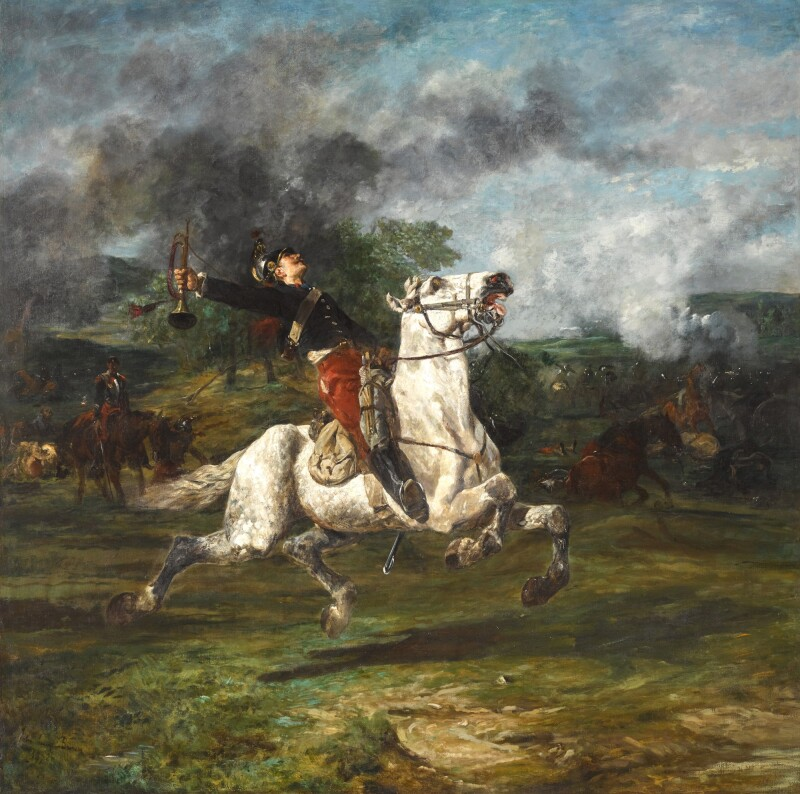
Battle of Reichshoffen

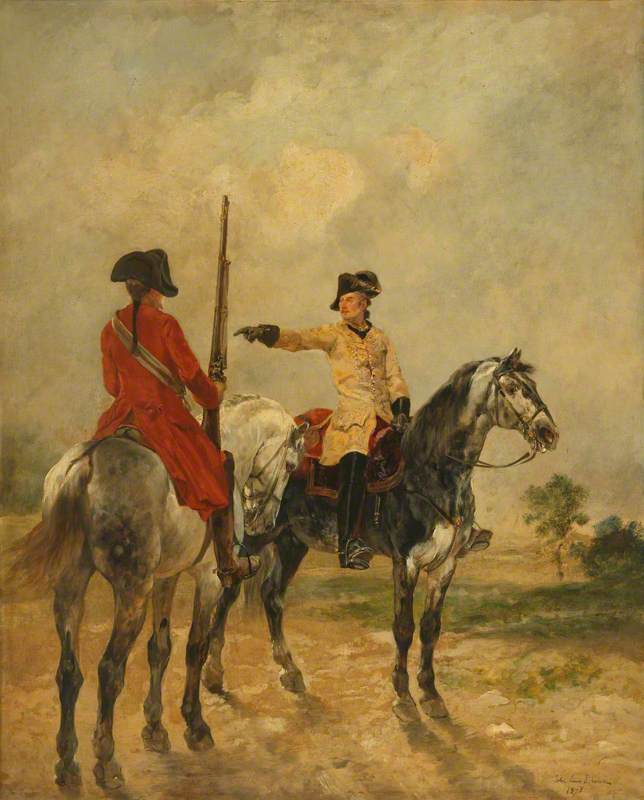
Two Cavalry Officers

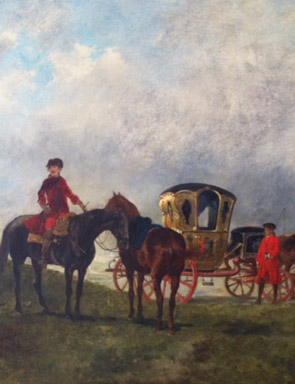
Landscape with figures

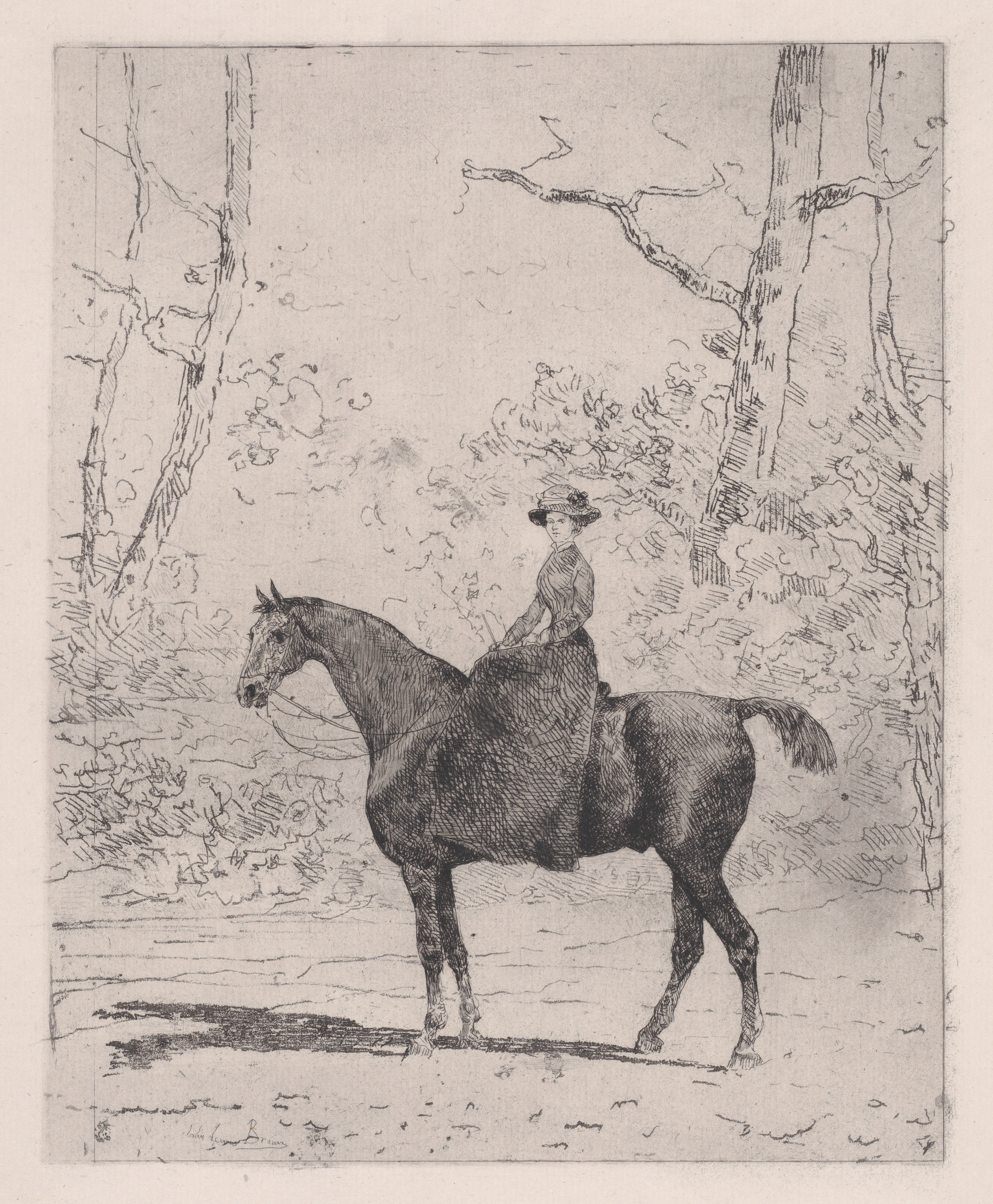
Amazone on horseback

== Publications ==
Notes

Sources

- Bénédite in Revue de l'art ancien et moderne, volume xiii (Paris, 1903)
