= Jon Brown (American football) =

American football player (born 1992)

No. 3, 2, 1
- Position: Placekicker

Personal information
- Born: December 7, 1992 (age 33); Clinton, Mississippi, U.S.
- Listed height: 5 ft 10 in (1.78 m)
- Listed weight: 194 lb (88 kg)

Career information
- College: Kentucky; Louisville
- NFL draft: 2016: undrafted

Career history
- Cincinnati Bengals (2016–2018)*; San Francisco 49ers (2019)*; Jacksonville Jaguars (2020)
- * Offseason or practice squad member only

Career NFL statistics
- Field goals: 1
- Field goal attempts: 2
- Longest field goal: 31
- Stats at Pro Football Reference

Jonathan Brown (born December 7, 1992) is an American former professional football player who was a placekicker in the National Football League (NFL). He played college football for the Louisville Cardinals.

== College career ==
Brown played college football and soccer for Kentucky and Louisville.

== Professional career ==
=== Cincinnati Bengals ===
On May 10, 2016, the Cincinnati Bengals signed Brown as an undrafted free agent. He was then waived by the team on August 30, 2016, and then later re-signed with the team on January 20, 2017. Brown was released by the Bengals again on August 1, 2017, but later was signed to the team's practice squad on December 28, 2017. He signed a reserve/future contract with the Bengals on January 1, 2018. Brown was waived by the Bengals on September 1, 2018.

=== San Francisco 49ers ===
On March 8, 2019, the San Francisco 49ers signed Brown to a two-year contract. He was waived on July 23, 2019.

=== Jacksonville Jaguars ===
On December 31, 2019, he signed a reserve/future contract with the Jaguars. On April 28, 2020, Brown was waived by the Jaguars. He was signed to the team's practice squad on October 9, and promoted to the active roster on October 12. He made his NFL debut on October 18 and made one of two field goal attempts. Those kicks were his first attempted kicks of any type in American football at any level. He was the fifth kicker used by the Jaguars in the season which was an NFL record. He was waived on October 22 and re-signed to the practice squad two days later. He was released on November 23.
