= John S. Brown (Michigan politician) =

American politician

Member of the Michigan House of Representatives from the Hillsdale County district
- In office January 2, 1843 – March 9, 1843

Personal details
- Born: c. 1810 Livingston County, New York
- Party: Democratic

John S. Brown (born c. 1810) was a Michigan politician.

== Early life ==
Brown as born around 1810 in Livingston County, New York. In 1838, Brown moved to Michigan.

== Career ==
Brown was a farmer. On November 7, 1842, Brown was elected to the Michigan House of Representatives where he represented the Hillsdale County district from January 2, 1843 to March 9, 1843. Brown was a Democrat.

== Removal from Michigan ==
In 1845, Brown moved away from Michigan to the American West.
