= John S. Brown (general) =

United States Army general

- Relatives: John E. Sloan (grandfather)
- Military career
- Allegiance: United States of America
- Branch: United States Army
- Service years: 1971–2004
- Rank: Brigadier General
- Commands: B Company, 4-37 Armor; 2nd Battalion, 66th Armor; 2nd Brigade, 1st Cavalry; Chief of Military History, CMH
- Conflicts: Gulf War

John Sloan Brown (born 30 August 1949) is a retired United States Army brigadier general who was the Chief of Military History at the United States Army Center of Military History (CMH) from December 1998 to October 2005.

Born in West Germany to a military family who originally came from Texas, and raised in South Carolina, Brown graduated from the United States Military Academy with a Bachelor of Science degree in 1971. He earned a Master of Arts degree in history from Indiana University in 1977, and then taught history at the U.S. Military Academy from 1981 to 1984 while completing his doctorate in history at Indiana. His 1983 dissertation was entitled Draftee Division: a study of the 88th Infantry Division, first all selective service division into combat in World War II. Brown earned a Master of Military Art and Science degree at the Army Command and General Staff College in 1985 with a thesis entitled Winning Teams: mobilization-related correlates of success in American World War II infantry divisions.

Brown commanded the 2nd Battalion, 66th Armor, in Iraq and Kuwait during the Gulf War and returned to Kuwait as commander of the 2nd Brigade, 1st Cavalry Division, in 1995. He served as Chief Historian and Commander of the United States Army Center of Military History from 1998 to 2005; however, he retired from active duty on 1 August 2004.

== Publications ==
- Draftee Division: The 88th Infantry Division in World War II. Lexington, Kentucky: The University Press of Kentucky. 1986. ISBN 978-0813162263. OCLC 900345134.
- Kevlar Legions: The Transformation of the U. S. Army, 1989-2005. Military Studies Press. 2011. ISBN 978-1780396415.
