= John W. Brown (labor leader) =

American labor leader

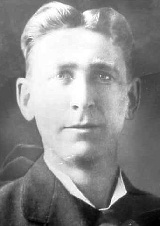
- Born: 1870; Prince Edward Island, Canada
- Died: June 19, 1941 (aged 70–71); Woolwich, Maine, U.S.
- Occupation: Labor leader

John W. Brown (1867 – June 19, 1941) was a Canadian-American labor union leader.

Born on Prince Edward Island in Canada, he moved to Maine and worked as a joiner at the Bath Iron Works, where he became involved with the labor movement. He became an organizer for the United Brotherhood of Carpenters, then went to the United Mine Workers and was involved with the Colorado conflicts of 1913 and 1914, including the Ludlow Massacre.

In 1934 he was living in Woolwich, Maine, where he helped organize Local 4 of the Industrial Union of Marine and Shipbuilding Workers of America, and later served on the union's board. From 1936 on he wrote a regular column for the Shipyard Worker, the union's newspaper. Brown also ran as a Republican Party candidate for the Maine Legislature but never won a seat.

He died at home, from an accidental discharge of his hunting rifle. Liberty ship SS John W. Brown was named after him the following year; the ship has been preserved as a museum.
