= Tony Mazzocchi =

American labor leader (1926-2002)

Anthony Mazzocchi
- Born: June 13, 1926; Brooklyn, New York City, U.S.
- Died: October 5, 2002 (aged 76); Washington, D.C., U.S.
- Occupations: Labor leader Vice-President and Secretary-Treasurer, Oil, Chemical and Atomic Workers International Union
- Spouse(s): Rose Alfonso (divorced); Susan Lynn Kleinwaks (divorced); Katherine Isaac (unmarried partner)
- Children: One son, five daughters

Anthony Mazzocchi (June 13, 1926 – October 5, 2002) was an American labor leader. He was a high elected official of the Oil, Chemical and Atomic Workers International Union (OCAW), serving as vice president from 1977 to 1988, and as secretary-treasurer from 1988 to 1991. He was credited by President Richard Nixon as being the primary force behind enactment of the Occupational Safety and Health Act of 1970.

While serving as OCAW legislative director in the fall of 1974, Mazzocchi mentored Karen Silkwood, a union activist and whistleblower employed in an Oklahoma plutonium production plant who became, in Mazzocchi’s words, a “union martyr”. In the 1990s, he was co-founder of the U.S. Labor Party.

== Early life ==
Anthony Mazzocchi was born in Bensonhurst, Brooklyn, New York, on June 13, 1926, to Joseph and Angelina (Lamardo) Mazzocchi. Both of his parents were Italian immigrants from Naples. His father was a garment worker and union member. The family was very poor, and Mazzocchi slept in the same bed with two of his siblings. His mother died of cancer when Mazzocchi was six years old, and the family lost their home because of the cost of her medical care.

His future politics were shaped at a young age. His two sisters and a closeted gay uncle were members of the Communist Party. In 1949, Mazzocchi supported socialist candidate Vito Marcantonio in his bid to become Mayor of New York City. These early influences and experiences played a major role in forming Mazzocchi's radically progressive political views.

Mazzocchi dropped out of high school in the ninth grade when he was 16 years old. Lying about his age, he enlisted in the United States Army, and fought in Europe during World War II as an anti-aircraft gunner. He saw combat in three major campaigns, most notably the Battle of the Bulge, and helped to liberate Buchenwald concentration camp. Mazzocchi served in the Army from May 1, 1943, to March 3, 1946.

After his discharge in 1946, Mazzocchi got a job as an autoworker for Ford Motor Company in Edgewater, New Jersey. Having read extensively while in the Army, he went back to school and graduated from vocational-technical school while working as a construction worker and steelworker in Brooklyn. In 1950, he took a job at a Helena Rubenstein cosmetics factory in Roslyn, New York, where he became a union organizer.

== Union career ==
In 1953, at the age of 26, Mazzocchi was elected president of the United Gas, Coke, and Chemical Workers' Union (UGCCWU) Local 149, having run on a pledge of equal pay for women. Within a few years, he had not only won equal pay for equal work for women but also negotiated a health insurance plan—one which included the first dental insurance coverage in the private sector in the U.S. During his tenure as president of Local 149, Mazzocchi also led numerous successful organizing drives. He merged several smaller locals into his own and conducted a number of organizing drives, until Local 149 represented workers in 25 companies. He was elected vice-president of the Nassau-Suffolk CIO Council from 1952 to 1955, and (after the merger of the AFL and CIO in 1955) the Long Island Federation of Labor from 1955 to 1973.

Mazzocchi became increasingly influential within UGCCWU. He helped engineer the 1955 merger of UGCCWU with the Oil Workers International Union to form the Oil, Chemical and Atomic Workers International Union. In 1957, he was elected to the International Executive Board of OCAW from District 8. He served until 1965, when he was appointed OCAW's Citizenship-Legislative Director.

=== Passage of OSHA and other political work ===
In the 1960s, Mazzocchi was one of the first labor leaders to begin building strong ties with the environmental movement, an effort which paid off in the passage of major federal worker legislation. In 1962, he read Rachel Carson's book, Silent Spring. Mazzocchi reasoned that if small doses of the chemicals discussed in Silent Spring caused harm, the workers who received large doses in manufacturing plants must be in medical danger.

Mazzocchi used this insight to begin building support in the environmental movement for worker health and safety. He began pushing the labor movement to support environmentalists.

Mazzocchi became a national staffer in 1965. That year, long-time OCAW president O.A. Knight retired. Secretary-Treasurer Alvin F. Grospiron ran for president, and Mazzocchi strongly backed his candidacy. The election was a bitter one. Knight had allowed the Central Intelligence Agency to use the union as a cover for covert operations, and had accepted large sums of money from the agency. Because of his support for Grospiron, Mazzocchi was appointed OCAW's Citizenship-Legislative Director in 1965. He used his position to push strongly for health and safety language in union contracts, as well as for state and federal legislation on the issue.

In 1969 and 1970, he organized a series of public meetings in which OCAW and other union members testified about the chemicals they were handling and the health problems they were having. Scientists also testified about the danger of these chemicals. The public meetings gained widespread press attention. Mazzocchi also used the hearings to help educate workers on the legislative process, and trained them to act as lobbyists for federal health and safety legislation. The media attention and pressure from union members provided critical support for congressional attempts to pass comprehensive occupational health and safety legislation. In December 1970, Congress enacted and President Richard Nixon signed the Occupational Safety and Health Act (OSHA). Nixon specifically cited Mazzocchi's leadership and grassroots organizing efforts as key in winning passage of the Act.

Because of his strong ties to the environmental movement, Mazzocchi was named chair of the first Earth Day rally in New York City on April 22, 1970.

Mazzocchi was also influential in Democratic politics. He campaigned on behalf of Adlai Stevenson in 1956, and became one of Long Island's most politically influential labor leaders. In 1964, Mazzocchi considered running for Congress. But, after being advised by party leaders that he was too radical for the electorate and would endanger the candidacies of other Democrats, he never undertook a campaign.

He did mount a campaign against asbestos hazards in the mid-1960s. Numerous studies had documented the health hazards of long-term exposure to asbestos beginning in the 1930s. After becoming legislative director for OCAW, Mazzocchi began a worker education campaign on the dangers of asbestos in the workplace. Workers with asbestosis, lung cancer, and peritoneal mesothelioma played a prominent role in the occupational health and safety conferences he organized as part of his OSHA campaign.

In 1971, the Occupational Safety and Health Administration promulgated the first national standards for workplace exposure to asbestos. But Mazzocchi believed the OSHA standard was too lenient, and worked to have the National Institute for Occupational Safety and Health conduct additional research into the toxicity of asbestos. In 1976, NIOSH issued a revision of its toxicity assessment for asbestos. But under significant pressure from asbestos manufacturers, OSHA refused to issue a revised standard.

Mazzocchi continued to fight for a new asbestos standard, and in 1986 OSHA issued a temporary revised standard. Mazzocchi's efforts for a stricter standard continued, and in 1992 OSHA issued a final revised standard which cut in half the levels of asbestos exposure permitted under its 1986 rule.

He believed his most profound contribution was linking the scientific and public health communities with workers and unions to create the modern occupational safety and health movement. When speaking during the 1960s about the exposure of hundreds of workers to asbestos in Tyler, Texas, he said:

I wanted the whole country to know in detail what had happened at that factory, and to understand what had gone on there—the fruitless...lack of enforcement by the Department of Labor, the whole long lousy history of neglect, deceit and stupidity—was happening in dozens of other ways, in hundreds of other factories, to thousands of other men across the land. I wanted people to know that thousands upon thousands of their fellow citizens were being assaulted daily, and that the police—in this case, the federal government—had done nothing to remedy the situation. In short I wanted them to know that murder was being committed in the workplace, and that no one was bothering about it.

=== The Silkwood case ===
Mazzocchi became a trusted friend and confidante of Karen Silkwood in the brief time he knew her before her tragic death. She was a technician at a Kerr-McGee nuclear fuel milling, conversion, enrichment, and fuel rod fabrication plant in Crescent, Oklahoma, about 30 miles north of Oklahoma City. Silkwood, a newly elected union representative, came to suspect that Kerr-McGee officials were falsifying records about the integrity of the plant's plutonium nuclear fuel rods. She and two other workers from the Crescent plant met with Mazzocchi in Washington, D.C., the week of September 26, 1974. Although Mazzocchi was preoccupied with his asbestos fight, he spent a day talking to the three workers. They knew almost nothing about the dangers of the radioactive materials they were working with, and Mazzocchi helped educate them about the hazards.

At this meeting, Silkwood confided to Mazzocchi that she believed Kerr-McGee was falsifying some of its quality-control records. Mazzocchi arranged for the three to testify before the Atomic Energy Commission (AEC) regarding safety failures at the Crescent plant. Mazzocchi also outlined a two-point plan for the workers to follow. First, they would pursue the safety lapses with the AEC. Second, and more importantly, Mazzocchi asked Silkwood to collect more information about the quality-control problems. She was not to take any documents, but was to take notes on documents, record what she observed, and begin building a case. Mazzocchi believed that by leaking information to the press and following up with public testimony, he could create the same outcry for change that had proven so successful in the OSHA campaign. When Silkwood discovered in early November that she had been contaminated with dangerous levels of plutonium, Mazzocchi feared that Kerr-McGee might pinpoint her as the source of the information OCAW intended to leak to The New York Times.

Karen Silkwood died in a car accident on November 13, 1974 while on her way to deliver evidence to New York Times reporter David Burnham about the safety violations at the Crescent plant. The evidence she had collected was missing from her car at the crash site. Alerted to suspicious aspects of the accident, Mazzocchi permitted the use of OCAW funds to hire a former police officer-turned-private investigator to examine the accident scene and Silkwood's car. After the investigator found indications that her car may have been forced off the road and that she was awake when the crash occurred (rather than asleep at the wheel as Oklahoma state police had concluded), Mazzocchi asked U.S. Attorney General William B. Saxbe on November 19, 1974 to investigate Silkwood's death. Mazzocchi also released a statement to the press, prematurely as it turned out: The private investigator's report had not yet been written, and the press release exposed the investigator to harassment and press misreporting which severely muddled OCAW's case that Silkwood may have been murdered. When the AEC concluded that she had not been contaminated accidentally, Mazzocchi was pleased with the result. He was not pleased when the AEC refused any attempt to try to determine how she had been poisoned with plutonium. The Attorney General closed the investigation into Silkwood's death on April 30, 1975, saying there was no evidence of foul play.

Mazzocchi assisted other workers who had been retaliated against for speaking out against safety and health violations at the Kerr-McGee plant. When two OCAW members who had helped Silkwood were fired on what Mazzocchi felt were trumped-up charges of drug abuse, he filed charges with the AEC and the National Labor Relations Board (NLRB), accusing Kerr-McGee of violating federal law. An arbitrator reinstated one worker with back pay. The AEC sent its complaint to the Federal Bureau of Investigation (FBI), as retaliation against a whistleblower is a criminal violation of federal law. The FBI referred the matter to the Attorney General, and the complaint was never acted on. The NLRB issued a complaint against Kerr-McGee for violating the National Labor Relations Act, but never sought court enforcement of its order. The NLRB referred its charges to the Attorney General for prosecution, but no action was taken.

Although Mazzocchi continued to fight for worker health and safety issues at Kerr-McGee, he was compelled in 1975 to cease any further investigations into Silkwood's death. Union members began to fear that the AEC or the company might close the plant, and Mazzocchi was forced to weigh the livelihoods of hundreds of members against any additional investigation.

=== Later career ===
Mazzocchi's efforts on health and safety boosted his political popularity within the union. In 1977, he defeated the incumbent Elwood Swisher to become vice president of OCAW. Encouraged by supporters, he ran for president of the union in 1979 when Alvin F. Grospiron retired. He lost to Robert Goss by 1 percent of the vote. He challenged Goss for the presidency again in 1981. But the disaffiliation of most of OCAW's Canadian membership and the breakup of the environmental-union coalition over the issue of job protections led to a second defeat (again by less than 1 percent of the vote). Some accused Goss, who had strong ties to the CIA, of dirty tricks during the election. Others pointed out that many OCAW members were unhappy with Mazzocchi's views on nuclear disarmament and the environment.

Estranged from the OCAW leadership, Mazzocchi spent much of the early 1980s agitating for more aggressive organizing and stronger stands on occupational health and safety. He was an important figure in the "right to know" movement, which advocated for rules, regulations and legislation to give individuals the right to know which chemicals they may be exposed to while on the job. He drew national attention to industry efforts to force women who worked with toxic chemical to undergo sterilization. Ms. magazine named him one of the "40 Male Heroes of the Decade" in 1982 for his work against company-sponsored sterilization.

Goss retired in 1988, and was succeeded by Robert Wages. Mazzocchi had reconciled with Wages in the mid-1980s, who asked Mazzocchi to be his running mate. Elected OCAW's Secretary-Treasurer in 1988, Mazzocchi served in that position until his retirement in 1991. From 1991 to 1999, he served as "special assistant to the president" on legislative, civil rights, health and safety matters.

In 1991, Mazzocchi established Alice Hamilton College, an alternative school for union members. It is named for Dr. Alice Hamilton, a pioneer in occupational health. In 2001, Mazzocchi founded the Labor Film Festival at the John F. Kennedy Center for the Performing Arts.

== Founding the Labor Party ==
Mazzocchi founded the Labor Party in Cleveland, Ohio in 1996. For several decades, Mazzocchi had been convinced that corporations and entrenched business interests, as embodied in America’s two main political parties, were not serving the best interests of working people. Throughout the 1980s, Mazzocchi ran an organization known as the Labor Party Advocates, a group of individuals committed to the goal of organizing a new political party to support national health care, Social Security, labor rights and other workers' issues. He had won the support of nine international unions and hundreds of local unions and central labor councils. Their membership totaled more than a million workers.

== Role in peace movement ==
Mazzocchi had a strong interest in the peace movement. He concluded that poor workplace health and safety was, in essence, violence against workers. This led him to become active in the broader peace movement as a way of combating other forms of violence against workers. In 1957, Mazzocchi helped launched the Committee for a Sane Nuclear Policy (SANE), an anti-nuclear weapons testing organization. His activities in SANE won him a meeting in 1964 with President Lyndon B. Johnson to discuss converting military production facilities to civilian use. In 1972, when most American labor leaders strongly supported the Vietnam War, Mazzocchi founded Labor for Peace, a group of 22 labor leaders from 13 unions dedicated to ending the war.

== Marriage and family ==
Mazzocchi was married twice. His marriages to Rose Alfonso and Susan Lynn Kleinwaks ended in divorce. He had one son and five daughters. In his later years, Mazzocchi lived with Katherine Isaac at his home in Washington, D.C.

== Death ==
Mazzocchi was diagnosed with pancreatic cancer in the spring of 2002. He died of the disease at his home in Washington, D.C., on October 5, 2002.

== Legacy and honors ==
After several mergers, OCAW became part of the United Steelworkers of America. The Steelworkers' Tony Mazzocchi Center for Health, Safety and Environmental Education in Pittsburgh, Pennsylvania, was dedicated to him. The Tony Mazzocchi Archive, housed at the Rutgers Labor Center, opened in June 2026.
