= Fur Workers Industrial Union =

Former trade union of the United States

The Fur Workers Industrial Union was an industrial labor union of fur trade workers in the United States. The Fur Workers Industrial Union was affiliated with the Needle Trades Workers Industrial Union, which in turn was affiliated to the Trade Union Unity League (TUUL). Ben Gold was the president of the Fur Workers Industrial Union.

== Organizational history ==
The Fur Workers Industrial Union was formed in 1927 by a group of New York City locals expelled from the American Federation of Labor-affiliated International Fur Workers Union of the United States and Canada. The split had been preceded by a power struggle inside the fur workers union locals of New York. Under the leadership of Gold, communists had taken over the control of a number of fur workers locals in New York. They had nearly been able to seize control over the union as such during the 1925 convention. Following a 1926 strike led by Gold, locals in Chicago, Philadelphia, Newark and Boston also swayed to the communist side. In January 1927, foreseeing a communist victory at the 1927 union convention, the communist leaders and locals were expelled on the instructions of the AFL president William Green.

The relations between the Fur Workers Industrial Union and the International Fur Workers Union of the United States and Canada were very bad. Violent clashes often broke out between the two unions at picket lines, at workplaces or in the streets of the city. Apart from its presence in New York, the union also established a stronghold in Chicago.

In 1935 the Fur Workers Industrial Union merged back into the International Fur Workers Union of the United States and Canada. The merger was preceded by a meeting in Toronto, Ontario, Canada at which the left and right wings of the fur workers movement reconciled and opted for a united front. A mass meeting of 5,000 members of the International Fur Workers Union of the United States and Canada was held in New York in June 1935, defying the AFL president Green by voting to continue merger efforts with the dissident union. According to media reports, Gold received a 15-minute standing ovation when entering the meeting hall.

== See also ==
- International Fur & Leather Workers Union
- The Fur Worker
