= International Federation of Petroleum and Chemical Workers =

Former global union federation (1954–1976)

The International Federation of Petroleum and Chemical Workers (IFPCW) was a global union federation bringing together trade union representing workers in the chemical and oil industries.

== History ==
The secretariat was established in 1954 at a meeting in Paris, held on the initiative of the International Confederation of Free Trade Unions (ICFTU) and the Oil Workers' International Union of the United States. It was formed in response to the growth of employment in the oil industry, and was initially named the International Federation of Petroleum Workers. Most of its founder members had previously been affiliated to the International Federation of Industrial Organisations and General Workers' Unions (IFF).

The secretariat was based in Denver, and was the only global union federation to have headquarters outside Europe. By 1960, it had 43 affiliates, with a membership of more than 500,000. In 1963, the union began recruiting unions of chemical workers, and renamed itself as the "International Federation of Petroleum and Chemical Workers". This brought it into conflict with the IFF, which renamed itself as the "International Federation of Chemical and General Workers' Unions" (ICF), and the ICFTU suspended grants to both organisations.

By the late 1960s, it became known that the IFPCW was receiving regular grants from CIA funds, and it became regarded as a CIA front organisation. Faced with a loss of prestige, it discussed a potential merger with the ICF, but this did not occur, and it dissolved in 1976.

== Affiliates ==
In 1960, the following unions were affiliated to the federation:

Union	Country	Affiliated membership
Autonomous Union of Italian Petroleum Workers	Italy	Unknown
Bengal Oil and Petrol Workers' Union	India	Unknown
Cartel of Unions of Research and Development Engineers in Hydrocarbons	France	Unknown
Central Islamic Labour Union of Indonesia	Indonesia	Unknown
Chemical, Paper and Ceramic Union	West Germany	10,000
Consolidated Mobil Oil Workers' Union of Nigeria and Cameroons	Nigeria	Unknown
Federation of Petroleum and Related Industries' Workers of Peru	Peru	1,000
Hind Oil Kamger Sabha	India	600
Histadrut	Israel	2,400
Gambia Workers' Union	Gambia	Unknown
General Union of Petroleum Workers	Tunisia	Unknown
General Union of Petroleum Workers	United Arab Republic	20,000
General Union of Miscellaneous Industries	Netherlands	1,400
Kenya Chemical Workers' Union	Kenya	Unknown
Kenya Petroleum and Oil Workers' Union	Kenya	2,500
Lebanese Petroleum Company Employees' and Workers' Union	Lebanon	75
Madras Kerosene Oil Workers' Union	India	Unknown
Mobil Oil Company Employees' Union	Lebanon	140
Mobil Oil Workers' Union	Lebanon	140
National Federation of Engineers and Supervisory Employees	France	300
National Federation of Miners	France	600
National Federation of Petroleum and Products Workers	Cuba	10,919
National Federation of Workers in Commercial Distribution Companies of Mining Products and Combustible Materials	Brazil	40,000
National Federation of Workers in the Chemical, Parachemical and Glass Industries	France	4,000
Oil, Chemical and Atomic Workers International Union	Canada	10,000
Oil, Chemical and Atomic Workers International Union	United States	200,000
Oil Companies' Field Staff Association	India	150
Oilfield Workers' Federation	British West Indies Federation	12,000
Pakistan Petroleum Workers' Federation	Pakistan	12,000
Panhellenic Federation of Petroleum Workers and Employees	Greece	5,000
Petroleum Employees' Union	India	800
Petroleum Employees' Union of Ceylon	Ceylon	Unknown
Petroleum Workers' Federation of Aruba	Netherlands Antilles	3,000
Petroleum Workers' Federation of Curaçao	Netherlands Antilles	6,200
Petroleum Workers' Trade Union	Libya	Unknown
Singapore Petroleum Workers' Union	Singapore	989
Swiss Textile and Factory Workers' Union	Switzerland	Unknown
Turkish Petroleum Workers' Union	Turkey	6,000
Union of Metal, Mining and Energy	Austria	Unknown
Union of Oil and Methane Gas Workers	Italy	8,795
Union of Oil and Petroleum Workers	Ghana	2,200
Union of Organised Petroleum Workers	Venezuela	1,300
Union of Petroleum Workers of Colombia	Colombia	20,000

== Leadership ==
=== General Secretaries ===
1954: Loyd A. Haskins
1973: Curtis Hogan

=== Presidents ===
1954: Jack Knight
1967: Luis Tovar
1973: George Sacre
