= Luis Tovar =

Luis Tovar Ravelo (11 June 1908 – 4 August 1974) was a Venezuelan labor unionist and politician.

Born in Caracas, Tovar began working at the age of 14. In 1925, he obtained a driver's licence, becoming a professional driver. In 1927, he joined the Drivers' Mutual Aid Society of the Federal District, and became its president the same year. In 1928, he supported a strike of tram workers in the city, for which he was imprisoned.

In 1936, Tovar joined the political party which later became Democratic Action. During this period, he served as head of the city's traffic inspectorate. In 1940, he instead became a driver for Samuel E. Niño, president of Aragua, then moved to work for Standard Oil, as a driver based at the refinery in Caripito. He led the formation of the Caripito Oil Workers Union, and became its founding president, which led in 1941 to his sacking. Over the next few years, he founded unions of oil workers across eastern Venezuela.

In 1944, Tovar was a founding member of the Union of Workers of Venezuela, becoming its Secretary of Culture and Propaganda. The union was dissolved by the government the following year, but Tovar negotiated an agreement between oil workers and their employers. In 1946, he founded the Federation of Oil Workers of Venezuela (Fedepetrol), becoming its first president.

Tovar was elected to represent Guárico in the 1947 Venezuelan general election. That year, he was a founder of the Confederación de Trabajadores de Venezuela federation. Fedepetrol was dissolved by the government in 1948, and when, in 1950, Tovar organized a strike, he was imprisoned. After his release, he worked secretly as national labour secretary of Democratic Action, but he was again imprisoned in 1956. Freed two years later, he re-established Fedepetrol and was re-elected as its president. In the 1958 Venezuelan general election, he was elected in Monagas.

In 1967, Tovar was elected as president of the International Federation of Petroleum and Chemical Workers, the first person from Latin America to lead an international trade secretariat. He held various leading positions in Democratic Action. His opposition to Luis Beltrán Prieto Figueroa led in 1969 to his replacement as leader of Fedepetrol, becoming honorary life president. He left parliament in 1973, and died the following year.

Trade union offices
Preceded by Union founded	President of the Federation of Oil Workers of Venezuela; 1946–1969	Succeeded by Carlos Piñerúa
Preceded by Jack Knight	President of the International Federation of Petroleum and Chemical Workers; 1967–1973	Succeeded by George Sacre
