= Robert F. Goss =

American labor union leader (1921-2005)

Robert Francis Goss (November 10, 1921 – October 27, 2005) was an American labor union leader.

Born in Escanaba, Michigan, Goss grew up in Lomita, California. In 1940, he began working for Union Oil, and joined the Oil Workers' International Union. In 1949, he began working full-time for his local union. In 1957, he began working for the international union, which had become the Oil, Chemical and Atomic Workers' International Union (OCAW).

In 1963, Goss moved to become assistant general secretary of the ICFTU Inter American Regional Organisation of Workers. He returned to OCAW in 1965, and in 1967 was appointed as administrative assistant to its president. He was elected as the vice-president of OCAW in 1975, and in 1977 was also elected as a vice-president of the AFL-CIO. In 1979, he defeated Anthony Mazzocchi to become president of OCAW.

As leader of the union, he negotiated a merger with the United Paperworkers' International Union, but unexpectedly called it off before completion. He retired from the union in 1983, and from the AFL-CIO in 1985. In 1987, he was appointed as head of the Colorado Department of Labor.

He died in 2005 in Rifle, Colorado, aged 83. His widow, Frances King Goss, died four days later. They had a son, Bradley, and daughter, Nancy.

Trade union offices
Preceded by Alvin Grospiron	President of the Oil, Chemical, and Atomic Workers International Union; 1979–1983	Succeeded by Joseph Misbrener
