= International Fur & Leather Workers Union =

Former trade union of the United States

IFLWU
- International Fur & Leather Workers Union
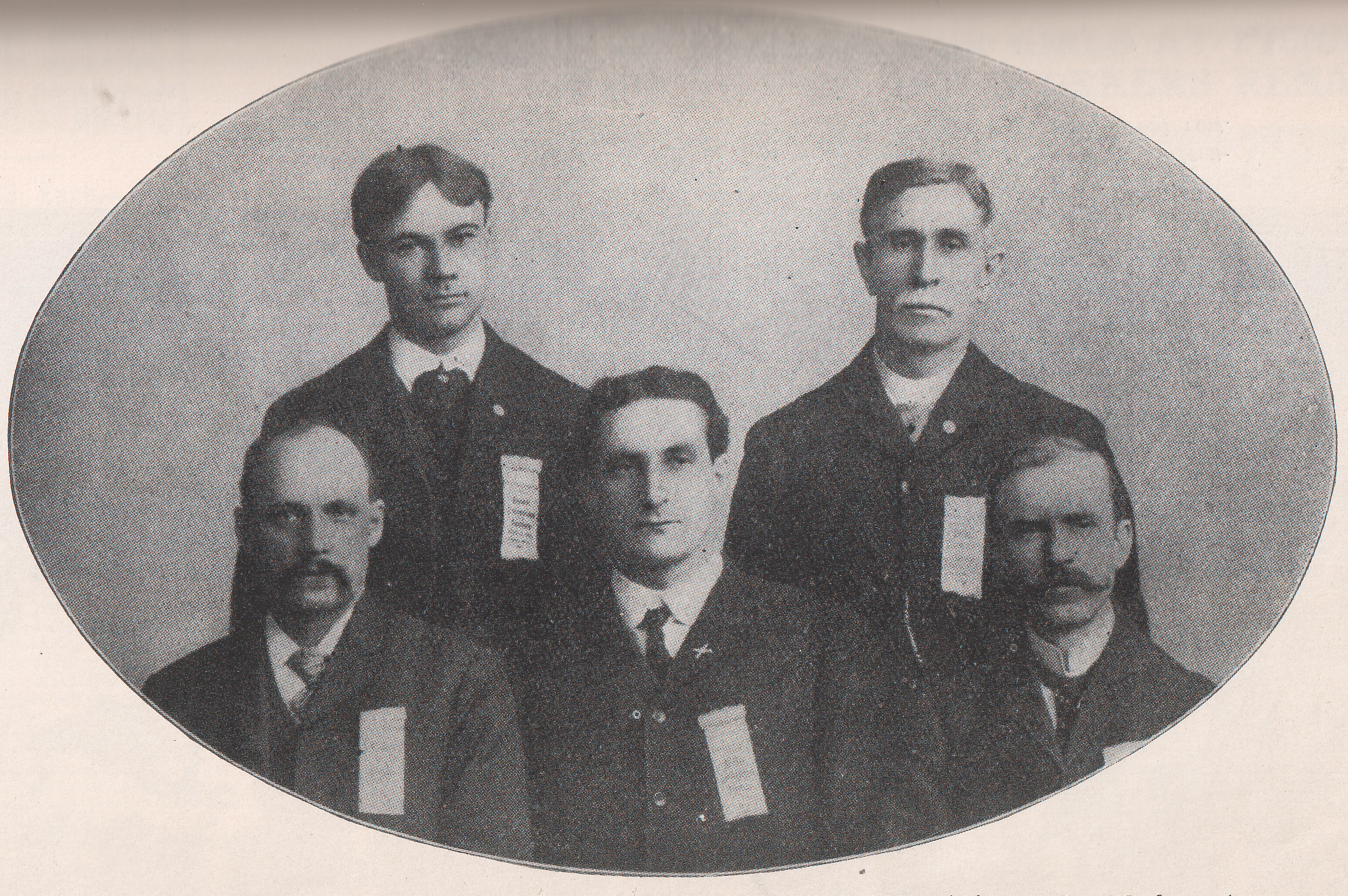
- Founders of the International Association of Fur Workers of the United States and Canada
- Union merger: Amalgamated Meat Cutters (United Food and Commercial Workers)
- Founded: 1913
- Dissolved: 1955
- Headquarters: New York City
- Location: United States
- Key people: Ben Gold, President
- Affiliations: AFL, CIO, expelled for communist ties

The International Fur and Leather Workers Union (IFLWU), was a labor union that represented workers in the fur and leather trades.

== History ==
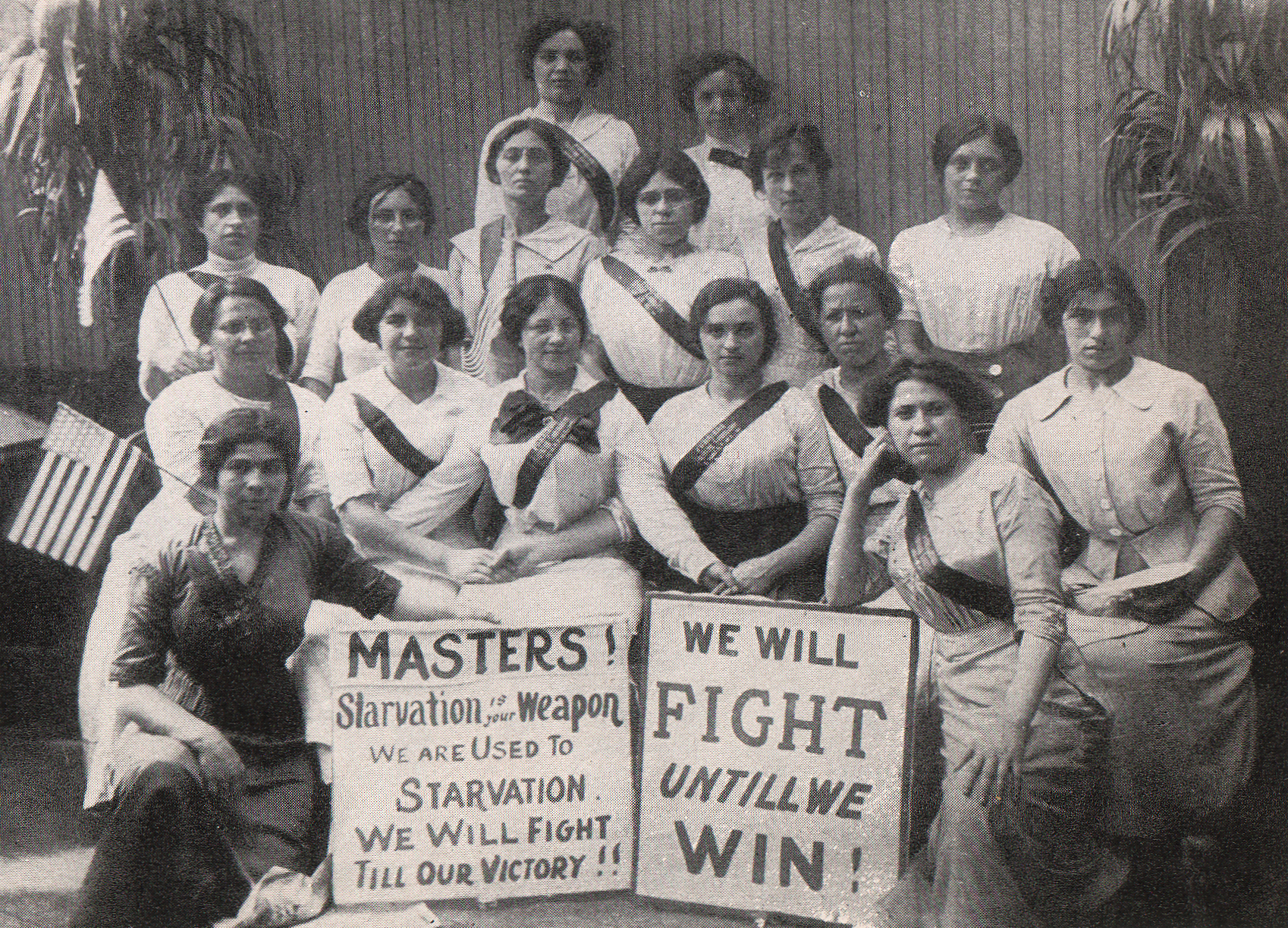
"Group of striking fur girls at picnic: Shops reopen, but workers remain out" (1912)

The IFLWU was founded in 1913 and affiliated with the American Federation of Labor (AFL).

Radical union organizers, including Communists, played a role in the union from its early years. It became one of the major bases in the labor movement. Irving Howe says that the Communists used "Shock troops, a sort of paramilitary vanguard handy with knives, belts, pikes."

The most active radical and long-time Communist Ben Gold, was president from 1935 until he was forced out by moderates in the 1940s.

In 1937, the IFLWU left the AFL and joined the new Congress of Industrial Organizations (CIO), led by John L. Lewis.

In 1948, former CIO general counsel Lee Pressman joined Joseph Forer, a Washington-based attorney, in representing Irving Potash, vice president of the Fur and Leather Workers Union along with four others (Gerhard Eisler, supposedly the top Soviet agent in America; Ferdinand C. Smith, secretary of the National Maritime Union; Charles A. Doyle of the Gas, Coke and Chemical Workers Union, and John Williamson, labor secretary of the Communist Party USA). On May 5, 1948, Pressman and Forer received a preliminary injunction so their defendants might have hearings with examiners unconnected with the investigations and prosecutions by examiners of the Immigration and Naturalization Service.

Between 1949 and 1950, with Cold War tensions rising, the CIO expelled the IFLWU and 10 other unions that it accused of being "communist dominated."

In 1955, the union merged into the Amalgamated Meat Cutters and Butcher Workmen of North America union.

== Presidents ==
1913: A. Miller
1923: Morris Kaufman
1927: Philip Silberstein
1937: Ben Gold

== See also ==
- Fur Workers Industrial Union
- The Fur Worker
- Amalgamated Meat Cutters
- Henry Foner
- Lee Pressman
- Nathan Witt
- Max Federman
