= Oil, Chemical and Atomic Workers International Union =

North American trade union (1917–1999)

- Abbreviation: OCAW
- Merged into: Paper, Allied-Industrial, Chemical and Energy Workers International Union
- Formation: 1955
- Dissolved: January 4, 1999
- Merger of: Oil Workers International Union; United Gas Coke and Chemical Workers of America
- Type: Trade union
- Locations: United States; Canada (until 1980)
- Members: 80,000
- Presidents: Jack Knight; Alvin F. Grospiron; Robert Goss; Joseph Misbrener; Robert Wages
- Secessions: Energy and Chemical Workers Union
- Affiliations: AFL–CIO

The Oil, Chemical and Atomic Workers Union (OCAW) was a trade union in the United States which existed between 1917 and 1999. At the time of its dissolution and merger, the International represented 80,000 workers and was affiliated with the AFL–CIO.

== History ==
=== Oil Workers International (OWIU) ===
The union was first originally established as the International Association of Oil Field, Gas Well, and Refinery Workers of America in 1918 after a major workers' strike in the Texas oil fields in late 1917. It affiliated with the American Federation of Labor (AFL) when they granted the occurrence of local unions of oil workers at a convention held in El Paso, Texas, and officially set up the international union for oil workers in 1918. Beginning with only 25 members, the newly established union underwent much success in the first few years of establishment. In just a few years they were already organizing and negotiating well thought out contacts that would affect thousands of oil workers in only three states California, Texas, and Oklahoma.

Its membership grew to 30,000 as the oil industry grew rapidly in the United States in 1921, which was considered their first high peak but the Great Depression reduced its ranks to just 350 in the beginning of 1933. With the several local unions that had been established, only one local – LB local 128 – managed to not miss a single meeting. The union began to increase in size and activity again once the NRA was passed in 1933. The NRA, under the New Deal, guaranteed the right of workers to organize. At the end of 1933, and even through the depression, several thousands of oil workers joined and rejoined the union and dispersed into several dozen locals. At this point being a part of the union became really important for the oil industry.

In 1937, the union changed its name to the Oil Workers International Union (OWIU). The union was one of the first that affiliated with the Committee for Industrial Organization in early 1938, and AFL President William Green revoked the union's AFL charter.

CIO helped the union grow significantly between the years of 1940–1946. Memberships grew due to large strategic groups that were brought into the union, but soon after growth began to slowly decrease after 1946.

Due to the expanding in memberships and in the union itself, the OWIU extended its membership into Canada in 1948. They expanded into Canada so that they could improve wages and working conditions. After 1948, due to wages and working conditions being outrageous, Canadian workers reaped the benefits of these changes from the union and soon after started to receive wages close behind those in the US. The impressive movement even far surpassed wages of other industries in Canada as well.

=== United Gas Coke and Chemical Workers of America (UGCCWA) ===
Similar to that of the OWIU, the UGCCWA began as the United Mine Workers of America. The main purpose of the UMA was to unite workers in industries related to coke and artificial gas production, which used coke as a fuel.

Due to being unhappy with the service AFL was providing them, UMW eventually broke away from the AFL and they decided to create its own union separate from that of AFL called “District 50”. District 50 became a branch of UMW and its main purpose was to cover “gas, coke and chemical products” made from coal.

Eventually, the president, John L Lewis, of UMW and of CIO resigned as president of the CIO and therefore removing UMW out of the CIO as well. After they were no longer part of AFL and CIO, Lewis strengthened District 50. He made it transform into a sort of all of the above branch of the Mine Workers, in such that all miscellaneous groups related to that of gas, coke, and chemicals were now a part of District 50 making gas, coke, and chemical workers simply a small division of District 50.

Due to the impact that this action had on the workers of these companies, several of the division leaders from District 50 met with the CIO executive board in June 1942. They wanted to break away from District 20 and unite back into CIO so they wanted to discuss the chance of creating an international union for their industry alone. The UGCCWU had broken away from the United Mine Workers of America in September 1942, and won a charter from the Congress of Industrial Organizations (CIO). At the time they were finally granted charter, their union officially changed their name to United Gas Coke and Chemical Workers of America.

The international under the CIO got off to a slow beginning and the first meeting only represented around 5,000 workers. However, in just a few months the union grew in size when numerous other groups left District 50 and joined the UGCCWA.

In 1948, Lee Pressman of New York and Joseph Forer of Washington, DC, represented Charles A. Doyle of the Gas, Coke and Chemical Workers Union along with Gerhard Eisler (public thought to be the top Soviet spy in America); Irving Potash, vice president of the Fur and Leather Workers Union; Ferdinand C. Smith, secretary of the National Maritime Union; and John Williamson, labor secretary of the CPUSA). On May 5, 1946, Pressman and Forer received a preliminary injunction so their defendants might have hearings with examiners unconnected with the investigations and prosecutions by examiners of the Immigration and Naturalization Service.

Over the next several years, members slowly but steadily increased but finally hit their peak in 1950 when members quickly grew. Finally, when UGCCWA merged with OWIU almost 100,000 workers represented those in the gas, coke, and chemical industry.

=== Oil Chemical and Atomic Workers International Union (OCAW) ===
Oil Workers International Union (OWIU) and the United Gas, Coke, and Chemical Workers of America (UGCCWA) merged on March 4, 1955, to form the Oil, Chemical, and Atomic Workers Union (OCAW). When the AFL and CIO merged in 1955, so did the two oil workers' unions. In 1956, after only one year of the merge, OCAW represented approximately 210,000 workers. During this time, it represented more workers than any other union in the oil and chemical field.

The OCAW had one important objective and main focus of their union, the improvement of living conditions of those who work in oil, chemical and related industries. OCAW went about achieving this by collective bargaining and participating in community activities, political action, and educational work. Collective bargaining was focused on seeking better wages and better working conditions for the wage earned. The union, in a specific rule followed way, bargained with employers on how to improve these conditions. Also, by participating in community activities, political action, and educational work, the union intended on gaining experience first hand and developing ways to better government, schools, housing, recreational facilities, amongst other things that will help improve the community in entirety.

In the 1970s, OCAW's Canadian locals broke off to form their own union. OCAW tried to absorb the United Rubber Workers several times in the 1970s and 1980s, but the talks collapsed due to internal union politics within the Rubber Workers and no merger ever occurred.

OCAW lost approximately 50 percent of its membership between 1980 and 1995, primarily because oil companies closed nearly half the refineries in the US. OCAW sought a merger with larger unions in an attempt to survive. A planned merger with the United Mine Workers of America was rejected on February 24, 1988, just two hours before the unions planned to announce the merger agreement. OCAW finally merged with the 250,000-member United Paperworkers International Union on January 4, 1999, to form the Paper, Allied-Industrial, Chemical and Energy Workers International Union (PACE).

OCAW gained a final victory as an independent union seven months after the merger, when the federal government acknowledged for the first time that nuclear weapons production during the Cold War likely caused the illness and even deaths of thousands of atomic mining, refining, and production workers. The government agreed to seek legislation to compensate workers and their survivors for their medical care and lost wages. The admission of complicity and legislative relief had long been sought by OCAW.

PACE merged with the United Steelworkers in 2005 to form the United Steel, Paper and Forestry, Rubber, Manufacturing, Energy, Allied-Industrial and Service Workers International Union (although the merged union is still more commonly known as the United Steelworkers). OCAW members are scattered throughout several "bargaining conferences", the industry divisions internal to the United Steelworkers. These include the Chemical Industry, Energy and Utilities, Manufacturing, Mining, and Pharmacies and Pharmaceuticals conferences. Robert Wages, president of OCAW from 1991 to 1999, is currently retired. Kip Phillips a former Vice President is now a Vice President at large with the USW.

== Presidents ==
1955: Jack Knight
1965: Alvin F. Grospiron
1979: Robert F. Goss
1983: Joseph Misbrener
1991: Bob Wages

== Other notable members ==
- Stanley Aronowitz
- Tony Mazzocchi
- Mike Ricigliano
- Sam Nahem (1915–2004), Major League Baseball pitcher
- Karen Silkwood
- Sylvia Krekel Kieding
- Leo I Crema
