= Jack Knight (unionist) =

American labor unionist (1902-1981)

Orie Albert "Jack" Knight (September 24, 1902 – April 16, 1981) was an American labor unionist.

Born in New Hampton, Iowa, Knight worked in highway construction before moving to East Chicago, Indiana, to work for Shell Oil. He rose to become a stillman, and joined what became the Oil Workers' International Union. In 1933, he helped the union establish itself in Hammond, Indiana, and he then began working full-time as a union organizer, mostly in California.

In 1940, Knight was elected as president of the union, and under his leadership, its membership grew steadily. The union was affiliated to the Congress of Industrial Organizations (CIO), and in 1947, he was elected as a vice-president of the CIO. He represented the CIO in the unity negotiations which produced the AFL–CIO in 1955, becoming one of its vice-presidents, and also chair of its Interamerican Affairs Committee. At the same time, he merged the union into the new Oil, Chemical, and Atomic Workers International Union (OCAW), becoming the president of the largest oil or chemical workers' union in the world.

In 1954, Knight became the founding president of the International Federation of Petroleum Workers. The only international trade secretariat based outside Europe, under his presidency, it began accepting unions of chemical workers, and expanded its membership to cover more than 500,000 workers.

Knight retired as president of OCAW in 1965, and from his international role two years later. By this time, it had become known that the international was receiving regular grants from CIA funds, and it became regarded as a CIA front organization. He died in 1981.

Trade union offices
Preceded by Harvey C. Fremming	President of the Oil Workers' International Union; 1940–1955	Succeeded by Union merged
Preceded by New position	President of the Oil, Chemical, and Atomic Workers International Union; 1955–1965	Succeeded by Alvin F. Grospiron
Preceded by New position	President of the International Federation of Petroleum Workers; 1954–1967	Succeeded by Luis Tovar
Preceded by Karl Feller; George McGregor Harrison	AFL-CIO delegate to the Trades Union Congress; 1962; With: John M. Elliott	Succeeded by Anthony J. DeAndrade; William J. Farson
