= The Fur Worker =

US magazine

- Editor: Aaron Rosebury (1917–1921, 1923–1930); Morris Kaufman (1920s)
- Frequency: Fortnightly
- Circulation: 12,000 (1925)
- Publisher: International Fur Workers' Union of the United States and Canada
- Country: United States
- Language: English, Yiddish

The Fur Worker was a fortnightly labor journal published by the International Fur Workers' Union of the United States and Canada from Long Island, New York, the United States. The magazine was issued from 1916 to 1931 and again from 1937 to 1939.

== Publication history ==
The Fur Worker was the organ of the International Fur Workers' Union of the United States and Canada. It was established in 1916. Issues of The Fur Worker consisted of 8-12 pages, and carried articles in English and Yiddish. Aaron Rosebury was the editor of The Fur Worker 1917–1921, and again during 1923–1930. Morris Kaufman was another editor of The Fur Worker during the 1920s.

As of 1925, The Fur Worker had a circulation of around 12,000. Issues were sold at 50 cents.

In its later years, publication of The Fur Worker became more irregular. The publication was suspended between May 1929 and January 1930. Between September 1930 and April 1931 it was issued under the name Fur Workers' Hope. Publication of Fur Workers' Hope was discontinued in May 1931. In June 1937 The Fur Worker was revived. In the same year the parent under switched its affiliation from the American Federation of Labor (AFL) to the Congress of Industrial Organizations (CIO). The Fur Worker continued to be published until July 1939, when it was superseded by Fur and Leather Worker.
