= Bob Wages =

American labor union leader (born 1949)

Robert E. "Bob" Wages (born August 18, 1949) is an American former labor union leader.

Born in Kansas City, Kansas, Wages studied at the University of Kansas. He then followed his father in working at a Phillips Petroleum Company refinery, and joined the Oil, Chemical and Atomic Workers' International Union (OCAW). During this period, he studied law part-time at the University of Missouri. He graduated in 1975 and began working as an attorney for the city of Raymore, Missouri, then became an assistant legal counsel for OCAW.

In 1981, Wages was appointed as the administrative assistant to the president of OCAW, and then at the end of the year, he was appointed as a vice-president of the union. He was elected to the post on an ongoing basis in 1985, and re-elected in 1988. In 1991, he was elected as president of the union, and in 1995 he was additionally elected as a vice-president of the AFL-CIO.

As leader of OCAW, Wages negotiated a merger which formed the Paper, Allied-Industrial, Chemical and Energy Workers International Union, which was completed in 1999. He became executive vice-president of the new union. He retired in 2001, but agreed to continue leading the union's negotiations on agreements in the oil industry, which were concluded in August 2002.

Trade union offices
Preceded by Joseph Misbrener	President of the Oil, Chemical, and Atomic Workers International Union; 1991–1999	Succeeded by Union merged
