= Ben Gold =

American labor leader

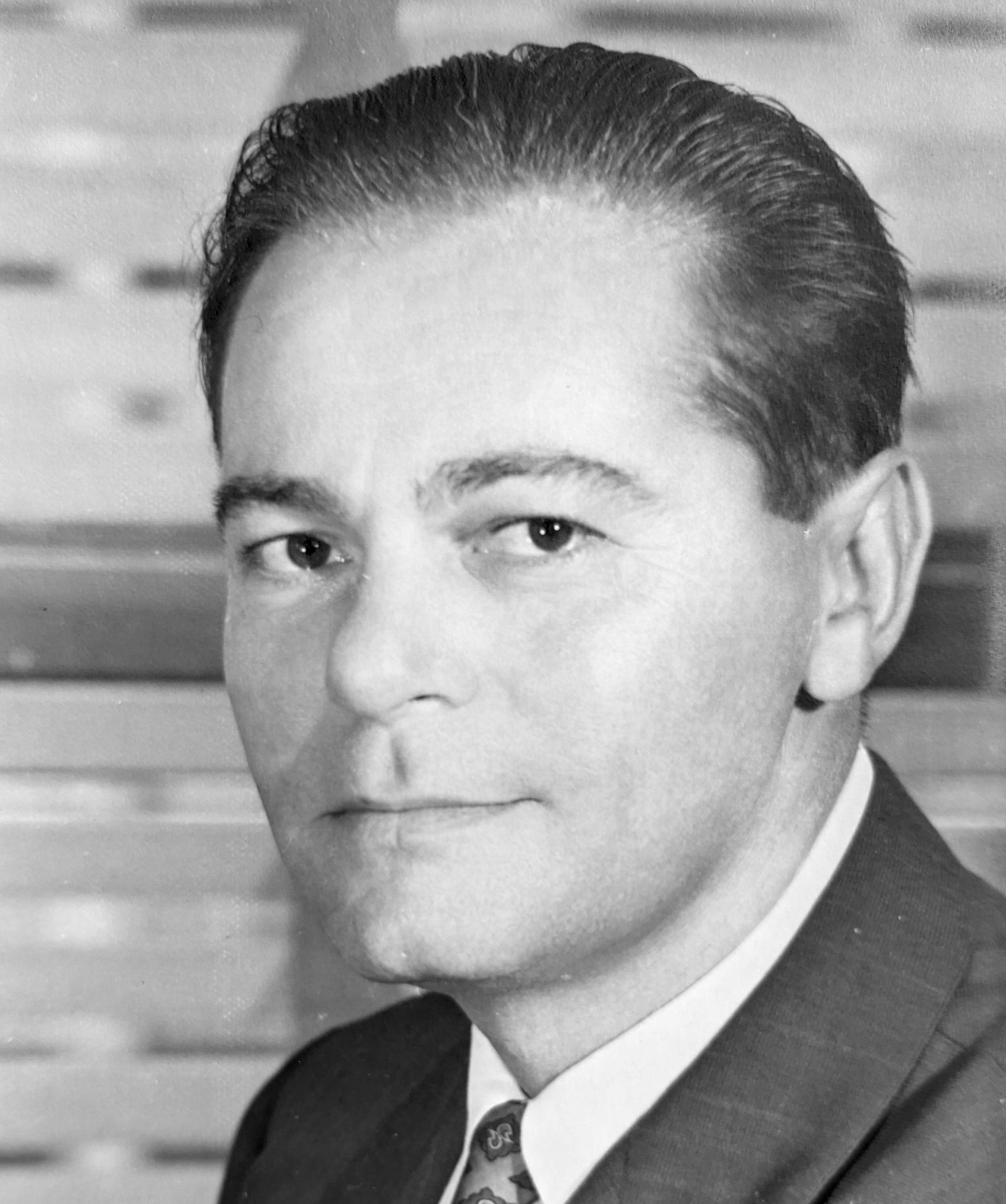
- Gold c. 1946

President of the International Fur & Leather Workers Union
- In office May 22, 1937 – October 3, 1954
- Preceded by: Philip Silberstein
- Succeeded by: Abe Feinglass

Secretary-Treasurer of the Needle Trades Workers Industrial Union
- In office January 3, 1929 – c. March 1935
- Preceded by: Office established
- Succeeded by: Office abolished

Manager of the New York Furriers' Joint Board
- In office August 10, 1935 – May 22, 1937
- In office c. September 1925 – January 3, 1929

Personal details
- Born: September 8, 1898 Bessarabia Governorate, Russian Empire
- Died: July 24, 1985 (aged 86) North Miami Beach, Florida, U.S.
- Party: Socialist (1916–1919); Communist Labor (1919–1921); Communist (1921–1950)
- Spouse: Sadie Algus
- Occupation: Labor leader, fur operator

Benjamin Gold (September 8, 1898 – July 24, 1985) was a Russian-born Jewish American labor leader and Communist Party member who was president of the International Fur and Leather Workers Union (IFLWU) from 1937 to 1955.

== Early life ==
Ben Gold was born September 8, 1898, to Israel and Sarah (Droll) Gold, Jews living in Bessarabia, a province of the Russian Empire. His father was a jeweler, active in the revolutionary movement and a member of the local Jewish self-defense corps, institutions which existed in many towns as a precaution against pogroms launched by anti-semitic Black Hundreds groups.

The Golds emigrated to the United States in 1910, where 12-year-old Ben took a variety of jobs to help support his family, working in box factories, making pocketbooks, and working in millinery shops. He eventually became an operator in a fur shop. In 1912, the 14-year-old joined the Furriers Union of the United States and Canada, which changed its name a year later to the International Fur Workers Union of the United States and Canada (IFWU). He attended Manhattan Preparatory School at night to complete his education, intending to go to law school.

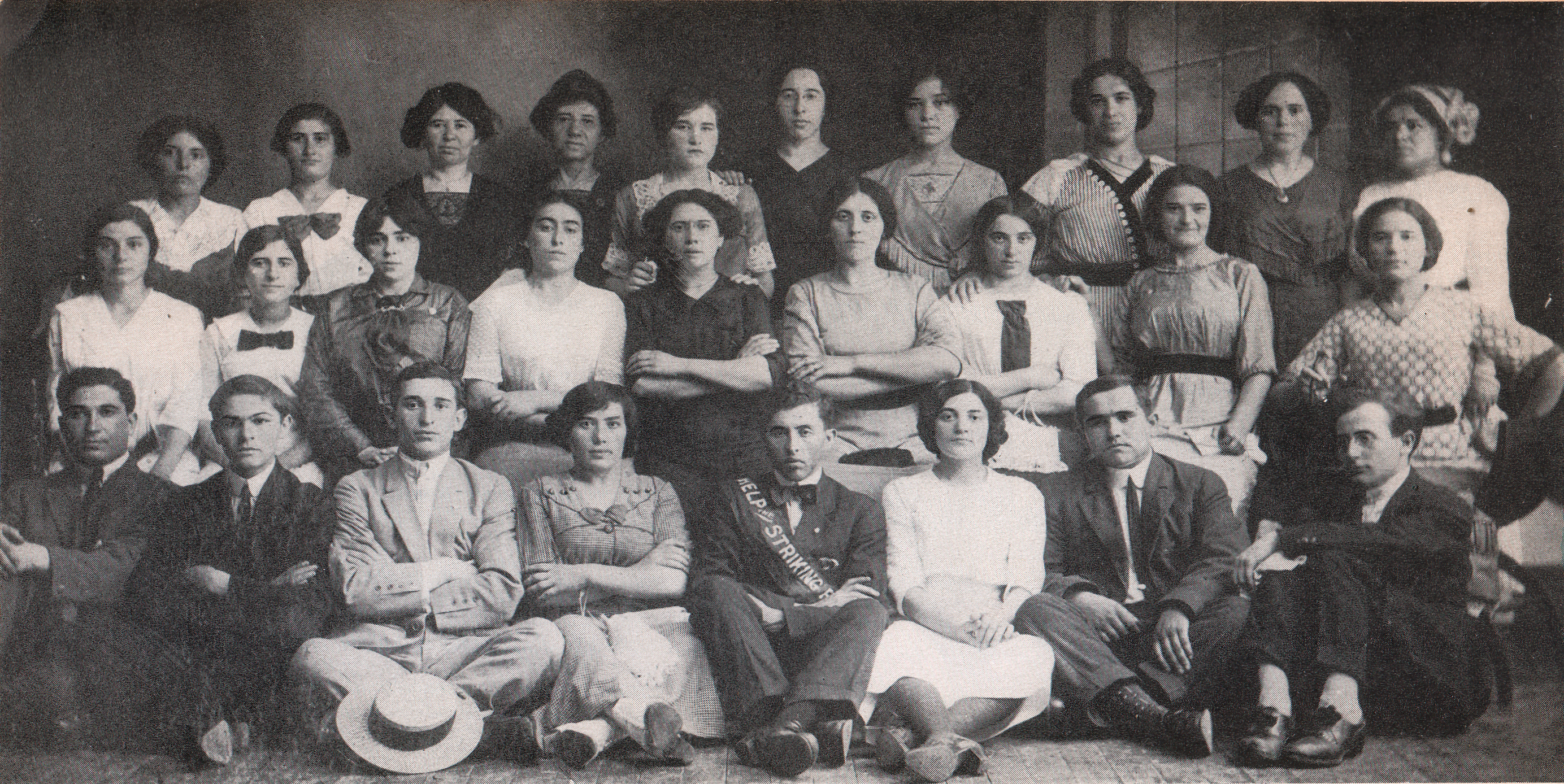
A group of fur workers active in the 1912 strike. Fourteen year-old Ben Gold is second from the left in the front row.

The same year he joined the Furriers Union, the 14-year-old Gold was elected assistant shop chairman by his local union during the first furriers' strike in the United States.

Politically active, Gold joined the Socialist Party of America in 1916.

In 1919, at the age of 21, Gold was elected to the New York Furriers' Joint Board, a council of furriers' unions whose jurisdiction covered all of New York City. In September of that year, he joined a group which broke away from the Socialist Party to form the Communist Labor Party of America.

== Communism and early trade union career ==
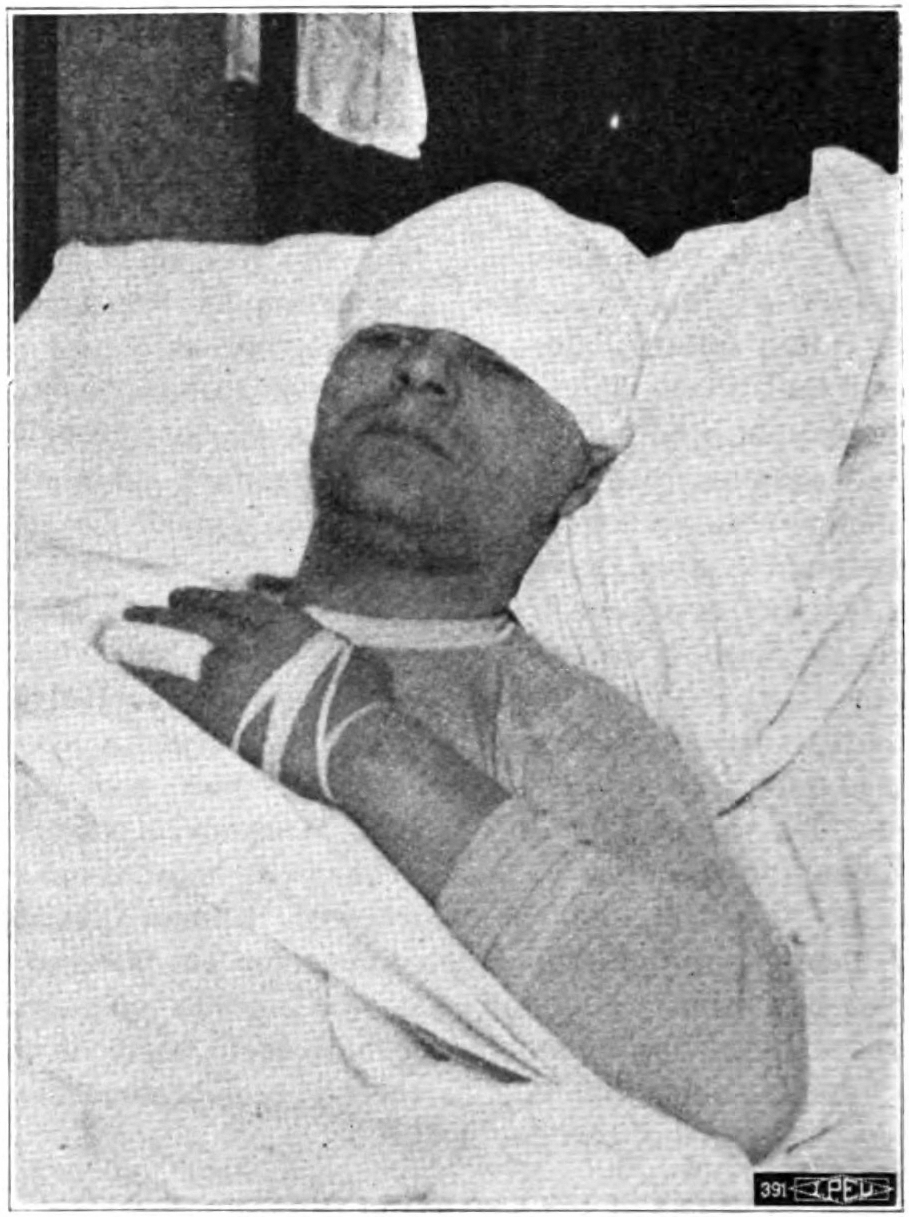
Gold in the hospital after being assaulted by "reactionaries" in the Furriers' Union c. December 1923

Gold's adherence to Communism and trade unionism intertwined to shape much of his career as a labor leader. He was an occasional political candidate of the Communist movement, running for Congress in New York's 23rd district in 1928.

In 1924, Gold was suspended from the Furriers for engaging in dual unionism because of his activities on behalf of the Communist Party of America (with which the Communist Labor Party had merged in 1921). He was reinstated in 1925, and appointed manager of the New York Furriers' Joint Board.

=== 1926 strike ===
In 1926, Gold led a massive furriers' strike in New York City. The Joint Board's contract with the city's furriers expired on January 31, 1926. Among the union's demands were a reduction in working hours to the five-day, 40-hour work week; union inspection of shops; a 25 percent wage increase; an employer contribution of 3 percent of each workers' salary to an unemployment insurance fund; a single paid holiday; and equal division of work among employees (to eliminate favoritism). The employer's association refused to negotiate over the work week, unemployment fund or equal division of work, but agreed to seek a settlement on the other terms if the union would withdraw the other three demands. Led by Gold, the Joint Board was on the verge of doing so when IFWU President Oizer Shachtman accused the Joint Board of being infiltrated by communists. The Joint Board made its recommendation to the employers all the same, who—aware of Shachtman's opposition—promptly rejected it. The employers then instituted a lockout of 8,500 workers on February 11, 1926. The union responded by calling a general strike of all 12,000 fur workers in the city on February 16, 1926.

The strike quickly turned violent. On February 19, New York City police attacked a picket line of striking workers and arrested 200 workers. On March 8, Gold called out 10,000 workers for mass picketing throughout the furriers' district. Police used clubs to beat hundreds of strikers, and then drove cars at high speed into the crowd to try to break up the pickets. Only when Gold ordered the picket to break up were law enforcement authorities able to regain control; 125 workers arrested. The police response was so brutal that a city magistrate later excoriated the police department for "undue coercion" against the striking workers.

As the strike commenced, President Shachtman went into hiding, leaving Vice President Isidor Winnick to take over as Acting President. Shachtman's disappearance significantly hindered the Joint Board's ability to stop furriers outside New York City from engaging in strikebreaking.

Certain developments seemed to indicate an early end to the strike. On March 13, a New York state judge refused to grant the employers an injunction which would force an end to the strike. In mid-April, the Eitingon Schild Company, the wealthiest fur importer in the United States, broke with the employers' association to settle with the union. The company agreed to a five-day, 40-hour work week; equal division of work; no subcontracting; and a 10 percent wage increase.

But the strike continued despite this agreement. In early April, Hugh Frayne, an organizer with the American Federation of Labor (AFL), met with a moderate faction within the Joint Board. Frayne and the moderate furriers asked AFL President William Green to personally intervene in the strike. Green and Shachtman (who had reappeared in Washington, D.C.) drew up an agreement establishing a 42-hour work week and a 10 percent wage increase. But when the proposal was presented to the membership on April 15, they overwhelmingly rejected it. The AFL barred Gold from the meeting, but the membership chanted his name and nearly rioted until he was admitted to the hall. In part, the workers rejected the proposal because they had had no hand in making it. But they also rejected the proposal because it did nothing to help Jewish workers, who needed the five-day work week provision in order to protect their Shabbat observances. Shachtman accused "radicals" of leading the near-riot and coercing the workers into rejecting the settlement. Shachtman and Green tried to get the membership to adopt the proposal a second time on May 2, but it was again turned down.

In retaliation for Shachtman and Green's attempt to end-run the local leadership, and to increase pressure on the employers, Gold asked the Joint Board to initiate a drive for the 40-hour work week which would involve every union in the city. The Board agreed, and soon the New York State Federation of Labor, the Amalgamated Clothing Workers of America, the Teachers Union, the International Ladies' Garment Workers' Union, and a number of other unions agreed to join the effort. On May 22, 1926, a mass rally filled the newly built Madison Square Garden, making it the largest labor meeting held in the city up to that time. Gold denounced labor leaders who did not attend, and declared that winning the 40-hour work week in New York City would lead to a nationwide movement which would gain the limitation throughout the nation.

The Joint Board faced a crisis, however. By May 27, only $70 remained in the Joint Board's strike fund. Gold spoke at every union hall in the city within four days of the revelation of the fiscal crisis. The union asked workers and other unions to buy "40-Hour Liberty Loan Bonds" which would be redeemable in six months. By May 31, more than $100,000 had been raised. Even though strike relief funds were paid on June 1, the Joint Board kept up the bond drive to maintain the pressure on the employers.

The fund-raising success of the union and the pressure from the 40-hour work week drive pushed the employers to agree to a new collective bargaining agreement. The manufacturers signaled their willingness to talk on May 26, but the union kept up its demand for the 40-hour week. A mediator was called in, and a new contract reached on June 11, 1926. The contract provided for the 40-hour, five-day work week; an end to overtime from December through August; time-and-a-half overtime pay for half-days from September to November; a 10 percent wage increase; 10 paid holidays; and a ban on subcontracting.

=== AFL investigation ===
Gold's success in leading the 1926 furrier workers' strike was short-lived. On July 19, 1926, President Green sent a letter to Gold demanding that the Joint Board turn over all books, papers, ledgers and materials related to the conduct of the strike. In a secret letter, Hugh Frayne assured IFWU President Shachtman that the International Union was not under investigation, and that the AFL intended only to purge the Joint Board of "radicals" and "communists." Despite his reservations, Gold turned over the Joint Board's books, and the AFL conducted its investigation throughout August and September. The goal of the investigation soon became clear: The AFL accused Gold and the other strike leaders of debauchery, wasting union money, bribery, forcing workers to join the Communist Party, coercing workers to participate in the strike, prolonging the strike on the orders of the Communist Party, and lying to the AFL investigating committee. On January 13, 1927, the AFL's final report was issued, in which the AFL demanded that the IFWU purge the Joint Board of all communists or expel the locals in question. On February 17, the New York City Central Labor Council expelled the Joint Board and its member locals; the IFWU expelled Gold and 36 other local leaders from the union on March 2.

On March 17, 1927, Gold and 10 other leaders of the Joint Board were arrested for allegedly breaking into a furrier's shop near Mineola, New York, during the 1926 strike. Although the AFL successfully pressured Clarence Darrow to not take Gold's case, it was unable to prevent Frank P. Walsh, former chairman of the federal Commission on Industrial Relations and the National War Labor Board, from doing so. Walsh formed a "Committee of 100" to provide financial and moral support to Gold and the others. The AFL tried to persuade the members of the committee to resign, but none did. At Gold's trial, which began on April 14, the prosecution repeatedly asked if Gold was a member of the Communist Party, if he knew communists, and if he endorsed the party's principles. Walsh protested that these questions had nothing to do with the alleged crime of burglary, but the judge overruled his objections. Nevertheless, Gold and one other person were acquitted, but nine others were not.

The AFL also accused Gold of allegedly bribing police officers to give the union favorable treatment during the 1926 strike. Charges were filed on March 4, 1927. Gold's trial opened on March 30, 1927, as his trial for assault continued on Long Island and the AFL-dominated Joint Council was attempting to take over the fur unions in New York City. Several witnesses testified that the police received $3,800 a week from the Joint Board, but Gold, the Joint Board and their supporters (which included the New York State Federation of Labor) alleged an AFL-led conspiracy to frame them. The trial was suspended on June 3 after two prosecution witnesses revealed they had perjured themselves in an attempt to implicate Gold. Gold and the other defendants were found innocent on July 21, 1927, after the court could find no evidence of any misuse of funds. Indeed, most testimony focused on police brutality against the union and its members, significantly undermining the prosecution's claim of police favoritism.

=== 1927 strike ===
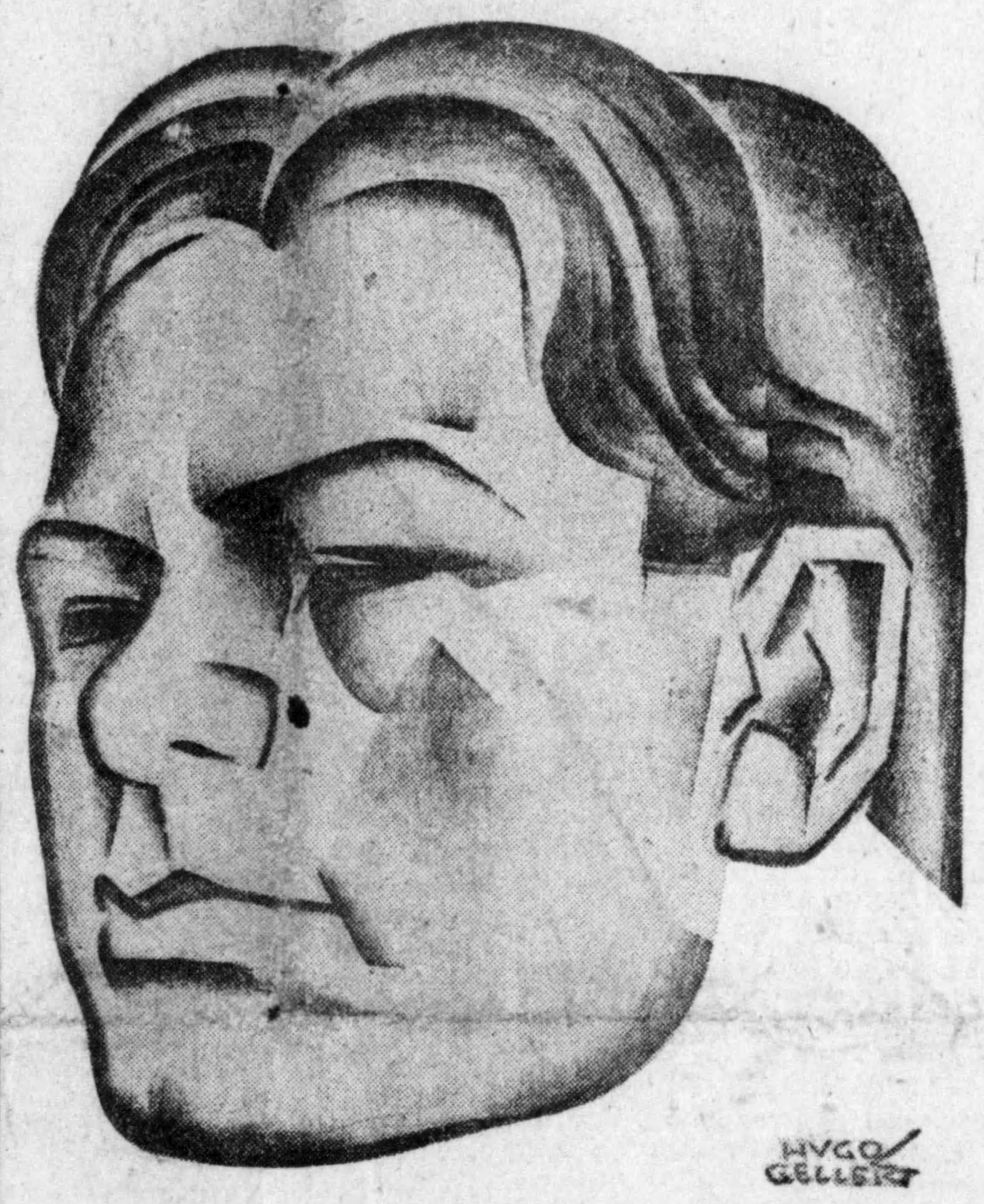
Portrait by Hugo Gellert, 1927

The IFWU, meanwhile, organized a new "Joint Council" to replace the Joint Board. On March 2, 1927, the Joint Council announced it was the true collective bargaining agent for all New York City fur workers, that it alone administered their union contracts, and that they must become members of the Joint Council or be fired by their employers. Thousands of workers refused; many were fired, and some had to be forcibly removed from their place of employment in protest. Gold and the Joint Board fought the Joint Council's actions. As the dispute between the Joint Board and Joint Council continued, employers ceased to honor the 1926 contract. Soon, the work week crept as high as 70 hours over seven days. Overtime pay was eliminated, wages were cut by as much as 50 percent, and subcontracting became rampant.

Although Gold was on trial for assault and bribery, he led the Joint Board in a counter-organizing campaign against the AFL-dominated Joint Council. He personally led mass pickets and protests in the fur district of New York City in late March 1927. The AFL attempted to undercut the Joint Board by releasing statements that the Gold-led union was seeking a "peace treaty" with the Joint Council, while accusing the Joint Board of coercing workers into joining. Despite AFL assertions that workers were stampeding into the Joint Council, the Gold-led Joint Board had the support of the vast majority of workers in the New York City fur industry. The Joint Board's strength among the workers was so strong that on May 3, 1927, the Fur Trimming Manufacturers' Association broke with the employers' group and signed a contract with Gold's Joint Board—reaffirming the 1926 contract and restoring working conditions to their June 1926 level.

Gold began threatening a new strike to force the employers to honor the terms of the 1926 contract and win recognition of the Joint Board again. The AFL accused the Joint Board of being a communist front, and pleaded for the public to withdraw support for it. In confidential talks with the New York City police, the AFL conceded that Gold's union had the support of the workers and that the only way to defeat the "Red-led" union was a massive show of police force which would intimidate the strikers. Mass arrests and heavy fines, coupled with long jail terms, would bankrupt the Joint Board and terrify the protesters, AFL officials and staff told the police. The strike began on June 3, 1927, with several thousand picketers taking to the streets and police arresting hundreds of workers. When the police proved unable to control the large number of strikers, they began isolating groups of two or three people (often women) and beating them with clubs. The extreme police response led Gold to call strike after strike, most of which were broken up by police attacks on peaceful picketers and which led to scores of arrests and jail sentences. The AFL and its leadership again accused Gold and the Joint Board of terrorizing workers in order to force them to join the union, and claimed that only the Joint Council had the support of the majority of workers.

But by mid-July 1927, the AFL's claims were proven to be false. The Joint Council lost most of its support, and the Gold-led Joint Board received recognition by companies employing a majority of workers in the fur district. Most employers no longer compelled their workers to join the Joint Council, and the Joint Board's 1926 contract was re-established and enforced.

=== Creation of a new union ===
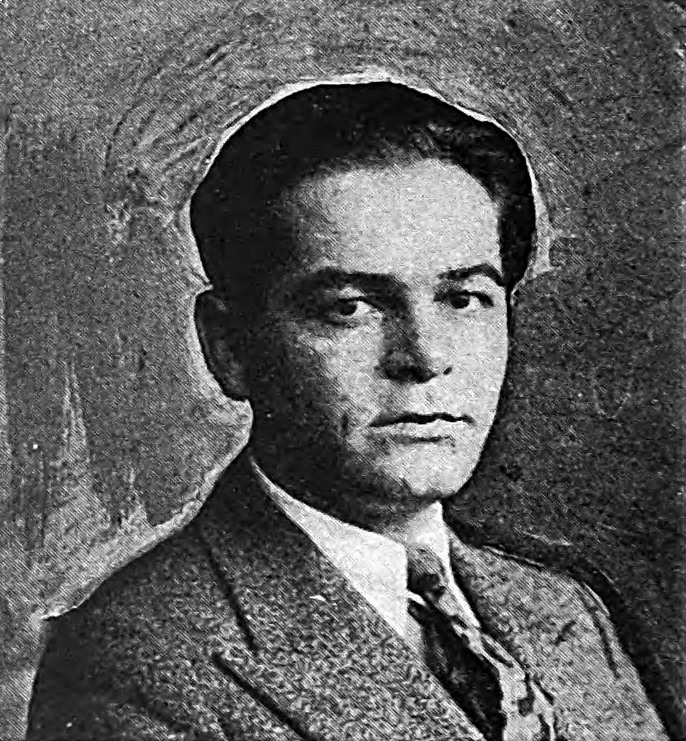
Gold c. 1928

As the Joint Board sought to re-establish itself in New York City during the June–July 1927 strike, the IFWU moved against Gold in yet another way.

President Shachtman issued a call for the biennial convention of the IFWU to be held in the Executive Council chamber at the AFL Building in Washington, D.C., on July 13, 1927. The union's constitution required the convention to be held in May, but AFL leaders (including the influential Executive Council member, Matthew Woll) demanded that Shachtman delay the meeting until such time as he could guarantee that a large majority of delegates would be pro-AFL. "As you well know, your International Union is today being financed to a great part by the reorganizing activities going on here in New York City," Woll and two others wrote Shachtman, "and that without this income your organization would be practically bankrupt." The letter was thinly veiled blackmail, and Shachtman knuckled under to it.

Nonetheless, Gold and 35 other delegates from New York City appeared at the convention and demanded to be recognized. The Credentials Committee refused to seat them, even though the Joint Board represented about 85 percent of the total IFWU membership. AFL President Green—tired of the constant conflict in New York City, believing Shachtman and the leadership of the IFWU were incompetent, and convinced that fighting the Joint Board was a waste of money—persuaded Shachtman to at least let Gold and the other Joint Board delegates speak before the convention to make their case. Gold delivered an impassioned speech in which he denounced the attacks on the political views of the Joint Board's leadership, argued that the union should be spending its money building solidarity and fighting employers, and pushed for strong internal democratic procedures in the IFWU. But despite his pleas, the convention refused to seat the delegates, and then revoked the charters of the locals which comprised the Joint Board.

These efforts to undercut Gold and the Joint Board also failed. Several IFWU locals outside New York City passed resolutions criticizing the International Union's actions, and worker support for the Joint Council dwindled even further. On July 6, 1928, the AFL notified the Joint Council that it was withdrawing all staff and monetary support for the rump union. When the news leaked to the leaders of other needle trade unions, President Green was forced to publicly reiterate the AFL's support for the non-communist union. But the new flow of funds and staff did nothing to resuscitate the Joint Council. Worse, from the AFL's perspective, the Joint Board then called several strikes in July 1928 and won major wage increases from the employers.

In the summer and fall of 1928, Gold began building support for a new international union of fur workers. He met with the leaders of eight non-New York City fur workers' locals as well as a left-wing group of fur workers who were attempting to disaffiliate from what remained of the Joint Council. Included in the new union were 15,000 dressmakers and other garment workers comprising the left wing of the International Ladies Garment Workers Union. The new Needle Trades Workers Industrial Union was formed on January 1, 1929. Louis Hyman was elected President, and Ben Gold was elected Secretary-Treasurer. The thirty-nine member General Executive Board included African Americans, Russians, Poles, Greeks, women and even a youth delegate.

== Needle Trades Workers Industrial Union ==
=== Secretary-Treasurer ===
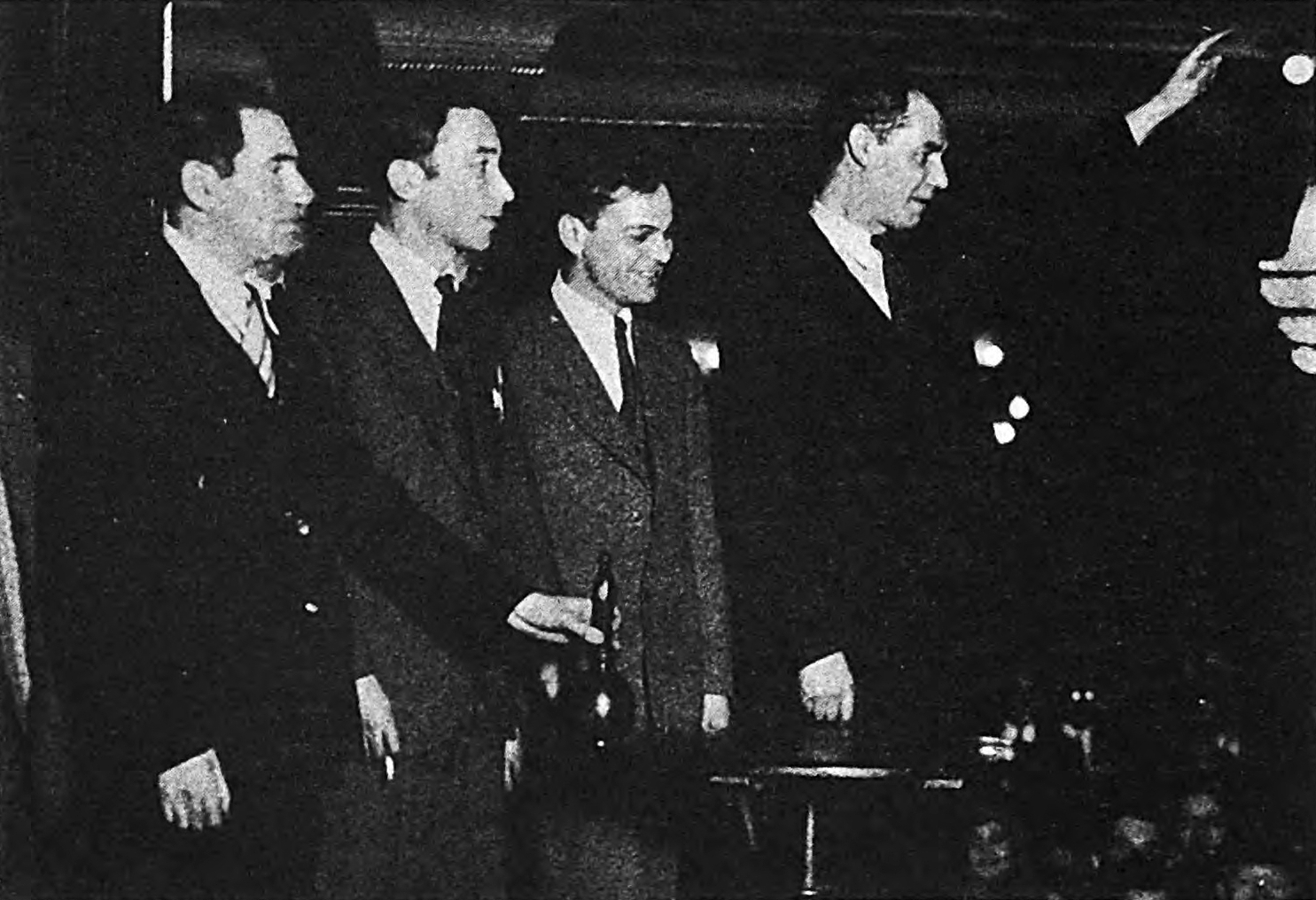
Leaders of the Needle Trades Workers Industrial Union address striking workers c. 1929. Left to right: P. Goodman, Sascha Zimmerman, Ben Gold, and Louis Hyman.

As chief strategist as well as secretary-treasurer for the Needle Trades Workers Industrial Union (NTWIU), Ben Gold pursued an aggressive and militant policy of collective bargaining. The formation of the union was inauspicious: Within the year the Great Depression began, leading to thousands of layoffs in the fur industry and strong downward pressure on wages. But even as early as February 1929, as the economy slid toward depression, Hyman and Gold were announcing a series of strikes designed to raise wages. The new union's first strike occurred in the garment industry in February 1929. A second strike in the New York City's fur industry occurred in June 1929, as NTWIU sought to organize AFL-affiliated locals of fur workers into the breakaway union. With nearly all the city's fur workers already in the NTWIU, however, Gold made little headway against the anti-communist AFL locals. Meanwhile, press reports implied that most of the city's fur workers belonged to the AFL, inverting the true situation. On occasion, violence broke out between the two groups. The AFL also sought to strip the NTWIU's New York City locals of the right to use the phrase "fur workers" in their name.

As the internecine union struggles continued, Gold led strikes in both the garment and fur industries. Sporadic violence also broke out during these events. More than 3,500 union members struck for shorter working hours and higher wages on June 17, 1931, collective bargaining goals which were considered madness by nearly all labor leaders. Yet, Gold won an increase in working hours, leading to a guaranteed 40-hour work week well as increased pay—an achievement important in the establishment of the standard American work week. In August 1932, Gold won yet another agreement retaining the union's work-week and pay goals in the fur industry despite the worsening depression. The union also launched an assault on sweatshop conditions in the garment industry in early 1933, an effort the AFL-led Joint Council labeled communistic.

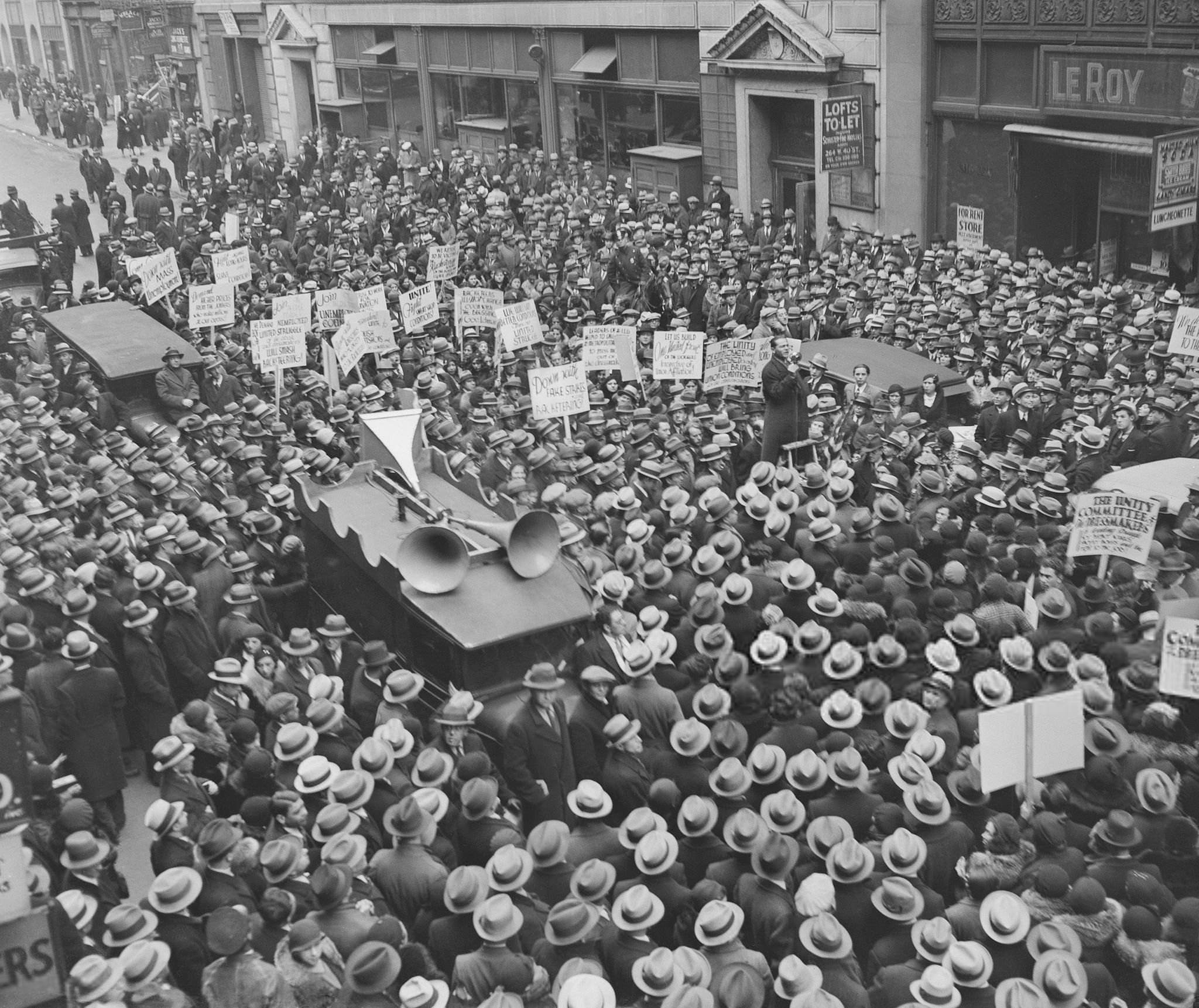
Gold speaks at a workers demonstration in the Garment District of Manhattan, New York, February 1, 1933

Battles with the AFL-led Joint Council continued to occupy much of Gold's time. The stridently anti-communist labor leader, Matthew Woll, had been placed in charge of a three-person committee of AFL Executive Council members charged with assisting the IFWU and breaking the NTWIU. Woll and the two other council members funneled funds and staff into the IFWU and assisted the IFWU in strategizing ways to win back the loyalty of the majority of fur workers in New York City. Violence broke out when AFL supporters stormed NTWIU offices in April 1933. Gold, leading the fur workers' division of the NTWIU, led a series of counter-protests and marches through the fur district in May and June 1933. The AFL also continued to work closely with the New York City police, providing law enforcement officials with information on dates, times and places Gold's union would strike or protest and pushing hard for a strong police response to intimidate the communist-led union. In July, police clashed repeatedly with marching workers led personally by Gold, leading to a number of arrests and hundreds of worker injuries. In one case, police on horseback charged at a full gallop into a peaceful march on July 5, 1933. Despite the police violence and opposition of the AFL, the "dynamic leadership of Communist Ben Gold" helped the fur workers in 1933 to salvage a 35-hour work week and win an increase in pay from $38 to $50 a week.

When the Communist Party formed the Trade Union Unity League in late August 1929, Gold affiliated the NTWIU with the umbrella labor group. The League was shuttered in 1935 when the Communist Party abandoned its strategy of dual unionism and "boring from within" in favor of the Popular Front.

Gold also worked hard to integrate the NTWIU. While other unions actively discriminated against African Americans and other minorities or ignored the issue of race, Gold encouraged a bottom-up attack on racism. He actively involved members in "trials" of union members who had used racist language or engaged in discriminatory behavior, and his efforts were largely successful in weeding racism out of the union.

Meanwhile, Gold also was heavily involved in writing the "Fur Code." The National Industrial Recovery Act, enacted on June 16, 1933, established the National Recovery Administration and authorized the agency to establish voluntary agreements within each industry regulating working hours, pay rates, and prices. Hundreds of industry codes were created, including a code governing the fur industry. Gold was appointed to the panel crafting the Fur Industry Code, and on July 21, 1933, the panel established a preliminary "blanket code" providing a 40-hour week and a minimum wage of $14 a week (about $216 a week in 2008 inflation-adjusted dollars).

In late 1933, Gold served a brief prison sentence after having been arrested for participating in a hunger march in Wilmington, Delaware. Hunger marches had been occurring throughout the United States since 1931. Catholic social activist Dorothy Day herself encouraged Gold to participate in a march from New York City to Washington, D.C. Gold was one of 315 marchers who left New York City on November 29, 1932, bound for Washington. The marchers reached Wilmington on December 2, their number having increased by several hundred. Their permit to march in the city was withdrawn. That night, the police herded most of the marchers into a warehouse downtown, but Gold, most of the women and most of the marchers from New England stayed in a rented church two blocks away. That night, the marchers at the church were refused permission to hold a meeting in the street, so they held it on the church steps. When the police tried to stop the meeting, the marchers resisted. The police began beating the people listening to the speaker, and the marchers fled into the church and barricaded the doors. The police fired tear gas through the windows of the building, then broke down the doors and entered the building with weapons drawn. The marchers resisted by hurling chairs at the police, but were beaten and gassed repeatedly until subdued. Twenty-three marchers, including Gold, were arrested. Four police and three marchers were hospitalized. Gold was convicted of incitement to riot, and served a brief prison term in Wilmington in late 1933 and early 1934. Gold participated in additional hunger marches in 1933 and 1934, and was arrested again in Albany, New York, in late October 1934.

Gold's battles with the AFL also continued in 1934. Joint Board and Joint Council supporters fought with fists, bricks and clubs in January 1934. But the AFL group continued to shrink as the Great Depression worsened, and IFWU leaders feared for the survival of their union. To forestall any peace talks, AFL President Green launched a major initiative to drive communists and communist sympathizers out of all AFL-affiliated local, national and international unions. AFL accusations against Gold and his union also continued.

In 1934 and 1935, Gold led the garment and fur workers in two successful strikes which propelled his union into a merger with the IFWU. The first was week-long strike by 4,000 fur workers in late August 1934, which led to additional wage increases and stricter enforcement of contract provisions. The second was a strike by 10,000 garment workers in April 1935 which led to a contract guaranteeing a minimum weekly wage.

=== Merger with IFWU ===
The success of the NTWIU and particularly Gold's aggressive leadership of the union's fur workers division significantly undermined support for the AFL-supported IFWU. Gold asserted in August 1934 that the IFWU was in financial trouble and had too few members to ensure viability, but the IFWU denied his claims. IFWU President Pietro Lucchi, however, knew that Gold was correct. In May 1935, his union near bankruptcy, he approached David Dubinsky, President of the ILGWU, for an infusion of funds. Dubinsky turned him down. Lucchi next appealed to AFL President Green, who appointed a committee composed of Woll, Dubinsky, and Sidney Hillman (President of the Amalgamated Clothing Workers) to consider a fund-raising effort. But the committee would not meet until June 18, and by then the union would have collapsed. Given Green's disinclination to support the IFWU in 1927, some scholars conclude that Green purposefully delayed the committee meeting in order to let the IFWU collapse.

At the IFWU convention in Toronto, Ontario, Canada, the week of May 19, 1935, delegates voted to establish a Unity Committee whose charge was to seek and win immediate merger with the NTWIU. The committee met on May 27, 1935, with its NTWIU counterparts, and quickly hammered out a merger agreement.

The merger convention opened on June 20, 1935, at the Manhattan Opera House. In a final attempt to stall merger, on June 19 Green announced that any union which admitted communists as members would have its charter pulled by the AFL Executive Council. The merger proceeded despite Green's threat. More than 3,000 delegates from the NTWIU met on an upper floor, and about 2,500 delegates (nearly all the union's members) from the IFWU met on the ground floor. The same speakers addressed both conventions, although by prior agreement Gold was not permitted to speak. When Gold appeared about an hour after the two conventions opened, he was greeted with chants of "We want Gold!", "Let Gold speak!", and "Gold! Gold! Gold!" Gold sat impassive in his seat while he received a standing ovation, and it was clear that a wide majority of the members of both conventions supported him. On June 21, Lucchi and the executive board of the merged organization met in Long Island City, Queens, and reinstated Gold as a member in good standing of the IFWU.

Under an agreement reached by the merger conventions, leadership elections for the New York City locals of the merged IFWU took place 40 days later. Gold was elected to his old position of business manager of the Joint Council on August 10, 1935, defeating a candidate put forth by the AFL by a greater than 2-to-1 majority.

=== Business manager once again ===
Gold was business manager of the New York City Joint Council for two years. Since the IFWU had just held its biennial convention in May 1935, new elections for officers of the international union could not be held until 1937. So, despite overwhelming member support, Gold had to wait to run for president of the IFWU. He was not idle, however. Relations between various New York City locals were acrimonious after years of inter-union warfare, many employers were openly ignoring provisions of the contract because the union's attention was elsewhere, and organized crime had infiltrated many union shops.

The contracts controlled by the Joint Council expired on February 1, 1936. Gold faced a difficult task: In just six months, he had to rebuild the locals which had remained with the IFWU while preparing the union for a strike in the depths of a depression. A strike was authorized on January 18, but Gold quickly accepted the services of an impartial mediator to assist with the negotiations. In the final few days of January, Mayor Fiorello H. La Guardia intervened and heard presentations from both sides. The intervention by government officials worked, and a new contract reached on February 1.

Gold also led a number of organizing drives among fur and garment workers in New York City, so that by May 1937 the union had nearly 35,000 members. Continuing a campaign he began in 1927, Gold also purged the union's locals of organized crime influence.

== Antitrust prosecution ==
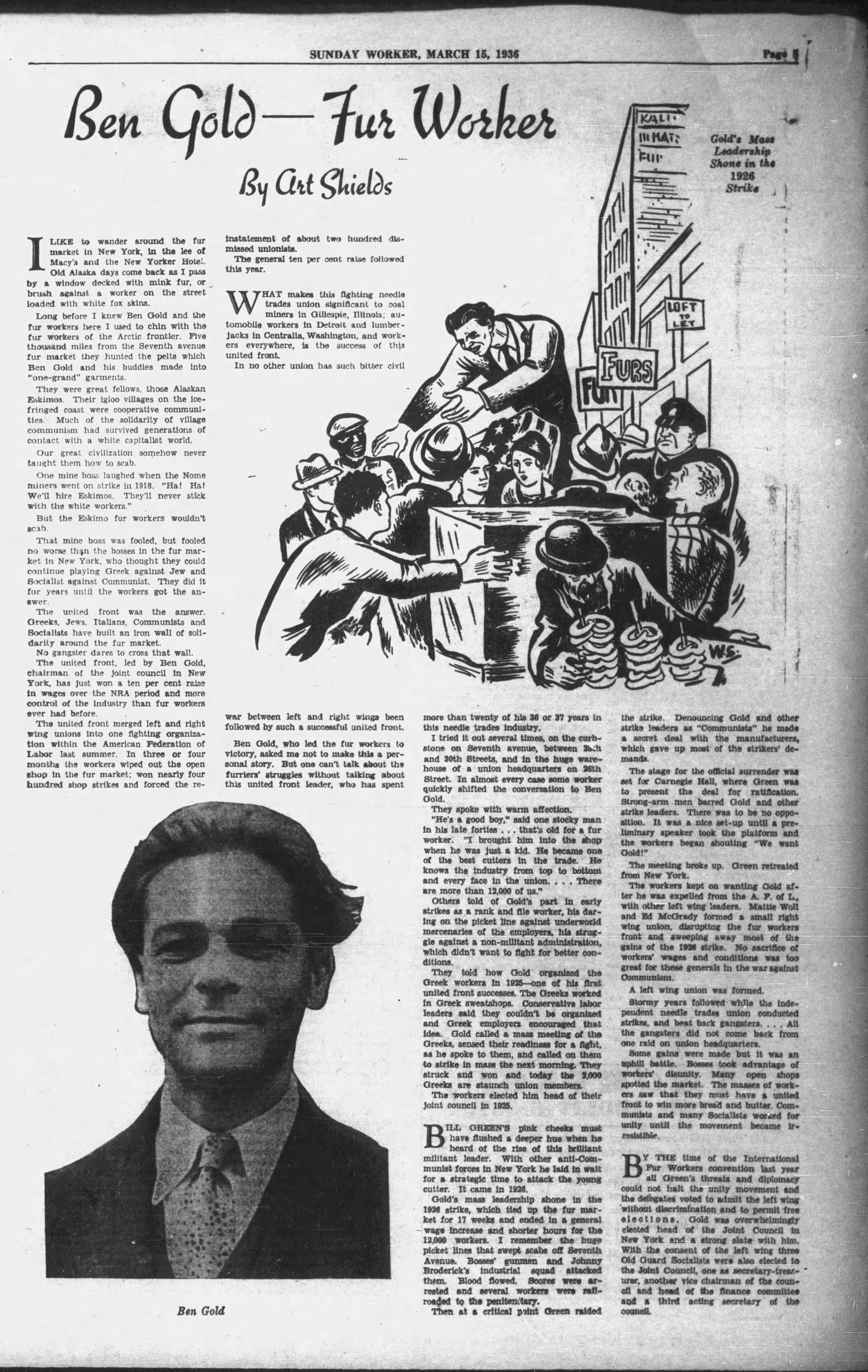
"Ben Gold—Fur Worker," a profile of Gold by Art Shields for the Daily Worker, published March 15, 1936

On November 6, 1933, Gold and about 80 other individuals were indicted for violations of federal antitrust law. Former IFWU presidents Morris Kaufman and Pietro Lucchi, the IFWU itself, several of IFWU locals and local leaders, as well as 68 employers and several organized crime figures were also included in the indictment. The indictment alleged that Louis "Lepke" Buchalter and Jacob "Gurrah" Shapiro—co-founders of the infamous Murder, Inc. murder-for-hire organization—formed a group of employers known as the "Fur Dressers Factor Corporation" to fix prices and eliminate competition. The employers allegedly paid higher wages to unions which agreed to participate in the scheme by striking uncooperative businesses, and Buchalter and Shapiro provided the muscle to force other furriers out of the business (which included bombings, acid throwing, kidnapping, arson and more).

After several defendants were granted their own separate trials and charges against others dropped, the court reached its verdict on December 16, 1937. Gold was convicted of violating the Sherman Antitrust Act and sentenced to one year in prison. It was the first conviction of a labor union official or labor union under the Sherman Act. After the convictions, the government undertook additional investigations against the IFWU and now-defunct NTWIU for violations of the Sherman Act.

But Gold and his union co-defendants appealed their convictions, and on December 19, 1938, the Court of Appeals for the Second Circuit overturned the convictions of all but three union officials. Gold's conviction was among those voided.

The government then reinstated charges in February 1940 against Gold, the NTWIU and 28 other labor leaders based on allegations not pursued in 1933. Charges against six labor leaders were dropped on March 20, 1940, and four others but Gold and 17 others were tried. Despite one witness recanting most of his accusatory testimony on the witness stand, Gold and IFWU Vice President Irving Potash were convicted of these additional antitrust charges. As the union raised a $100,000 defense fund for Gold and Potash, the government brought a fresh set of charges against Gold on May 17, 1940, accusing him of jury tampering during his first trial. As the jury deliberated Gold's fate, a group of employers sued Gold and the NTWIU for $3 million in damages under the Clayton Antitrust Act, and accusations of witness tampering were levied against Gold.

A mistrial occurred in the Gold jury tampering case on June 28, 1940, after the jury was unable to reach a verdict.

Gold's second jury tampering trial (which now included the witness tampering charge) began on July 1, 1940. Gold and his three co-defendants were acquitted on July 11, 1940.

Meanwhile, Gold's appeal on the second set of Sherman Antitrust Act violations was winding its way through the courts. On May 27, 1940, the Supreme Court of the United States issued its ruling in Apex Hosiery Co. v. Leader 310 U.S. 469 (1940). In that case, a union had engaged in a sit-down strike which shuttered a hosiery company's operations and prevented it from fulfilling its interstate contracts. The union was indicted and convicted for violating the Sherman Antitrust Act. But the Supreme Court disagreed:

The mere fact that strikes or agreements not to work, entered into by laborers to compel employers to yield to their demands, may restrict the power of such employers to compete in the market with those not subject to such demands does not bring the agreement within the condemnation of the Sherman Act.

Following the reasoning laid down by the Supreme Court in Apex Hosiery, the Court of Appeals for the Second Circuit once more voided the antitrust convictions imposed on Gold and the others in the case. The government declined to prosecute Gold further.

== Presidency ==
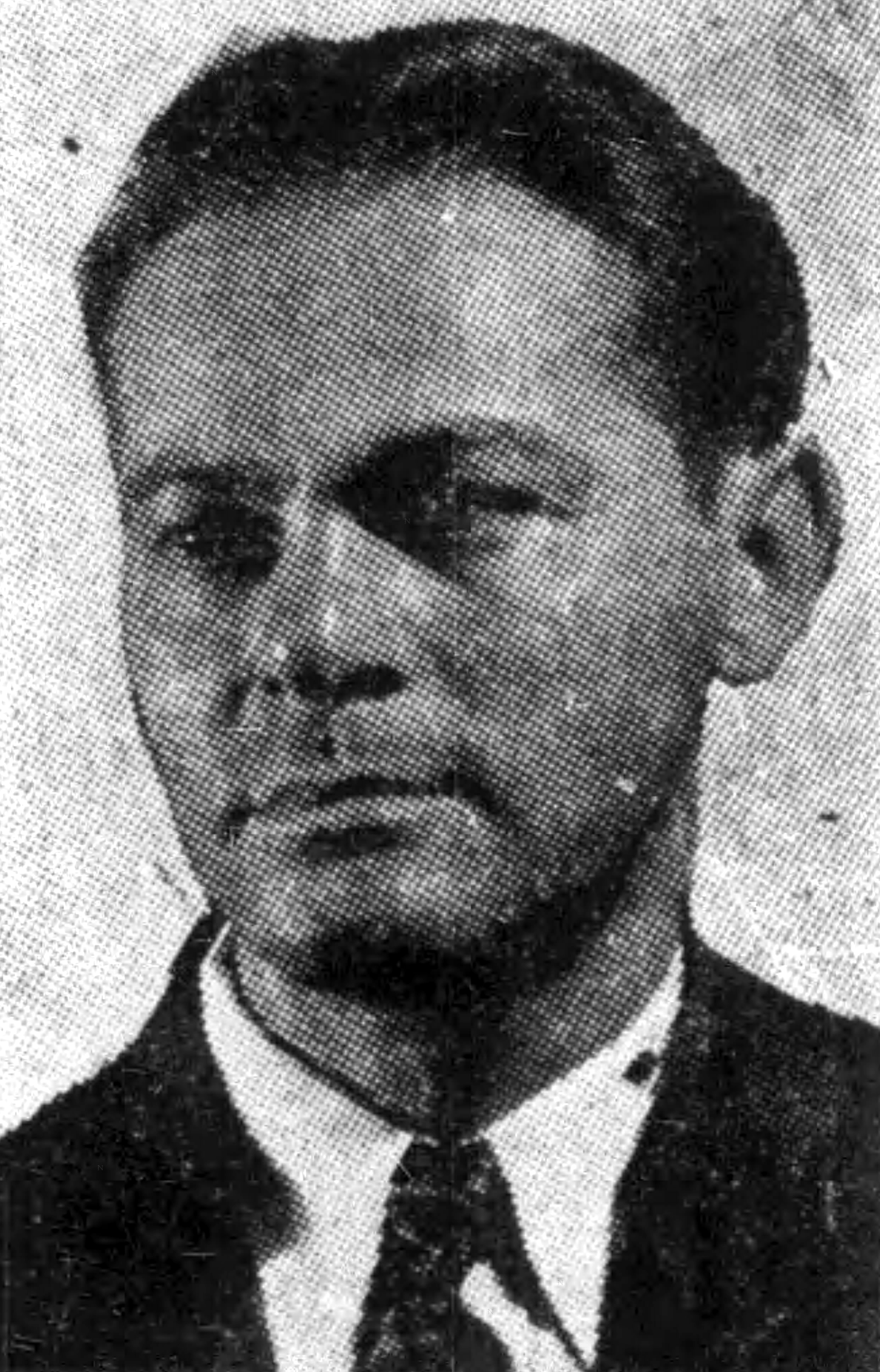
Gold c. 1933

Gold was elected president of the International Fur Workers Union in May 1937. Immediately after his election, Gold disaffiliated the IFWU from the American Federation of Labor and joined the Congress of Industrial Organizations (CIO). The change in affiliation was driven almost solely by Gold, and shocked the members of the union. He was elected to the CIO executive council.

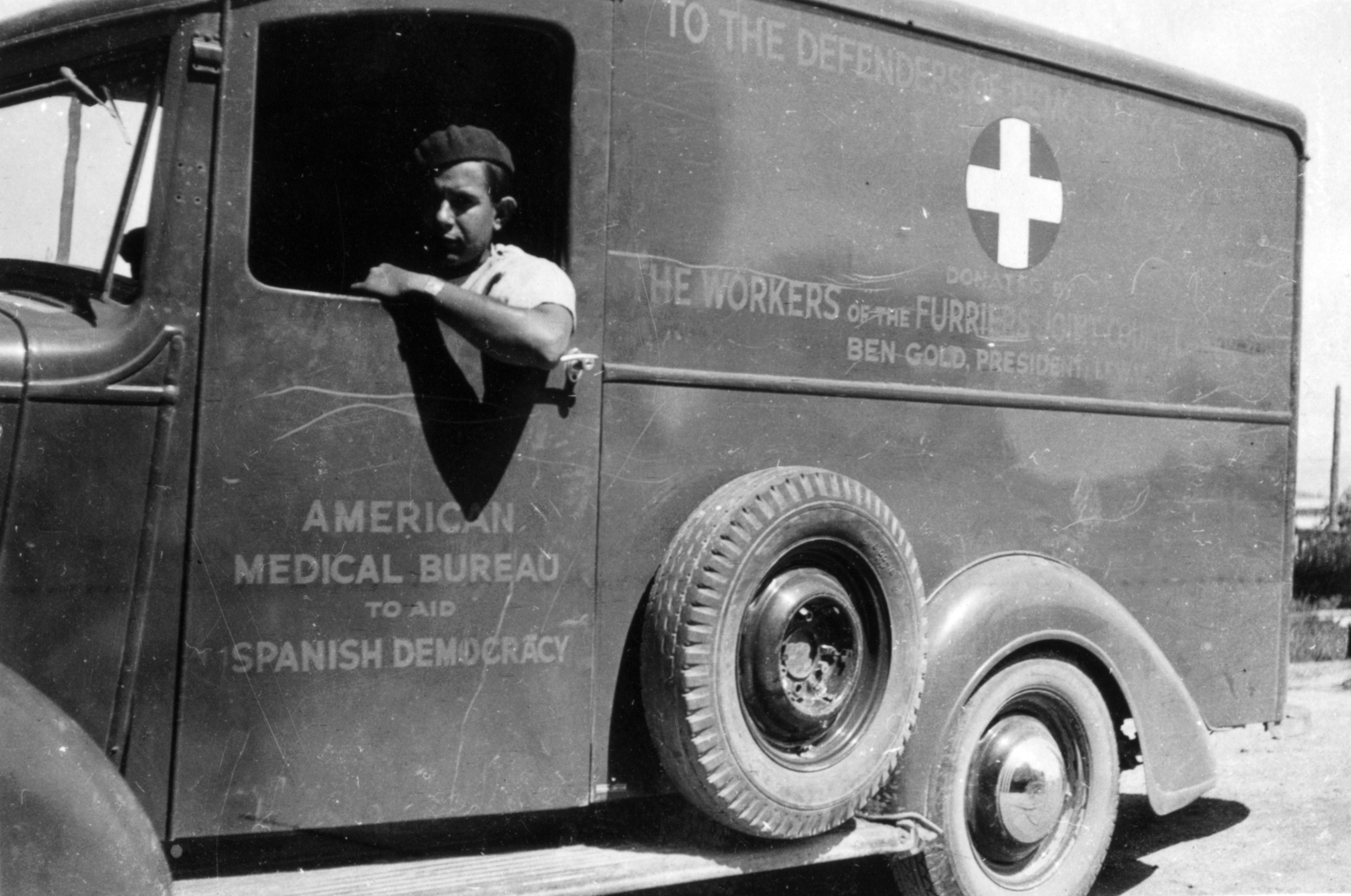
An American Medical Bureau ambulance donated by the Furriers Joint Council Union bearing Gold's name, 1937

CIO affiliation did not, however, protect the IFWU or Gold from political attacks. John L. Lewis, then the president of the CIO, was a strong anti-communist. In late January 1938, Lewis publicly announced that he would pursue a policy barring communists from membership in the CIO. Moderates within the IFWU denounced Gold for using "Hitler methods" to retain power, and pleaded with Lewis to intervene. In May 1938, the U.S. House of Representatives established the House Committee Investigating Un-American Activities as a successor to the Special Committee on Un-American Activities (which had spent the last three years investigating Nazi Germany's attempts to influence American public opinion). Rep. Martin Dies, Jr. was named chair of the committee, and charged with continuing the investigations into Nazi propaganda and initiating new investigations into the activities of the Ku Klux Klan. When committee members voiced support for the Klan and ignored the Nazi threat, Dies concentrated the committee's work on communist infiltration of the labor movement. Dies eagerly permitted the AFL time before the committee to denounce the CIO and the IFWU as riddled with communists and communist sympathizers—accusations CIO representatives called "nonsense" and Gold denounced as redbaiting.

Gold continued to pursue an aggressive collective bargaining policy until the beginning of World War II. Within weeks of taking over as president, he authorized a sympathy strike of 13,000 fur workers in New York City to support striking fur workers in Canada. The protests, rallies and spot strikes continued as Gold pushed to organize the remaining fur shops in New York City. Signed contracts were reached with newly organized employers in July 1937.

Employers, however, often fought back, and in the spring of 1938 a lengthy strike nearly ended in defeat for the union. The U.S. economy had risen to its pre-depression levels by the spring of 1937, but a strong recession began in late summer (triggered in part by large reductions in federal spending, higher bank reserve requirements, and reductions in disposable income brought about by implementation of the Social Security Act). Between August 1937 and May 1938, industrial production fell by 30 percent, the economy contracted by more than 6 percent, and unemployment rose from 5 million to over 9 million. The steep recession led many employers to resist union demands. On February 11, 1938, employers locked out 4,000 fur workers as the IFWU contracts expired. Gold hesitated calling a strike for seven weeks, seeking peace with the manufacturers, but finally called all fur workers out in a general strike on March 30. Hoping for a quick end to the strike and alarmed by the lockout, Gold initially kept pickets and rallies small. But locked out workers attacked a fur dealer on April 1, and police retaliated against the pickets with clubs and beatings. Infuriated, Gold ordered all the union's members out into the streets. The police responded by attempting to use violence to intimidate the strikers, and the union responded in kind. For seven weeks, the fur district in New York City was in a state of near-riot. The union filed unfair labor practice charges against the employers, and the NLRB moved on May 6 to investigate. Mass picketing and mass rallies continued, and the employers asked Mayor LaGuardia and the police to end the strike. On May 13, the parties agreed to submit their disputes to Dr. Paul Abelson, an impartial arbitrator with the National Recovery Administration. Thirteen days later, Dr. Abelson announced a tentative agreement, and IFWU members ratified the contract on May 26. Although Gold publicly characterized the strike as a victory for the union, he privately conceded that the strike had been a very near thing.

Determined to expand the union, Gold merged the IFWU with the National Leather Workers' Association (NLWA). The IFWU had organized leather workers over the years but never concertedly. The NLWA was formed by four local unions in Massachusetts in 1933, and affiliated with the CIO in 1937. By 1939, however, the NLWA had only 14 locals (half of which actually functioned) and only 5,000 dues-paying members. The two unions agreed to merge in March 1939. The NLWA approved the merger during its 5th National Convention in Boston, Massachusetts, April 29 to May 2, and the IFWU approved the merger at its annual convention in New York City on May 14. Ben Gold was elected the president of the newly amalgamated union, which adopted "International Fur and Leather Workers Union of the United States and Canada" (IFLWU)as its new name. The new union maintained distinctly separate fur and leather divisions. Each division had its own executive board and conventions and maintained its own finances. But the amalgamated union was nonetheless effective: Within a year, the union had organized 25,000 new workers into 42 new locals.

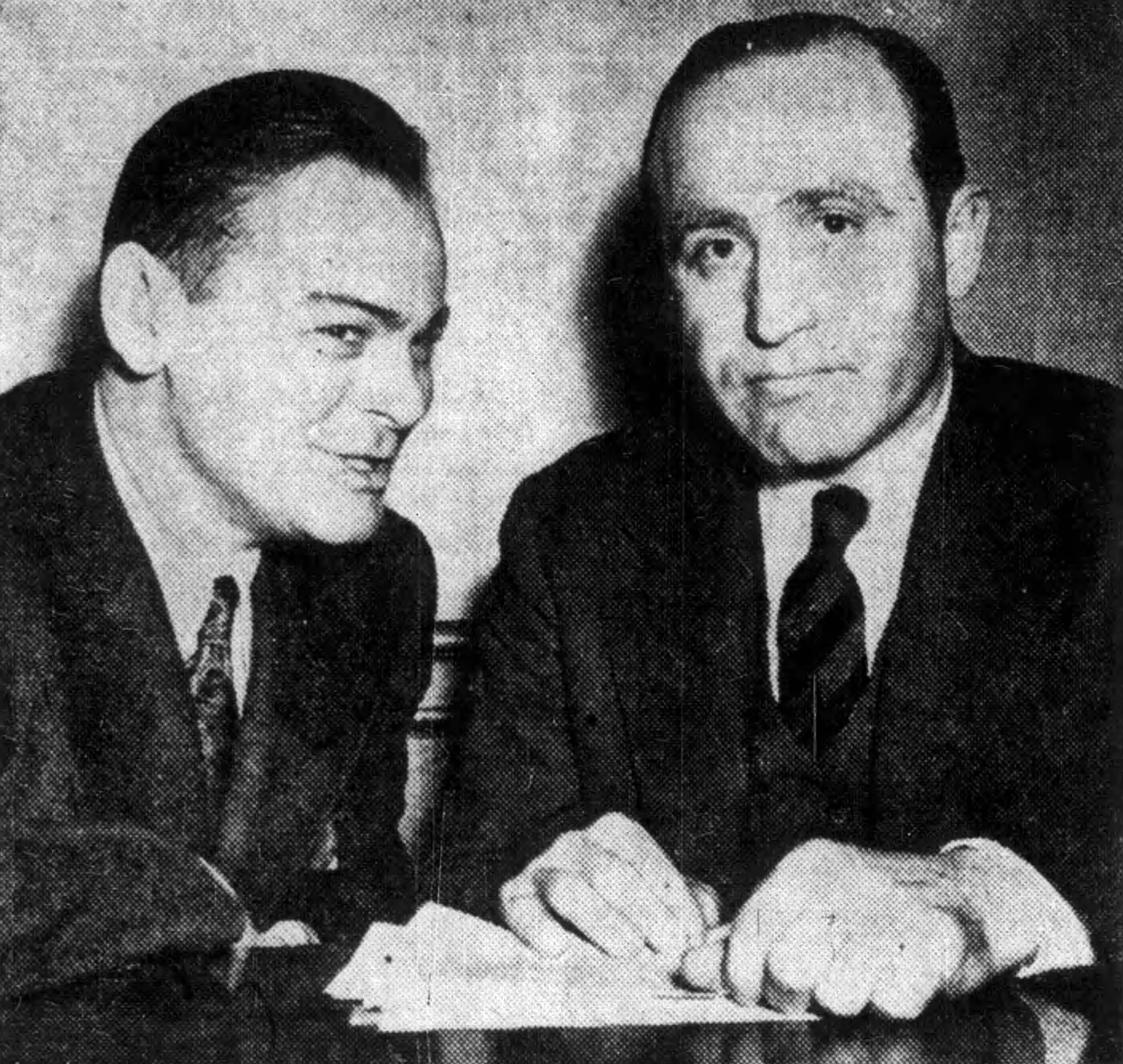
Gold (left) and fellow furriers leader Irving Potash, who were prosecuted under the Sherman Antitrust Act in 1940

Gold was a staunch supporter of CIO President John L. Lewis. In 1940, when other left-wing unions challenged Lewis' handling of CIO finances, Gold defended him. He also applauded Lewis' refusal to endorse Franklin D. Roosevelt in the 1940 presidential election, but unlike Lewis did not endorse Wendell Willkie or Montana Senator Burton K. Wheeler (whom Lewis supported as a third party candidate).

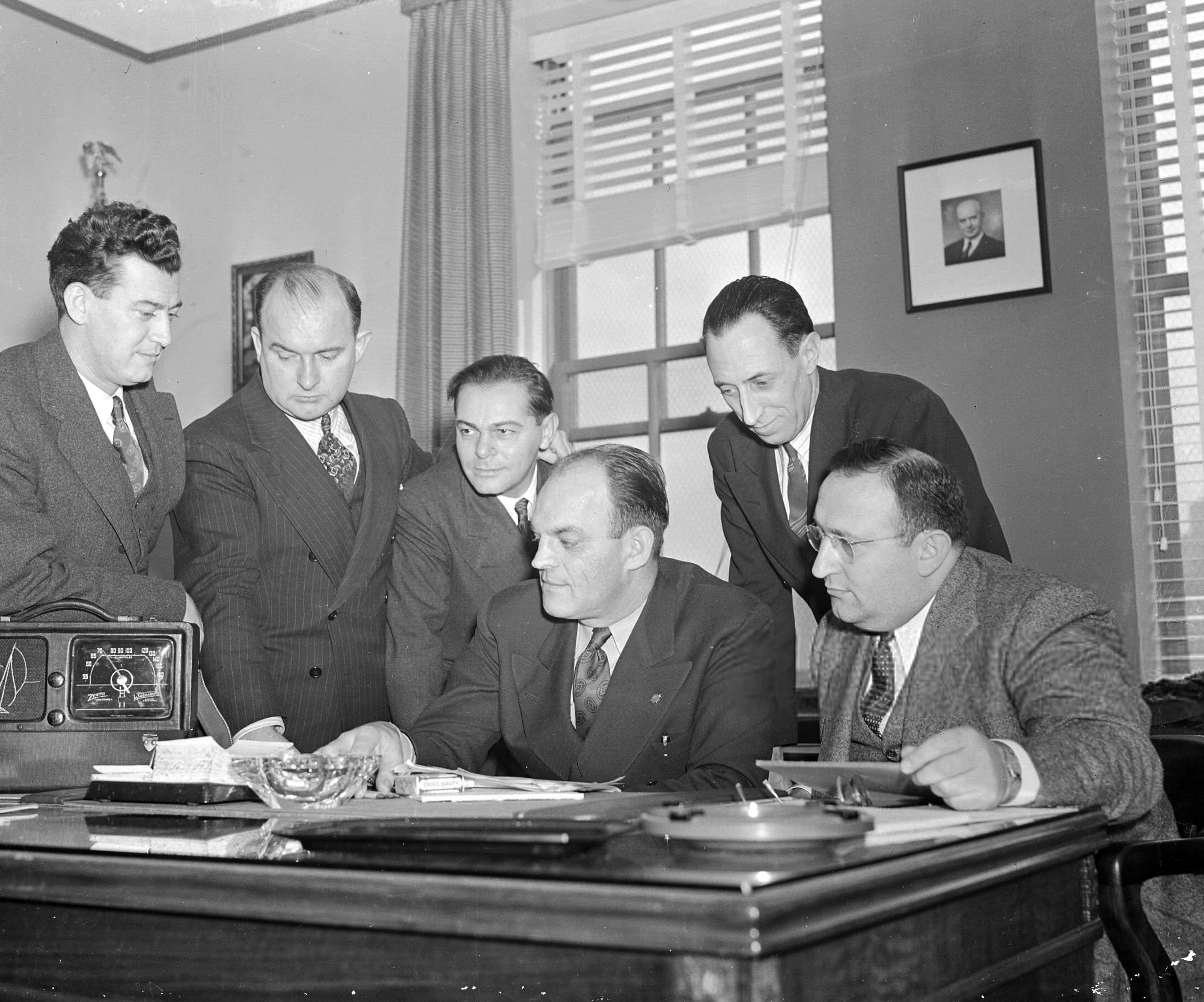
CIO leaders listen to President Roosevelt's Day of Infamy speech before pledging support to the war effort, December 12, 1941 Left to right: Austin Hogan, TWU; Michael Quill, TWU; Ben Gold, IFLWU; Joseph Curran, NMU; Harry Bridges, ILWU, Morris Muster, UFWA

After the United States entered World War II, Gold proved an ardent patriot. As war approached, in November 1941, he led large rallies in New York City urging union members to buy war bonds. When the CIO advocated a no-strike pledge for all American unions, Gold wholeheartedly and strongly supported the pledge. He readily agreed to the seven-day work week after the United States declared war on Nazi Germany and the Empire of Japan, sent aid to the Republic of China, and implemented a campaign to donate 50,000 fur-lined vests to British sailors as part of the war effort.

As the war came to an end, however, Gold began to press for major salary and benefit increases for IFLWU members. Refusing to break the union's no-strike pledge, Gold submitted the union's demands to the National War Labor Board in February 1944. The War Labor Board subsequently granted the union a minimal wage rise in line with its "Little Steel Formula," but granted it substantial fringe benefit increases and ordered employers to end seasonal layoffs. The Board's order was vigorously opposed by employers, and Gold used the dispute as leverage to win a new collective bargaining agreement. The new agreement did not without a price, however, as Gold was forced to threaten to break his union's war-time pledge not to strike.

Gold also strongly advocated a third political party which would more strongly support unions and working-class Americans. Gold first backed a third-party candidate in 1947 when he asked former Vice President Henry A. Wallace to form a third party. In 1948, Soviet leaders ordered American communists to support the third party candidacy of Wallace against incumbent President Harry S. Truman, and Gold actively supported Wallace despite the CIO's refusal to do so.

Gold was a strong supporter of statehood for Israel. He was president of the American Jewish Labor Council in 1948. In March 1948, Gold led a parade of 10,000 people in a parade and rally to support the emerging Jewish state. When American recognition of Israel drew protests in April 1948, Gold defended the Truman administration's actions.

=== Communist purges ===
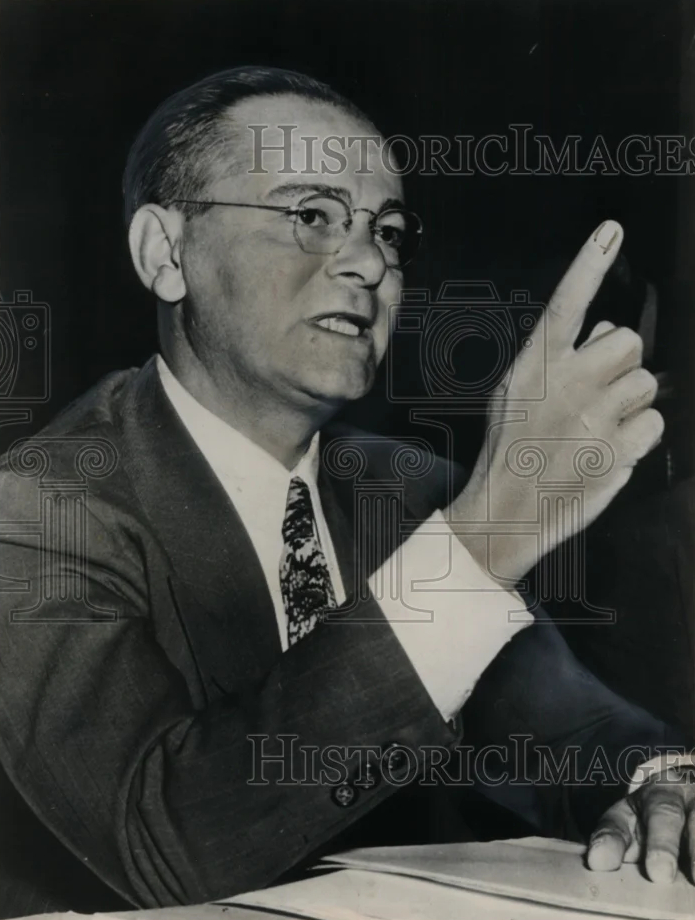
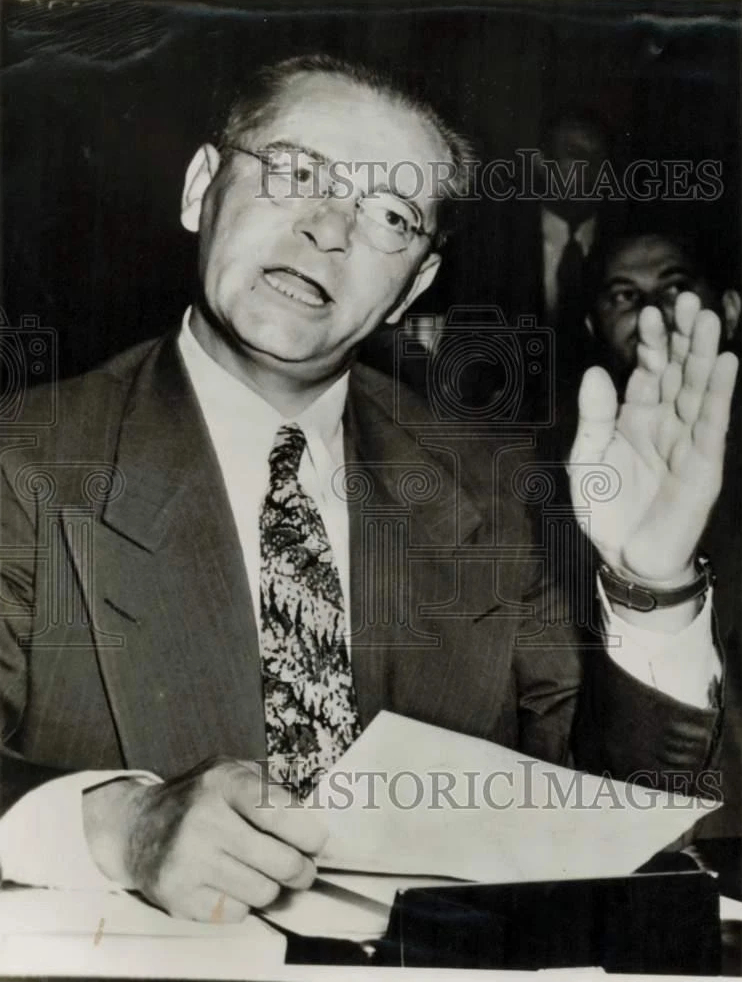
Gold testifies before the House Labor Committee, September 16, 1948

Gold was an active member in the Communist Party, and rose to important positions within its ranks by the late 1940s. He attended the Lenin Institute in Moscow (an institute of higher education which taught the works of Vladimir Lenin) for a short time during the winter of 1930-1931, and was a member of the Central Committee of the Communist Party from 1936 to 1948. His commitment to the party was occasionally tested, but never broken. For example, in 1939, the American Communist Party endorsed the Molotov–Ribbentrop Pact. Gold initially walked out of a party meeting to express his dismay at the decision. He changed his mind a few days later, and followed the party line.

In the post-World War II period, relations between the CIO leadership and communists within its member unions deteriorated. The first sign of a break came in May 1946. CIO President Philip Murray sponsored a denouncing Communist Party interference in the affairs of the CIO. Gold voted to approve the resolution. When asked why, he allegedly replied, "I have no problem being a loyal American, that's all the resolution asks. We just don't agree on the Truman foreign policy. We'll work with anyone on legitimate union business. We can't worry about Jim Carey and Reuther. They have their axes to grind." But when the CIO established a committee in November 1946 to purge the labor federation of communists and communist influence, Gold denounced the effort and said it would "destroy" the CIO. In May 1947, CIO leaders met to discuss the International Union of Mine, Mill, and Smelter Workers, where locals representing thousands of members had recently disaffiliated due to the communist politics of the international union's leadership. CIO President Philip Murray proposed that the CIO run the international union for a time, but Gold and seven other communists voted against Murray's proposal. An outraged Murray declared, "Any man who goes into a shop ostensibly as the representative of the workers and then devotes his time to furthering the interest of the Communist Party is a goddamn traitor. I'm tired of defending Communists and I'm tired of hearing C.I.O. officials defend them. The time has come to kick them out wherever and whenever we find them."

The breach widened throughout 1947. The CIO was extremely supportive of President Truman, and Soviet opposition to the Marshall Plan in the summer and fall of 1947 (opposition supported by most communists in the CIO). This led to a significant rupture between Murray, Walter Reuther and other leaders of the federation on one side and the communist leaders and staff in the CIO member unions on the other. The situation deteriorated further when Soviet leaders ordered American communists to support the Wallace candidacy for president. Then on June 23, 1947, the Republican-controlled Congress passed the Taft–Hartley Act over President Truman's veto. The Act amended the National Labor Relations Act to require union leaders to file affidavits with the Department of Labor declaring that they were not supporters of the Communist Party and had no relationship with any organization seeking the "overthrow of the United States government by force or by any illegal or unconstitutional means" as a condition to participating in NLRB proceedings.

The NLRB acted to aggressively enforce the provisions of the Taft-Hartley Act. Although the level of enforcement was not certain at first, many unions quickly filed the anti-communist affidavits. Gold declared the affidavit and increasingly anti-communist atmosphere a threat to the survival of the IFLWU, and sought contract language which would lock in employer recognition of the union if its leaders failed to sign the oath.

Political pressure on Gold also increased. Rep. John Parnell Thomas, chairman of the House Un-American Activities Committee (HUAC), subpoenaed fur industry employers to testify before the committee about Gold's political beliefs. Their September 8, 1948, testimony blasted Gold for establishing a "dictatorship" within the union and ruining the fur industry through mass picketing and intimidation. HUAC then forced Gold to testify. Gold denounced and denied the testimony of the employers, proudly declaring that he had been a member of the Communist Party for nearly a quarter century.

The CIO subsequently acted to expel Gold and the IFLWU. Over Gold's protests, the CIO expelled the Greater New York CIO Council, of which the IFLWU's Joint Council was a member, in November 1948. Gold began fighting a drive at the national level of the CIO to expel all communist-led or communist-dominated unions. The CIO censured Gold and nine other communists on its Executive Council in May 1949 for allowing the Communist Party to control their unions, and he lost re-election to the CIO Executive Council in November 1949 as the federation's leaders purged itself of all communists. A few days later, the New York State CIO banned communists from being members, and expelled Gold from that body as well.

The attacks on Gold's politics had collective bargaining consequences as well. In August 1949, a tanners' employers' association in Massachusetts refused to bargain with the IFLWU so long as Gold was president of the union, on the grounds that Gold was a communist. The labor dispute with the tanners escalated in late 1949 (leading to some limited violence and vandalism), before a new contract was signed in January 1950.

These pressures took a considerable toll on Gold and the IFLWU. Gold told delegates to the union's convention in May 1950 that the communist political views of the union's leadership could cause the organization much difficulty, yet he also defied the CIO and urged a united union front rather than caving in to redbaiting political pressure.

Nonetheless, the IFLWU agreed to order its leadership to sign the Taft-Hartley Act's non-communist affidavits.

=== Trial for communist beliefs ===
Gold resigned from the Communist Party on August 24, 1950, and signed the Taft-Hartley oath. However, he made it clear that he had resigned only so the Fur Workers could receive the protection of federal law. The Justice Department argued that Gold had not really resigned, and indicted him for perjury in August 1953 one day before the statute of limitations ran out.

At trial, Gold was charged with three counts of perjury. He was accused of continuing to be a member of the Communist Party; accused of being affiliated with Communist party; and accused of being a supporter of an organization which advocated the overthrow of the United States government by force, illegal means, or unconstitutional methods. Numerous famous character witnesses appeared on Gold's behalf, including W. E. B. Du Bois. Nonetheless, Gold was convicted on the "membership" and "supporting" counts, and sentence to 1 to 3 years in prison.

Gold appealed, and his conviction was overturned by the Supreme Court of the United States. Gold raised six grounds for reversal: 1) The trial court refused to apply the rules of evidence for perjury to the case; 2) The circumstantial evidence offered at trial was not sufficient to convict him under the rules of evidence; 3) The trial court's instructions to the jury regarding the definition of "support" were unsupported by law or common usage; 4) The trial court erred in permitting expert testimony regarding his resignation (e.g., the fact of his resignation was a matter for the jury, not expert witnesses, to decide); 5) Government employees on the grand and petit juries were biased (as they themselves had to take an anti-communist oath to retain their jobs); and 6) Law enforcement officers discussed anti-communist oaths with members of the jury while investigating an unrelated case. A deeply divided 2nd Circuit Court of Appeals upheld his conviction. The court of appeals then asked for an en banc rehearing sua sponte. An equally divided en banc court upheld his conviction. Gold appealed to the U.S. Supreme Court, which overturned his conviction in Gold v. United States, 352 U.S. 985 (1957). An FBI agent, investigating another case in which falsity of a non-Communist affidavit was at issue, telephoned or visited three members of the Gold jury or their families during Gold's trial. The Supreme Court held that although the FBI intrusion was unintentional it prejudiced the case against Gold. Relying on its recent decision in Remmer v. United States, 350 U.S. 377 (1955), the Supreme Court reversed and remanded the case to the district court with instructions to grant a new trial.

Although the government initially expressed interest in prosecuting Gold further, all charges against him were dropped in May 1957.

=== Aftereffects of the Gold trials ===
Gold's indictment and conviction led to two other U.S. Supreme Court cases as well.

The first case was a major test of the National Labor Relations Board's (NLRB) enforcement of the Taft-Hartley Act. In 1951, Lannom Manufacturing Co. refused to honor its contract with the International Fur and Leather Workers Union on the grounds that the union's officers had lied when making their Taft-Hartley anti-communist oaths. The union filed an unfair labor practice charge against the employer with the NLRB. The Board found against the employer, but after Gold's conviction in April 1954 it reversed itself. The union, already embroiled in a similar case, asked the 6th Circuit Court of Appeals for a stay; the court declined. The U.S. Supreme Court, however, granted certiorari. In Meat Cutters v. NLRB, 352 U.S. 153 (1956), the Supreme Court (relying on a decision released earlier that day, Leedom v. Mine Workers, 352 U.S. 145) held that the National Labor Relations Board had no authority to refuse to provide the protections of the NLRA to unions not in compliance with the Taft-Hartley Act. "[We] conclude that the sole sanction for the filing of a false affidavit under 9 (h) is the criminal penalty imposed on the officer who files a false affidavit, not decompliance of the union nor the withholding of the benefits of the Act," the court ruled.

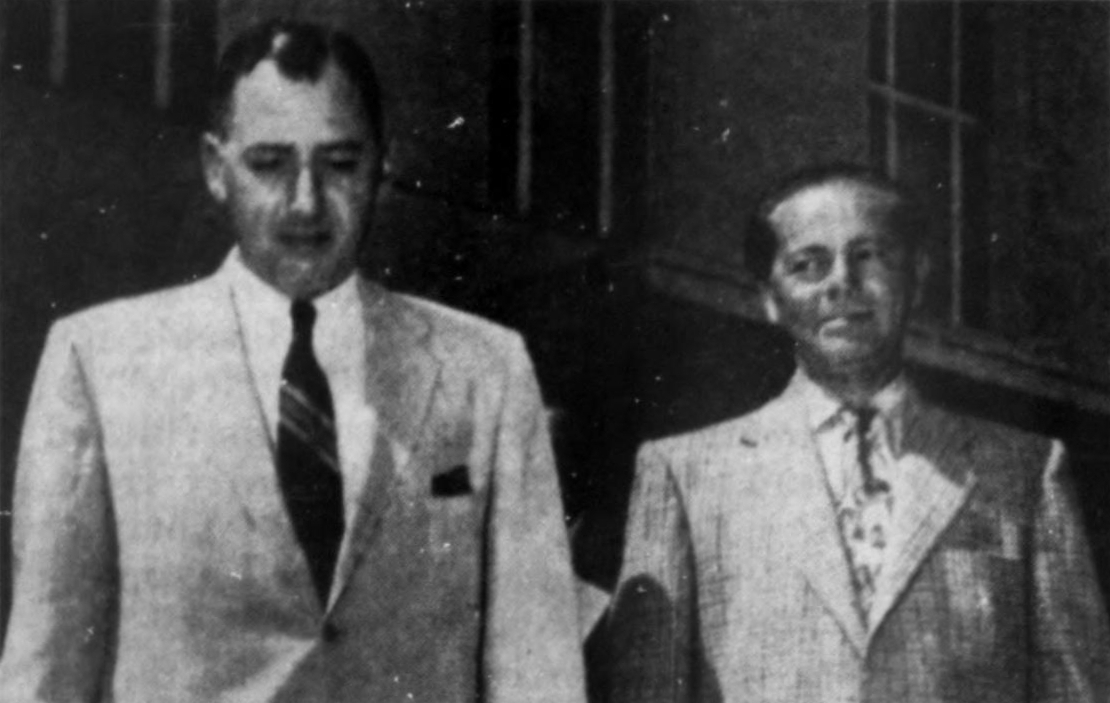
Gold (right ) and his attorney Harold I. Cammer leave the District Court in Washington, D.C. c. October 1953

The second case led to a landmark Supreme Court ruling on whether an attorney was an "officer of the court." After the grand jury had indicted Gold for perjury, Harold I. Cammer (an attorney noted for representing communists in the United States), took Gold's case. Within two days, Cammer mailed a letter and questionnaire to all members of the grand jury who were employees of the federal government. He told the grand jurors that he was Gold's attorney and that he was trying to learn the effect of the federal government's loyalty program on federal employees. Cammer undertook this action because of developments in another Taft-Hartley anti-communist oath case. In Emspak v. United States, 203 F.2d 54 (1952), the Justice Department convinced a district court that grand jurors who were federal employee were not biased. In particular, the government had argued that "there is not the slightest indication in the long motion and offer of proof that an attempt has been made to interview a single one of the persons." To prevent the government from making a similar claim in the Gold case, Cammer polled the jury. The Contempt Act of March 2, 1831 (4 Stat. 487) gave federal courts the authority to penalize officers of the court for misbehavior. For questioning the grand jurors, the district court found Cammer guilty of contempt and fined him $100. Cammer appealed. The D.C. Circuit Court of Appeals upheld his conviction. Cammer appealed to the U.S. Supreme Court, which granted certiorari. In a landmark ruling, a unanimous Supreme Court overturned Cammer's contempt citation, holding that a lawyer is not a court "officer" in the same category as marshals, bailiffs, court clerks or judges. The district court erred in subjecting Cammer to summary punishment, the Supreme Court concluded, and the high court order the contempt ruling reversed.

== Merger with the Meat Cutters and retirement ==
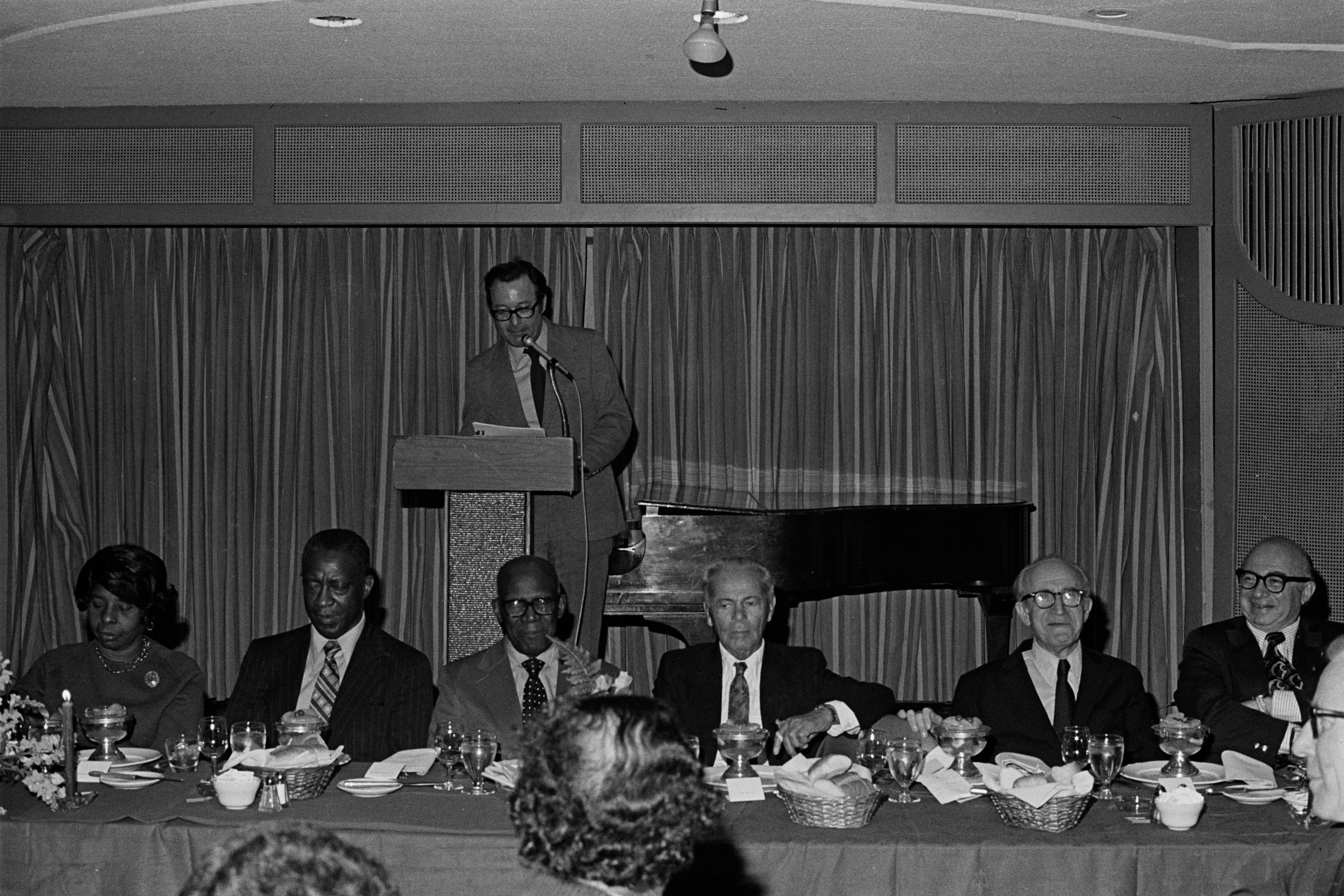
Gold (third from right) at a birthday dinner for Irving Potash (second from right) at Tavern on the Green in New York City, November 16, 1972

Gold was re-elected as IFLWU president in May 1954 despite his conviction for perjury. But the problems created by the Taft-Hartley Act, expulsion from the CIO, and prosecutions of the IFLWU's top leadership led Gold to seek merger with another union to strengthen the union's finances and collective bargaining power. A month after his re-election, Gold announced that he was discussing merger with the Amalgamated Meat Cutters and Butcher Workmen of North America, a labor union affiliated with the AFL that represented retail butchers and packinghouse workers. AFL leaders, however, expressed strong reservation against bringing the "Red-led" union into the federation.

Although the merger talks had moved forward aggressively, Ben Gold retired as IFLWU president on October 3, 1954, in order to remove AFL objections to the merger.

Gold's resignation at age 56 proved crucial in winning AFL approval for the merger. A new effort to merge the IFLWU and Meat Cutters began the day after his retirement. Eventually, the merger was consummated in 1955 after the AFL announced it would bar the IFLWU from joining the federation directly but not from merging with an AFL affiliate. The fur workers' division underwent additional purges of communist leaders and members after the merger.

Ben Gold spent the rest of his life in Florida. He published his memoirs in 1984. He died on July 24, 1985, at his home in North Miami Beach, Florida.

== Political career ==
At the height of his career as a labor leader, Gold resided in the Bronx, where he ran unsuccessfully for public office on several occasions. He was the Workers Party candidate for Congress in New York's 23rd district in 1928. He then ran for New York State Assembly on the Communist Party ticket in 1930, 1931, 1934 and 1936, as well as for justice of the New York Supreme Court in 1932 and president of the New York City Board of Aldermen in 1933. His best showing was his 1934 Assembly race, where he earned almost 10% of the vote.

== In literature ==
Throughout his life, Gold wrote short stories in Yiddish that often dealt with labor relations and Jewish immigrants. His 1944 novel Avreml Broide included illustrations by fellow communist William Gropper. In 1948, he wrote Mentshn, published by the Needle Trades Workers Committee. His last work of fiction was The Storm in Riverville, published in 1972. It is a semi-fictional account of garment workers in the 1920s, their fight against organized crime, and their attempt to win a 40-hour work week.

Gold himself appears as a character in the fiction novel Union Square. The book, published in 2001, is about two Russian Jewish families—one Marxist, the other socialist—who are forced by pogroms to flee to the United States. Sarah Levy, one of the most prominent characters in the novel, meets a slightly fictionalized Ben Gold in her attempt to unionize women garment workers in New York City.

Gold also appears as a character in the stage play I'm Not Rappaport. Actor Ron Rifkin played Gold in the film version of the play.

== Works ==
- Who Are the Murderers? Who Paid for Placing the Bomb that Killed Morris Langer? The Ring of Racketeers in the Fur Industry Exposed. New York, General Executive Board, Needle Trades Workers Industrial Union, 1933.
- Avreml Broide. New York: Prompt Press, 1944. —In Yiddish.
- The Palestine Crisis: An Open Letter to the Interim Committee, American Jewish Conference. with Alex Bittelman New York: Morning Freiheit Association, 1946.
- People. Illustrations by William Gropper. New York: Guild Trades, 1948. —In Yiddish.
- Lucky Jim. New York: Ben Gold Book Committee, 1968. —In Yiddish.
- In Those Days. New York: Ben Gold Book Committee, 1970. —In Yiddish.
- The Storm in Riverville. New York: Ben Gold Book Committee, 1973. —In Yiddish.
- Memoirs. New York: W. Howard, 1984.
