= Alvin F. Grospiron =

American labor leader (1916-1985)

Alvin F. Grospiron (April 17, 1916 – January 1985) was an American labor leader who served as president of Oil, Chemical and Atomic Workers International Union (OCAW) from 1965 to 1979.

Grospiron started as an oil refinery worker on the Texas Gulf Coast, before becoming secretary-treasurer of his local union. In 1959-60 he led a six-month strike at American Oil's Texas City Refinery. At the 1961 OCAW convention Grospiron was elected to the union's executive board as representative for District 4, which covered the Gulf Coast. In 1963 he was elected secretary-treasurer of the international union, replacing Tom McCormick, who had died. In August 1965 Grospiron was elected president of the OCAW, replacing the retiring O. A. Knight, who had led the union since its founding merger in 1955. Grospiron retired in 1979, and was succeeded by Robert Goss.

His work landed him on the master list of Nixon's political opponents.

Trade union offices
Preceded by Jack Knight	President of the Oil, Chemical, and Atomic Workers International Union; 1965–1979	Succeeded by Robert F. Goss
