= David Rein =

20th-century American lawyer

- Born: 1914; New York City
- Died: August 15, 1979 (aged 65)
- Education: Columbia College
- Alma mater: Columbia Law School
- Occupation: Lawyer
- Years active: 1930s-1970s
- Employer(s): Forer & Rein; Rein, Garfinkel & Dranitske
- Organization: National Lawyers Guild
- Spouse: Selma Rein

David Rein (1914–1979) was a 20th-Century American attorney who, with partner Joseph Forer, supported Progressive causes including the legal defense of African-Americans and accused Communists. Rein and Foyer were members of the National Lawyers Guild and its D.C. chapter. Rein represented "more than 100 people", alleged to have been Communists, before the House Un-American Activities Committee (HUAC) and the subcommittee of the Senate Committee on Administration (chaired by U.S. Senator Joseph R. McCarthy).

== Background ==
David Rein was born on April 12, 1914, in New York City. He attended public elementary and high schools there. He studied at Columbia College and Columbia Law School. He had two siblings.

== Career ==
In July 1935, directly out of law school, Rein joined the New York City Charter Commission and then the Puerto Rico Reconstruction Administration through 1937, based out of Washington, D.C., and San Juan, Puerto Rico. He then worked briefly again in New York.

=== National Labor Relations Board ===
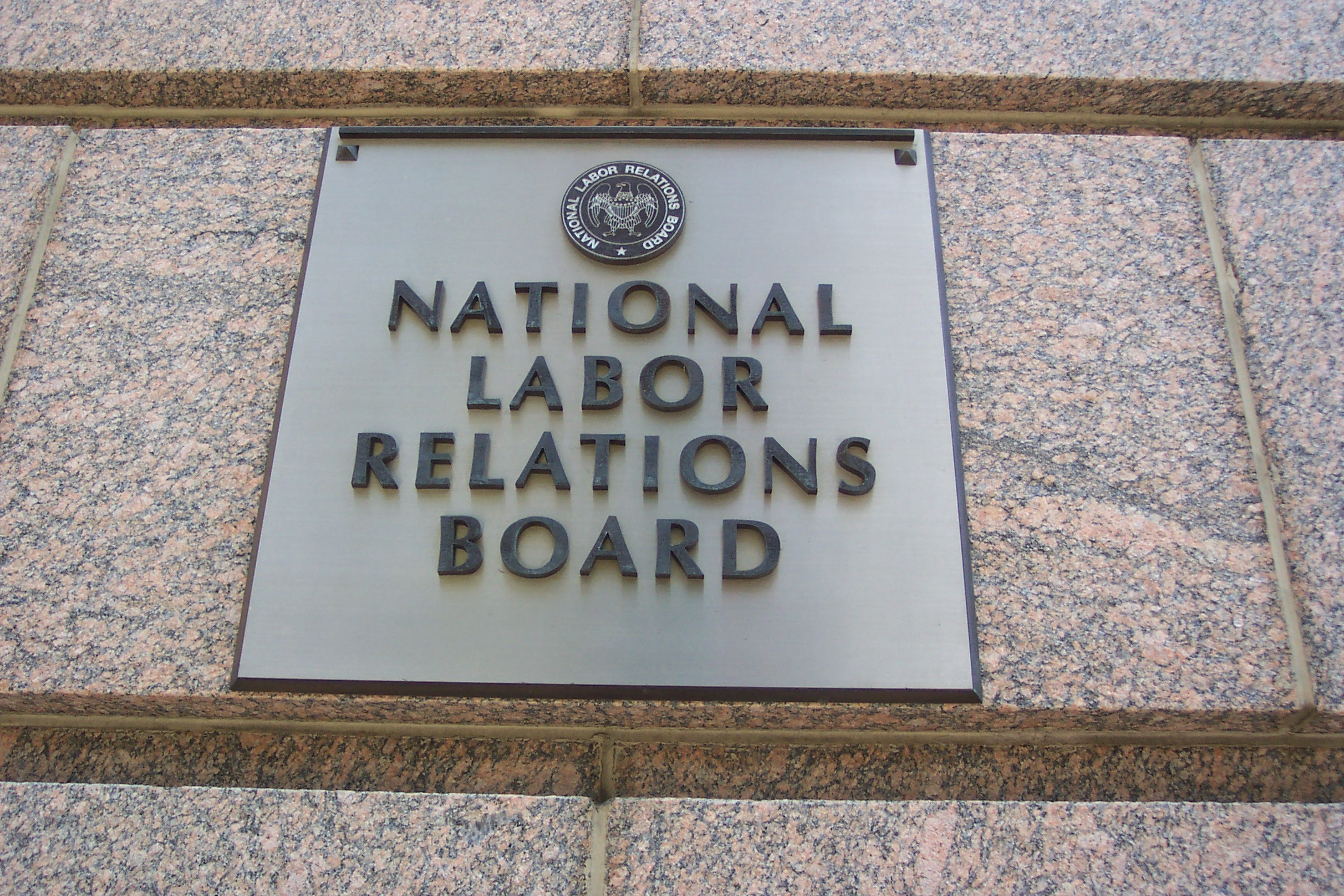
Plaque outside 1099 14th Street NW in Washington, D.C., the NLRB HW (2013), where Rein worked in the 1930s

In March 1938, like his friend Forer, Rein began work for the National Labor Relations Board (NLRB) through late 1941 or early 1942. After spending a few months in the Office of Price Administration, he joined the United States Marine Corps at yearend 1942 and served through October 1945, when he returned to the NLRB.

=== Forer & Rein ===
In mid-year 1946, David Rein joined Joseph Forer as private practice law partners in Washington, D.C. Together, they "represented more than 100 persons who had been termed 'unfriendly' witnesses by the House Committee on Un-American Activities, the Senate Internal Security Subcommittee of the Senate subcommittee headed by the late senator Joseph McCarthy."

As historian Joan Quigley describes:

In the late 1940s, while Congress and the executive branch trawled for evidence of disloyalty and subversion, Rein and Forer immersed themselves in difficult and disfavored causes: opposing the Mundt-Nixon Bill; defending labor unions and alleged Communists; upholding the Bill of Rights. Rein ... represented Gerhard Eisler ... As progressives and New Deal veterans, Forer and Rein also nurtured ties to the National Lawyers Guild, which HUAC had branded a Communist front in 1944.

Attorney Victor Rabinowitz recalled in his memoir that Rein's circle of communist-supportive lawyers stretched to New York City (headquarters of the National Lawyers Guild). They included Harry Sacher, Abe Unger, David Freeman, Forer, and Rabinowitz himself, "all lawyers active in the representation of witnesses before congressional committees." He explained:

Unger and Freeman were attorneys for the (Communist) Party; Sacher had been lead defense in the prosecution of Communist party leaders under the Smith Act; I was a member of the Party and the others were close to it if not members. We certainly weren't making Party policy, but our views would have some influence on the Party and its members.

=== Lost Laws and DC v. John R. Thompson Co. ===
==== Mary Church Terrell ====
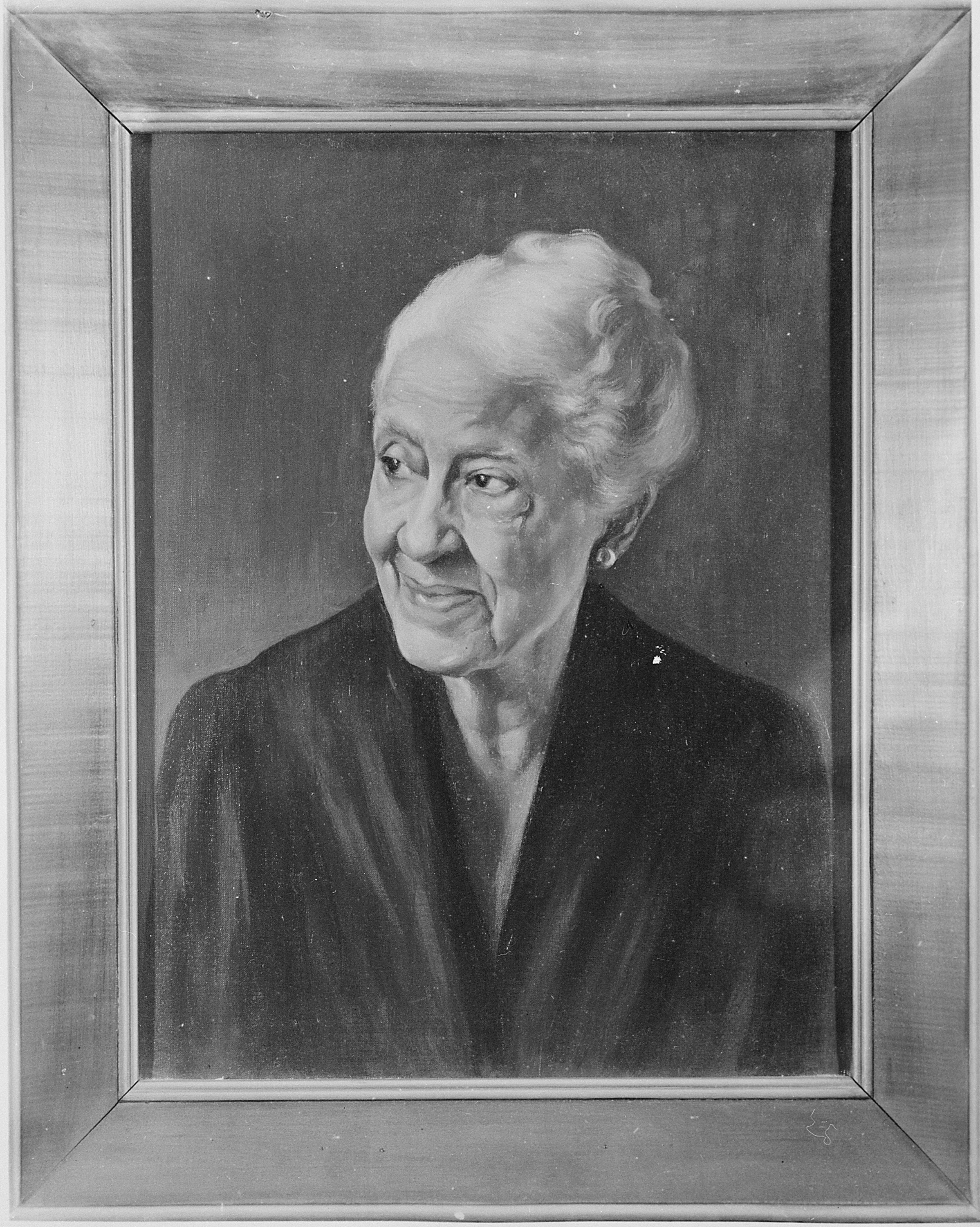
Painting of Mary Church Terrell by Betsy Graves Reyneau, 1888–1964

In May 1949, Dr. Mary Church Terrell decided to take on the issue of desegregation head-on. She consulted Forer. Forer led the National Lawyers Guild's DC chapter in submitting an opinion in their favor. With such advice, Dr. Terrell and colleagues Clark F. King, Essie Thompson, and Arthur F. Elmer entered the segregated Thompson's Restaurant, next door to the offices of Forer and Rein's office at 711 14th Street NW, in Washington, D.C., between H and G Streets cut by New York Avenue and across the street from the Trans-Lux Theatre. When refused service, Terrell & Co. sued.

Attorney Ringgold Hart, representing Thompson, argued on April 1, 1950, that District laws were unconstitutional. Regardless, Forer's research found that the U.S. Congress had jurisdiction over DC and so could overrule segregation; Charles H. Houston, dean of Howard University Law School concurred.

==== District of Columbia v. John R. Thompson Co. ====
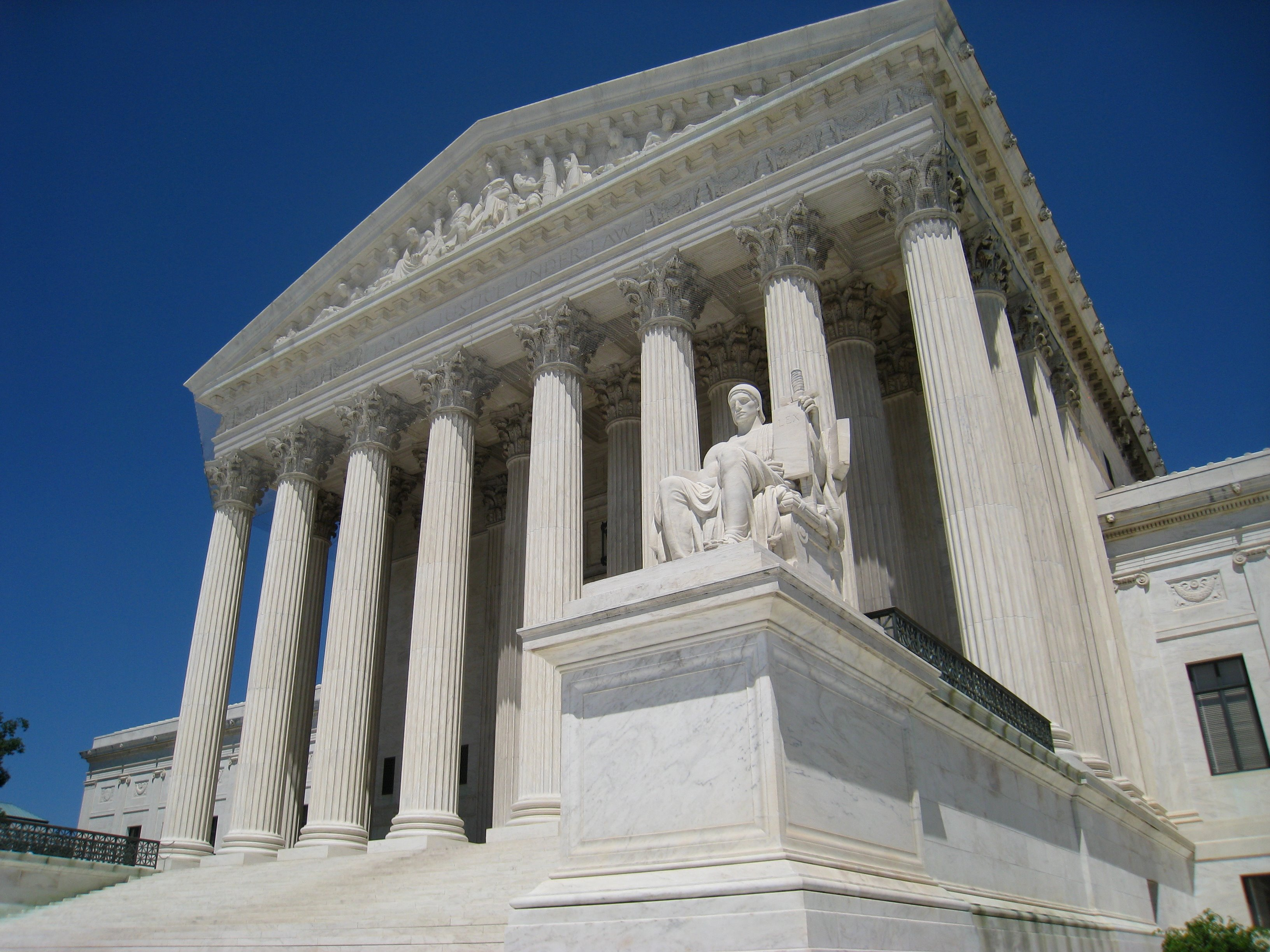
Supreme Court of the United States

The case District of Columbia v. John R. Thompson Co. reached the U.S. Supreme Court. Forer and Rein argued the case. On June 8, 1953, the court ruled that segregated eating places in Washington, D.C., were unconstitutional.

The Washington Post recounted in 1985, "Four days after the Supreme Court ruled, Mary Terrell and the three other original complainants went back to Thompson's. Joe Forer followed them in. As he recalls the moment, the manager, himself, came over and personally, even obsequiously, carried Mary Terrell's tray to the table."

=== Major cases ===
As a civil liberties lawyer, Rein argued cases before the United States Supreme Court, including some major cases involving First Amendment rights, include:

- 1951: Joint Anti-Fascist Refugee Committee v. McGrath
- 1952: Harisiades v. Shaughnessy
- 1967: W.E.B. DuBois Clubs of America v. Clark
- 1976: Secretary of the Navy v. Avrech

=== Other cases ===
Forer & Rein represented communists including Gerhart Eisler and William Gropper. They argued for the rights of striking workers, foreign-born aliens (with leftist leanings, e.g., Eisler), and servicemen. They won for the National Council for American-Soviet Friendship the right to contest in court its designation by the attorney general as a "subversive organization." They also represented members of the press on strike against The Washington Post in 1975.

In 1955, Rein and his wife testified before HUAC but refused to answer questions as to communist affiliation.

=== FBI target ===
In 1977, a release of internal memos of the FBI revealed, according to The Washington Post, that:

An Oct. 4, 1951 memo to Hoover said that a search of trash at the Washington offices of guild lawyers Joseph Forer and David Rein had uncovered a draft resolution urging President Truman to authorize a citizens' investigation of the FBI because of its alleged excesses in loyalty checks.

=== Retirement ===
When Forer retired from practice with Rein in July 1978, Rein reformed the practice as Rein, Garfinkel & Dranitske. Presently, the firm is Liotta, Dranitzke & Engel.

== Personal and death ==
Rein was married to Selma Rein; they had one child.

Forer, Rein, and many friends and associates lived at Trenton Terrace, 950 Mississippi Avenue SE, Washington DC 20032.

As a child, Carl Bernstein knew Joseph Forer and David Rein.

Rein died age 65 on August 15, 1979, while playing tennis near his home in Washington, DC.

== See also ==
- Joseph Forer
- Mary Church Terrell
- Charles H. Houston
- Mundt-Nixon Bill
- Gerhard Eisler
- HUAC
- National Lawyers Guild

== External sources ==
- "Forer and Rein (Washington, D.C.)". WorldCat OCLC Identities. 2010.
- VitoAntonio.com: Image of Joseph Forer with John Abt and Vito Marcantonio
