= Spying on Democracy =

Spying on Democracy: Government Surveillance, Corporate Power, and Public Resistance
- Spying on Democracy cover, first edition
- Author: Heidi Boghosian
- Language: English
- Subject: current affairs, politics, social science, surveillance, technology
- Genre: non-fiction
- Publisher: City Lights Publishers
- Publication date: August 2013
- Publication place: United States
- Pages: 120
- ISBN: 978-0-87286-599-0

Spying on Democracy: Government Surveillance, Corporate Power, and Public Resistance is a book by Heidi Boghosian, executive director of the National Lawyers Guild, and co-host of Pacifica's WBAI weekly civil liberties radio program, "Law and Disorder." The book details the growing amount of surveillance of everyday citizens, and what this means for society. It is published by City Lights Publishers in the Open Media Series.

== Themes ==
Spying on Democracy focuses mainly on the theme of confidentiality. Boghosian describes the many ways that the government acquires personal information, whether it be from telecommunications companies, or video surveillance cameras.

Other themes discussed include control, technology, and civil liberties. Why does the government need all of this information? Boghosian discusses how technology is used to categorize and monitor people based on their everyday activities. People are categorized by the associations, purchases, and perceived political beliefs. The government then takes this data and creates databases about "persons of interest." Spying on Democracy calls into question the meaning of civil liberties during a time of constant surveillance.

Most of Boghosian's work discusses the topic of government surveillance that is described in Spying on Democracy. In 2012, Boghosian documented her own data trail in order to demonstrate how everyday transactions and ventures are documented. In an article in the New York Times Boghosian attempted to show her point that corporations play a larger role in people's daily lives than realized.

== Reception ==
Publishers Weekly gave the book a positive review, referring to it as a "well-researched dossier", and concluding that it is "an informative read for parents, students, and activists, especially those interested in the implications of technology in today's society".

== See also ==
- corporate power
- government surveillance
- public resistance
- Surveillance capitalism
