= Ferdinand Smith =

Jamaican-born American Communist labor activist

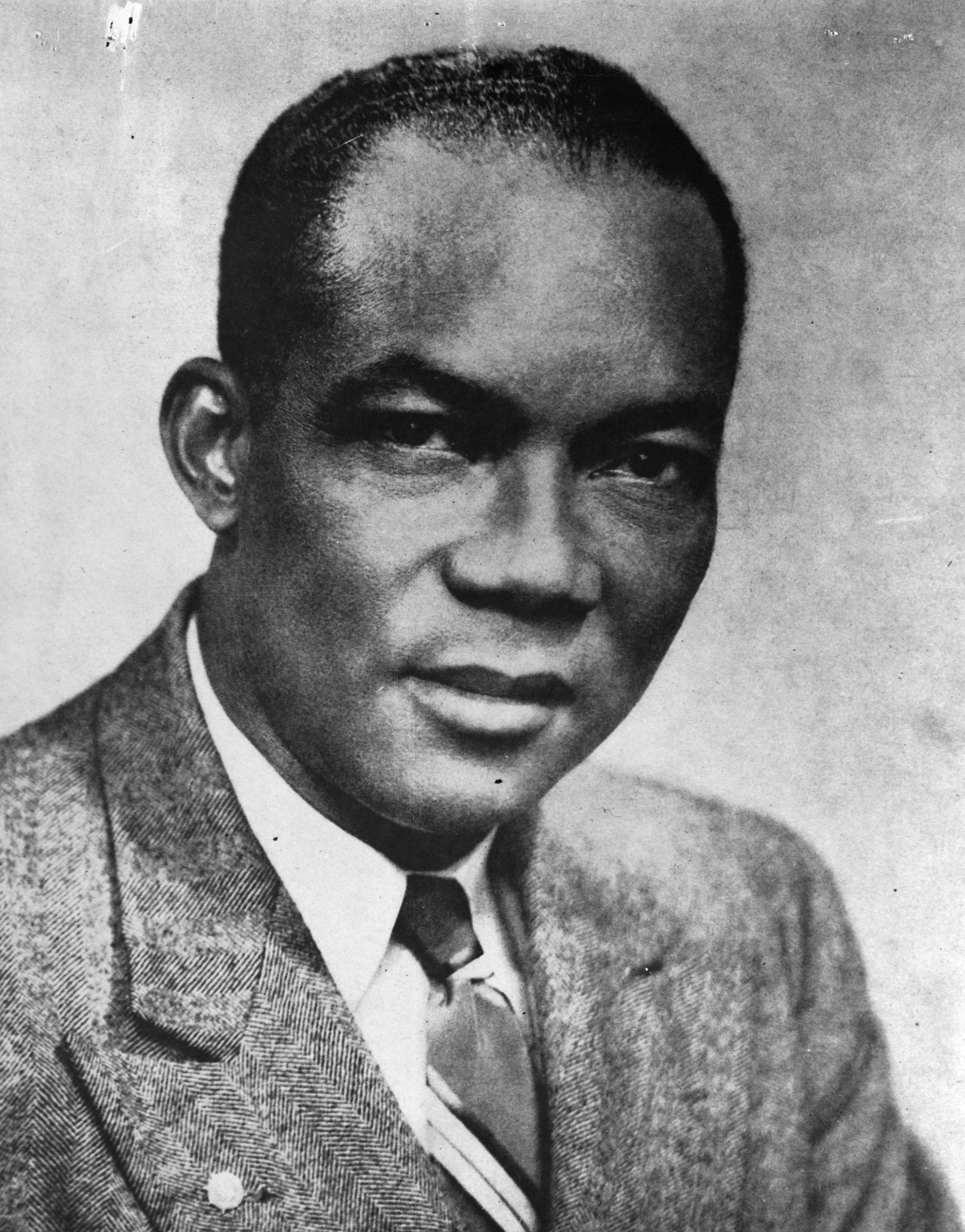
Smith c. 1944

Ferdinand Christopher Smith (5 May 1893 – 14 August 1961) was a Jamaican-born communist labor activist. A prominent activist in the United States and the West Indies, Smith co-founded the National Maritime Union with Joseph Curran and M. Hedley Stone. By 1948 he was wanted by the U.S. Immigration Service for deportation, and is remembered as one of the most powerful black labor leaders in U.S. history.

== Early life ==
Ferdinand Christopher Smith was born on May 5, 1893, in Savanna-la-Mar in Westmoreland Parish, Jamaica. His father was a teacher.

== Career ==
=== Early years ===
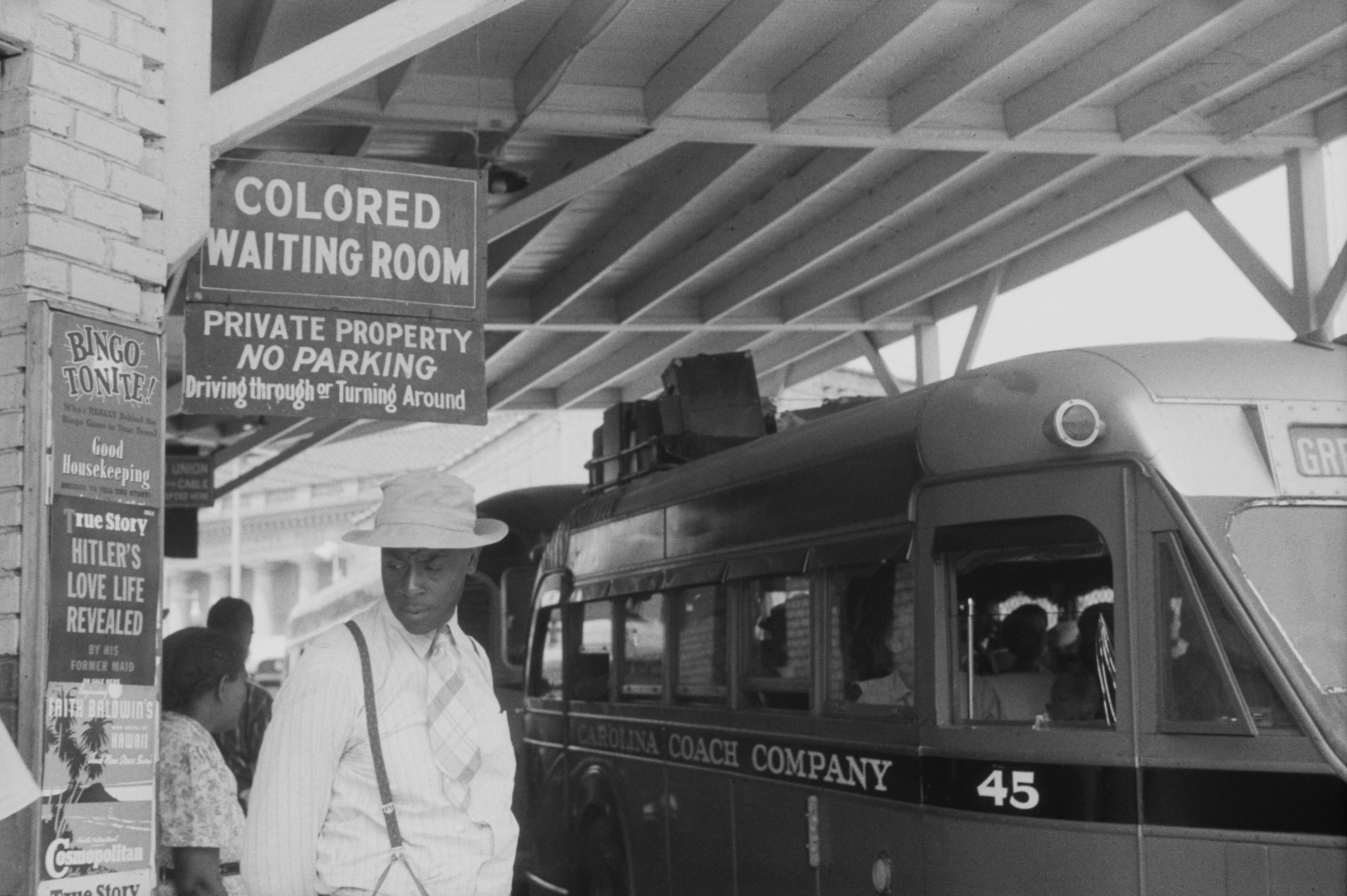
Jim Crow sign for "colored" waiting room at bus station in Durham, North Carolina (1940)

Smith was first a laborer (porter), then waiter in a local hotel. He left to live in Panama, where he worked as hotel steward and salesman; he first experienced Jim Crow conditions. At the end of World War I, he left to live in Cuba as a migrant laborer. He left Cuba for Mobile, Alabama, as a sailor. He worked for two decades as a ship's steward.

During the 1920s, he joined the CPUSA-created Marine Workers Industrial Union (MWIU). In 1936, he supported the 1936 Gulf Coast maritime workers' strike and joined its national committee.

=== NMU ===
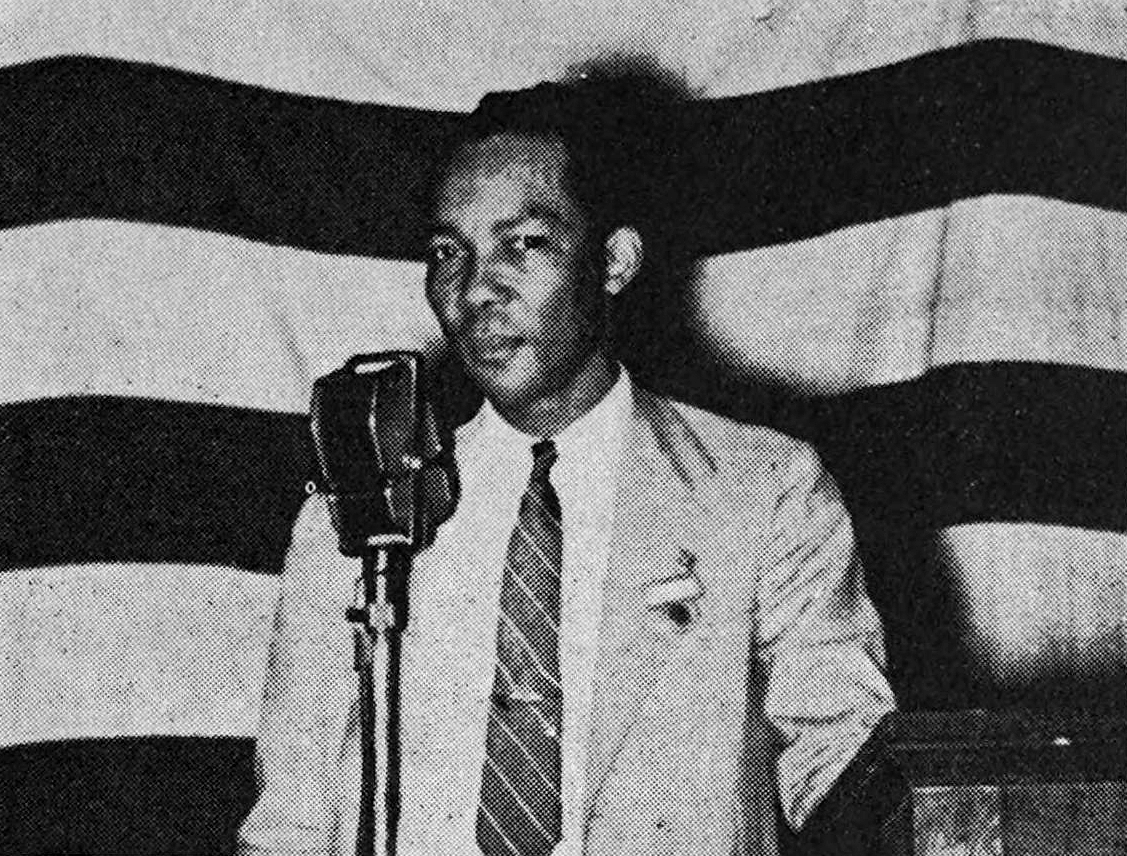
Smith c. 1938

In 1937, Smith emerged as vice president during the formation of the National Maritime Union, which itself reflected a rise in union activism among seamen in the wake of the 1933 Scottsboro Boys case and the 1934 West Coast waterfront strike (led by Harry Bridges's International Longshoremen's and Warehousemen's Union or ILWU and the West Coast Marine Cooks and Stewards or MCS), following the demise of the International Seamen's Union (ISU) and the decline of the Industrial Workers of the World (IWW or "Wobblies") in the 1920s. Ironically, Smith's name came to the fore because he was tried internally by an NMU committee for failing to support the 1934 strike but later cleared the union.

Smith supported non-discrimination. He pushed through a non-discrimination plank in the NMU constitution. In 1944, he had a non-discrimination pledge added to contracts with more than 100 ship companies. He supported civil rights more broadly by partaking in the National Negro Congress and Negro Labor Victory Committee.

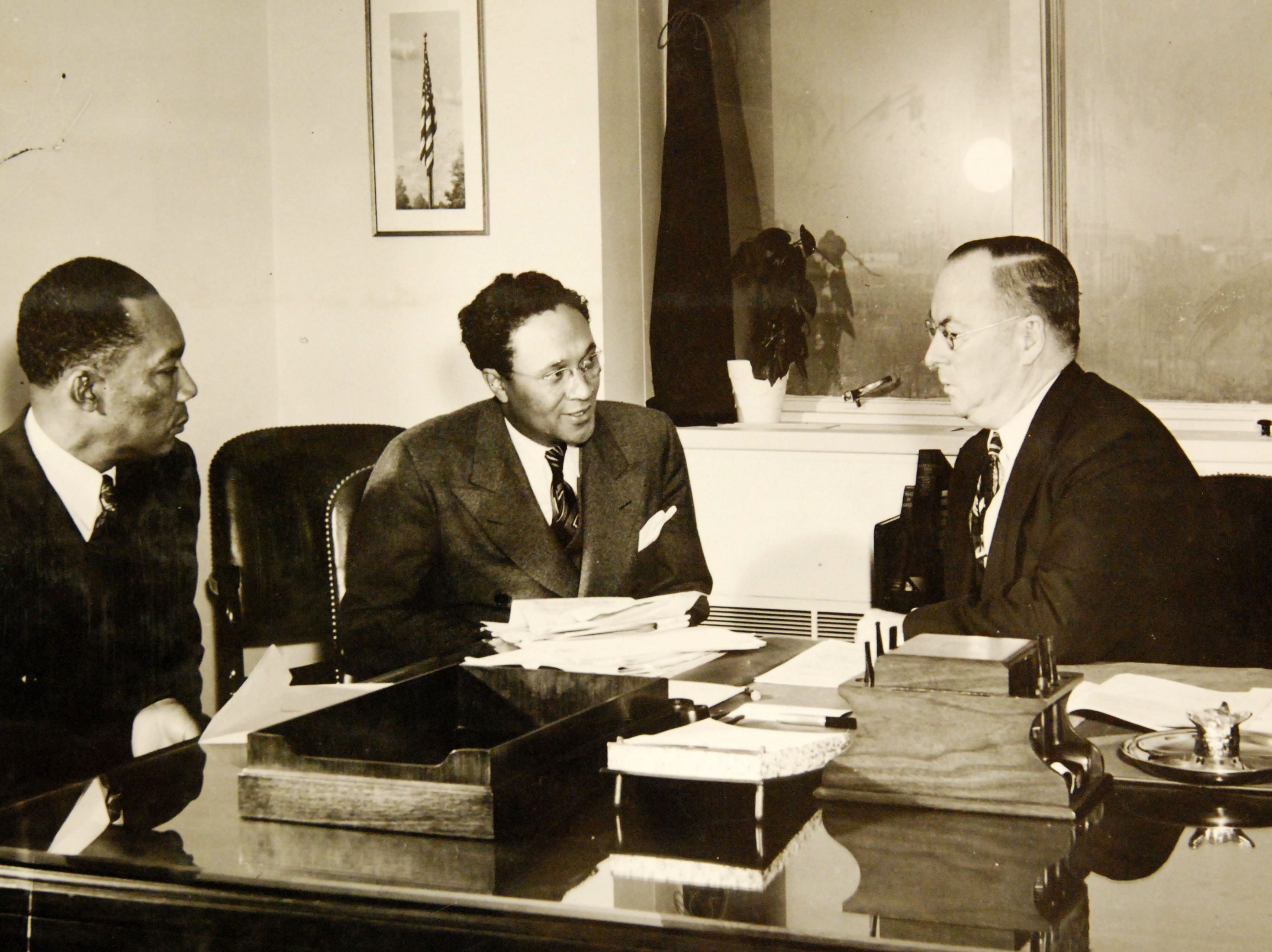
Smith (left) and Chicago Alderman Earl Dickerson (center) meeting with War Production Board Chairman Donald Nelson to promote African-American man-power in war production c. 1942–1945

During World War II, Smith joined Chicago Alderman Earl B. Dickerson to meet with Donald M. Nelson, Chair of the War Production Board.

In 1943, during a race riot in Harlem, local and federal officials asked Smith to come help ease tensions. He was also involved with maritime unions in the Caribbean and South Atlantic.

In 1944, Smith had at least one major speech written for him by Frank Marshall Davis during the presidential campaign of Franklin Delano Roosevelt.

Also in 1944, it became public knowledge that Smith had British, not American citizenship.

In 1945, he resigned as vice president and left the country. He soon re-entered as a legal immigrant and became NMU secretary. In 1948, the NMU expelled Smith, Paul Palazzi, and Howard McKenzie for misuse of union funds. Also in 1945, the NMU gave more money than any other union for the re-election of Benjamin J. Davis, Jr. for New York City Council.

=== Deportation ===
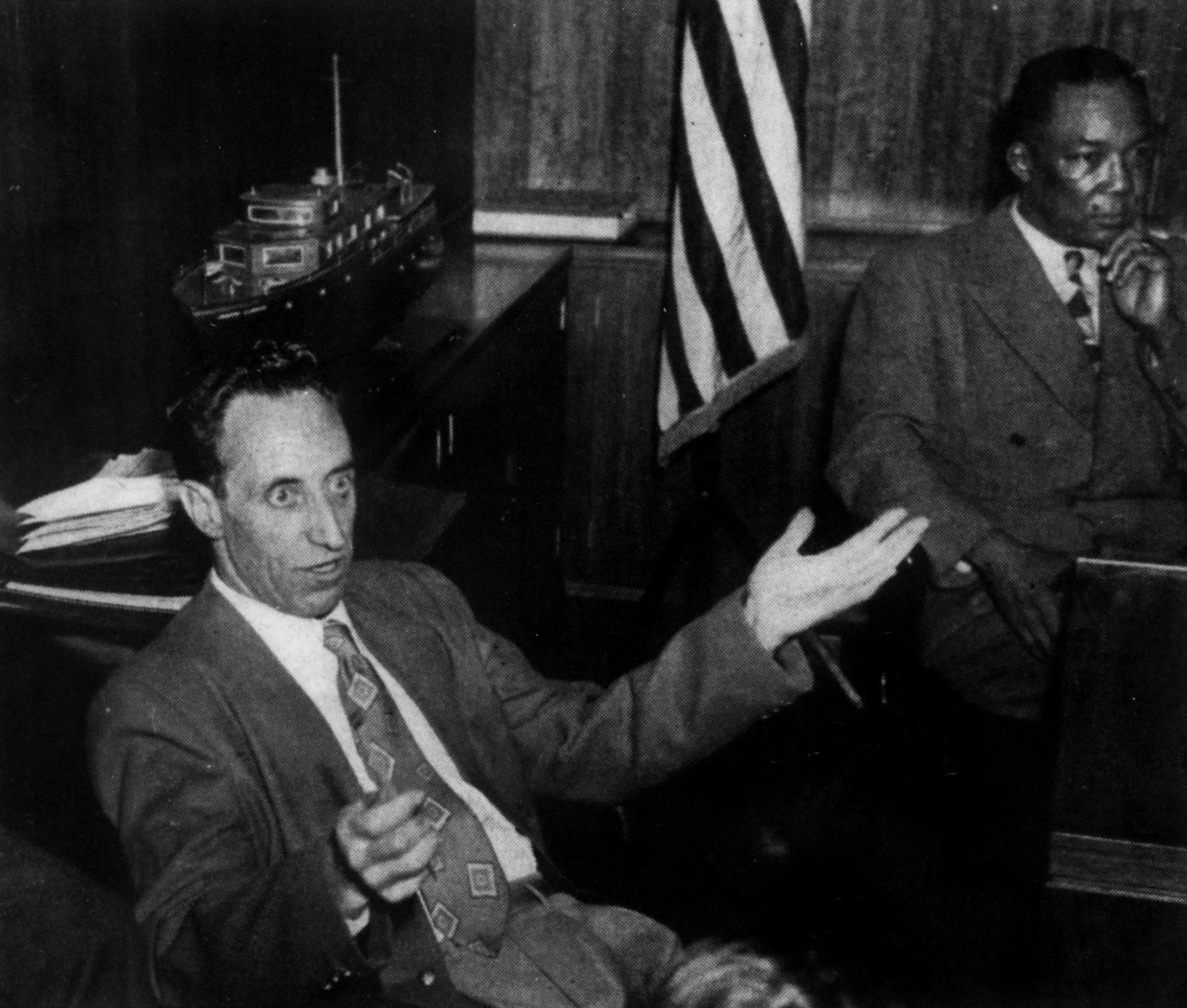
Smith and International Longshore and Warehouse Union president Harry Bridges c. 1948

In early 1948, NMU president Joe Curran bowed to pressure and fired known communists from the NMU, including Smith.

In February 1948, U.S. Immigration arrested Smith as an illegal alien. In March 1948, Smith found himself lumped into a group of Communist Party and labor leaders headed for deportation. Lee Pressman, who had just left the CIO as general counsel, joined a group of lawyers to defend them. Pressman represented all five, at least some of whom had their own attorneys: alleged Soviet spy Gerhart Eisler (represented by Abraham J. Isserman), Irving Potash of the Fur and Leather Workers Union; Smith, secretary of the NMUM (Pressman); Charles A. Doyle of the Gas, Coke and Chemical Workers Union (Isadore Englander), and CPUSA labor secretary John Williamson (Carol Weiss King). Pressman went on to join Joseph Forer, a Washington-based attorney, in representing the five before the U.S. Supreme Court.

In April 1948, Pete Seeger participated in a benefit concert for Smith's defense. By that time, according to congressional hearings in 1955, Smith was no longer vice president.

On May 5, 1948, Pressman and Forer received a preliminary injunction so their defendants might have hearings with examiners unconnected with the investigations and prosecutions by examiners of the Immigration and Naturalization Service. (All attorneys were members of the National Lawyers Guild.)

=== Last years ===
Smith was deported. He went to live in Vienna, Austria, where he worked for the World Federation of Trade Unions (WFTU). In 1951 (or 1952), Smith found himself deported to Jamaica. He remained involved in union activism by organizing sugar works and led a union federation until his death in 1961.

== Personal and death ==
Benjamin J. Davis, Jr. was a close friend of Smith's.

Smith died on August 14, 1961, in Jamaica.

== Legacy ==
In the 1943 mural The Contribution of the Negro to Democracy in America by African-American artist Charles Wilbert White, Smith appears among Peter Salem, Nat Turner Denmark Vesey, Peter Still, Harriet Tubman, Frederick Douglass, Booker T. Washington, George Washington Carver, Marian Anderson, Paul Robeson, and Lead Belly. "By placing Smith in the Contribution mural, White suggests the importance of organized labor to the collective uplift of African American communities, particularly given that the CIO was steadily gaining ground in the battle to eliminate long-standing patterns of racial exclusion within the American labor movement."

Historian Peter Cole has assessed:

Through his position at the NMU, he gave money and spoke out on many issues: the racist hiring practices of New York City employers, the election of the black Communist Ben Davis to the NYC city council, the effort to oust notoriously racist senator Theodore Bilbo of Mississippi, etc. Other struggles were anticolonial—as when he pushed for the independence of Puerto Rico, the Philippines, India, South Africa, and Ghana. In 1944, Smith was one of the most prominent labor or black leaders campaigning for Franklin Delano Roosevelt until being "red-baited." Smith embodied the ideal of the sailor as a working-class intellectual and cosmopolitan internationalist.
