= Wesley Lowery =

American journalist (born 1990)

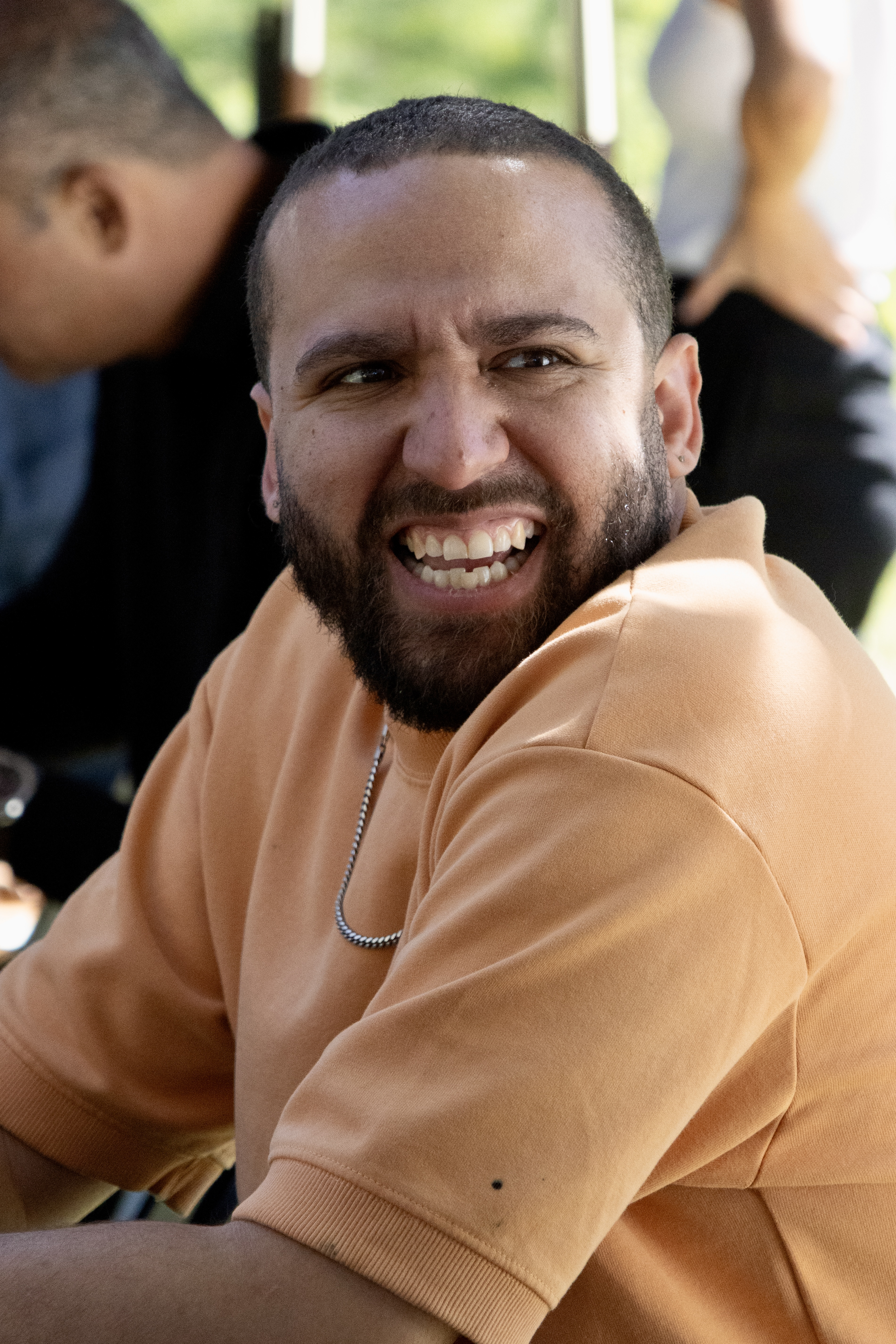
- Lowery at the 2025 Adelaide Writers' Week
- Born: 1990 (age 35–36)
- Education: Ohio University
- Occupation: Journalist
- Notable work: "Fatal Force" project; They Can't Kill Us All: Ferguson, Baltimore, and a New Era in America's Racial Justice Movement
- Awards: Pulitzer Prize for National Reporting (2016)

Wesley Lowery (born 1990) is an American journalist who has worked at American University, CBS News, and The Washington Post. He was a lead on the Post's "Fatal Force" project that won the Pulitzer Prize for National Reporting in 2016. In 2017, he became a CNN political contributor and in 2020 was announced as a correspondent for 60 in 6, a short-form spinoff of 60 Minutes for Quibi. Lowery is a former fellow at Georgetown University's Institute of Politics and Public Service.

In March 2025, Lowery resigned from his job at American University amid allegations that he had made inappropriate sexual comments and unwanted sexual advances toward students and journalists. In May 2025, the Columbia Journalism Review published allegations of sexual misconduct against Lowery, saying he exhibited a "pattern of predatory behavior toward young women in journalism" spanning from 2018 to 2024.

== Early life ==
Lowery attended Shaker Heights High School and Ohio University. During college, Lowery was editor-in-chief of the campus newspaper, The Post, and interned at The Detroit News, The Columbus Dispatch, and The Wall Street Journal.

== Career ==
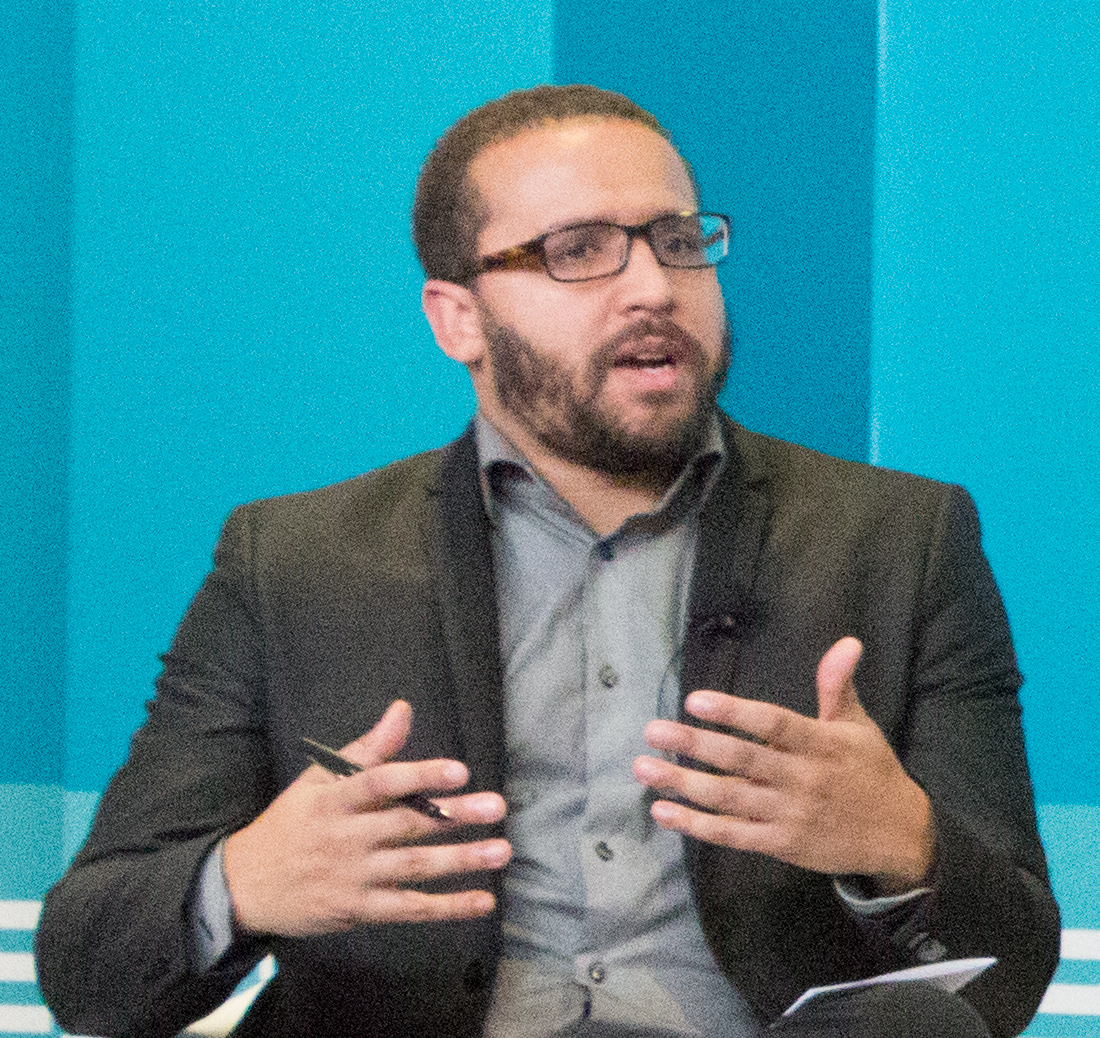
Lowery in 2016

Lowery was a reporting fellow at the Los Angeles Times, then moved to the Boston Globe, becoming a general assignment political reporter in 2013 and covered topics including the murder trial of the NFL's Aaron Hernandez, Boston's mayoral race, and the manhunt for the Boston marathon bombers.

In 2014, the National Association of Black Journalists named Lowery "Emerging Journalist of the Year". Lowery moved to The Washington Post in 2014; The Washingtonian described him in 2015 as the paper's "rising star...a terrific reporter" with a track record for "establishing deep sources, writing colorful solo pieces, and contributing to team coverage." Lowery has served as a judge for the American Mosaic Journalism Prize each year from 2018-2025.

=== Ferguson coverage and arrest ===
In August 2014, Lowery covered the Ferguson protests for The Post. On August 13, Lowery and Huffington Post reporter Ryan Reilly were arrested in a McDonald's. Journalism groups as well as Lowery's and Reilly's employers condemned the arrests, saying they were, as the Columbia Journalism Review characterized it, "deliberate and unjustifiable attempts to interfere with the press." A year later, shortly before the statute of limitations was set to expire, St. Louis County prosecutors charged Lowery and Reilly with trespassing and interfering with a police officer. In May 2016, prosecutors dropped all charges against Reilly and Lowery in exchange for an agreement that the reporters would not sue the county.

=== Fatal Force project ===
Lowery was a lead (also see Kimbriell Kelly), on the Post's "Fatal Force" project, a database that tracked 990 police shootings in 2015. At the time, the federal government had no comprehensive, nationwide data on police killings; the most systematic data available came from databases compiled by independent, grassroots organizations like Fatal Encounters, Stolen Lives Project, Operation Ghetto Storm, and Killed by Police. Drawing on these databases as well as local newspaper reports, law enforcement websites and social media, Lowery and colleagues built out the Post's Fatal Force database. The project won the Pulitzer Prize for National Reporting in 2016, and the Justice Department announced a pilot program to begin collecting a more comprehensive set of use-of-force statistics in 2017.

=== They Can't Kill Us All ===
Lowery's first book They Can't Kill Us All: Ferguson, Baltimore, and a New Era in America's Racial Justice Movement was published November 15, 2016 by Little, Brown. The book describes the Black Lives Matter movement in the context of U.S. history as well as Lowery's personal history. The Seattle Times listed it as among the fall releases they "can't wait to read". The Boston Globe said Lowery "offers fresh insights into what it means to cover a broad national story about race in a rigorous and sustained way." Noting that Lowery wrote the book at 25, The New York Times said, "His book is electric, because it is so well reported, so plainly told and so evidently the work of a man who has not grown a callus on his heart."

Lowery won the 2017 Christopher Isherwood Prize for Autobiographical Prose from the Los Angeles Times Book Prizes for They Can't Kill Us All. In January 2022, it was reported that AMC will be adapting the book into a television series. The project will be produced by Brad Weston's production company Makeready, with Don Cheadle, Weston and Lowery as executive producers.

=== Quibi ===
Lowery joined CBS News in 2020. It was speculated that part of the reason for Lowery's departure from The Washington Post was that he was unhappy with the newspaper's social media policy for its journalists, which discouraged some of his more provocative comments on Twitter and elsewhere; Lowery had clashed with the managing editors before on content in his tweets. At CBS News, he worked on 60 in 6, a shorter six-minute spinoff of 60 Minutes for Quibi.

=== American University ===
In September 2023, Lowery joined the faculty of the American University School of Communication where he served as an associate professor of investigative journalism and as the executive editor of the Investigative Reporting Workshop. In March 2025, Lowery resigned from American University amid allegations of inappropriate sexual conduct.

== Sexual misconduct allegations ==
In March 2025, Lowery resigned from American University after being accused of at least three Title IX complaints, in which he was alleged to have made inappropriate sexual comments in meetings with students and other abusive behavior towards journalists.

In May 2025, the Columbia Journalism Review reported that Lowery was accused of sexually assaulting at least four women.
