= Kimbriell Kelly =

- Born: Kimbriell Kelly
- Education: Saint Xavier University; Boston University
- Occupations: Editor; Investigative Reporter
- Years active: 2004 - present
- Employer: Chicago Public Media
- Awards: Pulitzer Prize

Kimbriell Kelly is an American journalist currently working as the editor-in-chief of Chicago Public Media, which owns Chicago Sun-Times and WBEZ. She is a former Pulitzer Prize-winning investigative reporter at the Washington Post. She is an expert on "public records requests, research, and data analysis".

== Early life ==
Kelly is originally from the Chicago area and is a 1997 graduate of Saint Xavier University as well as a 1998 graduate of Boston University.

== Career ==
Kelly began her career at the Daily Herald and subsequently the Chicago Reporter. While in Illinois, Kelly hosted a public-affairs show on WFLD -Channel 32 and a weekly radio show on Chicago Public Media WBEZ 91.5-FM.

Kelly then worked in Washington, DC as an investigative reporter at the Washington Post.

In 2019, Kelly left the Post to become the deputy editor for Enterprise and Investigations in the Washington Bureau of the Los Angeles Times. In that role, Kelly lead a team of five reporters focused on policy and issues of public record. Kelly is currently the Times' Washington Bureau Chief.

Kelly is also a visiting lecturer in the Humanities Council and Ferris professor of journalism at Princeton University.

=== Fatal Force project ===
While at the Post, Kelly worked on the "Fatal Force" project, a database that tracked 990 police shootings in 2015. At the time, neither the federal government nor state governments had comprehensive, nationwide data on police killings. Drawing on databases put together by nonprofit groups as well as local newspaper reports, law enforcement websites and social media, Lowery and colleagues built out the Post's Fatal Force database.

Kelly was one of 70 staffers from multiple departments assembled the database and compiled stories, photos, data, graphics, and videos about trends revealed by the information. The Post has continued to update its database since its founding.

=== Pulitzer Prize ===
The Fatal Force project, on which Kelly was one of the lead authors (also see Wesley Lowery), won the Pulitzer Prize for National Reporting in 2016, and the Justice Department announced a pilot program to begin collecting a more comprehensive set of use-of-force statistics in 2017.

Kelly found out about the 2016 win when she was on her honeymoon in Aruba. She coauthored the first story in the series and did the necessary data analysis of two decades of police prosecutions. Kelly explained that the project "raised greater accountability in how statistics nationally are kept and prompted an overhaul of those efforts. I’m proud that I got to be a part of something that makes a difference."
