= Heidi Boghosian =

American lawyer and activist

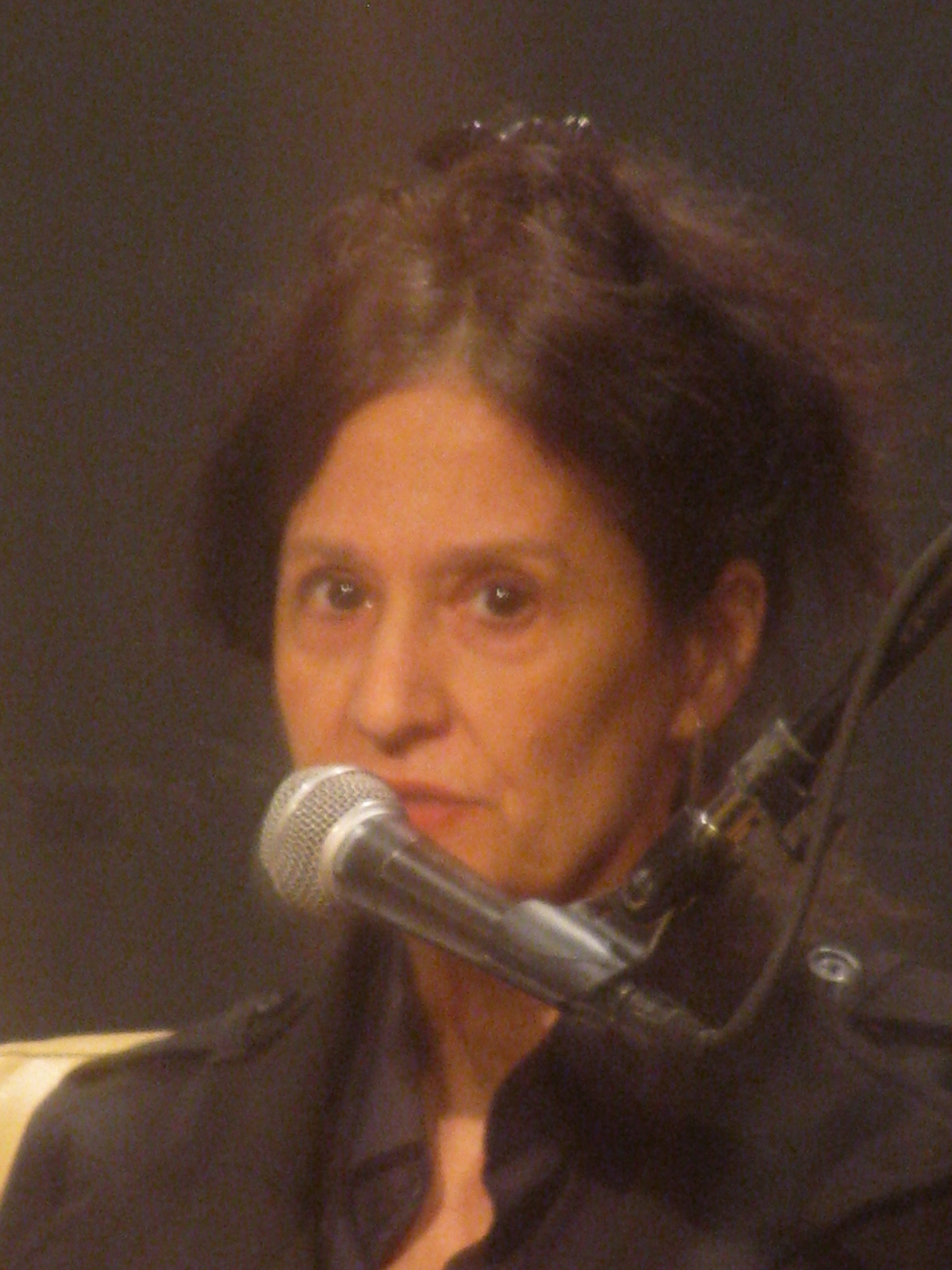
- Born: New Britain, Connecticut, U.S.
- Education: Brown University; Boston University; Temple Law School
- Occupations: Lawyer, activist
- Website: spyingondemocracy.com

Heidi Boghosian, a lawyer, is the executive director of the A.J. Muste Foundation for Peace and Justice. Previously she was the executive director of the National Lawyers Guild, a progressive bar association established in 1937, where she oversaw the legal defense of people targeted by government. She co-hosts the weekly civil liberties radio show Law and Disorder, that airs on Pacifica Radio's WBAI, New York, and is broadcast on more than 150 other stations.

== Government Surveillance ==
Boghosian's work often focuses on how technology affects our daily lives. In a 2010 Huffington Post article titled "Are You Chip-Ready", she discusses radio-frequency identification (RFID) technology that has been making its way into many people's lives, including students whose attendance can now be tracked by an RFID chip implanted in their student ID cards. She points out identity theft, stalking, government spying, and security breaches as just some of the negative outcomes of RFID technology.

In 2012, Boghosian documented her own data trail to show how everyday transactions and ventures are captured and stored, most times without our knowledge. From the surveillance monitor outside of her apartment building, to a purchase at a local coffee shop, Boghosian illustrates how corporations play a larger role in people's daily lives. The National Security Agency (NSA), for instance, collects metadata on every phone call Americans make, as was revealed in June 2013 by Edward Snowden.

== Bibliography ==
- Cyber Citizens: Saving Democracy with Digital Literacy (Beacon Press, 2025) ISBN 9780807010846
- "I Have Nothing to Hide": and 20 Other Myths About Surveillance and Privacy (Beacon Press, 2021) ISBN 978-0807061268
- Spying on Democracy: Government Surveillance, Corporate Power, and Public Resistance (City Lights, 2013) ISBN 978-0-87286-599-0
- The Business of Surveillance, ABA Human Rights, Vol. 39 No. 3, 2013
- Police Brutality: Opposing Viewpoints, Chapter: "Antiterrorism policies result in police abuse of dissenters (Greenhaven Press, 2006) ISBN 9780737733594
- Applying Restraints to Private Police (Missouri Law Review, Vol. 70, Issue 1, Winter 2005)
- The Assault on Free Speech, Public Assembly, and Dissent (North River Press, 2004) ISBN 978-0884271796
