= Joseph Forer =

20th-century American lawyer

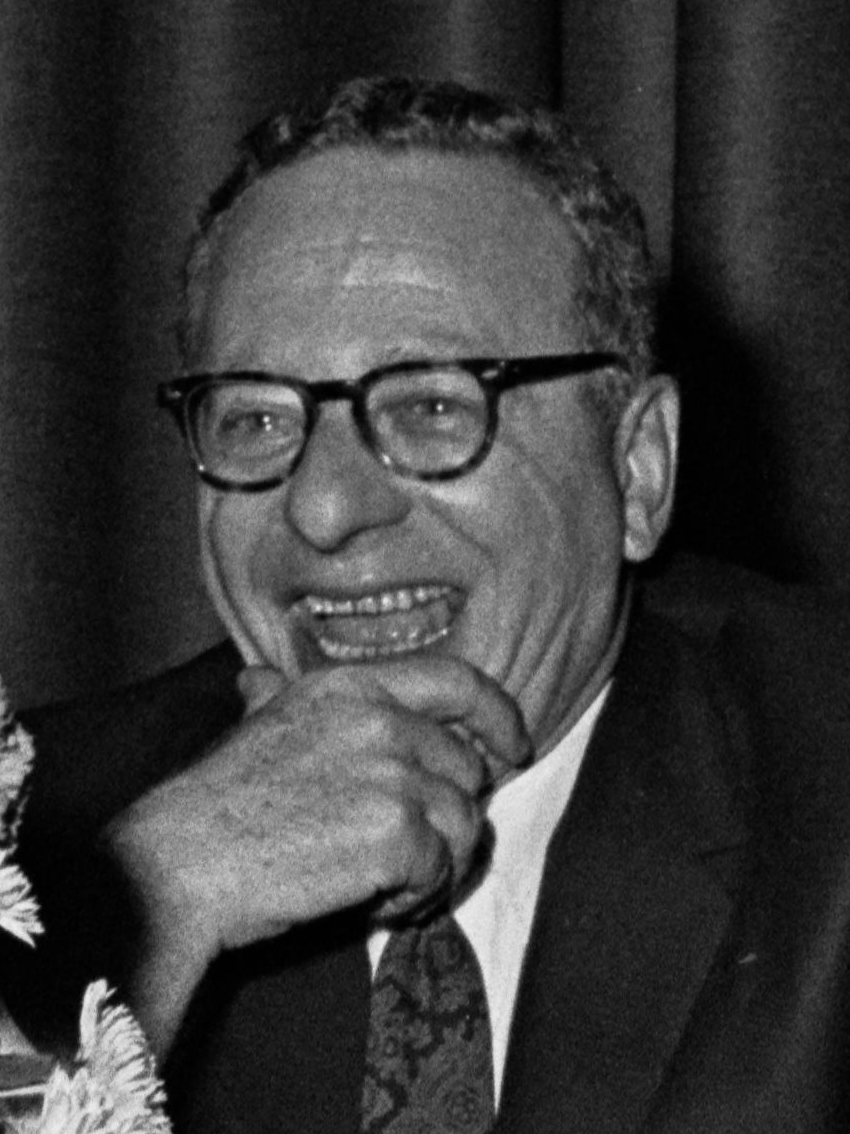
- Forer in 1968
- Born: 1911; Trenton, New Jersey, U.S.
- Died: June 20, 1986 (aged 75)
- Education: Rutgers University; University of Pennsylvania Law School
- Occupation: Lawyer
- Years active: 1930s-1978
- Employer(s): Greenberg, Forer & Rein; Forer & Rein
- Organization: National Lawyers Guild
- Children: Jane F. Gentleman
- Relatives: Richard Forer

Joseph Forer (1911 – 20 June 1986) was a 20th-century American attorney who, with partner David Rein, supported Progressive causes, including communists and African-Americans who had been discriminated against. Forer was one of the founders of the National Lawyers Guild and its DC chapter. He was also an expert in the "Lost Laws" of Washington, DC, enacted in 1872–1873, that outlawed segregation at business places.

== Background ==
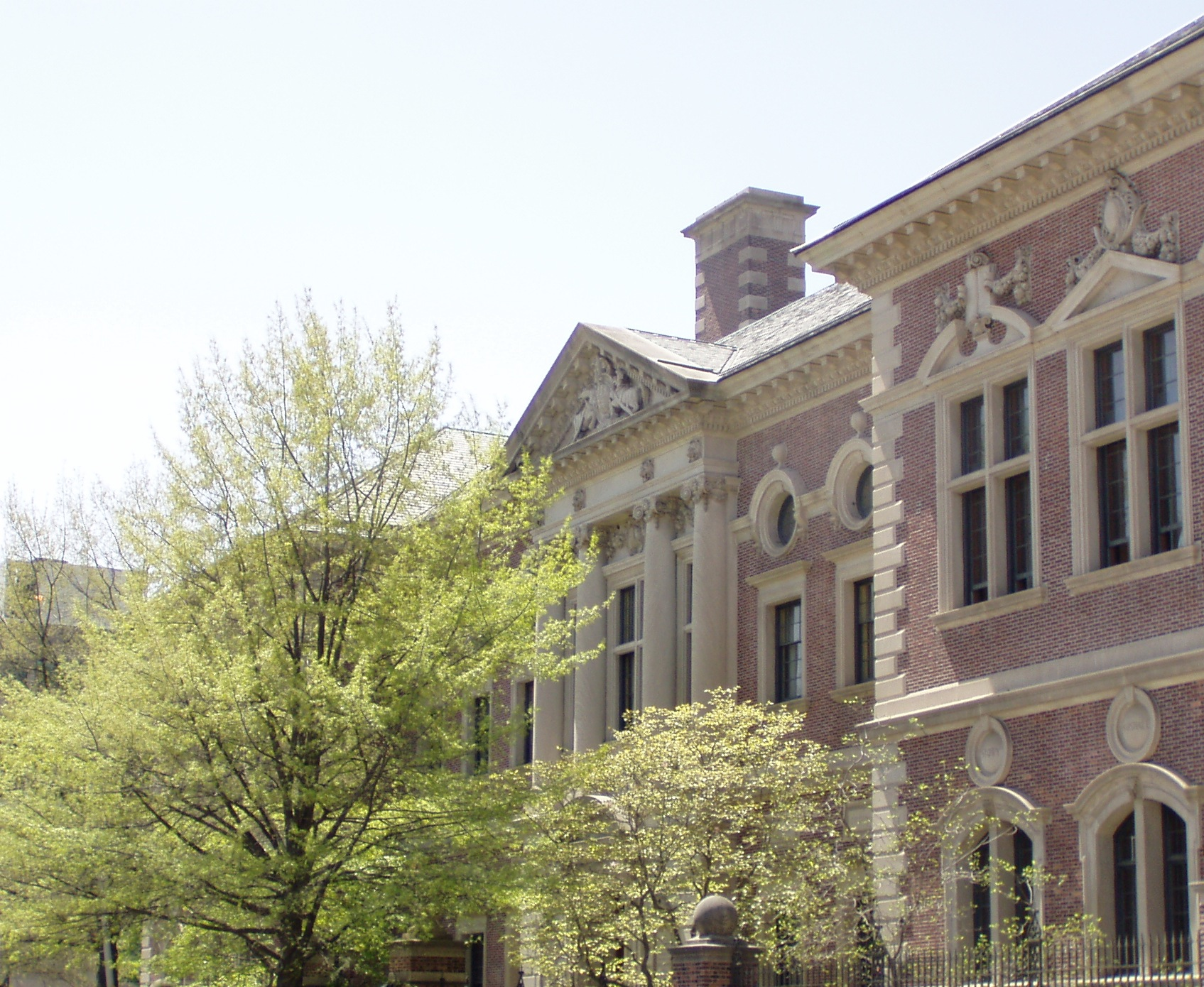
Silverman Hall at the University of Pennsylvania Law School, where Forer studied law

Joseph Forer was born in 1911 in Trenton, New Jersey. He received a state scholarship for college. Forer received his BA and MA from Rutgers University, where he excelled as a student and joined Phi Beta Kappa. In 1936, he received a law degree from the University of Pennsylvania Law School. In June 1936, Forer received UPenn's "Peter McCall Prize." Forer also served on the University of Pennsylvania Law Review as contributor, editor, and managing editor.

== Career ==
=== New Deal ===
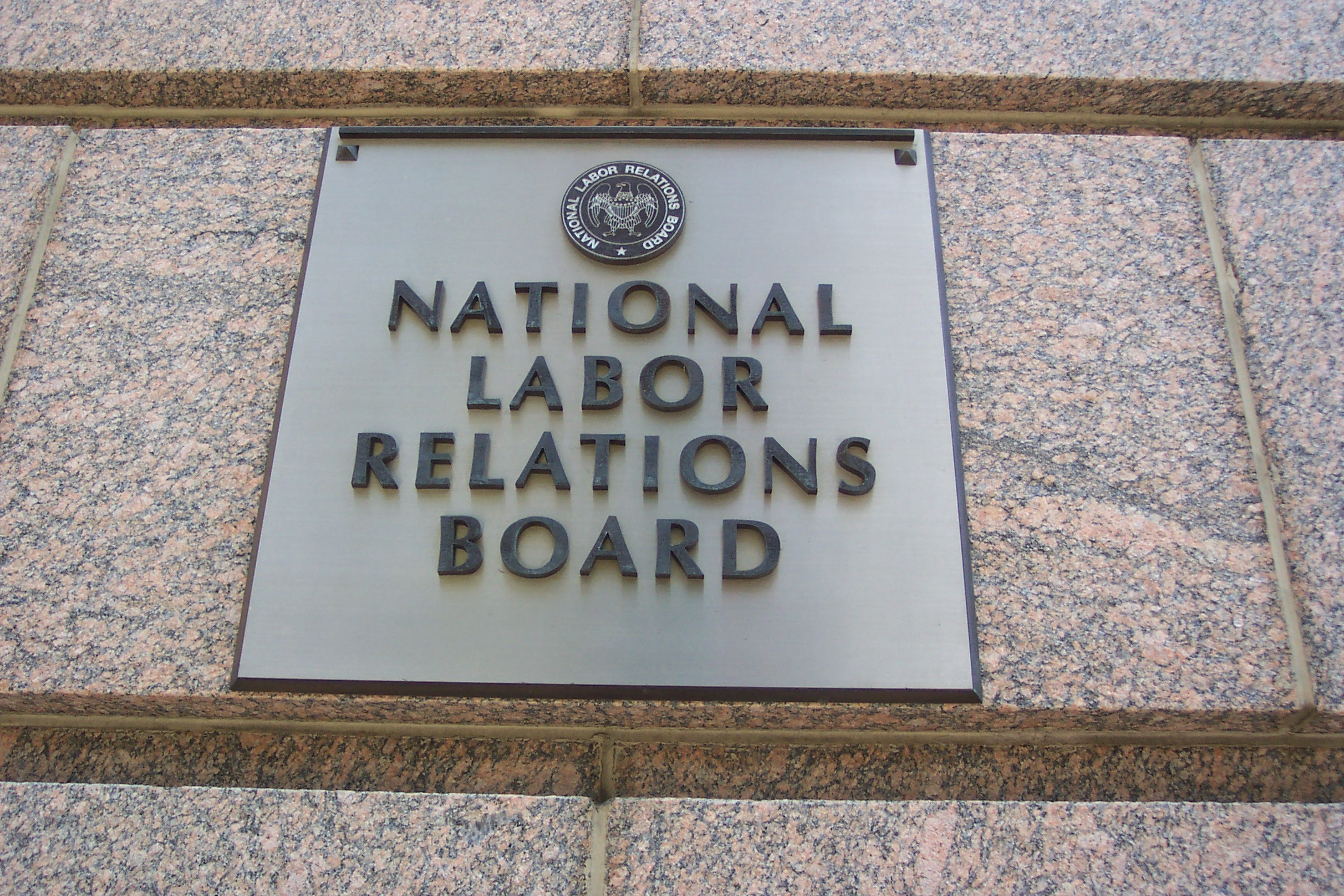
Plaque outside 1099 14th Street NW in Washington, D.C., the NLRB HW (2013), whete Forer worked in the 1930s

After graduating from law school, Forer joined the United States Treasury.

Around 1937, like his friend David Rein, Forer joined the National Labor Relations Board (NLRB). Also in 1937, Forer became a founder of the National Lawyers Guild. He served as chairman of the District Affairs Committee of the DC chapter of the National Lawyers Guild. During 1940, he worked for the Rural Electrification Administration.

Starting in 1941, he worked in the Office of Price Administration (OPA). Thomas Irwin Emerson (1907–1991), later a First Amendment scholar, worked with Forer at the NLRB and supervised Forer at OPA. Another OPA colleague was Herman A. Greenberg, director of food enforcement; Forer was direct of apparel and industrial materials enforcement. In his role, Forer helped enforce pricing policies on black market lumber. He noted the need for training of OPA agents in the field. He appeared in legal cases on behalf of OPA, e.g., Porter v. Senderowitz. He upheld legal action against J.C. Penney.

While at OPA, Forer first appeared before congressional hearings. On September 27, 1944, as an OPA director, Forer testified as an OPA "attorney for the Division" of Apparel before a "Select Committee of the House of Representatives to Investigate Acts of Executive Agencies Beyond the Scope of Their Authority." He described himself at an "enforcement attorney" when questioned by US Representative Fred A. Hartley Jr. (Rep-NJ) (soon to be co-sponsor of the Taft-Hartley Act). He advised OPA when companies charges prices higher than government price ceilings. Hartley attacked Forer and colleagues for failing to grant pretrial conference and for appealing an adverse ruling.

=== Law firm ===
In August 1948, Forer and Greenberg resigned from the OPA. Later that year, David Rein joined Forer as private practice law partners in Washington, DC. They formed "Greenberg, Forer & Rein" with Herman Greenberg (who represented Julian Wadleigh just prior to his appearing as a witness during the Hiss-Chambers case). By 1949, the firm was still "Greenberg, Forer & Rein" at 1105 K Street NW in Washington. In 1950, they listed as "Forer & Rein" at 711 14 Street NW in 718 of the Kass Building. One of their early clients was the Food, Tobacco, Agricultural, and Allied Workers (FTA-CIO), a "Communist-led union." Another early client was the National Maritime Union.

Together, they "represented more than 100 persons who had been termed 'unfriendly' witnesses by the House Committee on Un-American Activities, the Senate Internal Security Subcommittee of the Senate Judiciary subcommittee headed by the late senator Joseph McCarthy."

=== 1940s: Mundt-Nixon Bill, Progressive party ===
In July 1947, Forer represented the FTA CIO against R.J. Reynolds before HUAC when two members pled the Fifth Amendment when asked to name communists. The FTA claimed accusations before HUAC by witness Ann Mathews, who name them among 15 communist members within the union, was really an attack by RJR against an 8,000 FTA strike.

In September 1947 during his second appearance before HUAC, Gerhard Eisler asked to have Herman Greenberg and Joseph Forer represent him.

On November 28, 1947, Forer, as acting chairman of the First Southeast Chapter of the Southern Conference for Human Welfare, charged that members of a Congress Heights Citizens Association had made "references to vigilantism and to possible use of violence" to keep African-Americans out of that section of town. In December 1947, Forer asked that US Attorney General Tom C. Clark investigate.

In early December 1947, Forer and Rein represented the National Maritime Union CIO (NMU) to file a challenge in the United States District Court for the District of Columbia, asking the court to invalidate a filing for financial data of unions.

On January 26–28 and February 2, 1948, a hearing of the House Education and Labor Subcommittee, chaired by U.S. Representative Clare E. Hoffman, occurred on the topic of a strike by United Cafeteria and Restaurant Workers (Local 471) and its parent, the United Public Workers of America (UPWA), CIO, against Government Services, Inc. (GSI), which had already lasted nearly a month. Hoffman refused to let UPWA head Abram Flaxer read a statement and asked questions including whether Flaxer was a communist. One of his UAW attorneys, Nathan R. Witt, objected to "abuse of congressional power." When Forer rose to follow on from Witt, Hoffman asked him, "Are you the same Forer who defended Gerhard Eisler?" When Witt objected to Hoffman's question, which led Hoffman to eject Witt from the hearing. On January 26, 1948, UPWA negotiations director Alfred Bernstein (father of Carl Bernstein), charged that House committee agents had raided the union's offices. During January, William S. Tyson, solicitor for the Labor Department, and Robert N. Denham, general counsel for the National Labor Relations Board, both agreed that nothing in the Taft-Hartley Act prohibited GSI from bargaining with a non-complying union. However, Denham added, the Act intended to "eliminate Communist influence from unions by denying to such unions the services of NLRB."

In February 1948, Forer and Rein, as "CIO Attorneys," defended Arkansas strikers before the Supreme Court.

In April–June 1948, Forer supported partner David Rein and Abraham J. Isserman in defending Gerhard Eisler, accused of a violation of 52 Stat. 942 (1938), 2 U.S.C.A. § 192 (refusal to testify) before the District Court of the United States for the District of Columbia (which Eisler lost) and then the United States Court of Appeals District of Columbia. (Belford Lawson Jr. (1901-1985), co-founder of the New Negro Alliance (NNA), filed an amicus curiae for the National Lawyers Guild.)

Also in April–June 1948, Forer and Rein represented the National Maritime Union and its leaders Joseph Curran and Ferdinand Smith before the U.S. District Court for the District of Columbia with help from Herman Rosenfeld of New York.

In early May 1948, Lee Pressman joined Forer in representing Gerhard Eisler and four others (Irving Potash, vice president of the Fur and Leather Workers Union; Ferdinand C. Smith, secretary of the National Maritime Union; Charles A. Doyle of the Gas, Coke and Chemical Workers Union, and John Williamson, labor secretary of the CPUSA). On May 5, 1946, Pressman and Forer received a preliminary injunction so their defendants might have hearings with examiners unconnected with the investigations and prosecutions by examiners of the Immigration and Naturalization Service. (In May 1949, Eisler jumped bail and secretly boarded the Polish liner MS Batory bound for London.) On May 20, 1948, Forer, as a representative of the National Lawyers Guild, "assailed the Mundt bill as a threat to civil liberties" during a meeting of the Washington, DC, committee of the Conference on Human Welfare.

On June 28, 1948, Forer, as a member of the local "D.C. Committee for Wallace," chaired a subcommittee meeting regarding the platform of the Progressive Party and its presidential candidate Henry A. Wallace. They were preparing for the 1948 Progressive National Convention on July 23–25, 1948, in Philadelphia. Issues addressed by the subcommittee included: placing European relief under supervision of the United Nations (rather than the Marshall Plan), disarmament of all nations, without exception, efforts to iron out differences with the USSR, civil rights, a veterans' bonus, end to "thought control" of Government workers, repeal of the Taft-Hartley Act with reenactment of the National Labor Relations Act, and support for the new state of Israel.

In 1949, during the trial of Judith Coplon, Forer examined investigative files submitted by the Federal Bureau of Investigation (FBI). Based on these, he drafted a report for the National Lawyers Guild's Special Committee to Study Certain Alleged Practices of the FBI. In January 1950, the NLG published it as a report for US President Harry S. Truman that accused the FBI of "systematic search by illegal methods" into the politics of thousands of private citizens, reported The Washington Post. The report focused on FBI methods used against Coplon. The report recommended that the President stop such practices. It also recommended that the President appoint a committee of private citizens to investigate the FBI. In addition to Forer, contributors to the report were NLG president Clifford J. Durr, Frederick K. Beutel, Thomas I. Emmerson, O. John Rogge, James A. Cobb, and Robert J. Silberstein.

=== 1950s: SISS (McCarran, McCarthy) ===
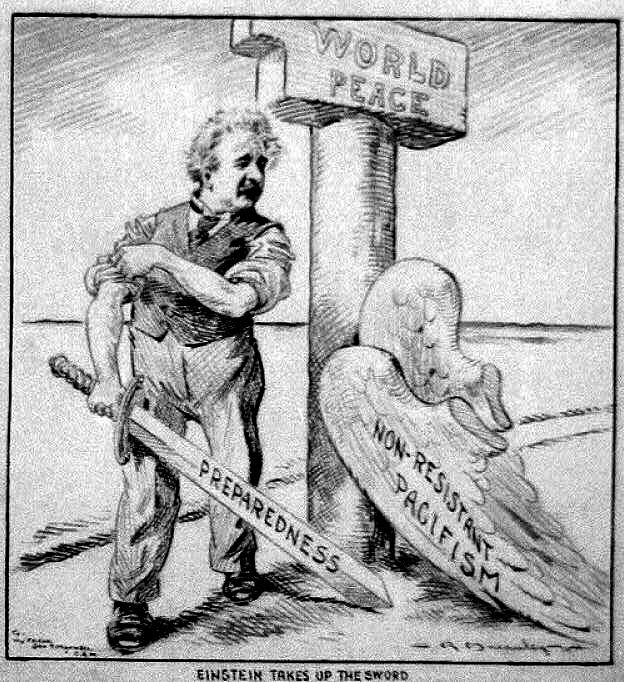
Cartoon of Albert Einstein, shed of "Pacifism" wings, standing near pillar of "World Peace," rolling up sleeves and holding sword of "Preparedness" (by Charles R. Macauley, c. 1933)

From 1951 to 1953, Forer, with John Abt and Vito Marcantonio, represented the CPUSA in the matter of Herbert Brownell, Jr., Attorney General of the United States, Petitioner v. the Communist Party of the United States of America, Respondent.

Also starting in 1951, Forer represented numerous cases in the United States District Court District of Columbia including Bart, Berman, Branca, and Hiskey.

On April 8, 1953, Forer represented Howard Selsam of the Jefferson School of Social Science.

On April 24, 1953, Forer represented William Frauenglass, an English teacher at the James Madison High School in Brooklyn, New York, before the United States Senate Subcommittee on Internal Security. Reading of the testimony, world-famous scientist Albert Einstein wrote Frauenglass a letter, which reached The New York Times (Einstein had added a postscript stating the letter "need not remain confidential"), advising "every intellectual called before a Congressional investigating committee should refuse to testify, and 'must be prepared for jail and economic ruin, in short, for the sacrifice of his personal welfare in the interest of the cultural welfare of his country'." Frauenglass did refuse to testify further – and he did lose his job. (See "Political views of Albert Einstein")

In 1956, Forer and partner Rein supported Harold I. Cammer in defense of Ben Gold in Ben Gold v. United States in the Court of Appeals for the District of Columbia Circuit. On February 29, 1959, partner Herman A. Greenberg appeared before the SISS as counsel for Mark Zborowski (a Soviet spy involved in the deaths of Lev Sedov and his father Leon Trotsky as well as spying on David Dallin, Victor Kravchenko).

In 1957, Forer supported partner David Rein in Rowoldt v. Perfetto before the United States Supreme Court with support from Ann Fagan Ginger. That same year, HUAC published part 2 of its report Communist Political Subversion, which included a highly detailed account of a "testimonial banquet" held on 11 October 1956 for Forer and Rein as "attorneys defending Charles Rowoldt" before the Supreme Court on 15 October 1956. The account even included a list of guests for 21 tables.

In 1958, Forer represented Clara Hutcherson Saba before HUAC.

In 1961, Forer and Nathan Witt represented the International Union of Mine, Mill and Smelter Workers in Robert F. Kennedy, Attorney General of the United States, Petitioner, v. International Union of Mine, Mill and Smelter Workers, Respondent before the Subversive Activities Control Board.

=== Lost Laws and DC v. John R. Thompson Co. ===
==== Mary Church Terrell ====
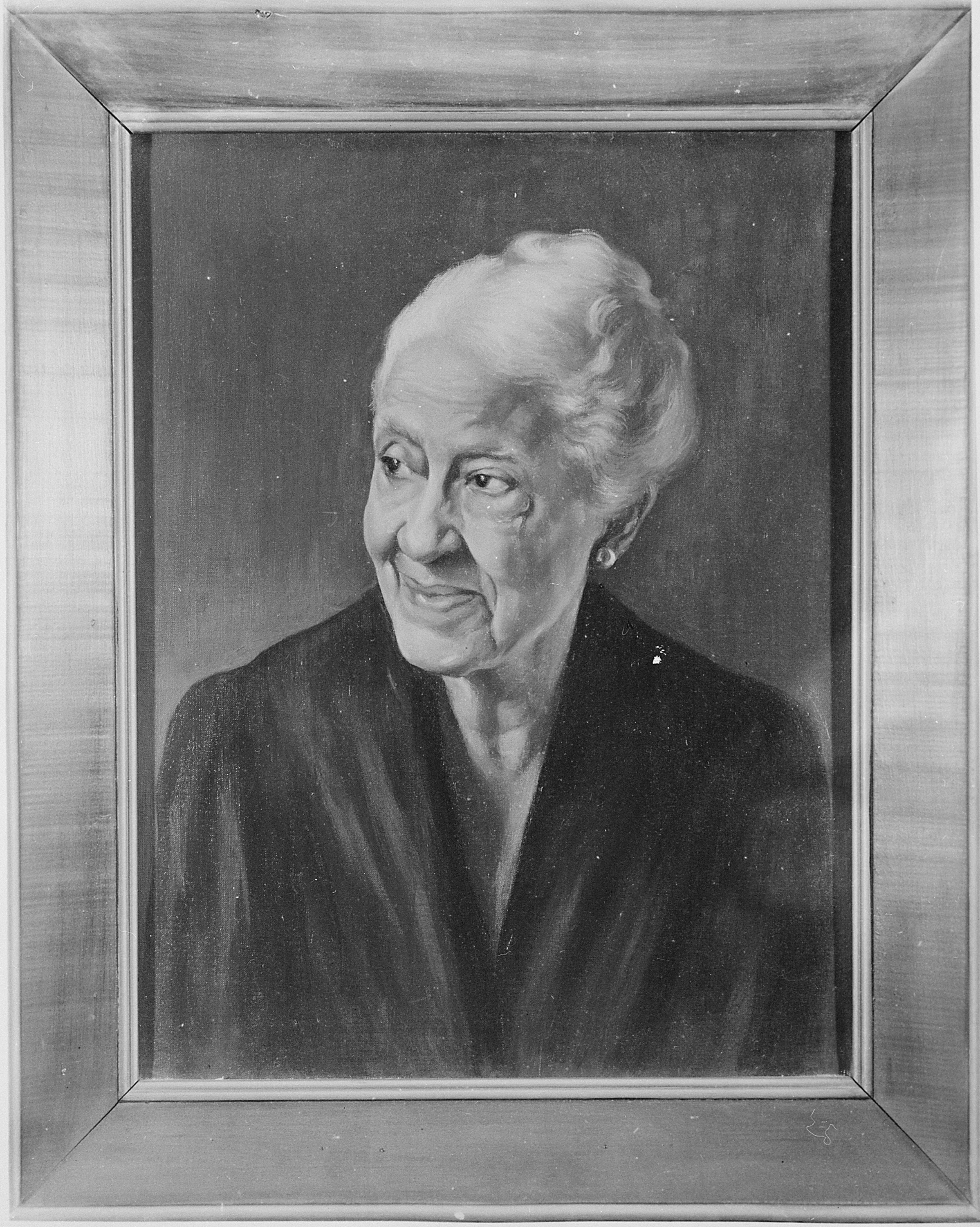
Painting of Mary Church Terrell by Betsy Graves Reyneau, 1888–1964

In May 1949, Dr. Mary Church Terrell decided to take on the issue of desegregation head-on. She consulted Forer. Forer led the National Lawyers Guild's DC chapter in submitting an opinion in their favor. With such advice, Dr. Terrell and colleagues Clark F. King, Essie Thompson, and Arthur F. Elmer entered the segregated Thompson's Restaurant, next door to the offices of Forer and Rein's office at 711 14th Street NW, in Washington, DC, between H an G Streets cut by New York Avenue and across the street from the Trans-Lux Theatre. When refused service, Terrell & Co. sued.

Attorney Ringgold Hart, representing Thompson, argued on April 1, 1950, that District laws were unconstitutional.

Regardless, Forer's research found that the U.S. Congress had jurisdiction over DC and so could overrule segregation; Charles H. Houston, dean of Howard University Law School concurred. Specifically, Forer found that anti-segregation laws had passed and been enforced in the 1870s, including a case involving Harvey's Restaurant in 1874.

==== District of Columbia v. John R. Thompson Co. ====
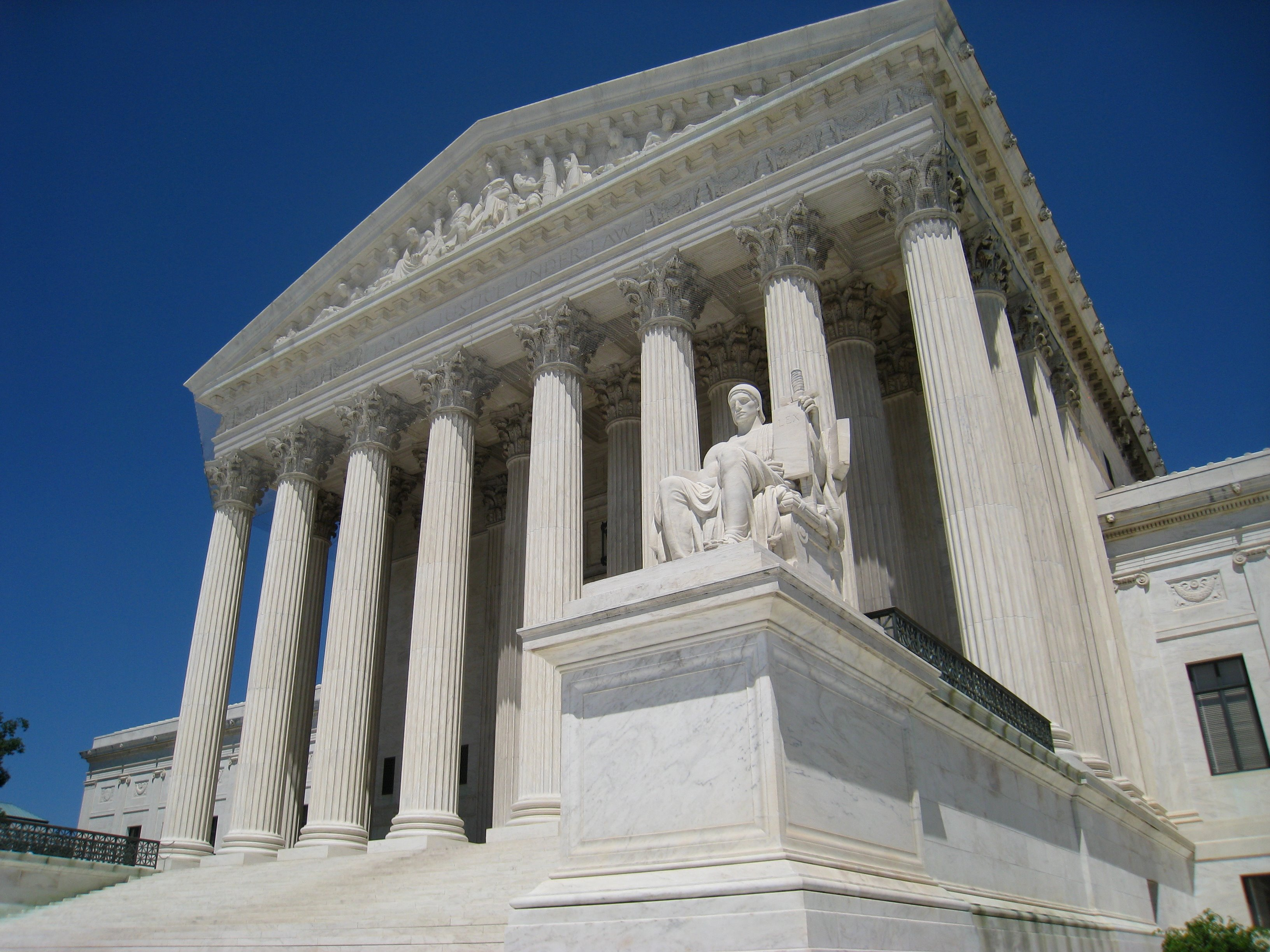
Supreme Court of the United States

The case District of Columbia v. John R. Thompson Co. reached the U.S. Supreme Court. Forer and Rein argued the case. On June 8, 1953, the court ruled that segregated eating places in Washington, DC, were unconstitutional.

The Washington Post recounted in 1985, "Four days after the Supreme Court ruled, Mary Terrell and the three other original complainants went back to Thompson's. Joe Forer followed them in. As he recalls the moment, the manager, himself, came over and personally, even obsequiously, carried Mary Terrell's tray to the table."

=== Supreme Court cases ===
Between 1948 and 1951 alone, Forer & Rein dealt with more than 20 cases before the United States Supreme Court.

Forer argued several cases involving the First Amendment to the United States Constitution:

- 1948: Cole v. Arkansas (with David Rein, both serving as attorneys for the CIO)
- 1960:
  - Chaunt v. United States
  - Kimm v. Rosenberg
- 1961: Communist Party of the United States v. Subversive Activities Control Board
- 1964: Aptheker v. Secretary of State
- 1967: Giles v. Maryland
- 1969: Watts v. United States

==== Communist Party of the United States v. Subversive Activities Control Board ====
During Communist Party of the United States vs. Subversive Activities Control Board, 367 U.S. 1 (1961), Forer served as co-counsel with John Abt to represent the CPUSA.

==== Giles-Johnson case ====
In 1961, three African-American youths (James Giles, John Giles, and Joseph Johnson) received death sentences for allegedly raping a white teenage girl. The severity of the sentence, suppression of evidence by the State of Maryland, and other actions led to public perception of racisim, which led to formation of the Giles-Johnson Defense Committee in July 1962 by Mrs. Howard Ross and 60 other Maryland residents. Forer joined the committee and came to lead its lawyers. Thanks to its efforts, Governor J. Millard Tawes commuted the death sentences to life imprisonment in October 1963. Their efforts led to a decision by Circuit Court Judge Walter Moorman for a new trial in 1964. On April 7, 1965, the State of Maryland asked its court of appeal to deny the Giles brothers, represented by Forer, a new trial. On July 13, 1965, the Maryland Court of Appeals refused to allow the trial. The case reached the Supreme Court as Giles v. Maryland, with argument on October 12, 1966, by Forer and (Nathan Witt's son) Hal Witt (hired by the NAACP) and decision on February 20, 1967. In 1967, the Giles brothers received a retrial, which resulted in a drop of charges. In 1968 Joseph Johnson received a pardon by Governor Spiro T. Agnew.

=== Other cases ===
Forer & Rein served the rights of striking workers, foreign-born aliens (with leftist leanings, e.g., Gerhard Eisler), and servicemen. They won for the National Council for American-Soviet Friendship the right to contest in court its designation by the attorney general as a "subversive organization."

Forer & Rein also represented members of the press on strike against The Washington Post in 1975.

=== FBI target ===
In 1977, a release of internal memos of the FBI revealed, according to The Washington Post, that:

An Oct. 4, 1951 memo to Hoover said that a search of trash at the Washington offices of guild lawyers Joseph Forer and David Rein had uncovered a draft resolution urging President Truman to authorize a citizens' investigation of the FBI because of its alleged excesses in loyalty checks.

=== Retirement ===
Forer retired from practice with Rein in July 1978.

On June 9, 1979, the Washington, DC, chapter of the National Lawyers Guild held an evening event to celebrate his career.

== Personal and death ==
Forer's daughter, Jane F. Gentleman, is a notable statistician. He was the uncle of author Richard Forer.

Forer, Rein, and many friends and associates lived at Trenton Terrace, 950 Mississippi Avenue SE, Washington DC 20032.

As a child, Carl Bernstein knew Joseph Forer and David Rein.

Forer died age 75 on June 20, 1986.

== Legacy ==
In 1954, following the outcome of the Thompson Case, schools in Washington, DC, began to desegregate, followed by jobs, buses, and government services.

Archives of the Giles-Johnson Defense Council reside at the Hornbake Library at the University of Maryland.

The Bancroft Library at the University of California/Berkeley houses papers of Forer along with other members (Osmond K. Fraenkel, Carol Weiss King, Samuel Neuburger, David Freedman, Justine Wise Polier, Jeremiah Gutman, Martin Popper, Abraham Isserman, Dennis Roberts, Robert J. Silberstein, Justice Raymond Peters, and George W. Crockett, Jr.) of the National Lawyers Guild and its predecessor, the International Juridical Association.

As historian Joan Quigley describes:

In the late 1940s, while Congress and the executive branch trawled for evidence of disloyalty and subversion, Rein and Forer immersed themselves in difficult and disfavored causes: opposing the Mundt-Nixon Bill; defending labor unions and alleged Communists; upholding the Bill of Rights. Rein ... represented Gerhard Eisler ... As progressives and New Deal veterans, Forer and Rein also nurtured ties to the National Lawyers Guild, which HUAC had branded a Communist front in 1944.

Historian Maarten Zwiers refers to him as "the Communist Party's lawyer." and wrote:

Joe Forer ... was senior partner in Forer and Rein, the Communist Party's leading law firm in the capital. He had defended people accused of communist sympathies before Eastland's Internal Security Subcommittee on several occasions ...

Historian Marvin Caplan wrote:

When a staff attorney at a HUAC hearing asked Joe Forer how many times he had appeared before the committee, Forer couldn't remember. Too many times, he said, to be able to give an exact figure.

Attorney Victor Rabinowitz recalled in his memoir that Forer's circle of communist-supportive lawyers stretched to New York City (headquarters of the National Lawyers Guild). They included Harry Sacher, Abe Unger, David Freeman, David Rein, and Rabinowitz himself, "all lawyers active in the representation of witnesses before congressional committees." Rabinowitz explained:

Unger and Freeman were attorneys for the (Communist) Party; Sacher had been lead defense in the prosecution of Communist party leaders under the Smith Act; I was a member of the Party and the others were close to it if not members. We certainly weren't making Party policy, but our views would have some influence on the Party and its members.

== See also ==
- Jane F. Gentleman
- Mary Church Terrell
- Charles H. Houston
- Mundt-Nixon Bill
- Gerhard Eisler
- HUAC
- National Lawyers Guild
- Lee Pressman
- John Abt

== External sources ==
- "Forer and Rein (Washington, D.C.)". WorldCat OCLC Identities. 2010.
- VitoAntonio.com: Image of Joseph Forer with John Abt and Vito Marcantonio
- ImgBro: Image of Joseph Forer (undated)
- Historical Society of Washington, DC
