= Gerhart Eisler =

German politician (1897–1968)

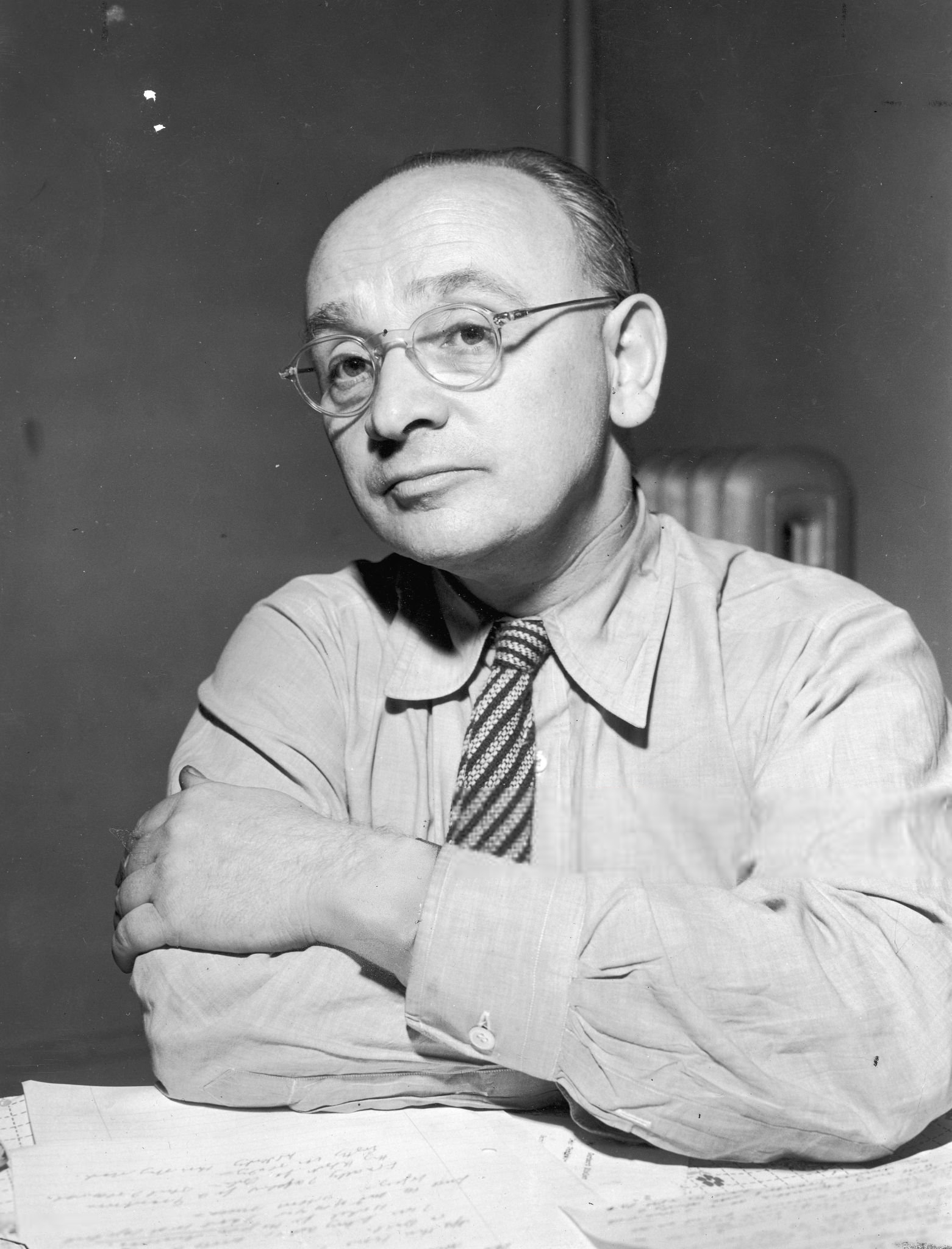
- Eisler in 1946

Chairman of the State Committee for Broadcasting
- In office 30 March 1962 – 21 March 1968
- Preceded by: Hermann Ley
- Succeeded by: Reginald Grimmer

Member of the Provisional Volkskammer
- In office 30 May 1949 – 19 October 1950
- Preceded by: Multi-member district
- Succeeded by: Multi-member district

Personal details
- Born: 20 February 1897 Leipzig, Kingdom of Saxony, German Empire
- Died: 21 March 1968 (aged 71) Yerevan, Armenian SSR, Soviet Union
- Party: KPÖ (1918–1920); KPD (1920–1949); SED (after 1949)
- Spouse(s): Hede Tune (m. 1919; div. 1923) Elli Tune (m. 1923; div. 1933) Hilde Vogel-Rothstein (m. 1942)
- Children: Anna
- Parents: Rudolf Eisler (father); Marie Fischer (mother)
- Relatives: Hanns Eisler (brother); Ruth Fischer (sister)
- Education: University of Vienna

Military service
- Allegiance: Austria-Hungary
- Branch/service: Austro-Hungarian Army
- Years of service: 1915–1918
- Rank: Leutnant
- Battles/wars: World War I
- Espionage activity
- Allegiance: Soviet Union
- Service branch: Comintern; Main Intelligence Directorate
- Service years: 1929–1935; 1941–1946
- Central institution membership: 1949–1950, 1967–1968: Full member, Central Committee (Note: Party Executive Committee until 1950); 1927–1929, 1935–1937: Full member, KPD Politburo; Other offices held: 1956–1962: Deputy Chairman, State Committee for Broadcasting; 1949–1952: Head, Office for Information

Gerhart Eisler (20 February 1897 – 21 March 1968) was a German politician, editor and journalist. Along with his sister Ruth Fischer, he was a very early member of the Austrian German Communist Party (KPDÖ) and then a prominent member of the Communist Party of Germany during the Weimar Republic.

== Life and career ==
=== Early life ===
Eisler was born in Leipzig, the son of Marie Edith Fischer and Rudolf Eisler, a professor of philosophy at Leipzig but of Austrian nationality. His father was Jewish and his mother was Lutheran.

His brother was the leftist composer Hanns Eisler and his sister was Communist activist Ruth Fischer. In November 1918, Eisler returned from the front of World War I and joined the Austrian Communist Party under the influence of his older sister. In 1919, he married Hede Massing (1900–1981). In 1920, he followed his sister to Berlin, where in January 1921 he became associate editor of the Die Rote Fahne. It was Germany's leading left-wing newspaper.

=== Comintern agent ===
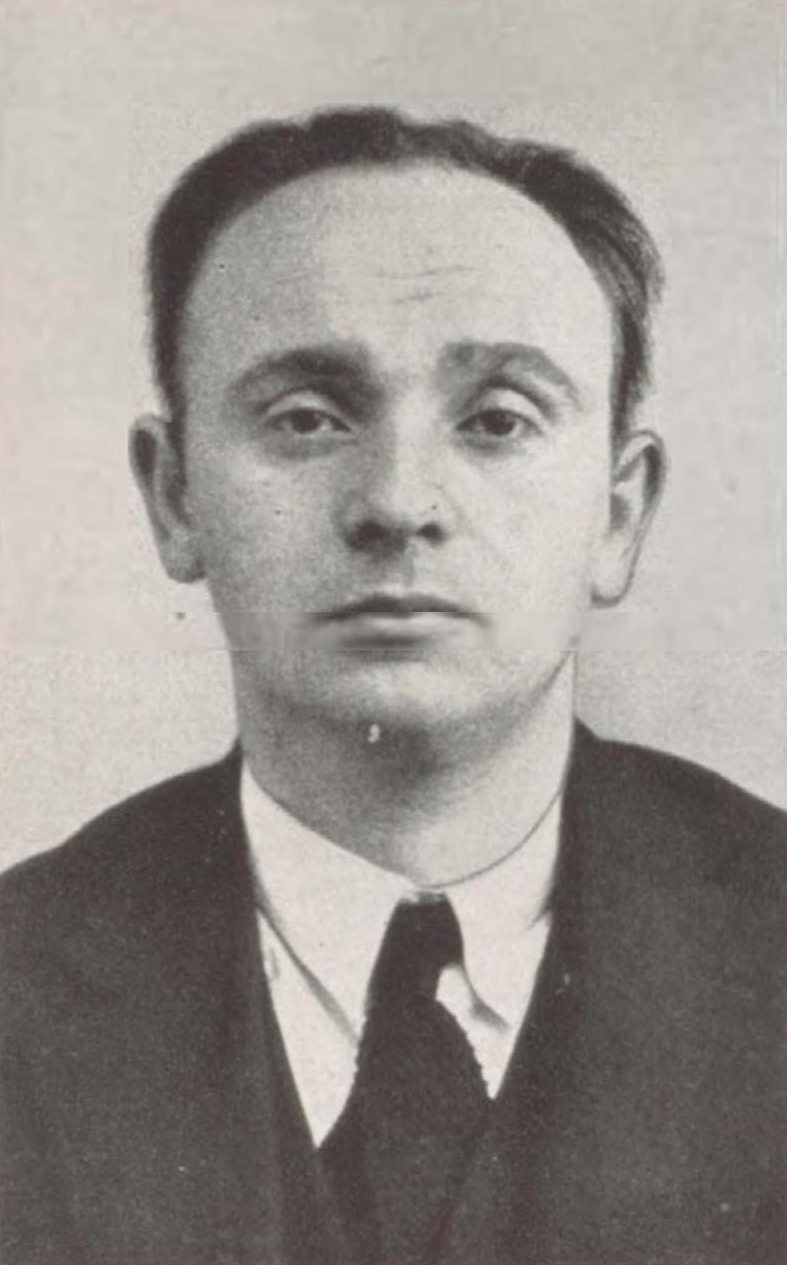
Eisler c. 1933

He left Hede in 1923 for her sister Elli Tune. Elli left him with their baby daughter Natasha in 1933, when she could no longer cope with the demands the Comintern made on him. In 1937, he met Hilde Vogel-Rothstein and they married in Queens, New York City in 1942. His first wife Hede and her third husband Paul Massing both spied for the Soviet Union in the USA and they all kept in touch. Hede Massing later turned towards the FBI and testified against Alger Hiss in his second trial.

Massing saw Eisler on his return to the Soviet Union: "Gerhart… was involved in the Wittdorf affair, a political maneuver to dethrone Ernst Thälmann, who was supported by Stalin…. Gerhart was, after a time, in complete isolation in Moscow, forbidden to read German papers in order to get Germany out of his system, and then sent as Comintern representative to China where, according to many reports, he achieved great success through his ruthless policy. He stepped back into Stalin's favor."

From 1929 to 1931, he was a liaison between the Communist International and the Communist Parties in China and then from 1933 to 1936 to the United States. Time reported in 1947 that he had made a trip to China in the late 1920s during which he earned the name "the executioner" for "purging the party of spies and dissidents".

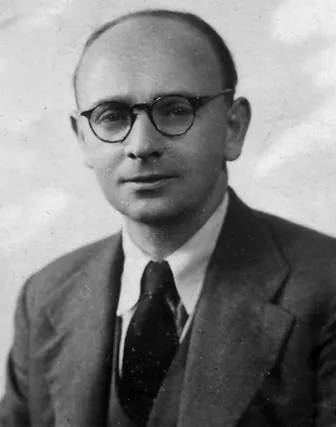
Eisler, undated

Eisler was charged in two trials in 1947 first with refusing to answer the HUAC, then of violating U.S. laws by misrepresenting his Communist Party affiliation on his immigration application. He was sentenced to one and three years in prison, but was soon released on bail. Newsweek described him in its 23 February 1948 issue as the "number one Red agent" (echoing Time magazine's "No. I U.S. Communist" from 1947).).

=== Escaping America ===
In 1948, Lee Pressman of New York and Joseph Forer of Washington, DC, represented Eisler along with Charles A. Doyle of the Gas, Coke and Chemical Workers Union; Irving Potash, vice president of the Fur and Leather Workers Union; Ferdinand C. Smith, secretary of the National Maritime Union; and John Williamson, labor secretary of the CPUSA. On 5 May 1948, Pressman and Forer received a preliminary injunction so their defendants might have hearings with examiners unconnected with the investigations and prosecutions by examiners of the Immigration and Naturalization Service.

When his last legal appeal failed, he jumped bail and secretly boarded the Polish liner MS Batory bound for London in early May 1949. He was discovered by the crew only after the ship was at sea. Once in England, he was dragged off the ship by his hands and feet; the authorities allowed him to leave for the German Democratic Republic.

=== Senior East German official ===
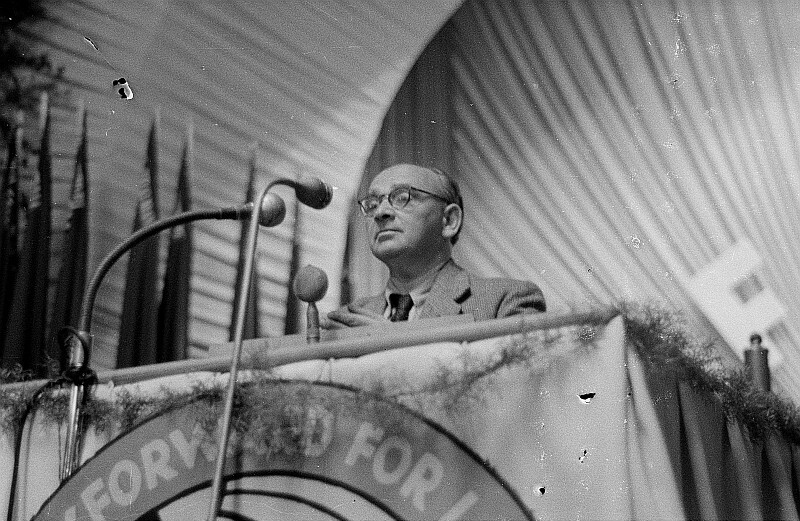
Eisler in East Germany in 1949

Eisler became a member of the party executive of the Socialist Unity Party of Germany and the Volkskammer in 1949, serving in both position until 1950. In the course of the establishment of the SED rule, he informed his colleagues at the party executive committee meeting on October 4, 1949 that, as Marxists, they must know: “If we found a government, we will never give it up again, neither through elections nor through others Methods". Until 1953 he was responsible for the management of the press and radio in the GDR government. Because of sympathizing with the opponents of SED party leader Walter Ulbricht before and during the uprising on June 17, 1953, he was deposed, but rehabilitated in 1955.

From 1956 to 1962 Eisler was deputy chairman and then until his death chairman of the State Committee for Broadcasting, and from 1967 he was a member of the Central Committee of the SED. There he was one of the most innovative leading figures in the GDR media apparatus: for example, he set up the DT 64 youth studio, which he also protected from attacks from the party.

== Legacy ==
After his death during an official visit in Yerevan, Armenia, several schools and streets in the German Democratic Republic were named in his honor. His cremation urn was placed at the Zentralfriedhof Friedrichsfelde in Berlin. Files from the UK National Archives released on 4 March 2008 included information about Gerhart Eisler. The MI5 summary states:

Eisler, who was supposed by many to be the covert leader and director of the Communist Party in America during and after the Second World War, became the centre of a diplomatic incident in 1949 when, having stowed away on a Polish ship out of New York, he was forcibly removed and arrested in Southampton. This file documents the Security Service's involvement in the case. The earliest traces of Eisler in the file (KV 2/2773, 1936–1949) date from 1936, when Comintern efforts to secure a false American passport in the name of Edwards were reported. In 1947 information obtained from Eisler's former wife, Hedwiga Messing, suggested that Eisler had used this cover name in New York in 1934.

An allegation from former Communist Louis F. Budenz that Lillian Hellman hosted a dinner party for Eisler the night before he stowed away on the Batory was instrumental in labeling her an active Communist and in the subsequent dismissal of John F. Melby from the U.S. State Department in 1953.

== Works ==
- The Lesson of Germany: A Guide to Her History (1945)
- Eisler Hits Back: A Reply to Rankin Men (1946)
- Five Men on a Hunger Strike (1949)
- "Foreign Ideas" in Fighting Words (1949)
- Wir reden hier nicht von Napoleon: Wir reden von Ihnen! (1971)
- Auf der Hauptstraße der Weltgeschichte (1981)
