= Stolen Lives Project =

Police watchdog group

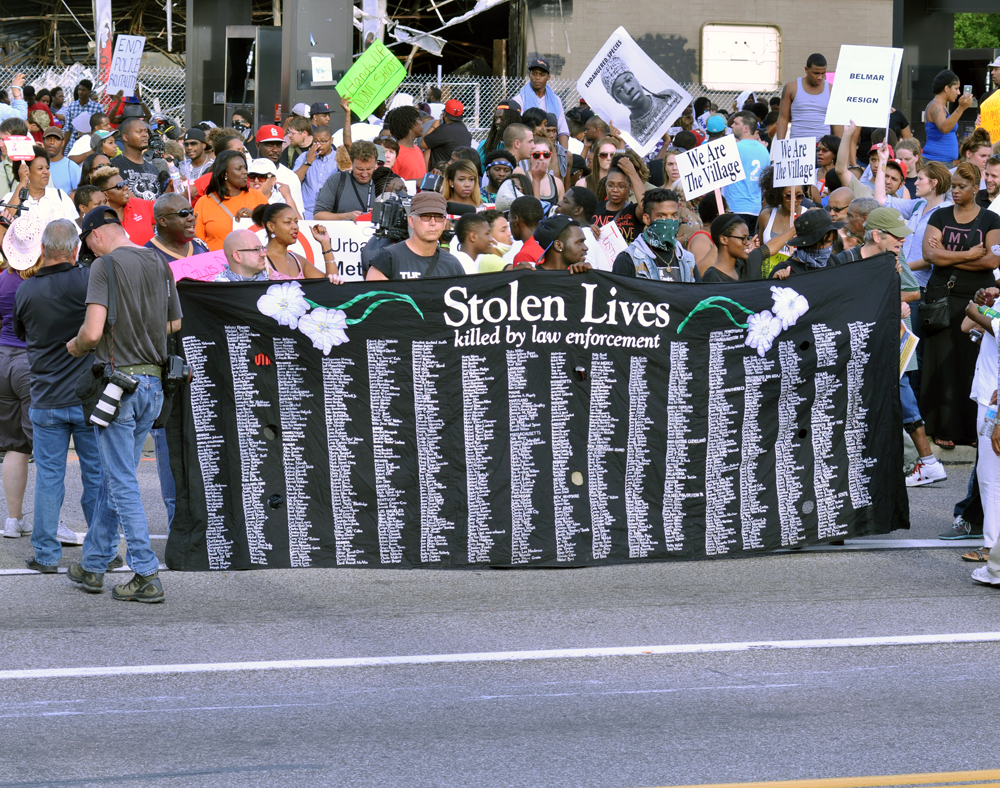
- Protestors holding up a Stolen Lives Project banner listing people killed by policemen.
- Formation: 1990
- Location: United States
- Website: stolenlives.org

The Stolen Lives Project is a watchdog group for deaths from police brutality in the United States. The group collects data on people who have died from the police and Border Patrol. Current supporters of the group include the National Lawyers Guild, the Anthony Baez Foundation, and the Center for Constitutional Rights.

== History ==
The Stolen Lives project was created in 1990 in response to inaccurate public reporting of deaths due to police brutality and a lack of a nationwide body dedicated to reporting police brutality deaths. In an attempt to improve accountability, SLP encourages people to send photographs, names, and narrative accounts of individuals killed by the police, and has won awards for its thorough documentation of police brutality. In the 1990s, the Stolen Lives Project documented approximately 200 police killings per year.

== Activity ==
The Stolen Lives Project, along with other police brutality watchdog groups, has organized a national day of protest against police brutality since 1996. Every year, the project holds a ceremony to present families of victims with certificates recognizing their loss. The Stolen Lives book published a print version of the group's database; the second edition was published in 1999. Further updates on the second edition were provided in the 2000s, in addition to state-specific versions.

== See also ==
- Lists of killings by law enforcement officers in the United States
