= National Lawyers Guild =

American association of lawyers

- Formation: 1937
- Type: Legal society
- Headquarters: 132 Nassau St., Ste 922, New York, New York
- Location: United States
- President: Suzanne Adely
- Key people: Xavier T. de Janon, Executive Director
- Website: nlg.org

The National Lawyers Guild (NLG) is a progressive public interest association of lawyers, law students, paralegals, jailhouse lawyers, law collective members, and other activist legal workers in the United States. The group was founded in 1937 as an alternative to the American Bar Association (ABA), in protest of that organization's then exclusionary membership practices and conservative political orientation. They were the first predominantly white US bar association to admit minorities to their ranks. The group sought to bring more lawyers closer to the labor movement and progressive political activities (e.g., the Farmer–Labor Party movement), to support and encourage lawyers otherwise "isolated and discouraged", and to help create a "united front" against fascism.

Upon its formation in 1937, the organization aimed to provide a progressive and racially integrated alternative to the ABA. Shortly thereafter, New Dealers and civil libertarians split from the organization, making it more left-wing. In its early days some of its members also belonged to the Communist Party.

The group declares itself to be "dedicated to the need for basic and progressive change in the structure of our political and economic system ... to the end that human rights shall be regarded as more sacred than property interests." During the McCarthy era, Attorney General Herbert Brownell Jr. and the House Un-American Activities Committee accused the organization of operating as a communist front group.

== History ==
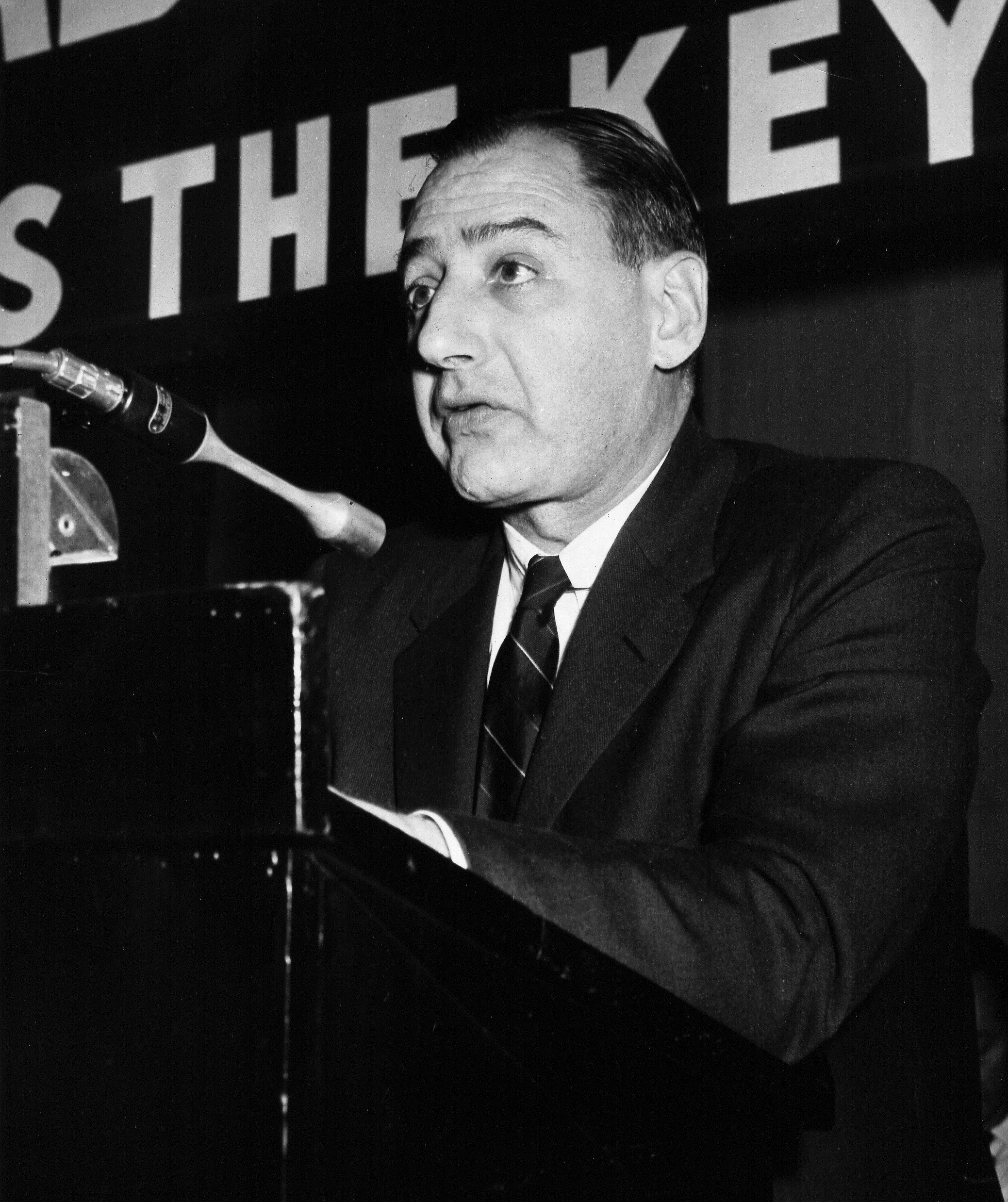
Harold I. Cammer, a co-founder of the National Lawyers Guild

=== 1930s ===
On December 1, 1936, nearly 25 East Coast lawyers met at the City Club of New York to discuss creation of a new group counter to the conservative American Bar Association. United Auto Workers general counsel Maurice Sugar was instrumental in calling the meeting. Lawyers present included: Morris Ernst, Robert Silberstein and Mortimer Reimer of the Lawyers Security League, ACLU attorney Osmond Fraenkel, IJA-US founder Carol Weiss King, and union lawyer Henry Sacher. The group agreed on an aim to unite "all lawyers who regarded adjustments to new conditions as more important than the veneration of precedent, who recognize the importance of safeguarding and extending the right of workers and farmers upon whom the welfare of the entire nation depends, of maintaining our civil rights and liberties and our democratic institutions". The group elected Frank P. Walsh, member of the New York State Power Authority, as its first president.

The National Lawyers Guild was founded in Washington, D.C., at a convention held from February 19–22, 1937, at the Hotel Washington. Individuals particularly instrumental in the creation of the organization included Harold I. Cammer and George Wagman Fish, among others. Other founding members included Frank P. Walsh, Albert Wald, Morris Ernst, Jerome Frank, as well as the general counsels of the American Federation of Labor and the Congress of Industrial Organizations. Another co-founder was Abraham Unger of New York City. Other charter members included John McTernan and Ben Margolis of Los Angeles. Another early member was Bartley Crum, defender of the Hollywood Ten. The first Executive Secretary of the organization was Mortimer Riemer. President Franklin D. Roosevelt sent a letter of support:

I am sure that the results of this meeting will be worth while. It is a time for progressive and constructive thinking, and having known most of you intimately for many years, I have every confidence that your deliberations will affect the welfare of your own profession and the well-being of the country at large. I send to you my hearty felicitations and warm personal regards.

According to Victor Rabinowitz, head of the NLG in the 1960s, the original membership of the organization came from two camps — established liberal attorneys with a labor-oriented perspective and "a militant segment of the bar, mostly young and sometimes radical". The National Lawyers Guild was the nation's first racially integrated bar association. Among the NLG's first causes was its support of President Roosevelt's New Deal, which was opposed by the American Bar Association (ABA). NLG assisted the emerging labor movement, and opposed the racial segregation policies in the ABA and in society in general. Following the Nazis' invasion of the Soviet Union, the Guild gave its support to President Roosevelt's wartime policies, including that of Japanese American internment.

Before mid-March 1937, within two weeks of its founding, the NLG formed chapters in New York City, Newark, Detroit, Boston, Philadelphia, Washington, St. Louis, and Chicago.

According to historian Harvey Klehr, the NLG was allied with the Communist Party; in the 1930s a significant number of NLG founders had been members or fellow travelers of the Communist Party USA, including Riemer and Joseph Brodsky of the CP's International Labor Defense auxiliary. During the McCarthy era, the NLG was accused by Attorney General Herbert Brownell Jr. as well as the House Un-American Activities Committee of being a Communist front organization.

In 1937, Allan R. Rosenberg joined the NLG and remained a member as late as 1956 during his second appearance before HUAC.

In 1937, Ferdinand Pecora was a founding member of the NLG. On March 1, 1938, Pecora become NLG president, noted as a "forceful speaker". Pecora resigned from the NLG during its third annual convention in 1939 after the vote against his resolution disavowing Communists failed to carry in the national vote.

By 1939, Assistant Secretary of State Adolf A. Berle was a Guild member. According to the NLG's A History of the National Lawyers Guild 1937–1987, two factions arose as early as 1940. External events driving these factions included the Spanish Civil War (started 1936), the Hitler-Stalin Pact (1939), and the Russian invasion of Finland (1940). One faction, led by Berle and Ernst, supported New Deal policies. The other, led by Osmond Fraenkel and Thomas I. Emerson, supported freedom of speech and press as well as Anti-Fascism (seen at the time as a Popular Front stance, thus pro-Communist). Other issues supported by Fraenkel, Emerson, the National Executive Board and many chapters included: support for Loyalist Spain, criticism of J. Edgar Hoover and the FBI, and support for labor unions. Berle and Ernst recommended anti-Communist oaths, which Fraenkel and Emerson opposed. Many Berle and Ernst supporters left the NLG by 1940. During the NLG's 1940 convention, newly elected president Robert W. Kenny of California and secretary Martin Popper of New York sought to persuade members to return. During a phone call from Kenny, Berle gave him a short list of lawyers to leave as a simple matter of "cleaning house": Kenny rejected the request. David Scribner, civil rights and labor lawyer, was a member of both the IJA and the NLG.

=== 1940s ===
Federal Bureau of Investigation director J. Edgar Hoover repeatedly tried to get successive Attorneys General to declare the NLG a "subversive organization", but without success.

In 1944 the Special House Un-American Activities Committee (HUAC) chaired by Texas Congressman Martin Dies Jr. published a brief history of the NLG in its massive and controversial "Appendix — Part IX" cataloging so-called "Communist Front Organizations" and their supporters. This report charged that the NLG, despite being promoted as a "professional organization of liberal lawyers" had proven itself by its actions to be "just one more highly deceptive Communist-operated front organization, primarily intended to serve the interests of the Communist Party of the United States..."

The 1944 HUAC history asserted that the NLG was merely "a streamlined edition of the International Juridical Organization", a Communist Party mass organization established in 1931. The document charged that "the National Lawyers Guild has faithfully followed the line of the Communist Party on numerous issues and has proven itself an important bulwark in defense of that party, its members, and organizations under its control." Particularly damning in HUAC's eyes was the NLG's reversal of position on the war in Europe after the June 22, 1941 invasion of the Soviet Union by the forces of Nazi Germany, with an October resolution by the previously anti-war organization offering "unlimited support to all measures necessary to the defeat of Hitlerism" and supporting the Roosevelt administration's policy of "'all out aid' and full collaboration with Great Britain, the Soviet Union, China, and other nations resisting Fascist aggression."

=== 1950s ===
In January 1950, the NLG published a report for US President Harry S. Truman that accused the FBI of "systematic search by illegal methods" into the politics of thousands of private citizens, reported the Washington Post. The report focused on FBI methods used against Soviet spy Judith Coplon. The report recommended that the President stop such practices. It also recommended that the President appoint a committee of private citizens to investigate the FBI. Contributors to the report were NLG president Clifford J. Durr, Frederick K. Beutel, Thomas I. Emerson, O. John Rogge, James A. Cobb, Joseph Forer, and Robert J. Silberstein.

On September 21, 1950, HUAC responded with Report on the National Lawyers Guild: Legal Bulwark of the Communist Party. The HUAC report accused the NLG of playing a part in "an overall Communist strategy aimed at weakening our nation's defenses against the international Communist conspiracy." The report advocated that Guild members be barred from federal employment in light of the organization's alleged subversive character.

From 1951 to 1954, Earl B. Dickerson served as the first black president of the National Lawyers Guild. Dickerson was instrumental in contesting the proposed classification of the National Lawyers Guild as a "subversive organization".

In 1954, the NLG New York chapter elected Frank Serri as president. Other officers included: Hubert T. Delany, Osmond K. Fraenkel, Leo J. Linder, Harold M. Phillips, David L. Weissman, Julius Cohen, and Simon Schachter. Directors included: Bella Abzug, Gloria Agrin, Michael B. Atkins, Benjamin H. Booth, Edward J. Cambridge, Harold Cammer, William B. Cherevas, George H. Cohen, Frank Donner, Issac C. Donner, Stanley Faulkner, Royal W. France, Nathan Frankel, Doris Peterson Galen, Murray Gordon, Charles Haydon, Lazaar Henkin, Bernard L. Jaffe, H. Leonard King, Rhoda Lakes, Mendel Lurie, Edward J. Malament, Stanley J. Mayer, Basil Pollitt, Samuel Rosenberg, Arnold E. Rosenblum, Barney Rosenstein, Simon Rosenstein, Mildred Roth, Harry Sacher, Arthur Schutzer, Elias M. Schwarzbart, Moses B. Sherr, Kenneth L. Shorter, Leonard P. Simpson, Lorna Rissler Wallach, and Henry R. Wolf.

In 1958, the US Government determined that the NLG could not be declared subversive.

=== 1970s–1990s ===
Again in 1974, the US Government determined that the NLG could not be declared subversive.

Lawyers from the NLG were the biggest source of funding of the Weather Underground, a far left militant group.

In 1977, at the request of Arab-American lawyers, the NLG sent a delegation to the occupied Palestinian Territories and published its findings in a 1978 report: "Treatment of Palestinians in Israeli-Occupied West Bank and Gaza".

In 1989 the FBI admitted its continued efforts to investigate and disrupt the NLG in the period from 1940 to 1975.

=== 2000s ===
In the 2000s, the NLG opposed the PATRIOT Act, corporate globalization, the World Trade Organization, and has called for the adoption of "the Plan of Action from the 2001 UN World Conference Against Racism, Xenophobia, and Related Intolerance." The NLG has also helped to train and provide legal observers for political demonstrations. The NLG has supported Palestinian rights and a number of other causes.

In 2005, NLG member Lynne Stewart was found guilty of violating Special Administrative Measures imposed on her client Omar Abdel Rahman and was sentenced in 2010 to 10 years in prison. The NLG mounted a campaign on her behalf.

In November 2007, the NLG passed a resolution calling for the impeachment of then President George W. Bush and Vice President Dick Cheney.

=== 2010s ===
In 2011, the NLG defended the Occupy movement in the United States, making use of temporary restraining orders on behalf of encamped activists in an effort to forestall the forced dispersal of their sites by law enforcement. Charging that the Occupy movement was the subject of a "coordinated national crackdown", NLG lawyers filed actions in Boston, New York City, San Diego, Fort Myers, Atlanta, and other cities seeking the temporary prohibition of site removal efforts.

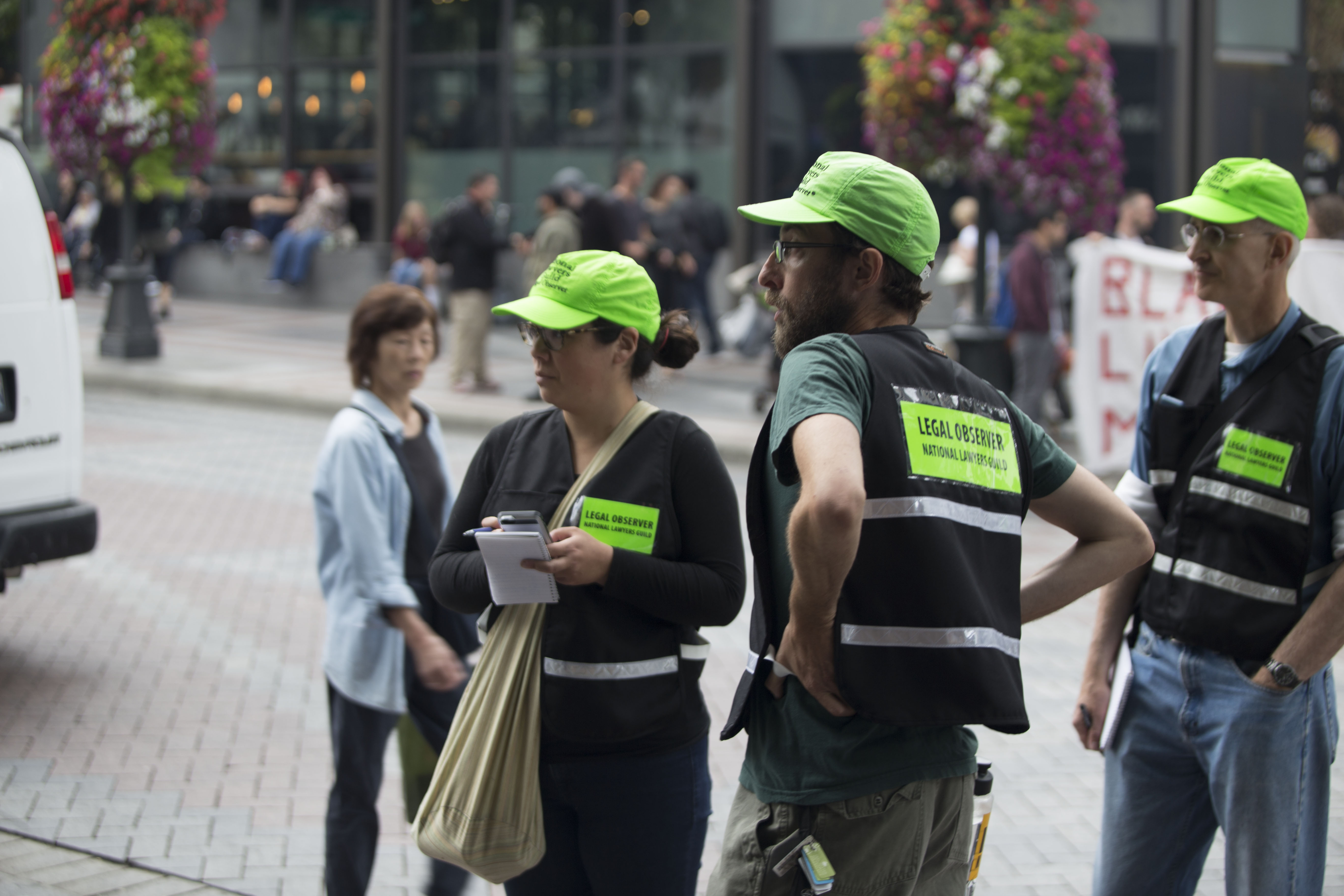
National Lawyers Guild legal observers, in trademark green hats, at a 2017 Solidarity Against Hate demonstration in Seattle

=== 2020s ===
On October 8, 2023, one day after the Hamas-led attack on Israel, the NLG International Committee published a statement, which stated that "[a]t this historic moment" they reiterate the rightfulness of the Palestinian struggle against "occupation by all available means, including armed struggle", based on United Nations General Assembly Resolution 37/43. On that day, the NLG declaration spoke of "illegal military occupation, apartheid and ethnic cleansing", and "urge[d] the United States to stop enabling and arming Israel’s perpetration of its atrocities." In this context, The Times of Israel qualifies the NLG as "anti-Israel."

During the ensuing Israel-Hamas conflict in 2023, the Palestinian Subcommittee became a target of the American Republican Party. A joint letter from Commissioner of the Federal Acquisition Service of the General Service Administration Josh Gruenbaum, Acting General Council of HHS Sean Keveny, and Acting General Council of the US DOE Thomas Wheeler sent to Harvard on April 11, 2025, implicated The National Lawyers Guild, saying "Harvard must end support and recognition of those student groups or clubs that engaged in anti-Semitic activity since October 7th, 2023, including ... the National Lawyers Guild, and discipline and render ineligible the officers and active members of those student organizations."

Commenting on the contested 2024 Venezuelan presidential election, the NLG's president, Suzanne Adely, said the elections "were not only fair and transparent but also represented an example of popular civic participation. Their successful outcome is a triumph for the Venezuelan people, especially considering the level of U.S. interference and attempted sabotage of the democratic process, particularly through sanctions and coercive economic measures aimed at producing 'regime change' in Venezuela".

== Structure ==
Past Guild presidents have included Dobby Walker (the first female president of the NLG, first serving in 1970 and member of the 1972 "Dream Team" that successfully defended Angela Davis using innovative litigation techniques that are now mainstream), Marjorie Cohn (a law professor at Thomas Jefferson School of Law and author), and Azadeh Shahshahani (the first woman of color to lead the NLG and a human rights attorney who defends the rights of immigrants and Muslims in the U.S. South). Heidi Boghosian served as its executive director for 15 years, from 1999 to 2014.

Full membership in the NLG is open to lawyers, law students, legal workers (including legal secretaries, legal investigators, paralegals, law collective members, and jailhouse lawyers). Prior to the 1972 NLG National Convention, held in Boulder, Colorado, membership was only open to lawyers. Members now include labor organizers, tribal sovereignty activists, civil liberties advocates, civil rights advocates, environmentalists, and G.I. rights counselors.

The NLG is affiliated with the International Association of Democratic Lawyers. It has supported the Stolen Lives Project, which documents police brutality.

=== Funding ===
The NLG is a dues-paying membership organization, with income-based sliding scale rates ranging from $25 to $800 per annum used in 2020.

=== Publications ===
The first journal of the NLG was the National Lawyers Guild Quarterly, first issued in December 1937 and then terminated in July 1940. This was succeeded in October 1940 by a new quarterly called Lawyers Guild Review, which was published continuously through 1960. The publication's editorial office was moved to Los Angeles and its name was briefly changed from 1961 through 1964 to Law in Transition, followed by a change in 1965 to Guild Practitioner. In 2009, the journal once again changed name to National Lawyers Guild Review, shortening to NLG Review. With the Center for Constitutional Rights, the NLG published a revised Jailhouse Lawyers Handbook, and annually distributes thousands of copies to inmates seeking legal information and resources.

== See also ==
- International Labor Defense
- International Juridical Association
- Center for Constitutional Rights (CCR)
- American Bar Association
- American Constitution Society
- Federalist Society

== Sources ==
- Martin Dies (chairman of Special Committee on Un-American Activities). "145. National Lawyers Guild", pp. 1267–1279 in Appendix — Part IX: Communist Front Organizations, with Special Reference to the National Citizens Political Action Committee (Fourth Section and Fifth Section: pp. 1049–1648) of Investigation of Un-American Propaganda Activities in the United States: Special Committee on Un-American Activities, House of Representatives, Seventy-Eighth Congress, Second Session, on H. Res. 282. Washington, DC: United States Government Printing Office, 1944
- Ann Fagan Ginger and Eugene M. Tobin (editors); Ramsey Clark (foreword). The National Lawyers Guild: From Roosevelt Through Reagan. Philadelphia: Temple University Press, 1988. ISBN 0877224889
- Victor Rabinowitz and Tim Ledwith (editors), A History of the National Lawyers Guild: 1937–1987 (New York: National Lawyers Guild, 1987)
- John S. Wood (chair of the House Un-American Activities Committee). Report on the National Lawyers Guild: Legal Bulwark of the Communist Party (Report No. 3123 of the 81st Congress, 2nd Session, of the House of Representatives). Washington, DC: Committee on Un-American Activities of the U. S. House of Representatives, 1950.
