= Folkenflik =

Folkenflik is a surname. Notable people with the surname include:

- David Folkenflik (born 1969), American reporter
- Vivian Folkenflik (1940–2023), American educator and translator
