= Sybil Shainwald =

American lawyer (1928–2025)

- Born: April 27, 1928; New York City, U.S.
- Died: April 9, 2025 (aged 96); New York City, U.S.
- Education: College of William and Mary BA 1948; Columbia University MA 1972; New York Law School JD 1976
- Occupations: Attorney, women's health rights activist, writer, lecturer
- Known for: Former chair of the National Women's Health Network, co-founder of Health Action International and Trial Lawyers for Public Justice

Sybil Shainwald (April 27, 1928 – April 9, 2025) was an American attorney specializing in women's health law and an activist for women's health reform. She represented thousands of women and their children in individual and class action suits against manufacturers of harmful drugs, devices, and procedures. Shainwald was former chair of the National Women's Health Network, co-founder of Health Action International and Trial Lawyers for Public Justice.

== Personal life and education ==
Shainwald was born in New York City to Morris and Anne Brodkin, children of Russian Jewish immigrants. She graduated from James Madison High School in Brooklyn and at 16 entered William and Mary College in Williamsburg, Virginia. She graduated first in her class with a BA in history in 1948 and then taught in New York City and New Rochelle, New York, schools while raising four children. In 1960 she married CPA and consumer advocate Sidney Shainwald. She then attended graduate school at Columbia University where she received her M.A. in history in 1972, focusing on the consumer movement. In 1972 she was awarded a National Endowment for the Humanities grant to establish the Center for the Study of the Consumer Movement at Consumers Union, which she directed from 1972 to 1978. Concurrently, she attended New York Law School's evening division, where she earned her J.D. degree in 1976. Shainwald died on April 9, 2025, at the age of 96.

== Law career ==
Shainwald first became a trial assistant in the law office of Alfred S. Julien in New York City. In the late 1970s, as co-counsel, she successfully represented Joyce Bichler in Bichler v. Lilly. Bichler, who at 17 had developed clear cell adenocarcinoma of the cervix and vagina requiring the removal of her reproductive organs, had brought a product liability action against the Eli Lilly pharmaceutical company for damages sustained through her mother's use of DES (diethylstilbestrol) while she was pregnant with her. This was the first case that held drug manufacturers liable for the health problems of children whose mothers had taken the synthetic estrogen drug DES to prevent miscarriage. The case was appealed by Lilly in 1979. Bichler turned down Lilly's settlement offer of $100,000 when Shainwald told her "that if money was not essential, and if she could hold out for a jury verdict, it would be a victory for women everywhere." Bichler won the appeal in 1982 and was awarded $500,000 by the jury.

Women's health reform became Shainwald's cause. Beginning in the late 1980s, Shainwald represented women whose silicone gel breast implants had leaked and caused a variety of autoimmune, neurological, and rheumatological problems. As a member of the Settlement Committee in the consolidated cases known as MDL 926, she was successful in setting up a $25 million fund for women outside the U.S. who were injured by faulty breast implants. Shainwald litigated cases involving various forms of birth control including the Dalkon Shield (an intrauterine device), representing 2,000 women in a class action against A.H. Robins Company, and was successful in getting equity for foreign women. She also litigated against birth control pills, the prenatal diagnostic test known as chorionic villus sampling, the lactation inhibitor Parlodel, the anti-obesity drug Fen-Phen, and other products detrimental to women's health.

In 1995, she represented women in state and federal class action suits against Wyeth-Ayerst Laboratories, the maker of Norplant, a hormone capsule implant designed as a long-acting contraceptive and used by about a million women. Shainwald claimed that it wasn't tested appropriately. In 1989 she had urged the FDA not to approve its sale when she testified before the agency on behalf of Health Action International, a consortium of health concerns. She warned of the device's serious problems, among them its removal, infection at the implant site, and unknown long-term side effects.

In 1996, Shainwald won a class action lawsuit that established a court-supervised program funded by the pharmaceutical companies that manufactured DES. The result was the establishment of an Emergency Fund for DES daughters that included compensation for, among other expenses, medical costs not reimbursed by insurance companies, psychological counseling, and costs relating to infertility due to DES exposure. The fund also provided for a DES education and outreach campaign aimed at the general public.

Shainwald was also instrumental in changing the statute of limitations for latent injuries in New York State to a discovery statute in 1986, and filed the first case under the Revival and Discovery Statute, which allowed dismissed cases to be refiled again for a period of one year.

== Health advocacy ==
Shainwald was chair of the National Women's Health Network in the 1980s, co-founder of Health Action International, a founding member of Trial Lawyers for Public Justice and a member of the FDA's Consumer Consortium. She was also involved with the Hysterectomy Educational Resources and Services (HERS) Foundation.

In addition to advocacy in the courtroom, Shainwald wrote, testified, and lectured about obstetrical malpractice, unnecessary hysterectomies, and product liability litigation. In the 1980s she traveled internationally to educate women on the toxicity of Depo Provera, a drug manufactured by Upjohn Corporation. Though not approved by the FDA for contraceptive use, these birth control shots, given every three months, were marketed in 80 foreign countries and, through legal loopholes, to poor, minority, and mentally incapacitated women in the U.S. as well. Shainwald estimated that 20,000 American women were prescribed this drug, linked to cancer in lab animals, as a contraceptive and to treat PMS and endometriosis, and were not told about its side effects. She called its distribution "human experimentation on a massive scale." Shainwald's writings and testimony before the FDA and Congress have had a significant impact in raising awareness on crucial women's health issues.

Shainwald received numerous awards for her advocacy, including the President's Medal from New York Law School in 2007, the Dean's Award from Columbia University (2009), the Susan B. Anthony Award from the National Organization for Women, Doctor of Laws – Honorary Degree from New York Law School in 2000, and the New York County Lawyers Association's 2010 Edith I. Spivak Award.

== Lecture series ==
In tribute to her late husband, Shainwald established the Sidney Shainwald Public Interest Lectures at New York Law School in 2004 to carry on their legacy of professionalism, ethics, and social responsibility. Speakers have included Senator Edward M. Kennedy, Laurence Tribe, U.S. Supreme Court Justices Sandra Day O'Connor, Ruth Bader Ginsburg and Stephen G. Breyer, former U.S. Senator and Secretary of Defense Chuck Hagel, Secretary of State John Kerry, former Speaker of the House Nancy Pelosi, and former Senate Majority Leader George J. Mitchell.
