= Jonathan Greenstein =

American antiques dealer

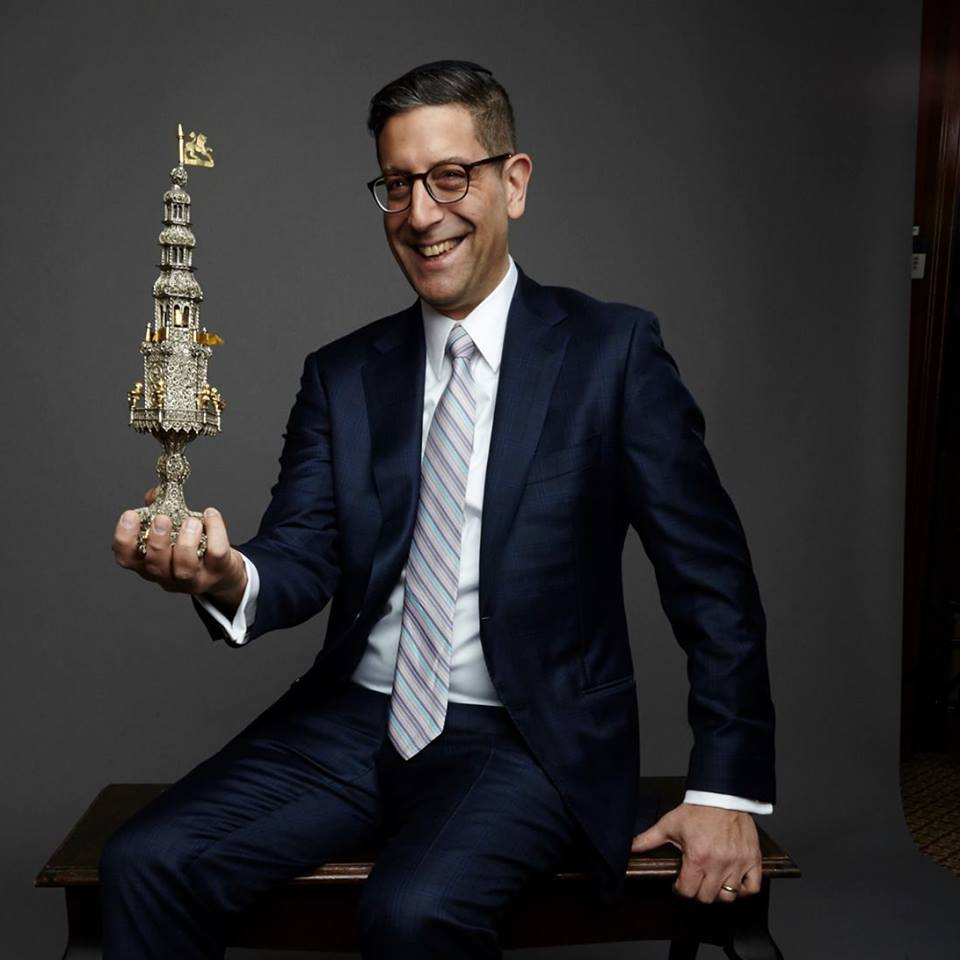
- Born: November 1, 1967 (age 58); New York City, US
- Education: Brooklyn College
- Occupations: President, J. Greenstein & Co. (2003-present); CEO, Mercy Home Care & Medical Supplies (1993-present)
- Spouse: Sima Greenstein
- Children: 5
- Website: www.jgreenstein.com

Jonathan Greenstein (born November 1, 1967) is an antique Judaica authentication expert. He is the owner, chief expert, and president of J. Greenstein & Company, an auction house in the United States dedicated to appraising and selling antique Judaica. Greenstein lives on Long Island, New York, with his wife and five children.

== Early life and education ==
Greenstein was born and raised in Brooklyn, New York, to Donald and Janice Greenstein. At 14, he left yeshiva in Flatbush, Brooklyn, transferred to James Madison High School, started working at The Gold Bug, and began collecting Judaica. He visited flea markets and garage sales to add to his Judaica collection, and eventually began dealing in antique Jewish ritual objects. He received his bachelor's and master's degrees in health administration from Brooklyn College.

== Career ==
=== J. Greenstein & Company ===
Greenstein auctioneered a charity auction in 2002 at the Park East Synagogue in New York City. He organized the pieces and made the catalog for the auction. Shortly after, he received an auctioneer's license and hosted his own auction.

In 2003, he founded J. Greenstein & Company in Brooklyn, New York. The Judaica retail gallery and auction house focuses on religious art from the 1600s to 1938. In 2010, Greenstein moved the company's headquarters to Cedarhurst, New York. By December 2012, 600 people, including billionaire hedge-fund manager and antiquities collector Michael Steinhardt, received Greenstein's auction catalogs. That year, he hosted Jewish Gilt, a Jewish antiques television show featured on The Jewish Channel.

In December 2014, Greenstein sold a Hanukkah menorah for 100,000 USD. The menorah was made in Ukraine during the eighteenth century. In 2016, J. Greenstein & Company hosted an auction featuring 232 rare objects including rare Judaica items belonging to Harvard law professor Alan Dershowitz. Greenstein acquired Zionist leader Ze'ev Jabotinsky's French refugee identification card, and his company auctioned it off in June 2017. J. Greenstein & Company has also hosted and sold celebrity Judaica including Sammy Davis Jr.'s personal menorah, Rabbi Shlomo Carlebach's piano, a Seder plate that belonged to Joan Rivers, and items from victims of the Bernard Madoff scandal.

In November 2018, J. Greenstein & Co. held an auction at the Antique Judaica & Jewish Art Gallery in Cedarhurst that included Marilyn Monroe's personal Jewish prayer book from 1956 (the year she married Arthur Miller and converted to Judaism), with notations in the margins likely written by the actress. The prayer book was published in 1922. It sold at the auction for 21,000 USD plus fees. At that auction they also sold Judaica from the collection of Jerry Lewis, with items on view at the gallery dating back as far as a Torah binder made in Italy in the 1690s.

=== Mercy Home Care and Medical Supplies ===
Greenstein is also the founder and CEO of Mercy Home Care and Medical Supplies, a medical equipment and disposables company located in Brooklyn, New York.
