= Maury Allen =

American sportswriter, actor, and newspaper columnist

- Born: Maurice Allen Rosenberg; May 2, 1932; Brooklyn, New York, U.S.
- Died: October 3, 2010 (aged 78)
- Education: City College of New York
- Occupations: Sportswriter, actor, columnist
- Spouse: Janet Allen
- Children: 2
- Writing career
- Language: English
- Period: 1959–2010
- Genre: Sports journalism
- Notable works: Brooklyn Remembered: The 1955 Days of the Dodgers, Mr. October: The Reggie Jackson Story, Damn Yankee: The Billy Martin Story
- Notable awards: Lifetime Achievement Award (Society of Silurians)

Allen

Maury Allen (born Maurice Allen Rosenberg; May 2, 1932 – October 3, 2010) was an American sportswriter, actor, and columnist for the New York Post and the Journal-News. He was also a voter for the Baseball Hall of Fame. Allen wrote 38 books on American sports icons. He also contributed to Thecolumnists.com.

== Early life ==
Allen was born in Brooklyn, New York, to parents Harry and Frances Rosenberg. Harry Rosenberg was a coffee salesman and Frances a homemaker. His grandparents came from Russia He attended James Madison High School where he covered sports for the school paper.

As a young man, Allen was a Brooklyn Dodgers fanatic. His book, Brooklyn Remembered: The 1955 Days of the Dodgers, recalls the glory days of the team, before they were moved to Los Angeles.

After high school, he attended City College of New York where he majored in journalism and played for the football team. Allen had one older brother. Following college, Allen was drafted into the Army. He served in Japan and in Korea during the Korean War.

== Sports journalism career ==
Allen wrote for the City College newspaper, The Campus, covering sports. When he was drafted to the Army, he continued as a reporter, writing for the Pacific Stars and Stripes. After his service, he wrote for papers in Indiana, Pennsylvania and New York.

In 1959, Allen was hired as sports writer at Sports Illustrated. He wrote for Sports Illustrated for two years. His next newspaper job was reporting for the New York Post from 1961 to 1988. From 1988 to 2000, he wrote articles for The Journal News, owned by the Gannett Company. Following his retirement from The Journal News, Allen continued to write books and to write articles for Thecolumnists.com.

=== Radio broadcasts ===
From 2002 to 2008, Allen co-hosted a weekly radio show called Talking Sports with Maury and Bill with the owner of Mickey Mantle's Restaurant, Bill Liederman. The show was broadcast live from Mickey Mantle's Restaurant, near Central Park in New York City. The one-hour long show featured sports talk and interviews with athletes. Allen was a contributor to a talk show hosted by Dave Cooperman and Bill Liederman called The Sports Buzz which was broadcast originally by WFAS-FM (2003–2004) in Westchester and then WCTC (2005–2007) in Central Jersey. Lori Rubinson from season 1 of ESPN's Dream Job and now a contributor on WFAN replaced Liederman. Cooperman and Rubinson moved the show to the WCTC studios and the show eventually was moved to the 5:00-7:00 time slot. Maury Allen remained a contributor through the life of the show.

=== Film appearances ===
Allen was interviewed on numerous occasions in documentary films, such as Toots (2006), Mantle (2006), City Dump: The Story of the 1951 CCNY Basketball Scandal (1998), and Howard Cosell: Telling It Like It Is (1999).

=== National Baseball Hall of Fame voter ===
Allen was a member of the Baseball Writers' Association of America, and was a voter for the National Baseball Hall of Fame for 35 years. He became eligible to vote in 1973 after more than 10 years as a traveling sports reporter.

=== Later work ===
Allen completed work on a book entitled "Dixie Walker of the Dodgers", a right fielder for the Yankees, White Sox, and Brooklyn Dodgers, and controversial figure in baseball in the 1940s for his stance against racial integration in Major League Baseball, which was released in 2010.

=== Publications ===
- Sports Illustrated, 1959–1961
- New York Post, 1961–1988
- Journal-News, 1988–2000
- The Columnists.com, 2001–?

== Personal life ==
In 1962, Maury Allen married Janet Allen. They had two children, daughter Jennifer, and son Ted and four grandchildren. Prior to retirement, Allen was an avid tennis player. Friends and acquaintances often joked that Allen could be counted on to show up for tennis any day of the year. Allen died of lymphoma at the age of 78.

== Awards and honors ==
Allen was granted a Lifetime Achievement Award by the Society of Silurians, one of the oldest journalistic organizations in existence. He was inducted into the B'nai B'rith Sports Hall of Fame, City College of New York Hall of Fame, the International Jewish Sports Hall of Fame, the James Madison High Hall of Fame, the Westchester County New York Hall of Fame, and the Brooklyn Dodgers Hall of Fame. On November 9, 2011, he was posthumously awarded the Townsend Harris Medal by the Alumni Association of City College of New York.

== Bibliography ==
- Dixie Walker of the Dodgers, with Susan Walker and published by the University of Alabama Press
- Yankees World Series Memories
- Our Mickey: Cherished Memories of an American Icon
- Brooklyn Remembered: The 1955 Days of the Dodgers, co-author Bob Costas
- Mr. October: The Reggie Jackson Story
- Damn Yankee: The Billy Martin Story
- You Could Look It Up
- Big-Time Baseball
- Where Have You Gone, Joe DiMaggio?
- Bo: Pitching and Wooing
- Memories of the Mick: Baseball's Legend
- Voices of Sport
- Now Wait a Minute, Casey
- The Record Breakers
- The Incredible Mets
- After the Miracle
- Joe Namath's Sportin' Life
- Reprieve From Hell
- The Three Million Dollar Man
- Louisiana Lightning
- Jim Rice: Power Hitter
- China Spy
- A Sword in the Temple
- Slick
- Sweet Lou
- Ten Great Moments in Sports
- All Roads Lead to October
- Baseball's 100
- Jackie Robinson: A Life Remembered
- Baseball: The Lives Behind the Seams
- Greatest Pro Quarterbacks
- Yankees: Where Have You Gone?
- Baseball's 100
- Ron Guidry: Louisiana Lightning
- " Roger Maris: A Man For All Seasons"

== ESPN credits ==
- The Top 5 Reasons You Can't Blame Ralph Branca for Losing the 1951 Pennant
- Yogi Berra
- George Steinbrenner
- Roger Maris
- Reggie Jackson
- Joe DiMaggio

== See also ==
- List of Jewish American authors

== Notes ==
- Complete Bibliography of Maury Allen Books
- Macmillan Publishing: Maury Allen
- Doris S. Michaels Literary Agency, Inc.
