= Political views of Albert Einstein =

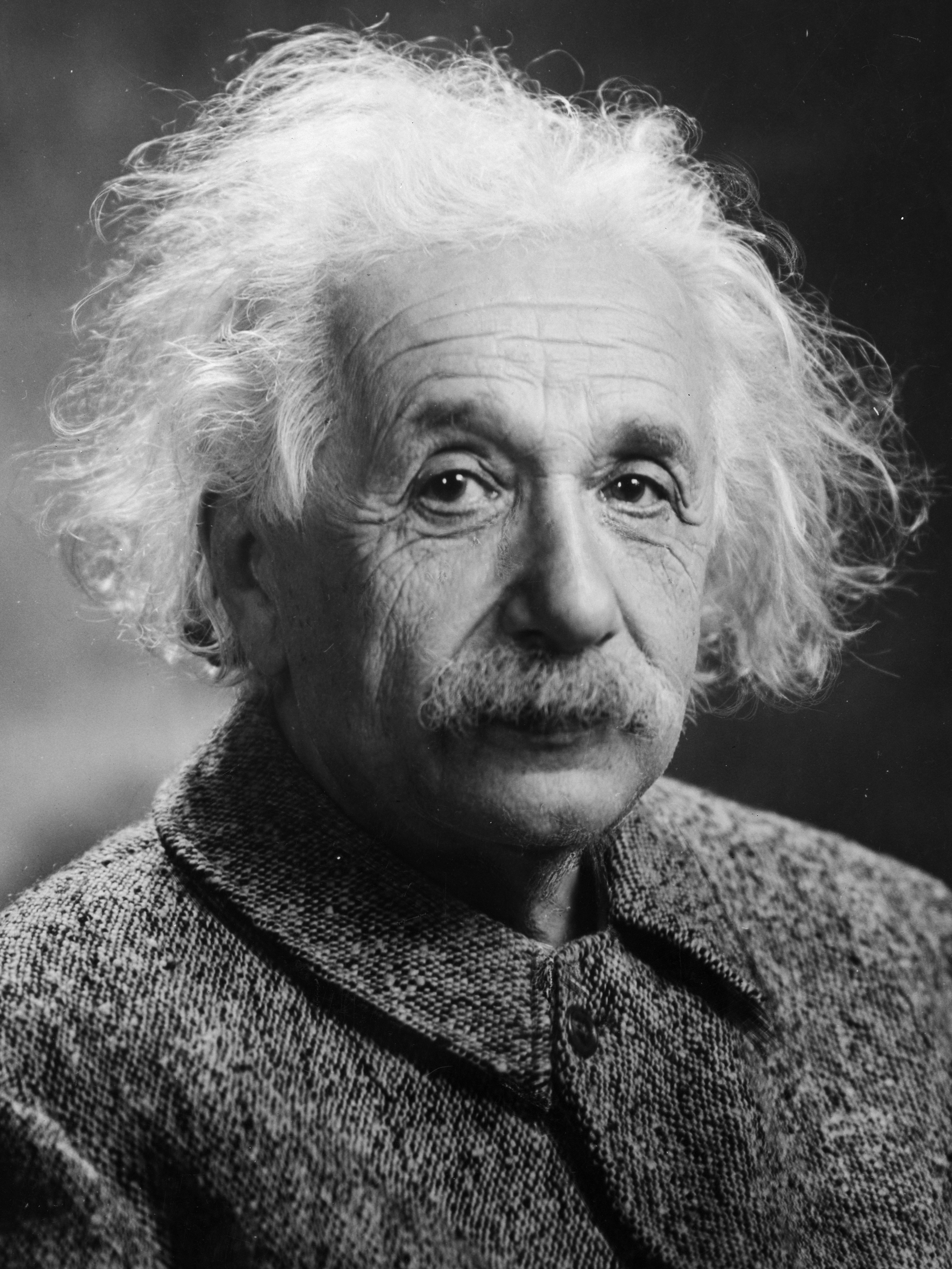
Einstein in 1947

German-born scientist Albert Einstein (1879-1955) was best known during his lifetime for his development of the theory of relativity, his contributions to quantum mechanics, and many other notable achievements in modern physics. However, Einstein's political views also garnered much public interest due to his fame and involvement in political, humanitarian, and academic projects around the world. Einstein was a peace activist and a firm advocate of global federalism and world law. He favoured the principles of socialism, asserting that it was an ideological system that fixed what he perceived as the inherent societal shortcomings of capitalism.

This became especially apparent in his later life, when he detailed his economic views in a 1949 article titled "Why Socialism?" for the independent socialist magazine Monthly Review. He was critical of the methods employed by Vladimir Lenin and the Bolsheviks during the Russian Revolution, stating that they did not have a "well-regulated system of government" and had instead established a "regime of terror" over the fallen Russian Empire. His visible position in society allowed him to speak and write frankly, even provocatively, at a time when many people were being silenced across the European continent due to the swift rise of Nazism in Germany.

In January 1933, Adolf Hitler assumed office as Germany's leader while Einstein was visiting the United States. Einstein, an Ashkenazi Jew, was staunchly opposed to the policies of the Nazi government, and after his family was repeatedly harassed by the Gestapo, he renounced his German citizenship and permanently relocated to the United States, becoming an American citizen in 1940. Though he held a generally positive view of the country's culture and values, he frequently objected to the systematic mistreatment of African Americans and became active in their civil rights movement. As a Labor Zionist, Einstein supported the Palestinian Jews of the Yishuv. However, he did not support the establishment of a Jewish state or an Arab state to replace Mandatory Palestine, instead asserting that he would "much rather see agreement with the Arabs on the basis of living together in peace than the creation of a Jewish state".

== Germany ==
=== German Empire and World War I ===
Born in Ulm, Einstein was a German citizen from birth. As he grew older, Einstein's pacifism often clashed with the German Empire's militant views at the time. At the age of 17, Einstein renounced his German citizenship and moved to Switzerland to attend college. The loss of Einstein's citizenship allowed him to avoid service in the military, which suited his pacifist views. In response to a Manifesto of the Ninety-Three signed by 93 leading German intellectuals including Max Planck in support of the German war effort, Einstein and three others wrote a counter-manifesto. Einstein accepted a position at the University of Berlin in 1914, returning to Germany where he spent his time during the rest of World War I. Einstein also reacquired his German citizenship. In the years after the war, Einstein was very vocal in his support for Germany. In 1918, Einstein was one of the signatories of the founding proclamation of the German Democratic Party, a liberal party. In 1921, Einstein refused to attend the third Solvay Congress in Belgium, as his German compatriots were excluded. In 1922, Einstein joined a committee sponsored by the League of Nations, but quickly left when the League refused to act on France's occupation of the Ruhr in 1923. As a member of the German League of Human Rights, Einstein worked hard to repair relations between Germany and France.

=== Rise of Adolf Hitler's Nazi Party ===
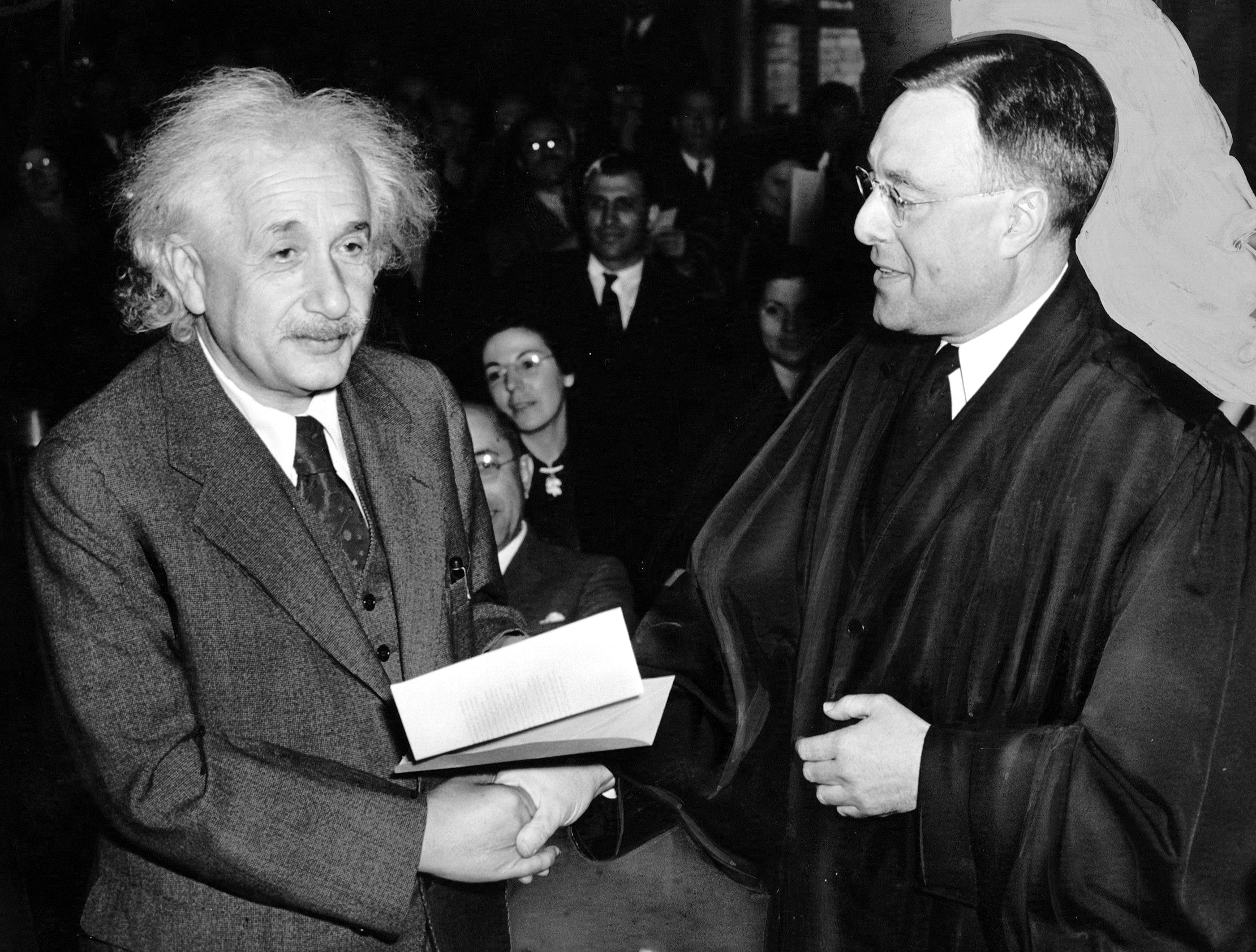
Einstein receiving his certificate of American citizenship from Judge Phillip Forman in 1940. He retained his Swiss citizenship.

Einstein moved to the United States in December 1932, where he worked at the California Institute of Technology in Pasadena, California, and lectured at Abraham Flexner's newly founded Institute for Advanced Study in Princeton, New Jersey. Einstein renounced his German citizenship in 1933 due to the rise of Adolf Hitler and the Nazi Party.

During the 1930s and into World War II, Einstein wrote affidavits recommending United States visas for European Jews who were trying to flee persecution and lobbied for looser immigration rules. He raised money for Zionist organizations and was, in part, responsible for the 1933 formation of the International Rescue Committee, a humanitarian organization which gives support and shelter to refugees from social and political persecution.

After World War II ended, and the Nazis were removed from power, Einstein refused to associate with Germany. Einstein refused several honors bestowed upon him by Germany, as he could not forgive the Germans for the Holocaust, where six million of his fellow Jews were murdered. In 1944 Einstein stated "Behind the Nazi party stands the German people, who elected Hitler after he had in his book and in his speeches made his shameful intentions clear beyond the possibility of misunderstanding". Einstein, however, re-visited Germany on a trip to Europe in 1952.

== United States ==
=== Civil rights for African Americans ===
Einstein was a proponent of civil rights and used his renown to condemn American discrimination. When he arrived in America, he objected to the mistreatment of African Americans. Einstein, who had experienced heavy anti-Semitic discrimination in pre-World War II Germany, worked with a number of leading civil rights activists and civil rights organizations (such as the Princeton chapter of the NAACP) to demand equality and denounce racism and segregation.

When African American singer and civil rights supporter Marian Anderson was denied rooms at hotels and forbidden to eat at public restaurants, Einstein invited her to his home. After a bloody racial riot in 1946, where 500 state troopers with submachine guns attacked and destroyed virtually every black-owned business in a four-square-block area in Columbia, Tennessee and arrested 25 black men for attempted murder, Einstein joined Eleanor Roosevelt, Langston Hughes, and Thurgood Marshall to fight for justice for the men. Later, 24 of the 25 defendants were acquitted.

There is, however, a somber point in the social outlook of Americans. Their sense of equality and human dignity is mainly limited to men of white skins.

— Albert Einstein
speech at Lincoln University, 1946

In 1946, he travelled to Lincoln University in Pennsylvania, the alma mater of Langston Hughes and Thurgood Marshall and the first school in America to grant college degrees to black students. At Lincoln, Einstein received an honorary degree and gave a lecture on relativity to Lincoln students.

When two black couples were murdered in Monroe, Georgia, and justice was not served, Einstein was so outraged that he lent his prominence to actor and activist Paul Robeson's American Crusade to End Lynching and wrote a letter to President Truman calling for prosecution of lynchers and passage of a federal anti-lynching law. When Robeson was blacklisted due to his activism against racism, again it was Einstein who opened his home to his long-time friend of 20 years.

In 1931, Einstein joined Theodore Dreiser's committee to protest the injustice experienced by the Scottsboro Boys, a group of African American teenagers convicted of rape by an all-white jury. In 1946, Einstein also came out in support of Willie McGee, a black Mississippi sharecropper who was sentenced to death after being accused of raping a white woman.

=== Accusations of anti-Chinese sentiment ===
Written between October 1922 and March 1923, private travel diaries of Einstein (released in 2018) contain remarks that have been called racist and xenophobic, but which also contrast greatly with the profound concern for racial justice he displayed in his later decades. In the earlier, private notes, he writes how the "Chinese don't sit on benches while eating but squat like Europeans do when they relieve themselves out in the leafy woods. All this occurs quietly and demurely. Even the children are spiritless and look obtuse." After earlier writing of the "abundance of offspring" and the "fecundity" of the Chinese, he goes on to say: "It would be a pity if these Chinese supplant all other races. For the likes of us the mere thought is unspeakably dreary." Einstein's perceptions of the Japanese he meets are more positive: "Japanese unostentatious, decent, altogether very appealing," he writes. "Pure souls as nowhere else among people. One has to love and admire this country."

=== Views on homosexuality ===
Einstein was one of the thousands of signatories of Magnus Hirschfeld's petition against Paragraph 175 of the German penal code, which condemned homosexuality. The petition ran for more than thirty years in the intellectual circles thanks to the activity of Hirschfeld's Scientific-Humanitarian Committee, which collected many signatures from Jewish members of the German intellectual elite.

=== Animal rights ===
Einstein was opposed to violence against animals, so he thought that one should "embrace all living creatures". He also sympathized with the idea of vegetarianism. The latest indications, a letter written to Hans Mühsam, dated March 30, 1954, suggest that Einstein was a vegetarian for the last year of his life, though he appears to have supported the idea for many years before practicing it himself. In this letter Einstein states that he was feeling quite well eating vegetarian food and that "man was not born to be a carnivore". He wrote in another letter a year before: "I have always eaten animal flesh with a somewhat guilty conscience".

== Zionism ==
=== Before Israeli independence ===
Einstein was a prominent supporter of both Labor Zionism and efforts to encourage Jewish–Arab cooperation. In 1938 Einstein explained "In this hour one thing, above all, must be emphasized: Judaism owes a great debt of gratitude to Zionism. The Zionist movement has revived among Jews the sense of community. It has performed productive work surpassing all the expectations any one could entertain. This productive work in Palestine, to which self-sacrificing Jews throughout the world have contributed has saved a large number of our brethren from direst need". Einstein supported the creation of a Jewish national homeland in Mandatory Palestine but was opposed to the idea of a Jewish state "with borders, an army, and a measure of temporal power." According to Marc Elis, Einstein declared himself a human being, a Jew, an opponent of nationalism, and a Zionist; he supported the idea of a Jewish homeland in Palestine but until summer 1947 conceived of this as a bi-national (Jewish and Arab) state, with "continuously functioning, mixed, administrative, economic, and social organizations."

Long before the emergence of Hitler I made the cause of Zionism mine because through it I saw a means of correcting a flagrant wrong....The Jewish people alone has for centuries been in the anomalous position of being victimized and hounded as a people, though bereft of all the rights and protections which even the smallest people normally has...Zionism offered the means of ending this discrimination. Through the return to the land to which they were bound by close historic ties...Jews sought to abolish their pariah status among peoples... The advent of Hitler underscored with a savage logic all the disastrous implications contained in the abnormal situation in which Jews found themselves. Millions of Jews perished... because there was no spot on the globe where they could find sanctuary...The Jewish survivors demand the right to dwell amid brothers, on the ancient soil of their fathers." —Letter to Jawaharlal Nehru, Prime Minister of India, June 13, 1947

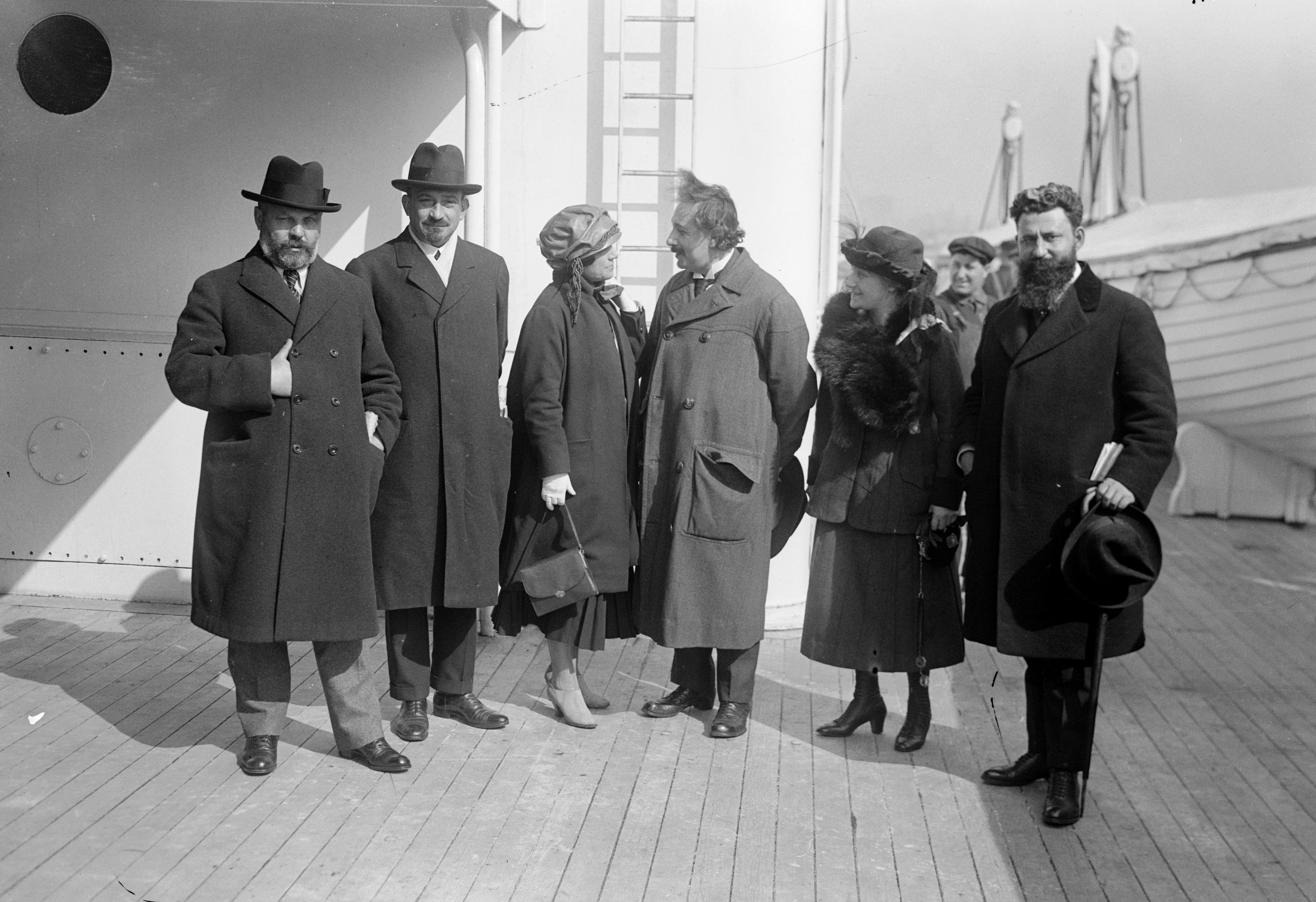
Albert Einstein, seen here with his wife Elsa Einstein and Zionist leaders, including future President of Israel Chaim Weizmann, his wife Dr. Vera Weizmann, Menahem Ussishkin, and Ben-Zion Mossinson on arrival in New York City in 1921

His speeches and lectures about Zionism were published in 1931 by The Macmillan Company and eleven of these essays were collected in a 1933 book entitled Mein Weltbild and translated into English as The World as I See It; Einstein's foreword dedicates the collection "to the Jews of Germany". In the face of Germany's rising militarism, Einstein wrote and spoke for peace.

Einstein publicly stated reservations about the proposal to partition Mandatory Palestine into independent Arab and Jewish countries. In a 1938 speech, "Our Debt to Zionism", he said:

I should much rather see reasonable agreement with the Arabs on the basis of living together in peace than the creation of a Jewish state. My awareness of the essential nature of Judaism resists the idea of a Jewish state with borders, an army, and a measure of temporal power, no matter how modest. I am afraid of the inner damage Judaism will sustain—especially from the development of a narrow nationalism within our own ranks, against which we have already had to fight strongly, even without a Jewish state. ... If external necessity should after all compel us to assume this burden, let us bear it with tact and patience.

His attitudes were nuanced: In his testimony before the Anglo-American Committee of Inquiry in January 1946, Einstein stated that he was not in favor of the creation of a Jewish state, while in a 1947 letter to Indian Prime Minister Jawaharlal Nehru intended to persuade India to support Zionist aims of establishing a Jewish homeland in Palestine, Einstein stated that the Balfour Declaration's proposal to establish a national home for Jews in Palestine "redresses the balance" of justice and history, claiming that "at the end of the first world war, the Allies gave the Arabs 99% of the vast, underpopulated territories liberated from the Turks to satisfy their national aspirations and five independent Arab states were established. One percent was reserved for the Jews in the land of their origin". Einstein remained strongly supportive of unlimited Jewish immigration to Palestine.

=== After Israeli independence ===
The United Nations ultimately recommended division of the mandate and the establishment of a Jewish State, and the 1948 Arab-Israeli war broke out as the mandate ended.

On the spring of 1948, during the war, Einstein was asked to write a letter that would be auctioned in an event to raise money for the Zionist paramilitary organization. Einstein wrote a letter that was sold in the event, in which he said: "If we wait until the Great Powers and the United Nations fulfill their commitments to us then our Palestinian brothers will be under the ground before this is accomplished" and "On the destiny of our Palestinians will depend, in the long run, the destiny of the remaining Jews in the world. For no one respects or bothers about those who do not fight for their rights".

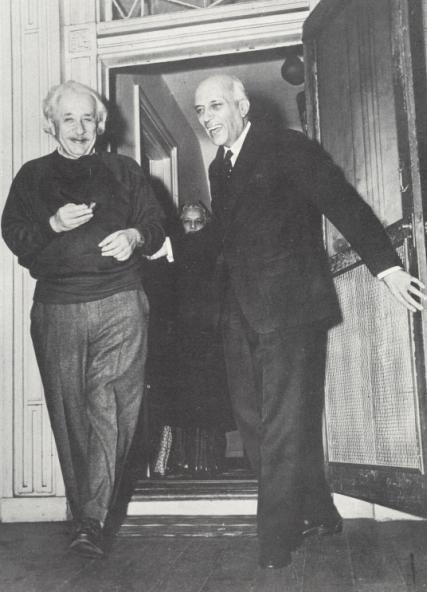
Albert Einstein with Jawaharlal Nehru at Princeton, New Jersey

Einstein was one of the authors of an open letter to the New York Times in 1948 which deeply criticized Menachem Begin's Herut (Freedom) Party for the Deir Yassin massacre attributed to "terrorist bands", and likened Herut to "the Nazi and Fascist parties". He further stated "The Deir Yassin incident exemplifies the character and actions of the Freedom Party". Einstein said of the party that "Today they speak of freedom, democracy and anti-imperialism...It is in its actions that the terrorist party betrays its real character", while also criticizing Irgun by calling it a "terrorist, right-wing, chauvinist organization".

In 1949 Einstein wrote in a letter to The Hebrew University of Jerusalem that this period is "the fulfillment of our dreams", but that he regrets that "we were compelled by the adversities of our situation to assert our rights through force of arms; it was the only way to avert complete annihilation". He also expressed the hope that "the wisdom and moderation the leaders of the new state have shown" will gradually lead to "cooperation and mutual respect" with the Arab people.

Einstein supported vice president Henry Wallace's Progressive Party during the 1948 Presidential election which advocated a pro-Soviet and pro-Israel foreign policy.

Einstein served on the Board of Governors of The Hebrew University of Jerusalem. In his Will of 1950, Einstein bequeathed literary rights to his writings to The Hebrew University, where many of his original documents are held in the Albert Einstein Archives.

When Israeli President Chaim Weizmann died in 1952, Einstein was asked to be Israel's second president, but he declined, stating that he had "neither the natural ability nor the experience to deal with human beings." He wrote: "I am deeply moved by the offer from our State of Israel, and at once saddened and ashamed that I cannot accept it."

He took the draft of a speech he was preparing for a television appearance commemorating the state of Israel's seventh anniversary with him to the hospital, but he did not live to complete it. In the draft he speaks about the dangers facing Israel and says “It is anomalous that world opinion should only criticize Israel’s response to hostility and should not actively seek to bring an end to the Arab hostility which is the root cause of the tension.”

== Cold War ==
When he was a visible figure working against the rise of Nazism, Einstein had sought help and developed working relationships in both the West and what was to become the Soviet bloc. After World War II, enmity between the former allies became a very serious issue for people with international résumés. To make things worse, during the first days of McCarthyism, Einstein was writing about a single world government believing "There can never be complete agreement on international control and the administration of atomic energy or on general disarmament until there is a modification of the traditional concept of national sovereignty."

Einstein appealed for clemency for Julius and Ethel Rosenberg, who were ultimately executed for spying for the USSR.

=== Accusations of pro-Soviet politics ===
J. Edgar Hoover, the first director of the Federal Bureau of Investigation, promoted a letter from the Woman Patriot Corporation accusing Einstein of left-wing radicalism and imploring the government to bar him from entry to the United States. Hoover accused Einstein of being pro-Soviet. However, Einstein denounced Soviet Russia and in a letter said, "there seems to be complete suppression of the individual and of freedom of speech".

In a 1949 Monthly Review article entitled "Why Socialism?" Albert Einstein described a chaotic capitalist society, a source of evil to be overcome, as the "predatory phase of human development". With Albert Schweitzer and Bertrand Russell, Einstein lobbied to stop nuclear testing and future bombs. Days before his death, Einstein signed the Russell-Einstein Manifesto, which led to the Pugwash Conferences on Science and World Affairs.

When the aged W. E. B. Du Bois was accused by the U.S. Justice Department of acting as an agent of a foreign state, Einstein volunteered as a character witness, and the case was dismissed shortly afterward. Einstein's friendship with activist Paul Robeson, with whom he served as co-chair of the American Crusade to End Lynching, lasted twenty years. In 1953, in a letter to Rose Russell, a member of the Teachers Union of the City of New York, Einstein described the McCarthy hearings as "using people as tools for the prosecution of others that one wants to label as 'unorthodox.'" Einstein considered Senator Joseph McCarthy to be a danger to intellectual and academic freedom.

In 1953, William Frauenglass, a New York City school teacher who, having been called to testify, refused, and facing dismissal from his position, wrote to Einstein for support. In his reply, Einstein stated: "The reactionary politicians have managed to instill suspicion of all intellectual efforts into the public by dangling before their eyes a danger from without. Having succeeded so far they are now proceeding to suppress the freedom of teaching and to deprive of their positions all those who do not prove submissive, i.e. to starve them." Einstein advised: "Every intellectual who is called before one of the committees ought to refuse to testify, i.e. he must be prepared for jail and economic ruin, in short, for the sacrifice of his personal welfare in the interest of the cultural welfare of his country." Einstein concluded, "If enough people are ready to take this grave step they will be successful. If not, then the intellectuals of this country deserve nothing better than the slavery which is intended for them."

In 1946, Einstein collaborated with Rabbi Israel Goldstein, Middlesex University heir C. Ruggles Smith, and activist attorney George Alpert on the Albert Einstein Foundation for Higher Learning, which was formed to create a Jewish-sponsored secular university, open to all students, on the grounds of the former Middlesex University in Waltham, Massachusetts. Middlesex was chosen in part because it was accessible from both Boston and New York City, Jewish cultural centers of the U.S. Their vision was a university "deeply conscious both of the Hebraic tradition of Torah looking upon culture as a birthright, and of the American ideal of an educated democracy." The collaboration was stormy, however. When Einstein wanted to appoint English economist Harold Laski as the university's president, George Alpert wrote that Laski was "a man utterly alien to American principles of democracy, tarred with the Communist brush." Einstein withdrew his support of the university and barred the use of his name, opening in 1948 as Brandeis University instead. In 1953, Brandeis offered Einstein an honorary degree, which he declined.

== Socialism ==
In 1918, Einstein was one of the founding members of the German Democratic Party, a liberal party. However, later in his life, Einstein was in favor of socialism and in opposition to capitalism. In his 1949 essay "Why Socialism?", he wrote:

I am convinced there is only one way to eliminate these grave evils, namely through the establishment of a socialist economy, accompanied by an educational system which would be oriented toward social goals. In such an economy, the means of production are owned by society itself and are utilized in a planned fashion. A planned economy, which adjusts production to the needs of the community, would distribute the work to be done among all those able to work and would guarantee a livelihood to every man, woman, and child. The education of the individual, in addition to promoting his own innate abilities, would attempt to develop in him a sense of responsibility for his fellow-men in place of the glorification of power and success in our present society.

Einstein's opinions on the Bolsheviks changed with time. In 1925, he criticized them for not having a 'well-regulated system of government' and called their rule a 'regime of terror and a tragedy in human history'. He later adopted a more balanced view, criticizing their methods but praising their goals, demonstrated by his 1929 remark on Vladimir Lenin: "I honor Lenin as a man who completely sacrificed himself and devoted all his energy to the realization of social justice. I do not consider his methods practical, but one thing is certain: men of his type are the guardians and restorers of the conscience of humanity." Rowe translates the beginning of the second sentence as "I do not find his methods advisable".

In 1949 Einstein stated "The achievement of socialism requires the solution of some extremely difficult socio-political problems: how is it possible, in view of the far-reaching centralization of political and economic power, to prevent bureaucracy from becoming all-powerful and overweening? How can the rights of the individual be protected and therewith a democratic counterweight to the power of bureaucracy be assured?".

Einstein held Georgism (named after the political economist Henry George) in high regard, writing in 1934: "One cannot imagine a more beautiful combination of intellectual keenness, artistic form and fervent love of justice."

Given Einstein's links to Germany and Zionism, his socialist ideals, and his links to Communist figures, the U.S. Federal Bureau of Investigation kept a file on Einstein that grew to 1,427 pages.

== Internationalism ==
From the 1930s and until his death in the 1950s, a primary focus of Einstein's political work was promoting international cooperation. He promoted the creation of a new world organization to replace the League of Nations, and advocated reforming the United Nations once it had been created. He was in favor of world federalism.

He wrote hundreds of letters, speeches, gave interviews and directly advocated the issue of internationalism in various forms. In a letter to the United Nations General Assembly he wrote:

[T]he method of representation at the United Nations should be considerably modified. The present method of selection by government appointment does not leave any real freedom to the appointee. Furthermore, selection by governments cannot give the peoples of the world the feeling of being fairly and proportionately represented. The moral authority of the United Nations would be considerably enhanced if the delegates were elected directly by the people. Were they responsible to an electorate, they would have much more freedom to follow their consciences. Thus we could hope for more statesmen and fewer diplomats.

In 1951, Einstein wrote that the United Nations was "merely an organization of delegates from national governments and not of independent individuals who, guided solely by their personal convictions, represent the populations of the various countries. Moreover, decisions in the United Nations have no binding force on any national government; nor do any concrete means exist by which these decisions can actually be enforced." Einstein in 1947 wrote that "with all my heart I believe that the world present system" will lead only "to barbarism, war and inhumanity and that only world law can assure progress toward a civilized peaceful humanity".

=== World government ===
Einstein grew increasingly convinced that the world was veering off course. He arrived at the conclusion that the gravity of the situation demanded more profound actions and the establishment of a "world government" was the only logical solution. In his "Open Letter to the General Assembly of the United Nations" of October 1947, Einstein emphasized the urgent need for international cooperation and the establishment of a world government. In the year 1948, Einstein invited United World Federalists, Inc.(UWF) president Cord Meyer to a meeting of ECAS and joined UWF as a member of the Advisory Board. Einstein and ECAS assisted UEF in fundraising and provided supporting material. Einstein described United World Federalists as: "the group nearest to our aspirations". Einstein and other prominent figures sponsored the Peoples' World Convention (PWC), which took place in 1950-51 and later continued in the form of world constituent assemblies in 1968, 1977, 1978–79, and 1991. This effort was successful in creating a world constitution, Constitution for the Federation of Earth, and a Provisional World Government consisting of a Provisional World Parliament.

== Pacifism ==
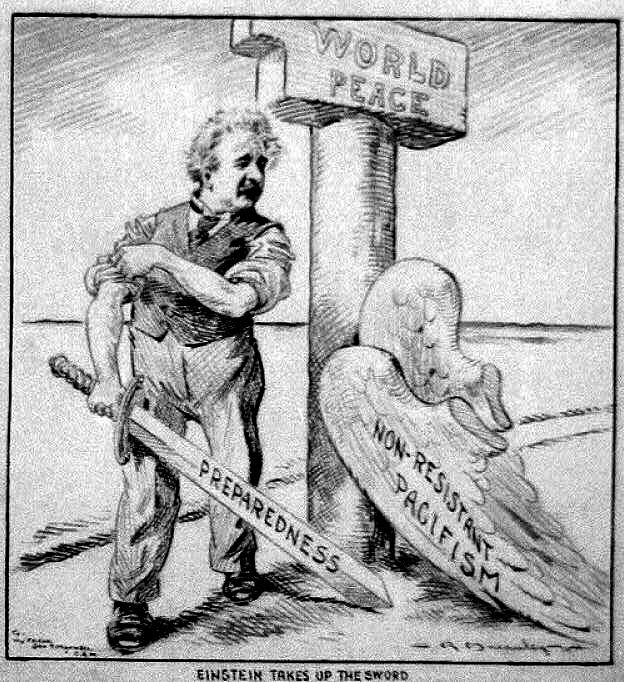
Cartoon of Einstein, depicting him shedding his "Pacifism" wings and raising a sword labeled "Preparedness" in response to an increasingly hostile Germany (c. 1933)

=== World War I ===
Einstein was a lifelong pacifist and believed that wars stood in the way of human progress. He believed that wars were the result of natural aggressive tendencies found within all organisms and that the aims and causes of war were simply justification for these tendencies. He advocated the creation of a supranational organization would make war as impossible in Europe as it was impossible between the former kingdoms that comprised the German Empire. Einstein was horrified by the destruction caused by World War I and promoted what he referred to as the "two percent plan". According to the plan, nations would be unable to wage war if one in 50 men refused to serve in the military.

In a 1918 letter to Max Born, he wrote: “the population of Europe has grown from 113 million to almost 400 million during the last century… a terrible thought, which could almost make one reconciled to war!”.

=== World War II ===
Despite these views, following the rise to power of Adolf Hitler, Einstein became a vocal advocate for preparedness, recognizing the dangers of Nazi Germany gaining an advantage over the Western Allies. Alarmed at Hitler's territorial ambitions, Einstein actively encouraged Belgians to join the military to protect European civilization. He explained the change in his outlook in 1941:

In the twenties, when no dictatorships existed, I advocated that refusing to go to war would make war improper. But as soon as coercive conditions appeared in certain nations, I felt that it would weaken the less aggressive nations vis-à-vis the more aggressive ones.

Einstein justified his letter to President Roosevelt recommending that an atomic bomb be produced by writing:

...it seemed probable that the Germans might be working on the same problem with every prospect of success. I had no alternative but to act as I did, although I have always been a convinced pacifist. (emphasis in original)

When questioned about this position, Einstein wrote:

I did not say that I was an absolute pacifist, but rather that I have always been a convinced pacifist. While I am a convinced pacifist, there are circumstances in which I believe the use of force is appropriate – namely, in the face of an enemy unconditionally bent on destroying me and my people. ... I am a dedicated but not an absolute pacifist; this means that I am opposed to the use of force under any circumstances except when confronted by an enemy who pursues the destruction of life as an end in itself. (emphasis in original)

He further explained:

I have always been a pacifist, i.e. I have declined to recognize brute force as a means for the solution of international conflicts. Nevertheless, it is, in my opinion, not reasonable to cling to that principle unconditionally. An exception has necessarily to be made if a hostile power threatens wholesale destruction of one's own group.

In September 1942, in a private letter to Princeton University president, Einstein criticized the U.S. for not doing enough to fight Nazi Germany. He argued that "If Hitler were not a lunatic he could easily have avoided the hostility of the Western powers" if not for his threats of world domination.

Following the conclusion of World War II, Einstein once again became a constant and vocal activist for world peace.

==== Atomic bomb ====
Concerned scientists, many of them refugees in the U.S. from German anti-Semitism, recognized the danger of German scientists' developing an atomic bomb based on the newly discovered phenomena of nuclear fission. In 1939, the Hungarian émigré Leó Szilárd, having failed to arouse U.S. government interest on his own, worked with Einstein to write a letter to U.S. President Franklin Delano Roosevelt, which Einstein signed, urging coordination of U.S. research into fission. On 11 October 1939 Alexander Sachs, an adviser to Roosevelt on economic affairs, delivered the Einstein–Szilárd letter and persuaded the president of its importance. "This requires action", Roosevelt told an aide, and authorized a small research program into the feasibility of nuclear weapons.

This work was originally quite modest, and Einstein himself was deliberately excluded from it. In 1941, the work accelerated, after the favorable conclusions of a report from the British MAUD Committee reached the United States. This would lead, in 1942, to the creation of the Manhattan Project, a massive scientific-industrial-military effort to develop atomic bombs for use in war. By late 1945, the U.S., with support from the United Kingdom and Canada, had developed operational nuclear weapons, and used them on the Japanese cities of Hiroshima and Nagasaki.

Einstein himself did not play a role in the development of the atomic bomb other than signing the letter, although he did help the United States Navy with some unrelated theoretical questions it was working on during the war.

According to Linus Pauling, Einstein later expressed regret about his letter to Roosevelt, adding that Einstein had originally justified his decision because of the greater danger that Nazi Germany would develop the bomb first. In 1947, Einstein told Newsweek magazine that "had I known that the Germans would not succeed in developing an atomic bomb, I would have done nothing." In that same year, he wrote an article for The Atlantic Monthly arguing that the United States should not try to pursue an atomic monopoly, and instead should equip the United Nations with nuclear weapons for the sole purpose of maintaining deterrence. Einstein also said during this period "Since I do not foresee that atomic energy is to be a great boon for a long time, I have to say that for the present it is a menace. Perhaps it is well that it should be. It may intimidate the human race to bring order into its international affairs, which without the pressure of fear, it undoubtedly would not do".

Einstein is often attributed to variations of the following quote: "I do not know how the Third World War will be fought, but I can tell you what they will use in the Fourth — sticks and stones". There is no record of Einstein uttering the quote apart from anecdotes from peers.

== Humanitarianism ==
Einstein participated in the 1927 congress of the League Against Imperialism in Brussels. Einstein also met with many humanists and humanitarians, including Rabindranath Tagore with whom he had extensive conversations in 1930 prior to leaving Germany.

== See also ==
- Religious and philosophical views of Albert Einstein
- Scientific socialism
