= James Madison High School (Brooklyn) =

Public school in New York City

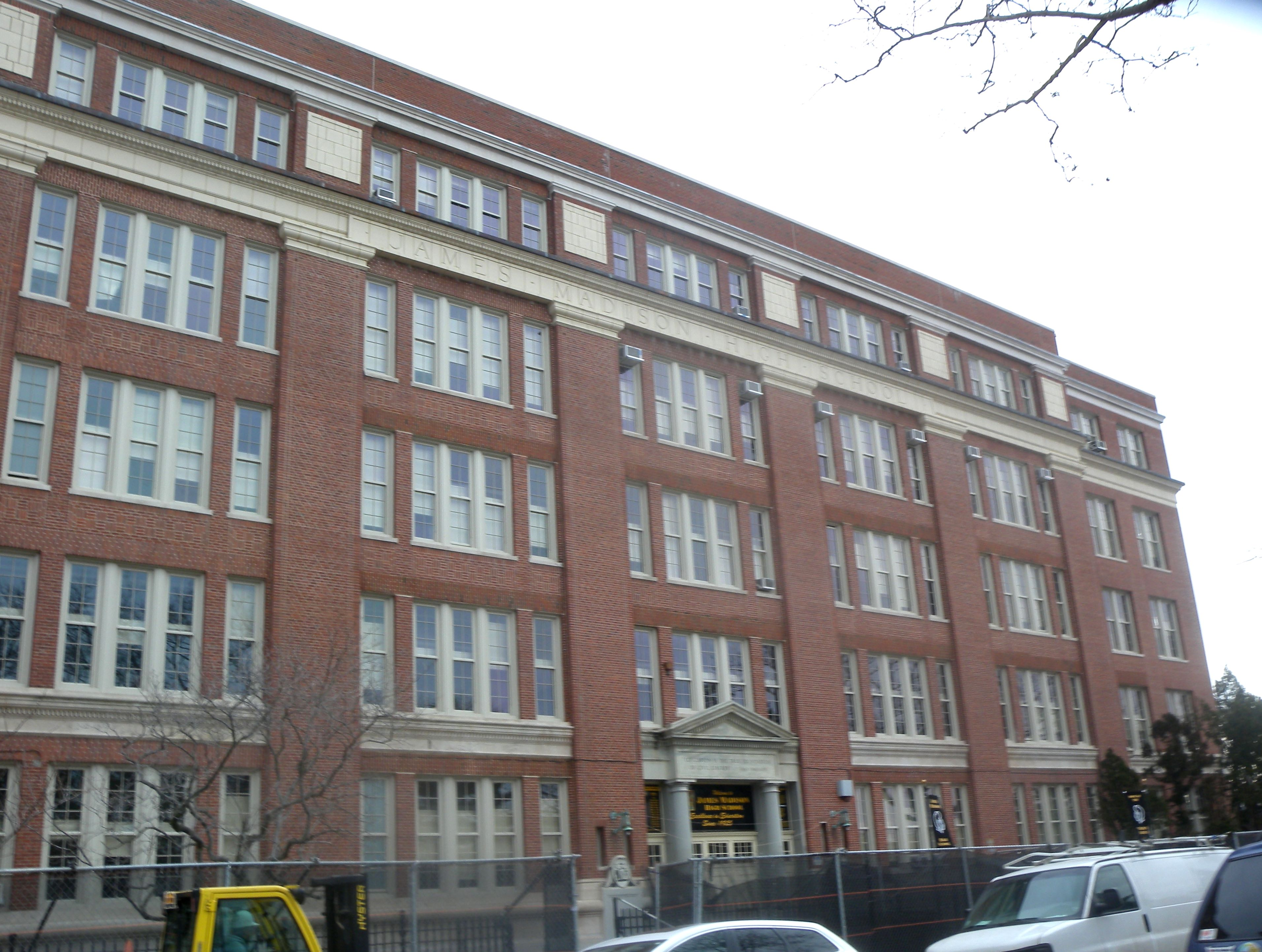

Location
- 3787 Bedford Ave; Brooklyn, New York 11229; United States; 40°36′37″N 73°56′51″W

Information
- Type: Public
- Established: 1925; 101 years ago
- School district: New York City Department of Education
- NCES School ID: 360015302009
- Principal: Jodie Cohen
- Teaching staff: 211.60 (on an FTE basis)
- Grades: 9-12
- Enrollment: 3,630 (2022-2023)
- Student to teacher ratio: 17.16
- Campus: City: Large
- Colors: Black and Gold
- Mascot: Knights
- Newspaper: Madison Highway
- Yearbook: Log
- Website: www.madisonhs.org

James Madison High School is a public high school in Midwood, Brooklyn. It serves students in grades 9 through 12 and is in Region 6 of the New York City Department of Education.

Established in 1925, the school has many famous graduates, among them the late United States Supreme Court Associate Justice Ruth Bader Ginsburg, Judge Judy Sheindlin, two sitting U.S. senators, Bernie Sanders (I-VT) and Chuck Schumer (D-NY) and former Senator Norm Coleman (R-MN). The school counts five Nobel Prize winners among its alumni.

== Academics ==
At Madison, students are a part of one of eight houses the school has to offer. They act as academic communities in the school that focus on a specific field or career.

- Health Sciences (Medical House)
- Academy Of Finance
- International House
- Law Institute
- LAM House (Literature, Arts, and Music)
- Academy of Information Technology (IT)
- Pre-Education House
- Exploration House

=== Screened programs ===
Out of the eight Madison houses, both the Law Institute and Health Sciences house are screened programs and are considered by students as "honors" houses that students have to get in with good grades during the NYC high school application process or can transfer in from another house while at Madison.

The Law Institute (known as the Law House by students and faculty) is a special program centered around understanding the legal system, constitution, and the United States' Government. Students in the Law Institute participate in Mock Trial, Moot Court, and We The People. The school also features a mock court room for Law Institute students named after Madison alum and a former US Supreme Court justice, Ruth Bader Ginsburg.

The Health Science House (known as the Medical or "Med" House) is a special program that focuses in medical and health sciences. As a senior, students in the Health Sciences House are able to become certified as a EMT or a medical assistant. There are multiple different tracks of study students here can choose.

=== Advanced Placement classes ===
Madison has a large amount of Advanced Placement classes by the College Board for students to take to receive college credit.

- AP English Language and Composition
- AP English Literature and Composition
- AP World History: Modern
- AP US History
- AP European History
- AP Capstone
- AP US Government and Politics
- AP Macroeconomics
- AP Art History
- AP Human Geography
- AP Biology
- AP Psychology
- AP Environmental Science
- AP Chemistry
- AP Physics 1
- AP Calculus AB
- AP Calculus BC
- AP Computer Science A
- AP Computer Science Principles
- AP Spanish Language and Culture
- AP Spanish Literature and Culture
- AP Chinese Language and Culture

== Extracurricular activities ==
=== Sports ===
Madison has many PSAL sports teams in boys and girls junior varsity and varsity. They have teams in football, soccer, baseball, swimming, basketball, volleyball, track, cross country, badminton, bowling, lacrosse, wrestling, golf, handball, table tennis, and rugby. The school team's name is the "Knights."

== Notable teachers ==
- William Frauenglass
- Clarence Taylor

== Notable alumni ==
Notable alumni of James Madison High School include:

- Cal Abrams (1924–1997, class of 1942), Major-League Baseball player.
- Elaine Abrams, physician, professor and public health expert.
- Maury Allen (born Maurice Allen Rosenberg; 1932–2010, class of 1949), sportswriter.
- Roger Andewelt (1946–2001, class of 1963), attorney, federal judge US Court of Federal Claims
- Arthur Ashkin (1922–2020, class of 1940), Nobel Prize winner, physics.
- Julius Ashkin (1920–1982, class of 1936), Manhattan Project physicist.
- Gary Becker (1930–2014, class of 1948), Nobel Prize winner, economics.
- Paul Bender (born 1933), attorney, author, judge, law professor, and former Dean of the Arizona State University College of Law.
- Jay Bennett (1912–2009), author
- Mimi Benzell (1918–1970), opera singer.
- Walter Block (born 1941, class of 1959), Austrian School economist, anarcho-capitalist theoretician, professor of economics
- Harry Boatswain (1969–2005, class of 1987), former professional NFL football player.
- Andrew Dice Clay (born 1957 as Andrew Clay Silverstein), comedian.
- Stanley Cohen (1922–2020, class of 1939), Nobel Prize winner, medicine.
- Norm Coleman (born 1949, class of 1966), former US Senator (Republican of Minnesota).
- Paul Contillo (1929–2024), New Jersey State Senator
- Robert Dallek (born 1934, class of 1952), historian.
- Roy DeMeo (1940–1983, class of 1959), mobster.
- Harry Eisenstat (1915–2003, class of 1935), Major League Baseball player
- Devale Ellis (born 1984), professional football player and actor.
- Vivian Perlstein Folkenflik (1940–2023), educator and translator
- Harvey Feldman (1931–2009, class of 1949), US diplomat: known for planning the 1972 Nixon trip to China, US Ambassador to Papua New Guinea and the Solomon Islands, Alternative US Representative to the United Nations
- Sandra Feldman (1939–2005, class of 1956), President of the American Federation of Teachers.
- Stan Fields (born 1955, class of 1973), biologist: discovered the two-hybrid system
- Norman Finkelstein (born 1953) political scientist, activist, professor, author.
- Sonny Fox (1925–2021), TV personality.
- Kevin Francis, (born 1993, class of 2011) CFL player
- Fran Fraschilla (born 1958, class of 1976), basketball commentator and former college basketball coach
- Leonard Frey (1938–1988, class of 1956), actor.
- Joseph S. Fruton (1912–2007), born Joseph Fruchtgarten, Jewish Polish-American biochemist and historian of science.
- David Frye (1933–2011; born David Shapiro), comedian.
- Sid Ganis (born 1940, class of 1957), motion picture executive.
- William Gaines (1922–1992, class of 1939), founding publisher of Mad magazine.
- Ruth Bader Ginsburg (1933–2020, class of 1950), Associate Justice, US Supreme Court.
- Richard D. Gitlin (born 1943, class of 1959), National Academy of Engineering, co-inventor of DSL while at Bell Labs
- Lila R. Gleitman (1929–2021), 2017 Rumelhart prize recipient
- Marty Glickman (1917-2001, class of 1935), Olympian and broadcaster.
- Jonathan Greenstein (born 1967), antique Judaica authentication expert
- Ron Haigler (born 1953, class of 1971), basketball player.
- Stanley Myron Handleman (1929–2007, class of 1947), comedian.
- Deborah Hay (born 1941, class of 1957), dancer, artist
- Ellis Horowitz (born 1944, class of 1960), computer scientist, professor
- Garson Kanin (1912–1999, class of 1927), writer and director of plays and films.
- Stanley Kaplan (1919–2009, class of 1935), test preparation entrepreneur.
- Buddy Kaye (1918–2002), songwriter, musician, producer, author and publisher.
- Donald Keene (1922–2019, class of 1939), Japanese scholar, historian, writer, and translator.
- Carole King (born 1942 as Carole Klein, class of 1958), singer and songwriter.
- Paul L. Krinsky (1928–2023, class of 1946), U.S. Navy rear admiral.
- Martin Landau (1928-2017), Academy Award-winning actor.
- Rudy LaRusso (1937–2004), five-time All-Star NBA basketball player.
- Mell Lazarus (1927–2016), cartoonist.
- Andrew Levane (1920–2012, class of 1940), professional NBA basketball player.
- David Lichtenstein (born 1960), billionaire real estate investor
- Elaine Malbin (born 1932, class of 1948), opera singer.
- Marvin Miller (1917–2012, class of 1933), MLB players union executive director.
- Bruce Morrow (born 1935, class of 1953), radio personality.
- Herbert S. Okun (1930–2011, class of 1947), diplomat.
- Martin Lewis Perl (1927–2014, class of 1942), Nobel Prize winner, physics.
- Sylvia Porter (1913–1991, class of 1930), economist and journalist.
- Deborah Poritz (born 1936, class of 1954), N.J. Attorney General then Chief Justice, N.J. Supreme Court.
- Shais Rishon (born 1982, class of 1999), rabbi, activist, and writer.
- Chris Rock (born 1965), comedian and actor.
- Norman Rosten (1913–1995), poet, playwright and novelist.
- Abdel Russell (born 1977), Independent record label owner (MVB Records), showrunner (MVBtv), author, creator of the term Urban pop culture, and retail executive.
- Dmitry Salita (born 1982), professional boxer.
- Murray Saltzman (1929–2010, class of 1947), Reform Jewish rabbi.
- Bernie Sanders (born 1941, class of 1959), US Senator, (Independent of Vermont) as well as a 2016 and 2020 U.S. presidential candidate.
- Larry Sanders (born 1935), American-British politician and brother of Bernie Sanders.
- Babe Scheuer (1913–1997), American football player
- Harvey Schlesinger (born 1940, class of 1958), US District Judge for the Middle District of Florida
- Ted Schreiber (1938–2022), Major League Baseball player.
- Chuck Schumer (born 1950, class of 1967), U.S. Senate Majority Leader (New York)
- Sybil Shainwald (1928–2025), attorney specializing in women's health law, and activist for women's health reform
- Irwin Shaw (born Irwin Gilbert Shamforoff; 1913–1984, class of 1929), playwright, screenwriter and novelist.
- Judith Sheindlin (born 1942, class of 1960), television personality (Judge Judy).
- Janis Siegel (born 1952, class of 1969), vocalist for Manhattan Transfer and winner of ten Grammys.
- Barry Simon (born 1946, class of 1962), IBM Professor of Mathematics and Theoretical Physics at Caltech.
- Robert Solow (1924–2023, class of 1940), Nobel Prize winner, economics.
- Irving Terjesen (1915–1990, class of 1934), All-American college basketball player for NYU and early professional.
- Frank Torre (1931–2014, class of 1950), professional baseball player.
- Sidney Verba (1932–2019), political scientist.
- Stephen Verona (1940–2019) filmmaker.
- David Wohl (born 1954, class of 1971), television and film character actor.
- Larry Zicklin (born 1936), Neuberger & Berman Chairman of the Board
- Joel Zwick (born 1942, class of 1958), film, television and theater director.
