= William Frauenglass =

American high school teacher fired during McCarthyism

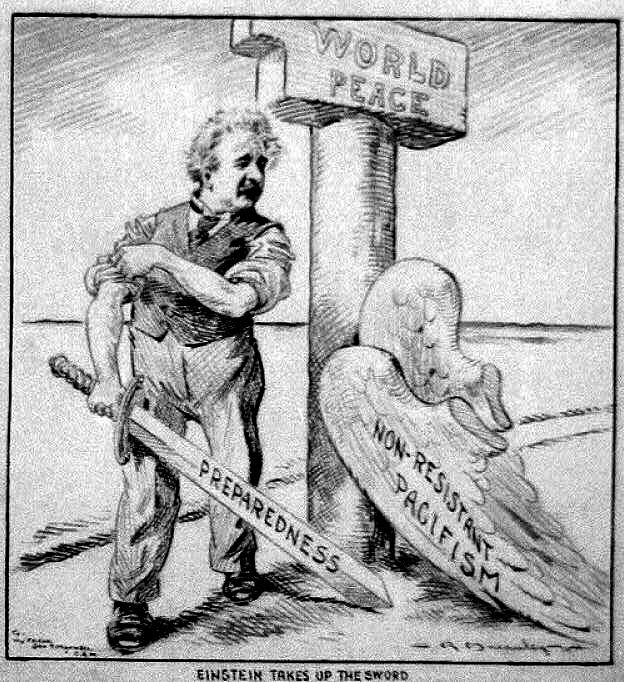
Frauenglass received support of Albert Einstein (here, shed of "Pacifism" wings, standing near pillar of "World Peace," rolling up sleeves and holding sword of "Preparedness" by Charles R. Macauley, circa 1933)

William Frauenglass was a high-school teacher to whom Albert Einstein wrote a letter on academic freedom, published in the New York Times and much publicized at the time.

== Background ==
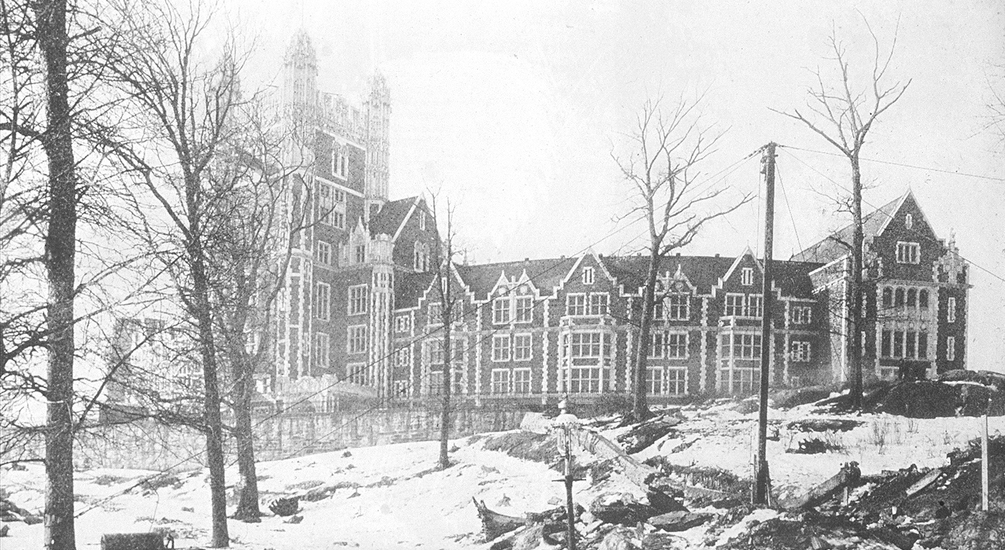
Shepard Hall at City College of New York circa 1907, where Frauenglass studied

In 1928, Frauenglass obtained a BA in social science from the City College of New York. In 1952, he obtained a degree from New York University.

== Career ==
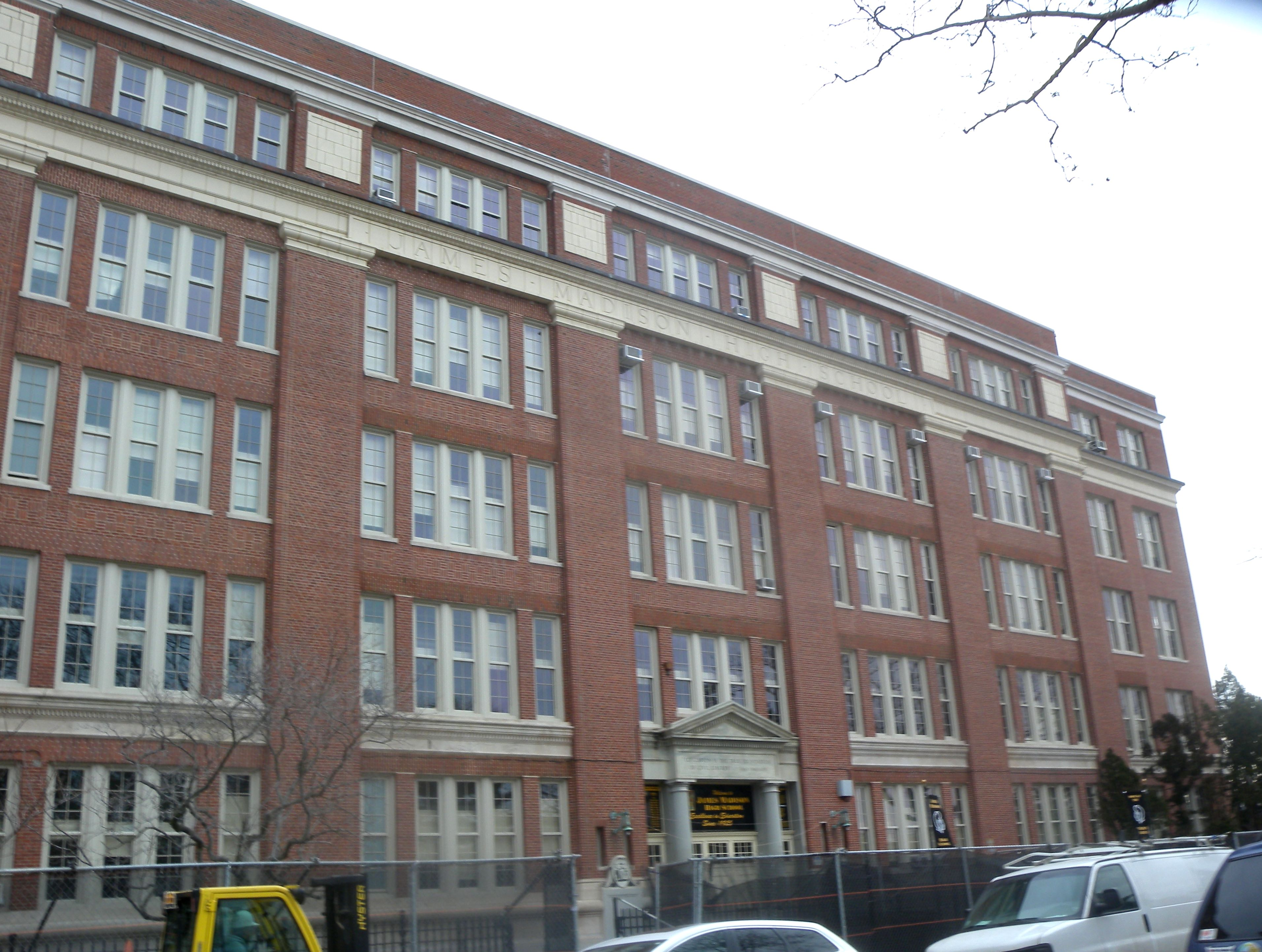
James Madison High School (Brooklyn), where Frauenglass taught English

Frauenglass became an English teacher at the James Madison High School in Brooklyn, New York. He was a member of the Teachers' Union Local 5 of the American Federation of Teachers, of which he was proud.

=== 1953 testimony ===
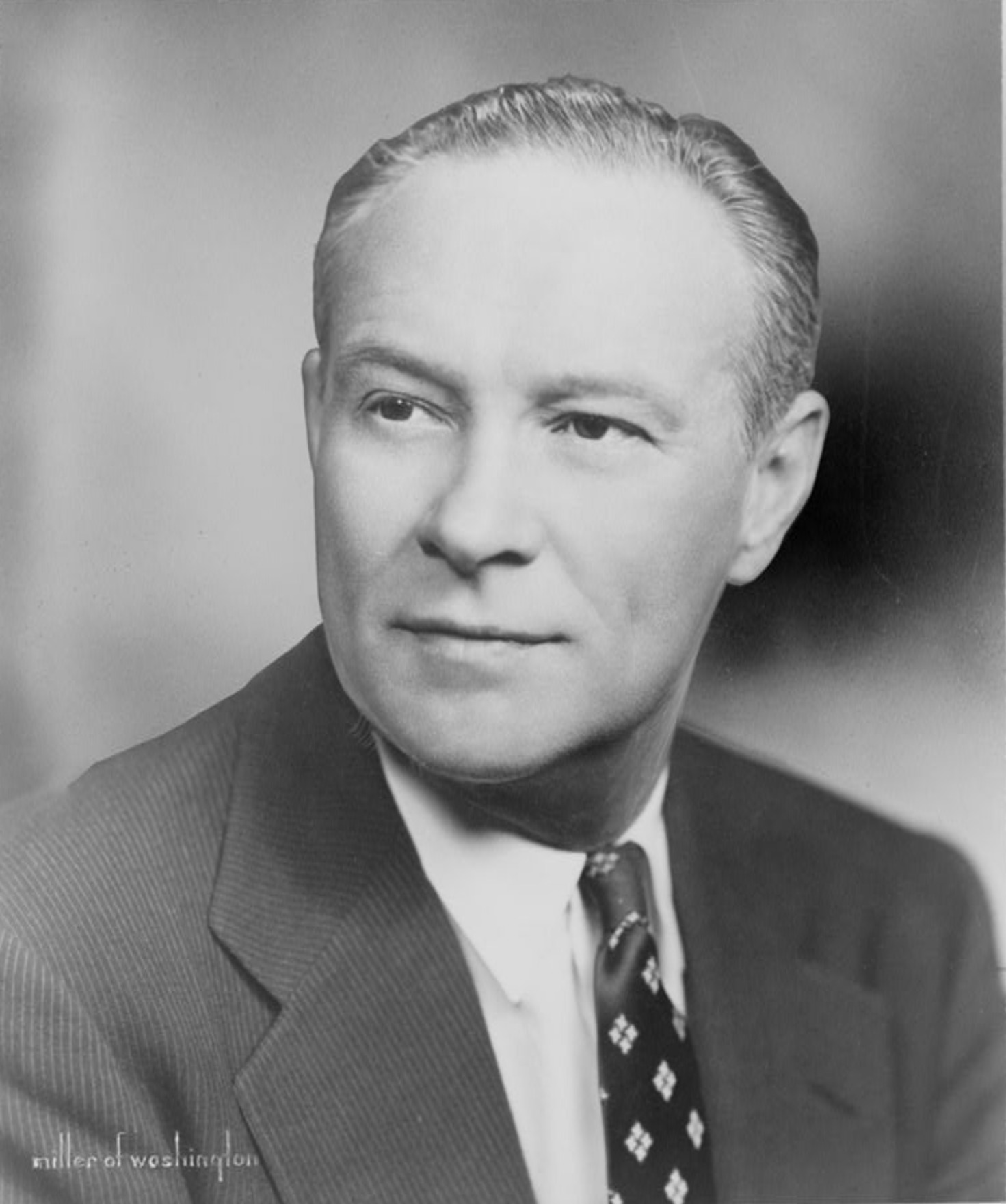
William E. Jenner headed the SISS when Frauenglass appeared before it in April 1953

On April 24, 1953, attorney Joseph Forer (member of the Washington, DC, chapter of the National Lawyers Guild) represented Frauenglass when he appeared under subpoena before the United States Senate Subcommittee on Internal Security. The subcommittee's interest lay in Frauenglass's participation in a class led by one Louis Relin in April 1947.

Frauenglass described for them:

Well, I was invited to speak, I was invited to give a lecture in the field of English literature. I have been active in the English Teachers Committee on Intercultural Education and also in my school, trying to carry into effect the program which the board of education was then interested in. the Springfield plan of introducing intercultural education into the school.
In my school when the first alertness course was given by the board of education in that field and the principal asked for somebody to volunteer to take part, I volunteered for the very first course, I think, given under the auspices of Mrs. Dubois at Textile High School, and I became intensely interested in the subject and volunteered and was commended by the chairman of my department for introducing cultural activity into that field

Frauenglass pled the Fifth whenever asked about affiliations with the Communist Party USA.

=== Einstein letter ===
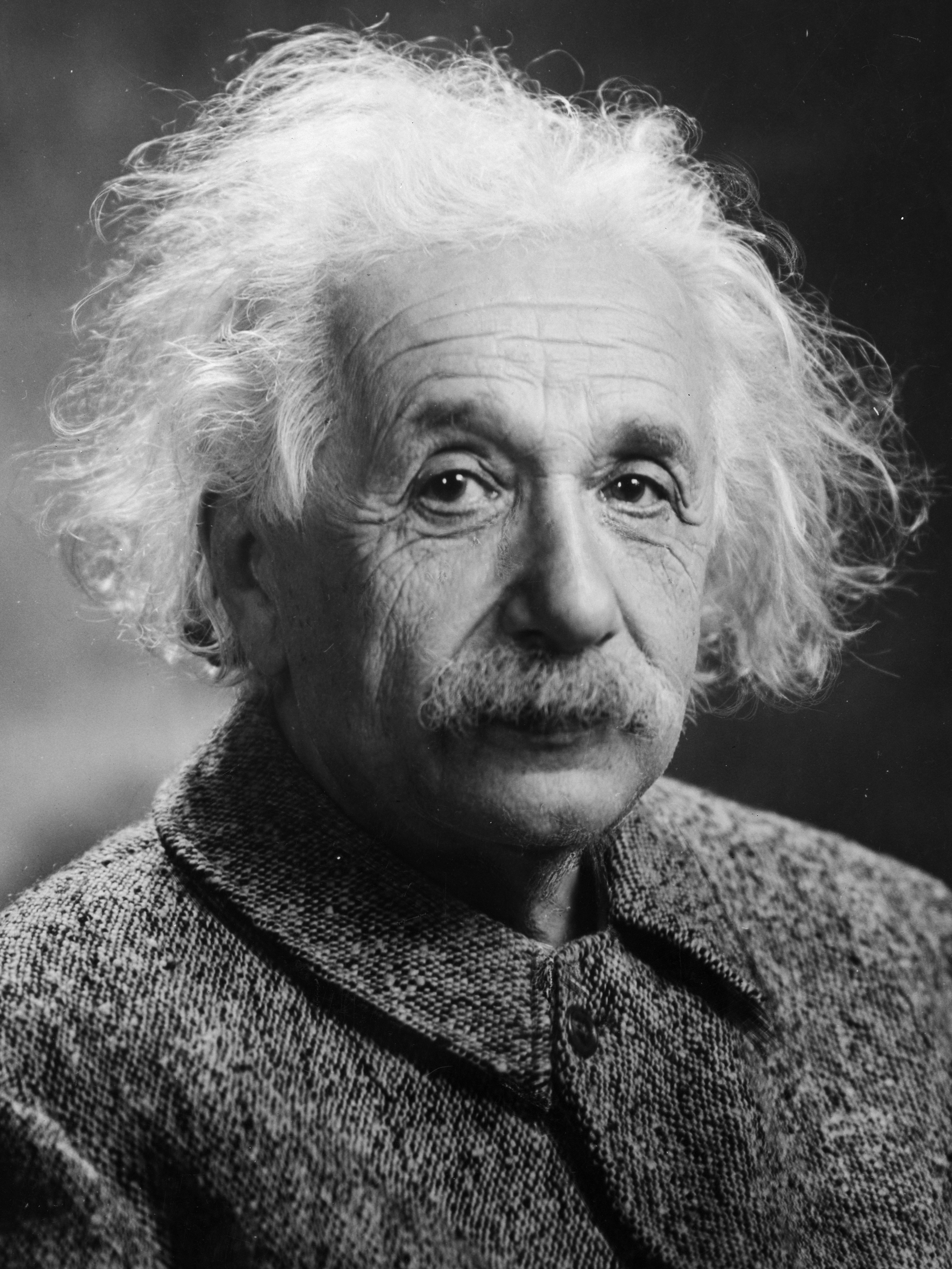
Albert Einstein (1947)

On May 16, 1953, scientist Albert Einstein wrote Frauenglass a letter, which the New York Times published on June 12, 1953. (Einstein had added a postscript stating the letter "need not remain confidential"). In the letter, Einstein had advised (reported the Times) that "every intellectual called before a Congressional investigating committee should refuse to testify, and 'must be prepared for jail and economic ruin, in short, for the sacrifice of his personal welfare in the interest of the cultural welfare of his country'."

(During those hearings, Bella Dodd, former member of the Teachers' Union, testified about its communist infiltration and named Dale Zysman as a prominent communist within the union.)

Frauenglass did refuse to testify further – and he did lose his job.

== See also ==
- Political views of Albert Einstein

== External sources ==
- Einstein letter of May 16, 1953, to William Frauenglass
