= Babe Scheuer =

American football player (1913–1997)

No. 21, 16
- Position: Tackle

Personal information
- Born: January 12, 1913; Bronx, New York, U.S.
- Died: March 13, 1997 (aged 84); Michigan, U.S.
- Listed height: 6 ft 3 in (1.91 m)
- Listed weight: 240 lb (109 kg)

Career information
- High school: James Madison (Brooklyn, New York)
- College: NYU (1930–1933)

Career history
- New York Giants (1934); Orange Tornadoes (1936)

Awards and highlights
- NFL champion (1934)
- Stats at Pro Football Reference

Abraham Morris "Babe" Scheuer (January 2, 1913 – March 13, 1997) was an American professional football tackle who played one season with the New York Giants of the National Football League (NFL). He played college football at New York University.

== Early life and college ==
Abraham Morris Scheuer was born on January 2, 1913, in The Bronx. He attended James Madison High School in Brooklyn, New York.

He was a member of the NYU Violets of New York University from 1930 to 1933 and a three-year letterman from 1931 to 1933.

== Professional career ==
Scheuer signed with the New York Giants of the National Football League (NFL) in 1934. He was traded to the Brooklyn Dodgers on September 6 but was later released. He played in one game for the Giants during the 1934 season. On December 9, 1934, the Giants beat the Chicago Bears in the 1934 NFL Championship Game by a score of 30–13.

Scheuer played in three games, all starts, for the Orange Tornadoes of the American Association in 1936 and returned an interception for a touchdown.

== Personal life ==
Scheuer spent time as a shot putter after his NFL career. He died on March 13, 1997, in Michigan.
