= Alertness course =

Education course

Alertness course was a class mandated by local boards of education to make some teachers eligible for maximum salary.

According to Dr. Grace Fisher Ramsey of the American Museum of Natural History in 1938:

In some cities, as New York, the board of education required every teacher who had not yet reached the maximum salary to complete satisfactorily a thirty-hour course during the year immediately preceding the award of the regular salary increment. The result of such rulings was that many "Alertness Courses" for teachers-in-service were offered in this city."

The term appears in the testimony of William Frauenglass before the United States Senate Subcommittee on Internal Security on April 24, 1953:

Well, I was invited to speak, I was invited to give a lecture in the field of English literature. I have been active in the English Teachers Committee on Intercultural Education and also in my school, trying to carry into effect the program which the board of education was then interested in. the Springfield plan of introducing intercultural education into the school.
In my school when the first alertness course was given by the board of education in that field and the principal asked for somebody to volunteer to take part, I volunteered for the very first course, I think, given under the auspices of Mrs. Dubois at Textile High School, and I became in tensely interested in the subject and volunteered and was commended by the chairman of my department for introducing cultural activity into that field.
