= Religious and philosophical views of Albert Einstein =

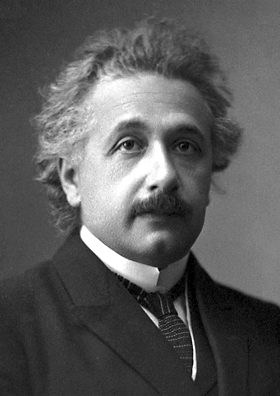
Albert Einstein, 1921

Albert Einstein's religious views have been widely studied and often misunderstood. Einstein stated "I believe in Spinoza's God". He did not believe in a personal God who concerns himself with fates and actions of human beings, a view which he described as naïve. He clarified, however, that, "I am not an atheist", preferring to call himself an agnostic, or a "religious nonbeliever." In other interviews, he noted his belief in a cosmic "lawgiver" who sets the laws of the universe. Einstein also stated he did not believe in life after death, adding "one life is enough for me." He was closely involved in his lifetime with several humanist groups. Einstein rejected a conflict between science and religion, and held that cosmic religion, defined in his book by that title as one “which recognizes neither dogmas nor God made in man’s image,” was necessary for science.

== Religious beliefs ==
In a 1929 interview with George Sylvester Viereck, Einstein stated:

I am not an Atheist. I do not know if I can define myself as a Pantheist. The problem involved is too vast for our limited minds.

In response to a telegram from Rabbi Herbert S. Goldstein asking whether he believed in God, Einstein replied:

I believe in Spinoza's God, who reveals Himself in the orderly harmony of what exists, not in a God who concerns Himself with fates and actions of human beings.

Einstein believed the problem of God was the "most difficult in the world"—a question that could not be answered "simply with yes or no".

Einstein explained his view on the relationship between science and religion in his lectures of 1939 and 1941:

"[A] religious person is devout in the sense that he has no doubt of the significance and loftiness of those superpersonal objects and goals which neither require nor are capable of rational foundation. They exist with the same necessity and matter-of-factness as he himself. In this sense religion is the age-old endeavor of mankind, to become clearly and completely conscious of these values and goals and constantly to strengthen and extend their effect. If one conceives of religion and science according to these definitions then a conflict between them appears impossible. For science can only ascertain what is but not what should be, and outside of its domain value judgments of all kinds remain necessary. Religion, on the other hand, deals only with evaluations of human thought and action: it cannot justifiably speak of facts and relationships between facts."

=== Early childhood ===
Einstein was raised by secular Jewish parents and attended a local Catholic public elementary school in Munich. In his Autobiographical Notes, Einstein wrote that he had gradually lost his faith early in childhood:

... I came—though the child of entirely irreligious (Jewish) parents—to a deep religiousness, which, however, reached an abrupt end at the age of twelve. Through the reading of popular scientific books I soon reached the conviction that much in the stories of the Bible could not be true.

=== Personal God ===
Einstein expressed his skepticism regarding the existence of a personal god, often describing this view as "naïve" and "childlike". In a letter written in 1947, he stated that "The idea of a personal God seems to me an anthropological concept that I cannot take seriously." In a letter to Beatrice Frohlich on 17 December 1952, Einstein stated, "The idea of a personal God is quite alien to me and seems even naïve."

Prompted by his colleague L. E. J. Brouwer, Einstein read the philosopher Eric Gutkind's book Choose Life, a discussion of the relationship between Jewish revelation and the modern world. On January 3, 1954, Einstein replied to Gutkind: "The word God is for me nothing more than the expression and product of human weaknesses, the Bible a collection of honourable, but still primitive legends which are nevertheless pretty childish. .... For me the Jewish religion like all other religions is an incarnation of the most childish superstitions." In 2018, his letter to Gutkind was sold for $2.9 million.

On 22 March 1954, Einstein received a letter from Joseph Dispentiere, an Italian immigrant who had worked as an experimental machinist in New Jersey. Dispentiere had declared himself an atheist and was disappointed by a news report that had cast Einstein as conventionally religious. Einstein replied on 24 March 1954:

It was, of course, a lie what you read about my religious convictions, a lie which is being systematically repeated. I do not believe in a personal God and I have never denied this but have expressed it clearly. If something is in me which can be called religious then it is the unbounded admiration for the structure of the world so far as our science can reveal it.

In his book Ideas and Opinions (1954), Einstein stated, "In their struggle for the ethical good, teachers of religion must have the stature to give up the doctrine of a personal God, that is, give up that source of fear and hope which in the past placed such vast power in the hands of priests." In December 1922, Einstein said the following on the idea of a saviour, "Denominational traditions I can only consider historically and psychologically; they have no other significance for me.

=== Pantheism and Spinoza's God ===
Einstein had explored the idea that humans could not understand the nature of God. In an interview published in George Sylvester Viereck's book Glimpses of the Great (1930), Einstein responded to a question about whether or not he defined himself as a pantheist. He explained:

Your question is the most difficult in the world. It is not a question I can answer simply with yes or no. I am not an Atheist. I do not know if I can define myself as a Pantheist. The problem involved is too vast for our limited minds. May I not reply with a parable? The human mind, no matter how highly trained, cannot grasp the universe. We are in the position of a little child, entering a huge library whose walls are covered to the ceiling with books in many different tongues. The child knows that someone must have written those books. It does not know who or how. It does not understand the languages in which they are written. The child notes a definite plan in the arrangement of the books, a mysterious order, which it does not comprehend, but only dimly suspects. That, it seems to me, is the attitude of the human mind, even the greatest and most cultured, toward God. We see a universe marvelously arranged, obeying certain laws, but we understand the laws only dimly. Our limited minds cannot grasp the mysterious force that sways the constellations. I am fascinated by Spinoza's Pantheism. I admire even more his contributions to modern thought. Spinoza is the greatest of modern philosophers, because he is the first philosopher who deals with the soul and the body as one, not as two separate things.

Einstein stated, "My views are near those of Spinoza: admiration for the beauty of and belief in the logical simplicity of the order which we can grasp humbly and only imperfectly. I believe that we have to content ourselves with our imperfect knowledge and understanding and treat values and moral obligations as a purely human problem—the most important of all human problems."

On 24 April 1929, Einstein cabled Rabbi Herbert S. Goldstein in German: "I believe in Spinoza's God, who reveals himself in the harmony of all that exists, not in a God who concerns himself with the fate and the doings of mankind." He expanded on this in answers he gave to the Japanese magazine Kaizō in 1923:

Scientific research can reduce superstition by encouraging people to think and view things in terms of cause and effect. Certain it is that a conviction, akin to religious feeling, of the rationality and intelligibility of the world lies behind all scientific work of a higher order. [...] This firm belief, a belief bound up with a deep feeling, in a superior mind that reveals itself in the world of experience, represents my conception of God. In common parlance this may be described as "pantheistic" (Spinoza).

=== Agnosticism and atheism ===
Einstein said people could call him an agnostic rather than an atheist, stating: "I have repeatedly said that in my opinion the idea of a personal god is a childlike one. You may call me an agnostic, but I do not share the crusading spirit of the professional atheist whose fervor is mostly due to a painful act of liberation from the fetters of religious indoctrination received in youth. I prefer an attitude of humility corresponding to the weakness of our intellectual understanding of nature and of our own being." In an interview published by the German poet George Sylvester Viereck, Einstein stated, "I am not an Atheist." According to Prince Hubertus, Einstein said, "In view of such harmony in the cosmos which I, with my limited human mind, am able to recognize, there are yet people who say there is no God. But what really makes me angry is that they quote me for the support of such views."

In 1945, Guy Raner, Jr. wrote a letter to Einstein asking if it was true that a Jesuit priest had caused Einstein to convert from atheism. Einstein replied, "I have never talked to a Jesuit priest in my life and I am astonished by the audacity to tell such lies about me. From the viewpoint of a Jesuit priest I am, of course, and have always been an atheist. ... It is always misleading to use anthropomorphical concepts in dealing with things outside the human sphere—childish analogies. We have to admire in humility the beautiful harmony of the structure of this world—as far as we can grasp it, and that is all."

In a 1950 letter to M. Berkowitz, Einstein stated that "My position concerning God is that of an agnostic. I am convinced that a vivid consciousness of the primary importance of moral principles for the betterment and ennoblement of life does not need the idea of a law-giver, especially a law-giver who works on the basis of reward and punishment."

According to biographer Walter Isaacson, Einstein was more inclined to denigrate atheists than religious people. Einstein said in correspondence, "[T]he fanatical atheists...are like slaves who are still feeling the weight of their chains which they have thrown off after hard struggle. They are creatures who—in their grudge against the traditional 'opium of the people'—cannot hear the music of the spheres." Although he did not believe in a personal God, he indicated that he would never seek to combat such a belief because "such a belief seems to me preferable to the lack of any transcendental outlook."

Einstein, in a one-and-a-half-page hand-written German-language letter to philosopher Eric Gutkind, dated Princeton, New Jersey, 3 January 1954, a year and three and a half months before his death, wrote: "The word God is for me nothing but the expression and product of human weaknesses, the Bible a collection of venerable but still rather primitive legends. No interpretation, no matter how subtle, can (for me) change anything about this. [...] For me the Jewish religion like all other religions is an incarnation of the most childish superstition. [...] I cannot see anything 'chosen' about them [the Jewish people]."

=== Afterlife ===
On 17 July 1953, a woman who was a licensed Baptist pastor sent Einstein a letter asking if he had felt assured about attaining everlasting life with the Creator. Einstein replied, "I do not believe in immortality of the individual, and I consider ethics to be an exclusively human concern with no superhuman authority behind it." This sentiment was also expressed in Einstein's book The World as I See It (1935), "I cannot conceive of a God who rewards and punishes his creatures, or has a will of the type of which we are conscious in ourselves. An individual who should survive his physical death is also beyond my comprehension, nor do I wish it otherwise; such notions are for the fears or absurd egoism of feeble souls. Enough for me the mystery of the eternity of life, and the inkling of the marvellous structure of reality, together with the single-hearted endeavour to comprehend a portion, be it ever so tiny, of the reason that manifests itself in nature."

Einstein was averse to the Abrahamic conception of Heaven and Hell, particularly as it pertained to a system of everlasting reward and punishment. In a 1915 letter to the Swiss physicist Edgar Meyer, Einstein wrote, "I see only with deep regret that God punishes so many of His children for their numerous stupidities, for which only He Himself can be held responsible; in my opinion, only His nonexistence could excuse Him." He also stated, "I cannot imagine a God who rewards and punishes the objects of his creation, whose purposes are modeled after our own—a God, in short, who is but a reflection of human frailty. Neither can I believe that the individual survives the death of his body, although feeble souls harbor such thoughts through fear or ridiculous egotisms."

Part of Einstein's tension with the Abrahamic afterlife was his belief in determinism and his rejection of free will. Einstein stated, "The man who is thoroughly convinced of the universal operation of the law of causation cannot for a moment entertain the idea of a being who interferes in the course of events—that is, if he takes the hypothesis of causality really seriously. He has no use for the religion of fear and equally little for social or moral religion. A God who rewards and punishes is inconceivable to him for the simple reason that a man's actions are determined by necessity, external and internal, so that in God's eyes he cannot be responsible, any more than an inanimate object is responsible for the motions it goes through."

=== Cosmic spirituality ===
In 1930, Einstein published a widely discussed essay about his beliefs in The New York Times Magazine. With the title "Religion and Science," Einstein distinguished three human impulses which develop religious belief: fear, social or moral concerns, and a cosmic religious feeling. A primitive understanding of causality causes fear, and the fearful invent supernatural beings analogous to themselves. The desire for love and support creates a social and moral need for a supreme being; both these styles have an anthropomorphic concept of God. The third style, which Einstein deemed most mature, originates in a deep sense of awe and mystery. He said, the individual feels "the sublimity and marvelous order which reveal themselves in nature ... and he wants to experience the universe as a single significant whole." Einstein saw science as an antagonist of the first two styles of religious belief, but as a partner in the third. He maintained, "even though the realms of religion and science in themselves are clearly marked off from each other," there are "strong reciprocal relationships and dependencies" as aspirations for truth derive from the religious sphere. He continued:

A person who is religiously enlightened appears to me to be one who has, to the best of his ability, liberated himself from the fetters of his selfish desires and is preoccupied with thoughts, feelings and aspirations to which he clings because of their super-personal value. It seems to me that what is important is the force of this superpersonal content ... regardless of whether any attempt is made to unite this content with a Divine Being, for otherwise it would not be possible to count Buddha and Spinoza as religious personalities. Accordingly a religious person is devout in the sense that he has no doubt of the significance of those super-personal objects and goals which neither require nor are capable of rational foundation ... In this sense religion is the age-old endeavor of mankind to become clearly and completely conscious of these values and goals and constantly to strengthen and extend their effect. If one conceives of religion and science according to these definitions then a conflict between them appears impossible. For science can only ascertain what is, but not what should be...

An understanding of causality was fundamental to Einstein's ethical beliefs. In Einstein's view, "the doctrine of a personal God interfering with natural events could never be refuted, in the real sense, by science," for religion can always take refuge in areas that science can not yet explain. It was Einstein's belief that in the "struggle for the ethical good, teachers of religion must have the stature to give up the doctrine of a personal God, that is, give up that source of fear and hope" and cultivate the "Good, the True, and the Beautiful in humanity itself."

In his 1934 book The World as I See It, Einstein expanded on his religiosity, "A knowledge of the existence of something we cannot penetrate, of the manifestations of the profoundest reason and the most radiant beauty, which are only accessible to our reason in their most elementary forms — it is this knowledge and this emotion that constitute the truly religious attitude; in this sense, and in this alone, I am a deeply religious man."

In 1936, Einstein received a letter from a young girl in the sixth grade. She had asked him, with the encouragement of her teacher, if scientists pray. Einstein replied in the most elementary way he could:

Scientific research is based on the idea that everything that takes place is determined by laws of nature, and therefore this holds for the actions of people. For this reason, a research scientist will hardly be inclined to believe that events could be influenced by a prayer, i.e., by a wish addressed to a supernatural being. However, it must be admitted that our actual knowledge of these laws is only imperfect and fragmentary, so that, actually, the belief in the existence of basic all-embracing laws in nature also rests on a sort of faith. All the same this faith has been largely justified so far by the success of scientific research. But, on the other hand, everyone who is seriously involved in the pursuit of science becomes convinced that a spirit is manifest in the laws of the universe—a spirit vastly superior to that of man, and one in the face of which we with our modest powers must feel humble. In this way the pursuit of science leads to a religious feeling of a special sort, which is indeed quite different from the religiosity of someone more naive.”

Einstein characterized himself as "devoutly religious" in the following sense: "The most beautiful emotion we can experience is the mystical. It is the power of all true art and science. He to whom this emotion is a stranger, who can no longer wonder and stand rapt in awe, is as good as dead. To know that what is impenetrable to us really exists, manifesting itself as the highest wisdom and the most radiant beauty, which our dull faculties can comprehend only in their most primitive forms—this knowledge, this feeling, is at the center of true religiousness. In this sense, and in this sense only, I belong to the rank of devoutly religious men."

In December 1952, he commented on what inspires his religiosity, "My feeling is religious insofar as I am imbued with the insufficiency of the human mind to understand more deeply the harmony of the universe which we try to formulate as 'laws of nature.'" In a letter to Maurice Solovine Einstein spoke about his reasons for using the word "religious" to describe his spiritual feelings, "I can understand your aversion to the use of the term 'religion' to describe an emotional and psychological attitude which shows itself most clearly in Spinoza. (But) I have not found a better expression than 'religious' for the trust in the rational nature of reality that is, at least to a certain extent, accessible to human reason."

Einstein frequently referred to his belief system as "cosmic religion" and authored an eponymous article on the subject in 1954, which later became his book Ideas and Opinions in 1955. The belief system recognized a "miraculous order which manifests itself in all of nature as well as in the world of ideas," devoid of a personal God who rewards and punishes individuals based on their behavior. It rejected a conflict between science and religion, and held that cosmic religion was necessary for science. For Einstein, "science without religion is lame, religion without science is blind." He told William Hermanns in an interview that "God is a mystery. But a comprehensible mystery. I have nothing but awe when I observe the laws of nature. There are not laws without a lawgiver, but how does this lawgiver look? Certainly not like a man magnified." He smiled, "Some centuries ago, I would have been burned or hanged. Nonetheless, I would have been in good company." Einstein devised a theology for the cosmic religion, wherein the rational discovery of the secrets of nature is a religious act. His religion and his philosophy were integral parts of the same package as his scientific discoveries.

=== Jewish identity ===
In a letter to Eric Gutkind dated 3 January 1954, Einstein wrote in German, "For me the Jewish religion like all others is an incarnation of the most childish superstitions. And the Jewish people to whom I gladly belong and with whose mentality I have a deep affinity have no different quality for me than all other people. As far as my experience goes, they are also no better than other human groups, although they are protected from the worst cancers by a lack of power. Otherwise I cannot see anything 'chosen' about them."

In 1938, Einstein discussed "the hatred of the Jews by those who shun popular enlightenment. More than anything else in the world, they fear the influence of men of intellectual independence. I see in this the essential cause for the savage hatred of Jews raging in present-day Germany. To the Nazi group the Jews are not merely a means for turning the resentment of the people away from themselves, the oppressors; they see the Jews as a nonassimilable element that cannot be driven into uncritical acceptance of dogma, and that, therefore as long as it exists at all—threatens their authority because of its insistence on popular enlightenment of the masses."

In an interview published by Time magazine with George Sylvester Viereck, Einstein spoke of his feelings about Christianity. Born in Germany, Viereck supported National Socialism but he was not antisemitic. And like Einstein he was a pacifist. At the time of the interview, Einstein was informed that Viereck was not Jewish, but stated that Viereck had "the psychic adaptability of the Jew," making it possible for Einstein to talk to him "without barrier." Viereck began by asking Einstein if he considered himself a German or a Jew, to which Einstein responded, "It's possible to be both." Viereck moved along in the interview to ask Einstein if Jews should try to assimilate, to which Einstein replied, "We Jews have been too eager to sacrifice our idiosyncrasies in order to conform." Einstein was then asked to what extent Christianity influenced him. "As a child, I received instruction both in the Bible and in the Talmud. I am a Jew, but I am enthralled by the luminous figure of the Nazarene." Einstein was then asked if he accepted the historicity of Jesus, to which he replied, "Unquestionably! No one can read the Gospels without feeling the actual presence of Jesus. His personality pulsates in every word. No myth is filled with such life."

In a conversation with the Dutch poet Willem Frederik Hermans Einstein stressed that, "I seriously doubt that Jesus himself said that he was God, for he was too much a Jew to violate that great commandment: Hear O Israel, the Eternal is our God and He is one!' and not two or three." Einstein lamented, "Sometimes I think it would have been better if Jesus had never lived. No name was so abused for the sake of power!" In his 1934 book The World as I See It he expressed his belief that "if one purges the Judaism of the Prophets and Christianity as Jesus Christ taught it of all subsequent additions, especially those of the priests, one is left with a teaching which is capable of curing all the social ills of humanity." Later, in a 1943 interview, Einstein added, "It is quite possible that we can do greater things than Jesus, for what is written in the Bible about him is poetically embellished."

Einstein interpreted the concept of a Kingdom of God as referring to the best people. "I have always believed that Jesus meant by the Kingdom of God the small group scattered all through time of intellectually and ethically valuable people."

In the last year of his life, he said, "If I were not a Jew I would be a Quaker."

=== Views of the Christian churches ===
The only Jewish school in Munich had been closed in 1872 for want of students, and in the absence of an alternative, Einstein attended a Catholic elementary school. He also received Jewish religious education at home, but he did not see a division between the two faiths, as he perceived the "sameness of all religions". Einstein was equally impressed by the stories of the Hebrew Bible and the Passion of Jesus. According to biographer Walter Isaacson, Einstein immensely enjoyed the Catholic religion courses which he received at the school. The teachers at his school were liberal and generally made no distinction among students' religions, though some harbored a mild but ingrained antisemitism. Einstein later recalled an incident involving a teacher who particularly liked him, "One day that teacher brought a long nail to the lesson and told the students that with such nails Christ had been nailed to the Cross by the Jews" and that "Among the children at the elementary school anti-Semitism was prevalent...Physical attacks and insults on the way home from school were frequent, but for the most part not too vicious." Einstein noted, "That was at a Catholic school; how much worse the antisemitism must be in other Prussian schools, one can only imagine." He would later in life recall that "The religion of the fathers, as I encountered it in Munich during religious instruction and in the synagogue, repelled rather than attracted me."

Einstein met several times and collaborated with the Belgian priest scientist Georges Lemaître, of the Catholic University of Leuven. Lemaître is known as the first proponent of the Big Bang theory of the origins of the cosmos and a pioneer in applying Einstein's theory of general relativity to cosmology. Einstein proposed Lemaitre for the 1934 Francqui Prize, which he received from the Belgian King.

In 1940, Time magazine quoted Einstein lauding the Catholic Church for its role in opposing the Nazis:

Only the Church stood squarely across the path of Hitler's campaign for suppressing truth. I never had any special interest in the Church before, but now I feel a great affection and admiration because the Church alone has had the courage and persistence to stand for intellectual truth and moral freedom. I am forced thus to confess that what I once despised I now praise unreservedly.

The quotation has since been repeatedly cited by defenders of Pope Pius XII. An investigation of the quotation by mathematician William C. Waterhouse and Barbara Wolff of the Einstein Archives in Jerusalem found that the statement was mentioned in an unpublished letter from 1947. In the letter to Count Montgelas, Einstein explained that the original comment was a casual one made to a journalist regarding the support of "a few churchmen" for individual rights and intellectual freedom during the early rule of Hitler and that, according to Einstein, the comment had been drastically exaggerated.

On 11 November 1950, a Brooklyn pastor named Cornelius Greenway wrote a letter to Einstein, which had also quoted his alleged remarks about the Church. Einstein responded, "I am, however, a little embarrassed. The wording of the statement you have quoted is not my own. Shortly after Hitler came to power in Germany I had an oral conversation with a newspaper man about these matters. Since then my remarks have been elaborated and exaggerated nearly beyond recognition. I cannot in good conscience write down the statement you sent me as my own. The matter is all the more embarrassing to me because I, like yourself, I am predominantly critical concerning the activities, and especially the political activities, through history of the official clergy. Thus, my former statement, even if reduced to my actual words (which I do not remember in detail), gives a wrong impression of my general attitude."

In 2008, the Antiques Roadshow television program aired a manuscript expert, Catherine Williamson, authenticating a 1943 letter from Einstein in which he confirms that he "made a statement which corresponds approximately" to Time magazine's quotation of him. However, Einstein continued, "I made this statement during the first years of the Nazi regime—much earlier than 1940—and my expressions were a little more moderate."

==== William Hermanns conversations ====
Einstein's conversations with William Hermanns were recorded over a 34-year correspondence. In the conversations, Einstein makes various statements about the Christian Churches in general and the Catholic Church in particular: "When you learn the history of the Catholic Church, you wouldn't trust the Center Party. Hasn't Hitler promised to smash the Bolsheviks in Russia? The Church will bless its Catholic soldiers to march alongside the Nazis" (March 1930). "I predict that the Vatican will support Hitler if he comes to power. The Church since Constantine has always favoured the authoritarian State, as long as the State allows the Church to baptize and instruct the masses" (March 1930). "So often in history the Jews have been the instigators of justice and reform whether in Spain, Germany or Russia. But no sooner have they done their job than their 'friends', often blessed by the Church, spit in their faces" (August 1943).

"But what makes me shudder is that the Catholic Church is silent. One doesn't need to be a prophet to say, 'The Catholic Church will pay for this silence...I do not say that the unspeakable crimes of the Church for 2,000 years had always the blessing of the Vatican, but it vaccinated its believers with the idea: We have the true God, and the Jews have crucified Him.' The Church sowed hate instead of love, though the ten commandments state: Thou shalt not kill" (August 1943). "With a few exceptions, the Roman Catholic Church has stressed the value of dogma and ritual, conveying the idea theirs is the only way to reach heaven. I don't need to go to Church to hear if I'm good or bad; my heart tells me this" (August 1943). "I don't like to implant in youth the Church's doctrine of a personal God, because that Church has behaved so inhumanly in the past 2,000 years... Consider the hate the Church manifested against the Jews and then against the Muslims, the Crusades with their crimes, the burning stakes of the inquisition, the tacit consent of Hitler's actions while the Jews and the Poles dug their own graves and were slaughtered. And Hitler is said to have been an altar boy!" (August 1943).

"Yes," Einstein replied vehemently, "It is indeed human, as proved by Cardinal Pacelli (the future Pope Pius XII), who was behind the Concordat with Hitler. Since when can one make a pact with Christ and Satan at the same time?" (August 1943). "The Church has always sold itself to those in power, and agreed to any bargain in return for immunity." (August 1943) "If I were allowed to give advice to the Churches," Einstein continued, "I would tell them to begin with a conversion among themselves, and to stop playing power politics. Consider what mass misery they have produced in Spain, South America and Russia." (September 1948).

In response to a Catholic convert who asked, "Didn't you state that the Church was the only opponent of Communism?" Einstein replied, "I don't have to emphasise that the Church [sic] at last became a strong opponent of National Socialism, as well." Einstein's secretary Helen Dukas added, "Dr. Einstein didn't mean only the Catholic church, but all churches." When the convert mentioned that the Nazis had gassed his family members, Einstein replied that "he also felt guilty—adding that the whole Church, beginning with the Vatican, should feel guilt" (September 1948).

When asked for more precise responses in 1954, Einstein replied: "About God, I cannot accept any concept based on the authority of the Church. [...] As long as I can remember, I have resented mass indoctrination. I do not believe in the fear of life, in the fear of death, in blind faith. I cannot prove to you that there is no personal God, but if I were to speak of him, I would be a liar. I do not believe in the God of theology who rewards good and punishes evil. My God created laws that take care of that. His universe is not ruled by wishful thinking but by immutable laws." William Miller of Life Magazine who was present at this meeting described Einstein as looking like a "living saint" and speaking with "angelic indifference."

== Philosophical beliefs ==
From a young age he had an interest in philosophy. Einstein said about himself: "As a young man I preferred books whose content concerned a whole world view and, in particular, philosophical ones. Schopenhauer, David Hume, Mach, to some extent Kant, Plato, Aristotle."

=== Relationship between science and philosophy ===
Einstein believed that when trying to understand nature one should engage in both philosophical enquiry and enquiry through the natural sciences.

Einstein believed that epistemology and science "are dependent upon each other. Epistemology without contact with science becomes an empty scheme. Science without epistemology is—insofar as it is thinkable at all—primitive and muddled."

=== Free will ===
Like Spinoza, Einstein was a strict determinist who believed that human behavior was completely determined by causal laws. For that reason, he refused the chance aspect of quantum theory, famously telling Niels Bohr: "God does not play dice with the universe." In letters sent to physicist Max Born, Einstein revealed his belief in causal relationships:

You believe in a God who plays dice, and I in complete law and order in a world which objectively exists, and which I in a wildly speculative way, am trying to capture. I firmly believe, but I hope that someone will discover a more realistic way, or rather a more tangible basis than it has been my lot to find. Even the great initial success of the quantum theory does not make me believe in the fundamental dice game, although I am well aware that some of our younger colleagues interpret this as a consequence of senility.

Einstein's emphasis on 'belief' and how it connected with determinism was illustrated in a letter of condolence responding to news of the death of Michele Besso, one of his lifelong friends. Einstein wrote to the family: "Now he has departed from this strange world a little ahead of me. That signifies nothing. For us believing physicists the distinction between past, present, and future is only a stubbornly persistent illusion."

Einstein had admitted to a fascination with philosopher Spinoza's deterministic version of pantheism. American philosopher Charles Hartshorne, in seeking to distinguish deterministic views with his own belief of free will panentheism, coined the distinct typology "Classical pantheism" to distinguish the views of those who hold similar positions to Spinoza's deterministic version of pantheism.

He was also an incompatibilist; in 1932 he said:

I do not believe in free will. Schopenhauer's words: 'Man can do what he wants, but he cannot will what he wills,' accompany me in all situations throughout my life and reconcile me with the actions of others, even if they are rather painful to me. This awareness of the lack of free will keeps me from taking myself and my fellow men too seriously as acting and deciding individuals, and from losing my temper.

And yet, Einstein maintains that whether or not a particular human life is meaningful depends on how the individual conceives of his or her own life with respect to the lives of fellow human beings. A primitive human being in this regard is one whose life is entirely devoted to the gratification of instinctual needs. Whereas Einstein accepts that the gratification of basic needs is a legitimate and indispensable goal, he regards it nevertheless as an elementary goal. The transition of the human mind from its initial and infantile state of disconnectedness (selfishness) to a state of unity with the universe, according to Einstein, requires the exercise of four types of freedoms: freedom from self, freedom of expression, freedom from time, and freedom of independence.

=== Humanism and moral philosophy ===
Einstein was a secular humanist and a supporter of the Ethical Culture movement. He served on the advisory board of the First Humanist Society of New York. For the seventy-fifth anniversary of the New York Society for Ethical Culture, he stated that the idea of Ethical Culture embodied his personal conception of what is most valuable and enduring in religious idealism. He observed, "Without 'ethical culture' there is no salvation for humanity." He was an honorary associate of the British humanist organization the Rationalist Press Association. Its periodical, today known as New Humanist magazine, was famously seen at the top of his reading pile at the time of his death.

With regard to punishment by God, Einstein stated, "I cannot imagine a God who rewards and punishes the objects of his creation, whose purposes are modeled after our own — a God, in short, who is but a reflection of human frailty. Neither can I believe that the individual survives the death of his body, although feeble souls harbor such thoughts through fear or ridiculous egotisms." "A God who rewards and punishes is inconceivable to him for the simple reason that a man's actions are determined by necessity, external and internal, so that in God's eyes he cannot be responsible, any more than an inanimate object is responsible for the motions it undergoes. Science has therefore been charged with undermining morality, but the charge is unjust. A man's ethical behavior should be based effectually on sympathy, education, and social ties and needs; no religious basis is necessary. Man would indeed be in a poor way if he had to be restrained by fear of punishment and hopes of reward after death. It is therefore easy to see why the churches have always fought science and persecuted its devotees."

On the importance of ethics he wrote, "The most important human endeavor is the striving for morality in our actions. Our inner balance and even our very existence depend on it. Only morality in our actions can give beauty and dignity to life. To make this a living force and bring it to clear consciousness is perhaps the foremost task of education. The foundation of morality should not be made dependent on myth nor tied to any authority lest doubt about the myth or about the legitimacy of the authority imperil the foundation of sound judgment and action." "I do not believe that a man should be restrained in his daily actions by being afraid of punishment after death or that he should do things only because in this way he will be rewarded after he dies. This does not make sense. The proper guidance during the life of a man should be the weight that he puts upon ethics and the amount of consideration that he has for others." "I cannot conceive of a personal God who would directly influence the actions of individuals, or would directly sit in judgment on creatures of his own creation. I cannot do this in spite of the fact that mechanistic causality has, to a certain extent, been placed in doubt by modern science. My religiosity consists in a humble admiration of the infinitely superior spirit that reveals itself in the little that we, with our weak and transitory understanding, can comprehend of reality. Morality is of the highest importance—but for us, not for God."

=== Teleology ===
In a conversation with Ugo Onufri in 1955, with regards to nature's purpose he said, "I have never imputed to Nature a purpose or goal, or anything that could be understood as anthropomorphic." In a 1947 letter he stated, "I feel also not able to imagine some will or goal outside the human sphere."

=== Epistemology ===
==== Naïve realism ====
Einstein believed naïve realism was "relatively simple" to disprove. He agreed with Bertrand Russell that humans observe the qualities objects have on them (greenness, coldness, hardness, etc.) and not the actual objects themselves.

==== Positivism ====
Einstein declared that he was no positivist, a philosophical system that declares that only those statements that are verifiable through direct observation or logical proof are useful in determining truth. Einstein maintained that people validly use certain ideas and values, such as intuition or religious faith, which cannot be proven with direct observation or logic.

Einstein acknowledged however that positivist thinkers, such as Ernst Mach, had a deep influence on him in his early years. Regarding relativity theory, he writes: "the whole direction of thought of this theory conforms with Mach's..." Though Einstein maintained that Mach's positivism is unfruitful in theory development, he considered that positivism was still useful, commenting that: "It [positivistic philosophy] cannot give birth to anything living, it can only exterminate harmful vermin."

===== Transcendental Idealism =====
Einstein considered that Kant’s "denial of the objectivity of space can (...) hardly be taken seriously". He also believed that "if Kant had known what is known to us today of the natural order, I am certain that he would have fundamentally revised his philosophical conclusions. Kant built his structure upon the foundations of the world outlook of Kepler and Newton. Now that the foundation has been undermined, the structure no longer stands."

=== Opinions on philosophers ===
==== David Hume ====
Einstein was an admirer of the philosophy of David Hume; in 1944 he said "If one reads Hume’s books, one is amazed that many and sometimes even highly esteemed philosophers after him have been able to write so much obscure stuff and even find grateful readers for it. Hume has permanently influenced the development of the best philosophers who came after him." In a letter to Moritz Schlick Einstein remarked that he had read Hume's book An Enquiry Concerning Human Understanding "with eagerness and admiration shortly before finding relativity theory" and that "very possibly, I wouldn't have come to the solution without those philosophical studies".

==== Immanuel Kant ====
Some sources maintain that Einstein read the three Critiques at the age of 16 and studied Kant as a teenager. However Philip Stamp states that this is contradicted by some of his own claims. In 1949, Einstein said that he "did not grow up in the Kantian tradition, but came to understand the truly valuable which is to be found in his doctrine, alongside of errors which today are quite obvious, only quite late."

In one of Einstein's letters in 1918 to Max Born, Einstein said that he was starting to discover this "truly valuable" in Kant: "I am reading Kant's Prolegomena here, among other things, and I am beginning to comprehend the enormous suggestive power that emanated from the fellow, and still does. Once you concede to him merely the existence of synthetic a priori judgements, you are trapped. Anyway it is nice to read him, even if it is not as good as his predecessor Hume's work. Hume also had a far sounder instinct."

Einstein explained the significance of Kant's philosophy as follows:

Hume saw that concepts which we must regard as essential, such as, for example, causal connection, cannot be gained from material given to us by the senses. This insight led him to a sceptical attitude as concerns knowledge of any kind. Man has an intense desire for assured knowledge. That is why Hume's clear message seems crushing: the sensory raw material, the only source of our knowledge, through habit may lead us to belief and expectation but not to the knowledge and still less to the understanding of lawful relations. Then Kant took the stage with an idea which, though certainly untenable in the form in which he put it, signified a step towards the solution of Hume's dilemma: if we have definitely assured knowledge, it must be grounded in reason itself.

==== Arthur Schopenhauer ====
Schopenhauer's views on the independence of spatially separated systems influenced Einstein, who called him a genius. In their view it was a necessary assumption that the mere difference in location suffices to make two systems different, with each having its own real physical state, independent of the state of the other.

In Einstein's Berlin study three figures hung on the wall: Faraday, Maxwell and Schopenhauer. Einstein described, concerning the personal importance of Schopenhauer for him, Schopenhauer's words as "a continual consolation in the face of life’s hardships, my own and others’, and an unfailing wellspring of tolerance." Although Schopenhauer's works are known for their pessimism, Konrad Wachsmann remembered, "He often sat with one of the well-worn Schopenhauer volumes, and as he sat there, he seemed so pleased, as if he were engaged with a serene and cheerful work."

==== Ernst Mach ====
Einstein liked Ernst Mach's scientific work, though not his philosophical work. He said "Mach was as good a scholar of mechanics as he was a deplorable philosopher". However, Einstein's early epistemological views were deeply influenced by Mach. In his "Autobiographical Notes," he writes: "I see Mach's greatness in his incorruptible skepticism and independence; in my younger years, however, Mach's epistemological position also influenced me very greatly, a position which today appears to me to be essentially untenable."

==== Ancient Greeks ====
Einstein expressed his admiration for the Ancient Greek philosophers, pointing out that he had been far more interested in them than in science. He also noted; "The more I read the Greeks, the more I realize that nothing like them has ever appeared in the world since.”

== See also ==
- Political views of Albert Einstein
- Religious views of Isaac Newton
