= Why Socialism? =

1949 article by Albert Einstein

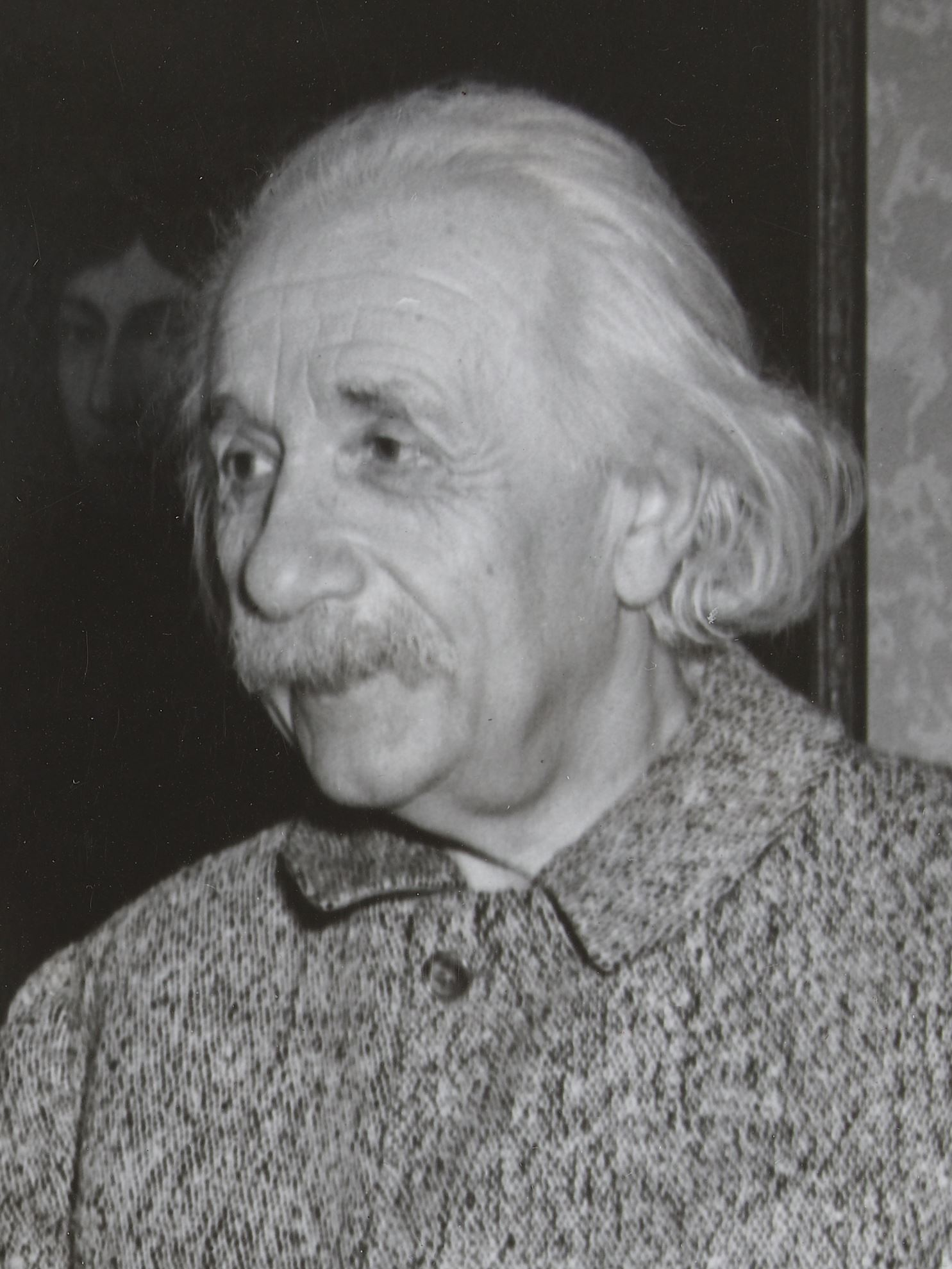
Albert Einstein in 1949, the year he wrote "Why Socialism?"

"Why Socialism?" is an article written by Albert Einstein in May 1949 that appeared in the first issue of the socialist journal Monthly Review. It addresses problems with capitalism, predatory economic competition, and growing wealth inequality. It highlights control of mass media by private capitalists making it difficult for citizens to arrive at objective conclusions, and political parties being influenced by wealthy financial backers resulting in an "oligarchy of private capital". Einstein concludes that these problems can only be corrected with a planned economy where the means of production are owned by society itself, and which maintains a strong democracy to protect the rights of individuals.

== Contents ==
According to Einstein, the profit motive of a capitalist society, in conjunction with competition among capitalists, leads to unnecessary cycles of booms and depressions, and ultimately encourages selfishness instead of cooperation. In addition, the educational system of such a society would be severely undermined because people will educate themselves only to advance their careers. This results in the "crippling of individuals" and the erosion of human creativity. Unrestrained competition in a capitalist society leads to a huge waste of labor and causes economic anarchy, which Einstein denounces as the real source of capitalism's evil:

The economic anarchy of capitalist society as it exists today is, in my opinion, the real source of the evil.

Einstein predicted that under such a capitalist society, political parties and politicians would be corrupted by financial contributions made by owners of large capital amounts, and the system "cannot be effectively checked even by a democratically organized political society". The essay concludes with Einstein's analysis on how to solve these problems through a planned economy:

I am convinced there is only one way to eliminate these grave evils, namely through the establishment of a socialist economy, accompanied by an educational system which would be oriented toward social goals.

Einstein asserts that a planned economy that adjusts to production would guarantee a livelihood to every member of society:

In such an economy, the means of production are owned by society itself and are utilized in a planned fashion. A planned economy, which adjusts production to the needs of the community, would distribute the work to be done among all those able to work and would guarantee a livelihood to every man, woman, and child. The education of the individual, in addition to promoting his own innate abilities, would attempt to develop in him a sense of responsibility for his fellow men in place of the glorification of power and success in our present society.

In his final words, Einstein cautioned that "a planned economy is not yet socialism", since it may also be accompanied by an "all-powerful" bureaucracy that leads to the "complete enslavement of the individual". He asks "How can the rights of the individual be protected and therewith a democratic counterweight to the power of bureaucracy be assured?"

== Motivation ==
Regarding his motivation for publishing the article, Einstein believed Monthly Review would be a good forum for socialist ideas:

Clarity about the aims and problems of socialism is of greatest significance in our age of transition. Since, under present circumstances, free and unhindered discussion of these problems has come under a powerful taboo, I consider the foundation of this magazine [Monthly Review] to be an important public service.

Private capital tends to become concentrated in few hands, partly because of competition among the capitalists, and partly because technological development and the increasing division of labor encourage the formation of larger units of production at the expense of smaller ones. The result of these developments is an oligarchy of private capital the enormous power of which cannot be effectively checked even by a democratically organized political society. This is true since the members of legislative bodies are selected by political parties, largely financed or otherwise influenced by private capitalists who, for all practical purposes, separate the electorate from the legislature. The consequence is that the representatives of the people do not in fact sufficiently protect the interests of the underprivileged sections of the population. Moreover, under existing conditions, private capitalists inevitably control, directly or indirectly, the main sources of information (press, radio, education). It is thus extremely difficult, and indeed in most cases quite impossible, for the individual citizen to come to objective conclusions and to make intelligent use of his political rights.

== See also ==
- Political views of Albert Einstein
- Korets–Landau leaflet
