= David Folkenflik =

American journalist (born 1969)

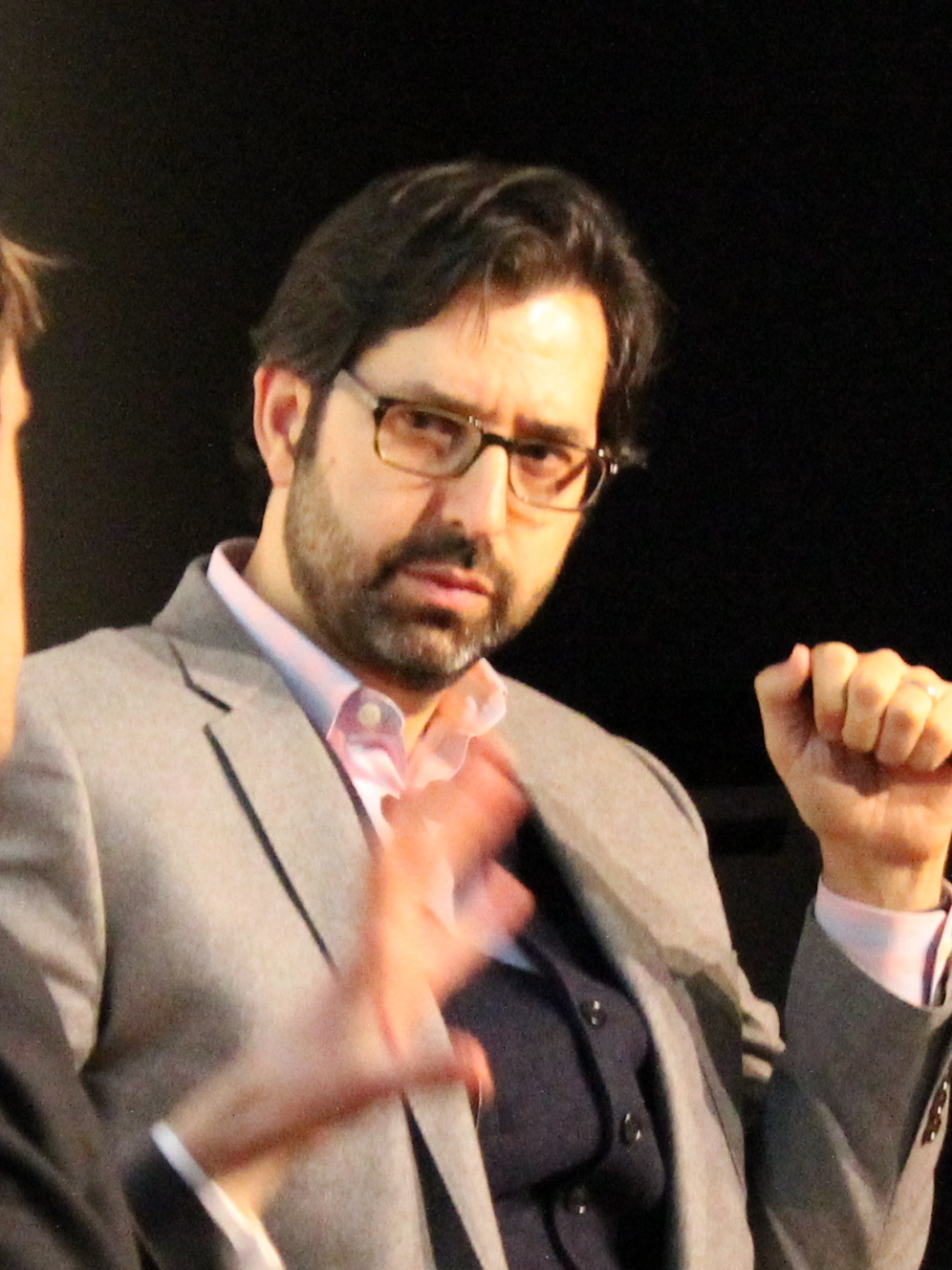
- Folkenflik in 2014
- Born: September 15, 1969 (age 56)
- Education: B.A. Cornell University
- Occupation: Reporter
- Known for: Media correspondent for NPR
- Spouse: Jesse Baker
- Parent(s): Vivian Folkenflik and Robert Folkenflik

David Folkenflik (born September 15, 1969) is an American reporter based in New York City and serving as media correspondent for NPR. He was also one of the hosts of NPR and WBUR-FM's On Point. His work primarily appears on the NPR news programs Morning Edition and All Things Considered. He also appeared regularly on the "Media Circus" segment on the former Talk of the Nation.

== Early life and education ==
Folkenflik is the son of Vivian and Robert Folkenflik, both college professors at the University of California, Irvine. He is of Jewish descent.

In 1991, he graduated from Cornell University with a degree in history. At Cornell, he was editor in chief of The Cornell Daily Sun and a member of the Quill and Dagger, Cornell's senior honor society.

== Career ==
Folkenflik started at The Herald-Sun of Durham, North Carolina. He spent more than 10 years at The Baltimore Sun, covering higher education, the United States Congress, and the mass media, before joining NPR in 2004.

He has reported on many topics, including the undisclosed payments made by New York Times reporter Kurt Eichenwald to a teenaged webcam child pornographer named Justin Berry and on the ethical challenges faced by reporters who are also medical doctors who have travelled to Haiti to report on and assist with the recovery after the 2010 Haiti earthquake.

Folkenflik is the author of Murdoch's World: The Last of the Old Media Empires, a 2013 history of Rupert Murdoch's global media influence with a focus on the United Kingdom scandals of News Corporation.

== Personal life ==
In 2010, Folkenflik married Jesse Baker.
