= Vivian Folkenflik =

American translator

- Born: Vivian Perlstein; August 21, 1940; Brooklyn, New York City, U.S.
- Died: October 28, 2023 (aged 83); Montclair, New Jersey, U.S.
- Occupations: Educator, translator
- Children: 2, including David Folkenflik

Vivian Perlstein Folkenflik (August 21, 1940 – October 28, 2023) was an American educator and translator; she was a lecturer at the University of California, Irvine, and translated works from French, by writers Germaine de Staël and others.

== Early life and education ==
Perlstein was born in Brooklyn, New York City, the daughter of Jacob Perlstein and Natalie Brettschneider Perlstein. Her family was Jewish; her father was a cardiologist and her mother was a school librarian. She graduated from James Madison High School in 1957, and from Radcliffe College. She traveled in Europe in 1958. She earned a master's degree in French literature at Cornell University, and was working on a doctorate when she married a fellow graduate student in 1965.

== Career ==
Folkenflik translated into English several works by French writers, including Germaine de Staël, Jacqueline Chénieux-Gendron, and Anne-Gédéon de La Fitte, Marquis de Pelleport. She taught humanities courses at the University of California, Irvine, where her husband was a professor of English. She retired from UCI in 2012.

== Publications ==
- "Vision and Truth: Baroque Art Metaphors in Guzmán de Alfarache" (1973)
- "Words and Language in Father and Son" (1979, with Robert Folkenflik)
- An Extraordinary Woman: Selected Writings of Germaine de Staël (1987, introduction)
- Chénieux-Gendron, Surrealism (1990, translator)
- Major Writings of Germaine De Stael (1992, translator)
- Pelleport, The Bohemians (2011, translator)

== Personal life ==
Perlstein married Robert Folkenflik in 1965. They had two children, Nora and David, and lived in Laguna Beach, California for most of their lives together. Her daughter died in 1995, and her husband died in 2019. She died in 2023, at the age of 83, after she was struck by a truck outside her home in Montclair, New Jersey.
