= Annie Lee Moss =

American communications clerk (1905–1996)

- Annie Lee Moss and her attorney George E.C. Hayes (partially obscured) testifying before the McCarthy committee on March 12, 1954
- Born: Annie Lee Crawford; August 9, 1905; South Carolina, U.S.
- Died: January 1, 1996 (aged 90); Washington, D.C., U.S.
- Occupations: Communications clerk US Army Signal Corps
- Known for: Involvement in the McCarthy hearings

Annie Lee Moss (née Crawford; August 9, 1905 – January 15, 1996) was a communications clerk in the US Army Signal Corps in the Pentagon and alleged member of the American Communist Party. She was believed to be a security risk by the FBI and her superiors at the Signal Corps, and was questioned by United States Senator Joseph McCarthy in his role as the chairman of the Senate Permanent Subcommittee on Investigations. The highly publicized case was damaging to McCarthy's popularity and influence.

== Early years ==
She was born as Annie Lee Crawford in 1905 in South Carolina. She had six siblings, and her father was a tenant farmer. Her family moved to North Carolina, where she left high school to work as a domestic servant and a laundress. She married Ernest Moss in 1926, and they moved to Durham, North Carolina, where she worked in the tobacco industry.

== Career ==
Moss began her career in the federal government as a dessert cook in government cafeterias. In 1945, she moved to a job as a clerk in the General Accounting Office and in 1949 secured a civil-service position as an Army Signal Corps communications clerk at the Pentagon. A widowed mother, Moss had steadily improved her position since moving to Washington, DC, in the early 1940s. She bought a home in 1950, and by 1954 had an annual income of $3,300 (about $40,000 today) a year, well above the median for black women at the time.

In accordance with a loyalty review program introduced by President Harry S. Truman in 1947, Moss was investigated by the loyalty board of the General Accounting Office in October 1949. The next year, when Moss was promoted to communications clerk at the Pentagon, she was reinvestigated by the Army's Loyalty-Security Screening Board. The result of this investigation was that Moss was suspended from her position with the recommendation that she be discharged. She appealed this decision and was cleared by the Army board in January 1951.

== Charges, appearance before McCarthy ==
In September 1951, the FBI notified the General Accounting Office of evidence Moss had been a member of the Communist Party in the mid-1940s, but at that time the army did not reopen the case. This evidence came from Mary Stalcup Markward, who, working as an informant for the FBI, had joined the Communist Party from 1943 to 1949. Markward held such positions as membership director and treasurer for the party. She reported regularly to the FBI, gave them copies of party documents, membership lists, and detailed accounts of meetings and activities. In February 1954, Markward testified before the House Un-American Activities Committee. Although she could not identify Moss personally, she testified that she had seen Annie Lee Moss's name and address on the Communist Party's membership rolls in 1944.

At this point, Moss came to Senator Joseph McCarthy's attention. McCarthy, in his capacity as chairman of the Permanent Subcommittee on Investigations, was looking into charges of Communist infiltration of the army, specifically at the Army Signal Corps laboratories at Fort Monmouth.

Moss and her attorney, George E.C. Hayes, appeared before McCarthy's committee on March 11, 1954, at a session open to the public. McCarthy had made headlines with the case, claiming that Moss was "handling the encoding and decoding of confidential and top-secret messages". This was incorrect, as the Army pointed out: Moss handled only unreadable, encrypted messages, and had no access to the Pentagon code room.

McCarthy left the hearing room shortly after Moss's testimony began, leaving his chief counsel Roy Cohn to handle the rest of the questioning. Moss was a small, soft-spoken, and seemingly timid woman who appeared to be a far cry from the intellectuals and political activists who were usually the target of McCarthy's investigations. She stated that she rarely read newspapers and had not even heard of Communism until 1948. She had difficulty with multisyllable words when asked to read a document before the committee, and responded "Who's that?" when asked if she knew who Karl Marx was, evoking laughter from the audience. She denied the charges, saying, "Never at any time have I been a member of the Communist Party and I have never seen a Communist Party card", and "I didn't subscribe to the Daily Worker and I wouldn't pay for it".

Cohn's examination of Moss quickly ran into difficulty. After he noted that a "Communist activist" named Rob Hall was known to have visited Moss's home, it was pointed out (by Robert F. Kennedy, then the minority counsel for the committee) that two Rob Halls were in Washington: one was a known Communist who was white, and the other was a union organizer who was African American. Moss said that the Rob Hall she knew was "a man of about my complexion". As the hearing proceeded, it became clear that both the senators and the spectators were favoring Moss over Cohn and McCarthy. When Cohn asserted that he had corroboration of Markward's testimony from a confidential source, Senator John McClellan rebuked him for alluding to evidence he was not actually presenting. Chairman Karl Mundt ruled that Cohn's comments be stricken from the record. McClellan responded:

You can't strike these statements made by counsel here as to evidence that we're having and withholding. You cannot strike that from the press nor from the public mind once it's planted there. That's the – that is the – evil of it. I don't think it's fair to a witness, to a citizen of this country, to bring them up here and cross-examine them, then when they get through, say 'we've got something, the FBI's got something on you that condemns you.' It is not sworn testimony. It is convicting people by rumor and hearsay and innuendo.

As had happened several times already, loud applause erupted from the spectators.

Senator Stuart Symington then suggested that, as with Rob Hall, the case against Moss might be a matter of mistaken identity. Moss immediately agreed, saying three women named Annie Lee Moss were in Washington, DC. Symington said, "I may be sticking my neck out and I may be wrong, but I've been listening to you testify this afternoon and I think you're telling the truth." Again there was loud and prolonged applause.

=== See It Now and other coverage ===
A cameraman from Edward R. Murrow's television show See It Now had filmed the Moss hearing, and the case was the subject of the episode broadcast on March 16, 1954. The previous week's show had been Murrow's famous "A Report on Senator Joseph R. McCarthy" broadcast, which was deeply critical of McCarthy (and the subject of the 2005 film Good Night, and Good Luck). Murrow opened the Annie Lee Moss show saying it would present a "little picture about a little woman", and closed it with a sound recording of a speech by Dwight D. Eisenhower in which the President praised the right of Americans to "meet your accuser face to face". The public's response to both shows was highly favorable, and because of them Murrow is widely credited with contributing to the eventual downfall of McCarthy. Support for Moss and criticism of McCarthy was widespread. In one of the more famous quotations from the McCarthy era, John Crosby wrote in the New York Herald Tribune, "The American People fought a revolution to defend, among other things, the right of Annie Lee Moss to earn a living, and Senator McCarthy now decided she has no such right." Reporting on public opinion in McCarthy's home state, Drew Pearson wrote, "Wisconsin folks saw her as a nice old colored lady who wasn't harming anyone and they didn't like their senator picking on her".

== Aftermath of the hearing ==
McCarthy's popularity was declining at the time of the Moss hearing, and the publicity around the case accelerated the process. He would soon be embroiled in the Army–McCarthy hearings which also significantly eroded his standing with the public and in the Senate. In December 1954, McCarthy was censured by the Senate, and spent the rest of his career in relative obscurity. He died on May 2, 1957. Soon after, Moss told The New York Times that she was sorry to hear of McCarthy's death, and felt no animosity towards him.

Moss had been suspended from her position when McCarthy announced his interest in the case. In January 1955, she was rehired to a non-sensitive position in the army's finance and accounts office. She remained an army clerk until her retirement in 1975. She died in 1996, aged 90.

== Later evidence against Moss ==
Since Markward's information included an address for Annie Lee Moss, and Moss confirmed this address in her testimony, the possibility of mistaken identity was never a very realistic one. In 1958, the Subversive Activities Control Board investigated a related case and confirmed Markward's testimony that Moss's name and address had appeared on the Communist party rolls in the mid-1940s. Several sources have reported this as proving that Moss was a Communist. More substantive is the evidence contained in Moss's FBI file, some of which was not revealed until the file was released through a Freedom of Information Act request. Andrea Friedman describes this evidence as "perhaps a dozen pieces of paper – included a list of 'party recruits' that identified Moss by name, race, age, and occupation; membership lists from two Communist party branches, the Communist Political Association, and various ad hoc committees containing Moss's name and address, as well as the number of her Communist Party membership book; and receipt records from 1945 for Daily Worker subscriptions". Friedman concludes that Moss most likely had indirect contact with Communists through her cafeteria workers' union, and at most was probably a "casual recruit to the Communist Party, attracted by its social and economic justice politics", and later abandoned any associations with them.

== See also ==
- McCarthyism
- Milo Radulovich
