= Harold Buchman =

American screenwriter and attorney (1912–1990)

- Born: June 24, 1912; Brainerd, Minnesota, U.S.
- Died: June 22, 1990 (aged 77); Cannes, Provence-Alpes-Côte d'Azur, France
- Other name: Derek Frye
- Occupations: Lawyer, screenwriter

Harold Buchman (June 24, 1912 – June 22, 1990) was an American attorney and screenwriter. He was a target of the Hollywood blacklist during the 1950s and 60s.

== Career ==
=== Hollywood blacklist ===
His name appeared in the earliest Hollywood blacklist: a list of Communist sympathizers along with Dalton Trumbo, Maurice Rapf, Lester Cole, Howard Koch, John Wexley, Ring Lardner Jr., Harold Salemson, Henry Meyers, Theodore Strauss, and John Howard Lawson.

On April 17, 1947, Buchman, actress Anne Revere, and writer Sam Moore pled the Fifth Amendment regarding questions about Communist affiliation.

=== Progressive Party ===
Buchman was described as "the most important communist member" of the Progressive Citizens of America.

In January 1948, Buchman announced the Wallace for President Committee. In February 1948, he became new executive secretary and Maryland state director of the Progressive Party. In Summer 1948, when the Maryland attorney general rejected all filings by Progressive candidates for failure to sign loyalty oaths, Buchman announced he would file a suit.

=== Communist counsel ===
In June-July 1951, Buchman counseled the follow out of more than 40 people subpoena-ed by HUAC: Joseph Henderson and Philip Gran (June 21, 1951), Robert W. Lee (June 26, 1951), Irving Kandel (June 27, 1951), Sam Fox and Howard Bernard Silverberg (June 28, 1951), Louis Julius Shub (July 12, 1951), and Milton Seif and Irving Winker (July 13, 1951).

In March 1952, Buchman defended: Maurice Braverman, George Meyers, Roy Wood, Dorothy Rose Blumberg (wife of Albert Blumberg), Philip Frankfeld, and Regina Frankfeld (all members of the Communist Party branch of Maryland and the District of Columbia).

In 1952, Royal Wilbur France, civil liberties activist and president of the National Lawyers Guild, consulted NLG members Joseph Forer and Buchman.

=== Catonsville Nine ===
In 1968, Buchman served on the defense council of the Catonsville Nine. Defendants included Jesuit peace advocate Daniel Berrigan.

=== Black Panthers ===
In 1971, Buchman defended Arthur F. Turco Jr., a New York lawyer charged in connection with the 1969 torture and murder of a suspected Black Panthers police informer.

=== Later career ===
Buchman defended communist activist Madalyn Murray O'Hair

== Legacy ==
Barbara Mello, ACLU attorney and law teacher, served as law clerk for Buchman.

== See also ==
- Screen Writers Guild
- Hollywood blacklist
- Henry A. Wallace
- Progressive Party (United States, 1948)
- CPUSA
- Maurice Braverman

== External link ==
- Harold Buchman at IMDb
- Jewish Museum of Maryland
