= Andrea Friedman =

Andrea Friedman may refer to:

- Andrea Fay Friedman, American actress
- Andrea Friedman (historian) American historian
