= Mary Stalcup Markward =

- Born: Mary R. Stalcup; February 10, 1922; Fairfax County, Virginia, US
- Died: November 23, 1972 (aged 50); Silver Spring, Maryland, US
- Resting place: Baltimore National Cemetery
- Occupations: Beauty shop and FBI Informant
- Known for: FBI informant
- Spouse: George A. Markward

Mary R. Stalcup Markward (February 10, 1922 – November 23, 1972) was for seven years a member of the Washington, DC "District Communist Party" as director of the party's membership. She was actually working undercover for the FBI.

== Background ==
She was born as Mary R. Stalcup to Maria and Benjamin Stalcup on February 10, 1922. Benjamin Stalcup worked as a government bookbinder. Mary lived in Fairfax County, Virginia, and was recruited by the FBI in 1943, just a week after her wedding. Her husband, George A. Markward (1912–1969), had been sent to Europe to fight in World War II.

== Career ==
Markward was working in a beauty shop on Massachusetts Avenue. She may have been approached to spy because several of her clients were thought to be Communists by the FBI. Her daughter believed that her mother's essay written about her pride in being an American brought her to the attention of the FBI. The essay was published in a local Virginia paper. Markward worked undercover for almost seven years, a time that was stressful for her because she was shunned by friends and family because of her activities with the Party.

After consulting earlier in the year with HUAC, the Party heard and expelled her in February 1951.

Markward testified before the House Committee on Un-American Activities on July 11, 1951, that Annie Lee Moss, Maurice Braverman, and about 240 other people were Communist Party members. She provided the names of their spouses and gave the exact dates of party meetings. While her memory of membership and Party activities was largely accurate, Markward did not provide evidence that the Communist Party had any strength in the DC area. At one point in her testimony, she even joked about the Party's inability to recruit young, new members. In the list of members she did provide, there appeared to be a connection between Party membership and civil rights activism; several people whom Markward accused were less involved with communism and more concerned with picketing segregated areas of the city.

HUAC also questioned her in a manner to discredit the all-but-defeated Progressive Party from the 1948 election:

Mr. Velde: As to the Communist Party connection with the Progressive Party, could you describe that briefly?
Mrs. Markward: The Progressive Party?
Mr. Velde: Yes. Was the Progressive Party infiltrated by the Communist Party after it was organized, or was the Communist Party responsible for the beginning of the Progressive Party organization?
Mrs. Markward: I don't believe the Progressive Party could have been organized without the energy and activity of various Communists in Maryland and the District of Columbia. They decided it was a desirable organization, and put everything they had to see that it was organized. Several committees, known as political action committees, were set up on city and district levels, and the people on those committees were to see that the Progressive Party did function.
Mr. Velde: Did any of the funds of the Communist Party go into the campaign of the Progressive Party?
Mrs. Markward: I don't know one way or another.
Mr. Velde: In Maryland?

Mrs. Markward: I don't know.

Her accusation of Annie Lee Moss is the most remembered; Moss categorically denied membership or collusion with communists. Moss claimed that she was a victim of mistaken identity; that she was not the only person in Washington named Annie Lee Moss, and the communist Markward identified was a different Annie Lee Moss. However, files declassified years later confirmed Markward's identification as accurate.

== Later life ==
Mary Stalcup Markward contracted multiple sclerosis early in her life, which caused her to retire from the FBI. Later, FBI officials refused to acknowledge her, and retroactively taxed the income she received as an undercover agent. She died on November 23, 1972, in Silver Spring, Maryland, at age 50. She was buried in Baltimore National Cemetery.

== People named by Markward ==
On the stand on July 11, 1951, Markward would name or confirm names mentioned by HUAC, as follows:

Mr. Tavenner: Will you give us the names of those who served with you from time to time as members of the district board?

Mrs. Markward: Al Lannon was the chairman while he was here. He was replaced by Phil Frankfeld ...

- Elizabeth Searle ...
- Dorothy Strange ...
- William Johnson ...
- William S. Johnson, from Washington ...
- Henry Thomas ...
- Elsie Smith ...
- Sam Gordon ...
- Dorothy Rose Blumberg ...
- Albert Blumberg was a member after he got active in the district, but he was assigned to a national activity and did not participate on a local level so much.
- Maurice Braverman often attended the meetings of the board, particularly during election campaigns. He was particularly active with the political-action committee of the organization.
- Roy Wood was a member of the district board ...
- Pete Forrest ...
- Isidore Schwartz ... was a delegate to the national convention in 1944, either a delegate or an alternate.
- Florence Schwartz ...
- Levy Williamson ... attended meetings of the district committee ...
- Robert W. Lee ...
- Irving Winkler ...
- Sally Winkler ...
- Herbert J. Nichol ... also called Herb Silver ...
- Irving Kandel ... attended district committee meetings ...
- Sam Fox ...
- Ruth Fox ... employed by the United Electrical, Radio and Machine Workers of America?
- Louis Pearlman ... running a grocery store in Wahshington ...
- Chase Isaacs ... also known as "Mama" Isaacs ...
- Julia Kotelchuck ... elected to the district committee in 1945 ...
- Lou Gilbert ... leadership nomination committee ... functionary in the Furniture Workers Union in Baltimore
- Herb Kransdorf ...
- Jack Zucker ... international organizer in Baltimore of the United Electrical, Radio and Machine Workers of America
- Anne Zucker ...
- Esvand Jones ...
- Mary Roberts ...
- Eve Lannon
- Jean Frankfeld

She also named Sheppard Carl Thierman and Annie Lee Moss.
