= Communist Party of Maryland =

- Founded: 1919
- Headquarters: P.O. BOX : 39463 Baltimore, MD 21212
- Ideology: Communism; Marxism–Leninism; Trade unionism
- National affiliation: Communist Party USA

The Communist Party of Maryland is the regional party of the Communist Party USA in the state of Maryland. Maryland's Communist Party was founded in 1919, the same year as the national party was founded, and is still in operation with its headquarters in Downtown Baltimore.

== History ==
Gubernatorial candidates
Candidate	Year	Number
Samuel Parker	1930	855 (0.17%)
Bernard Ades	1934	776 (0.15%)
Samuel Gordon	1938	616 (0.11%)

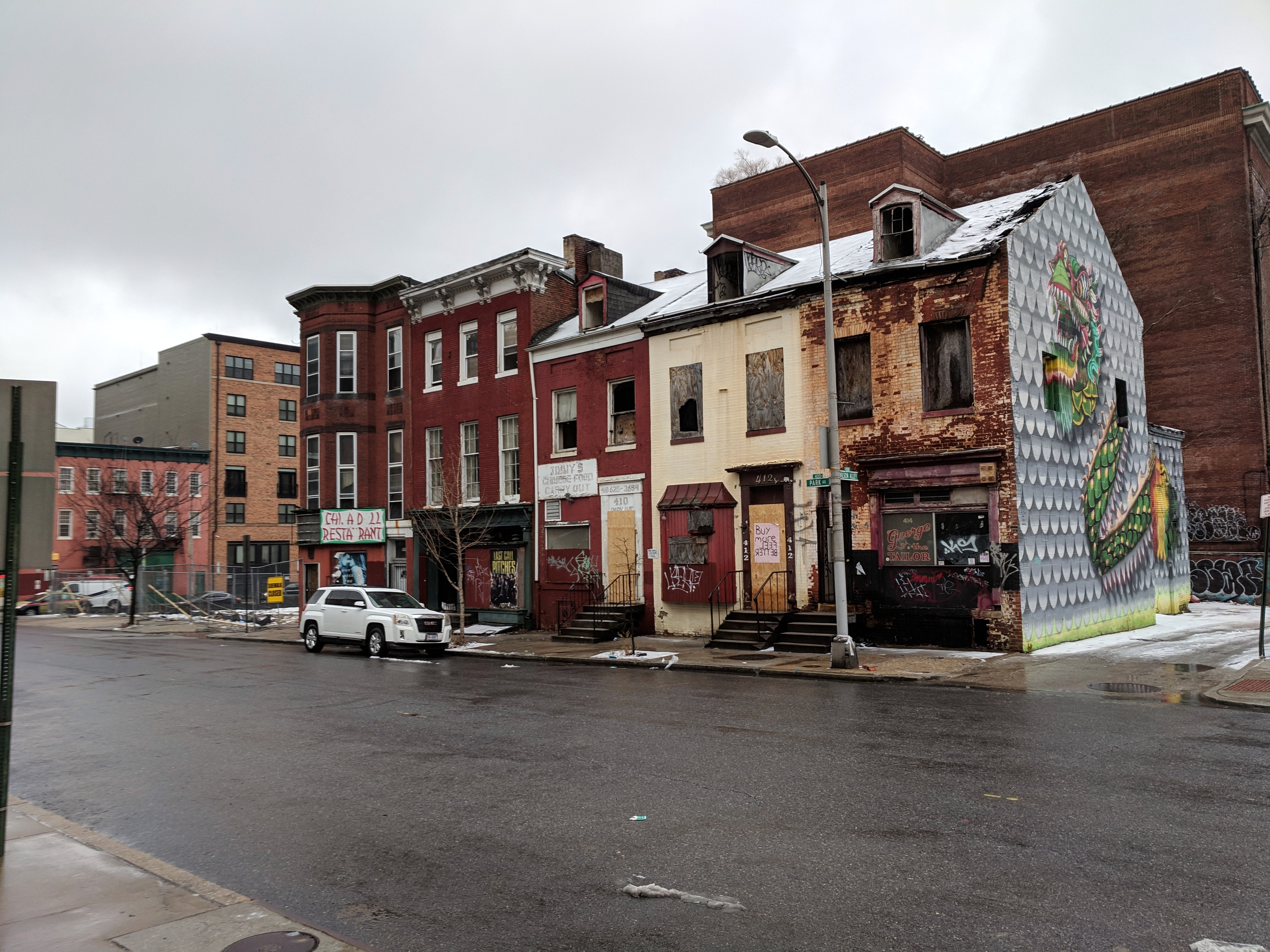
408 Park Avenue in Baltimore's Chinatown, February 2019. The building on the right with the Chinese dragon artwork was once the headquarters of the Communist Party of Maryland.

During the 1920s, Lithuanian Hall in the Hollins Market neighborhood was used as a venue for speeches by prominent members of the Communist Party USA, such as William Z. Foster and Juliet Stuart Poyntz. On October 13, 1929, a Jewish branch of the CPUSA hosted a speech by Sol Hurwitz, the editor of the Jewish Daily Forward, and the speech was interrupted by a mob of anti-Communists. The Communists inside of the hall defended themselves with chairs until the police arrived to disperse the mob.

A number of Russians in Baltimore were involved in the party during the 1920s. The Communist Party in Baltimore had a Russian branch. With the approval of the national Russian-language organization of the Communist Party USA, members of Baltimore's Russian Communist branch often attended the Independent Russian Orthodox Church in Baltimore. Prokope Suvorov, the leader of the Russian Communist branch, taught the Russian language at the church. Another Russian Communist staged the congregation's plays, while other members sold Communist literature at the church. The Russian-American Communist Alex Bail was concerned by the religiosity of Baltimore's Russian Christian Communists, but his concerns were somewhat abated due to the portrait of Vladimir Lenin hanging inside the Russian Orthodox church.

Samuel Parker, an unemployed African-American longshoreman, was the Communist candidate for governor in 1930. Parker had been involved in politics for many years, but was inspired to run for governor after becoming disillusioned with the two major parties after the defeat of Al Smith in the 1928 presidential election. His campaign focused on bread-and-butter issues, particularly the elimination of unemployment. Receiving only 616 votes, he was overwhelmingly outvoted by supporters of Albert Ritchie. As Maryland state law dictates that candidates for governor must be at least 30 years of age, the 26 year old Parker would not have been legally allowed to become governor even if he had won the popular vote.

In 1934, the lawyer Bernard Ades ran for Governor of Maryland on the Communist Party ticket and received less than 8,000 votes. Despite the support of the African American community, he lost by a significant margin.

From 1937 until the 1940s, the CP of Maryland ran a communist bookstore called the Free State Bookshop. Alexander Munsell and his wife Louise Ellen Munsell ran the bookstore adjacent to the Communist Party headquarters in downtown Baltimore. The Free State Bookshop and another communist bookstore, the Frederick Douglass Bookshop, were monitored by FBI agents and informants. The Frederick Douglass Bookshop was described by the FBI as a “Communist Party literature distribution point in the Negro section of [West] Baltimore.” For a decade these two communist bookstores served as central meeting places for the Baltimore's Communist Party, hosting meetings for party officials and new members.

During his time at the Baltimore School for the Arts in the late 1980s, the rapper Tupac Shakur was affiliated with the Baltimore branch of the Young Communist League USA. The Baltimore Young Communist League is now also known as the Tupac Shakur Club in his honor. He began dating the daughter of the director of the Communist Party of Maryland.

In 1991, the Baltimore Sun ran an article that assessed the state of the Communist Party of Maryland at that time:

Baltimore's Communist Party traces it origins to a strike against the B&O Railroad in 1877...
In the 1930s, Baltimore was designated by national party leaders as District 4 and was made up of about 20 "cells"...
The party focused its recruiting on companies with many blue-collar workers... Often, national leaders such as Earl Browder and William Z. Foster were guest speakers. The party held rallies... and fielded candidates in local elections...
After World War II... most of Baltimore's communists went underground. They maintained low-profile headquarters, successively, on Eutaw Street, Franklin Street and in the 200 block Liberty Street...
The communist witch hunts of the late 1940s and early '50s were not among the city's shining hours. In 1949, complying with laws requiring loyalty oaths and federal acts that effectively outlawed the party, city, state and federal authorities began to arrest known communists and to sentence them to jail, often for minor or fabricated crimes. Among those who served time were Maurice Braverman, the party's lawyer; Leroy H. Wood, its treasurer and George A. Meyers, a long-time local and national party leader. In 1952, Meyers spent 30 days in jail for refusing to name others in the party. One Evening Sun headline of the time: "FBI Informer Calls Meyers Key State Red."
What was left of the membership lacked the resources to carry on. Postwar prosperity and ideological differences with Soviet communism proved too much for Baltimore's communists, and the local party all but disappeared...1970s, and winning restatement in Maryland (1974) and federal courts (1975).

(Note that the Sun calls Braverman a Party lawyer.)

== Organizing ==
The Communist Party of Maryland maintains the Baltimore Young Communist League (Tupac Shakur Club), the local Baltimore affiliate of the Young Communist League USA.

In 2019, the Communist Party of Maryland held a celebration in 2019 to mark the 100th anniversary of the foundation of the CPUSA.

== Members ==
- Bernard Ades, a lawyer who fought for the rights of African Americans and ran for Governor of Maryland on the Communist Party ticket.
- Albert Blumberg, a philosopher and political activist who was an official of the Communist Party for several years before joining the Democratic Party as a district leader.
- Maurice Braverman, a civil rights lawyer and Party lawyer who was convicted in 1952 under the Smith Act, served 28 of 36 months, then immediately faced disbarment, against which he fought in the 1970s and won reinstatement in Maryland (1974) and federal courts (1975).
- Harold Buchman, an attorney who was also a member of Progressive Citizens of America (founded by former vice president Henry A. Wallace) who was blacklisted by Hollywood and served as the state director of the Maryland Progressive Party.
- Tupac Shakur, a rapper, writer, and actor who is widely considered to be one of the most influential rappers of all time.

== See also ==
- Communist Party USA and African Americans

== Bibliography ==
- Browder, Earl * Browder Hits Anti-Soviet Plot speech of Earl Browder, at Aperion Manor, Brooklyn, NY, April 1, 1943. Baltimore? : Communist Party and Young Communist League of Baltimore?, 1943.
- Committee to Defeat the Smith Act. The Baltimore Smith Act Case: A Constitutional Crossroad, Baltimore, [1952?]
- Meyers, George A. An Indictment of the Baltimore City Jail, Communist Party of Maryland and Washington, D.C., [195-?]
- Pedersen, Vernon L. The Communist Party in Maryland, 1919-57, University of Illinois Press, 2001.
- Skotnes, Adnor. A New Deal for All?: Race and Class Struggles in Depression-era Baltimore, Duke University Press, 2013.
