= Maurice Braverman =

American lawyer (1916–2002)

- Born: Maurice Louis Braverman; February 1, 1916; Washington, D.C., US
- Died: March 25, 2002 (aged 86); Elkton, Maryland, US
- Other name: Maurice L. Braverman
- Education: City College of New York; Baltimore School of Law
- Occupation: Civic rights lawyer
- Years active: 1939–1985
- Organization: NLG
- Known for: Conviction under Smith Act, disbarment and reinstatement
- Political party: Communist Party of the United States of America
- Spouse(s): Jeanette Block (divorced), Myrna Lapides
- Children: 2 daughters

Maurice Braverman (1916–2002) was a 20th-century American civil rights lawyer and some-time Communist Party member (and Party lawyer) who was convicted in 1952 under the Smith Act, served 28 of 36 months, then immediately faced disbarment, against which he fought in the 1970s and won reinstatement in Maryland (1974) and federal courts (1975).

== Background ==
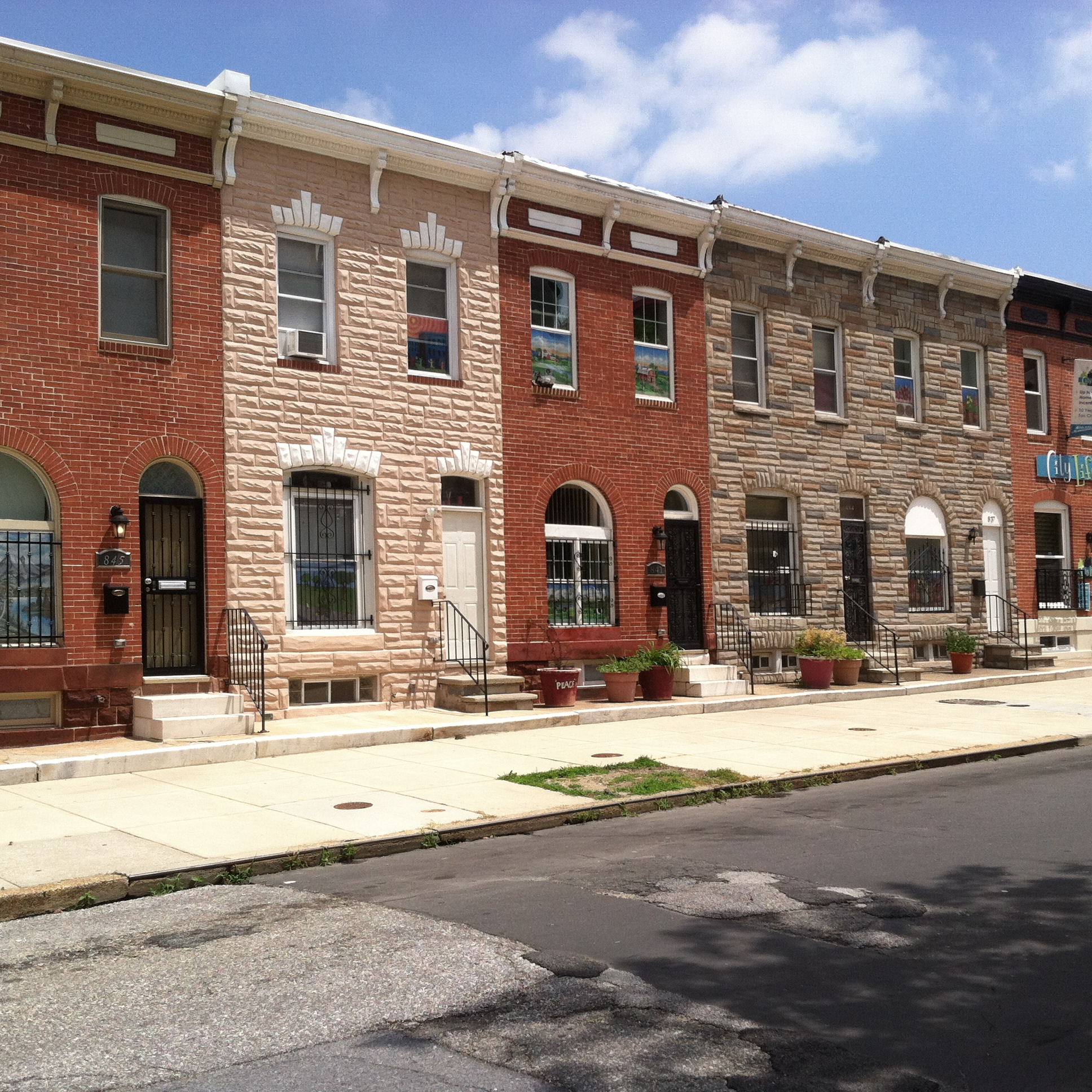
East Baltimore area, where Braverman opened a grocery store

Maurice Louis Braverman was born to a Jewish family in Washington, DC, on February 1, 1916. His family moved to Baltimore, Maryland, when he was five years old. They lived above their family's grocery store on Jackson Street in South Baltimore.

In 1933, he received a BA from City College of New York (CCNY). He opened a grocery store in East Baltimore. In 1938, he started law school at the Baltimore School of Law; he drove taxi cabs to help pay tuition. In 1941, he received his law degree. (During law school, study of the Sacco & Vanzetti case aroused "civil libertarian feelings.")

A 1935 map of Baltimore City records Maurice L. Braverman as a resident of "3817 Lewin Ave., Baltimore, MD District 5, Ward 28." A 1940 census shows Maurice Braverman, 31, white male American, residing in Brooklyn Assembly District 2. In 1948, his law office was at 15 South Gay Street in Baltimore.

== Career ==
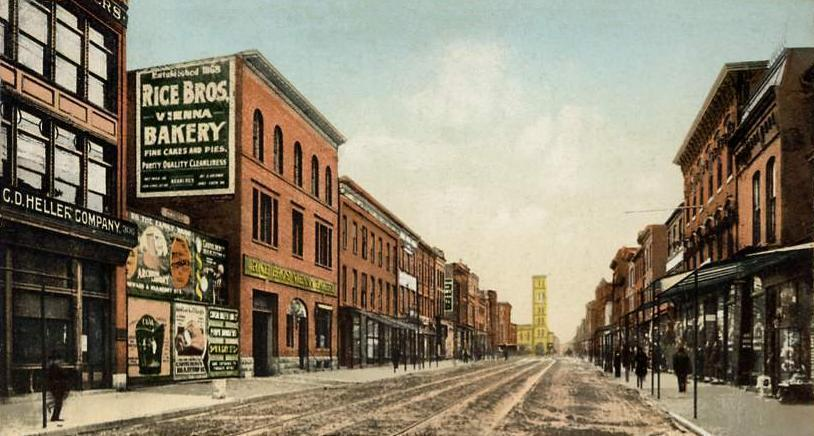
Gay Street (1912), where Braverman had his law office

Braverman was in civil service in several positions from 1939 to 1940. He worked in a post office in Baltimore for a few months. He worked in the U.S. War Department for a few months, and worked in the Bureau of Internal Revenue.

On October 7, 1941, Braverman passed the Maryland Bar and opened on his own office in Baltimore, where he would practice law for the next eleven years.

In 1943, he joined the Communist Party due to his anti-fascism and the fact that the USSR was by that time a member of the Allied Forces in World War II. He also stated that the Party provided education. "For the first time, I read history... The Party was a vehicle of great intellectual growth for me, a very rich part of my life."

In the 1940s, Braverman joined Max Angelson, Harry Angelson, and Ida Sperling as plaintiffs-appellants against the New York Rapid Transit Corporation.

=== Hiss Case ===
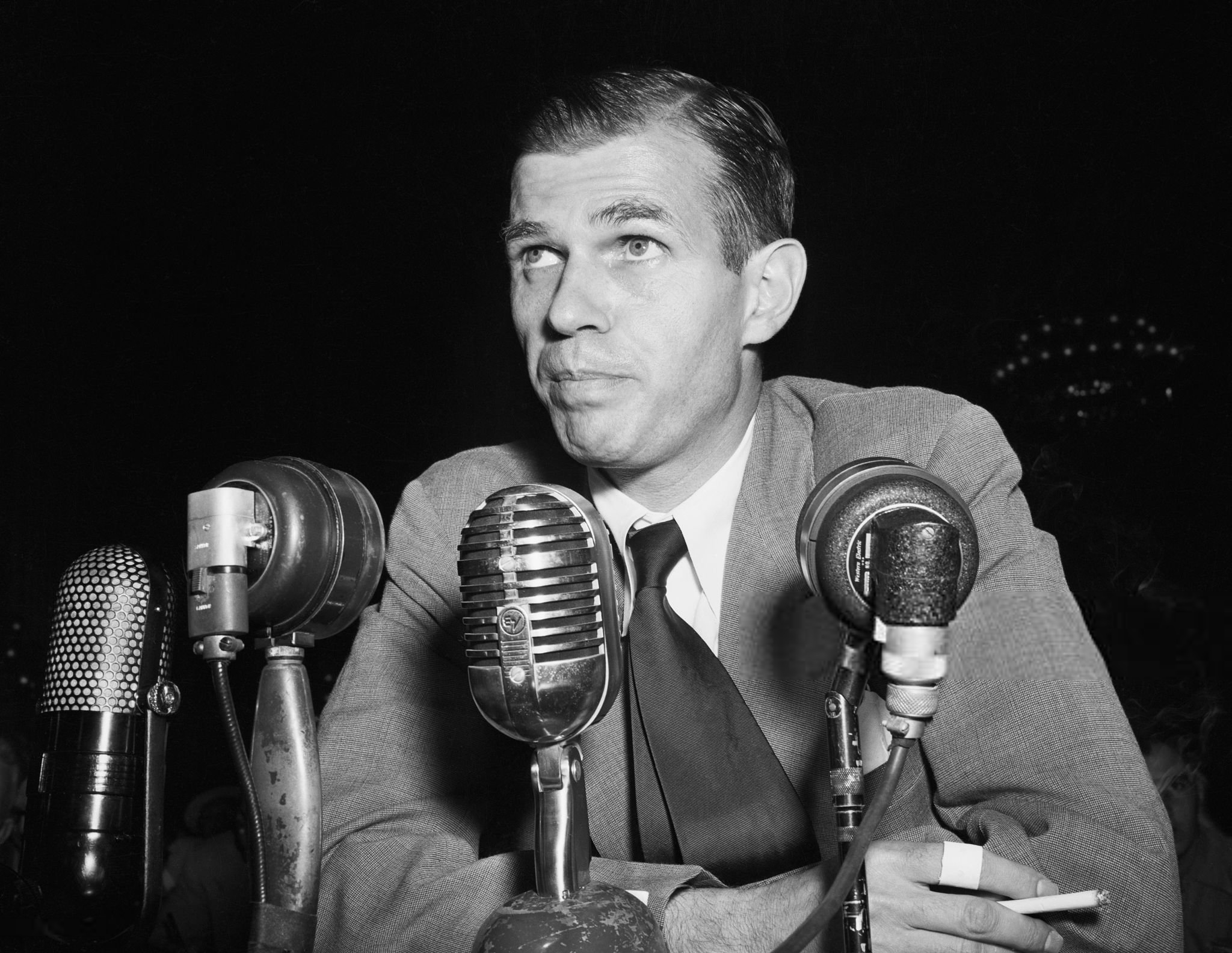
Alger Hiss (1948)

On August 26, 1948, Braverman appeared as counsel for Mr. and Mrs. William Rosen, involved in the sale of a Ford automobile once belonging to Alger Hiss during House Un-American Activities Committee (HUAC) hearings that were following the allegations of Elizabeth Bentley and Whittaker Chambers.

After a short time, the committee attempted to turn Braverman from counsel to witness:

Mr. Braverman: I am not on the stand.

Mr. Stripling: You are on the stand. In fact, I would suggest that the chairman swear counsel. I have a few questions I would like to ask counsel.
Mr. McDowell: Stand up and raise your right hand.
Mr. Braverman: I will stand up, but I refuse to be sworn in as a witness in this case. I am counsel.
Mr. McDowell: Get a subpoena.
Mr. Braverman: Mr. McDowell, will you permit me to call counsel?
Mr. McDowell: Well, no : there has been no action taken yet. Wait a minute.
Mr. Braverman: I would like to call counsel before I am subpoenaed.
Mr. McDowell: There has been no subpoena yet. Just wait a minute until you need counsel.
(...)
Mr. Stripling: You asked to call counsel. Are you prepared to testify if we subpoena you?
Mr. Braverman: I am not prepared.
Mr. Stripling: You are not prepared?
Mr. Braverman: I would like to state my reason, too.
Mr. Stripling: I can see, Mr. Chairman, that the witness would not testify and I suggest that we withhold the subpoena
. Mr. Braverman: I would like the opportunity of stating my reason, Mr. Stripling.
Mr. Stripling: For refusing to take the oath?
Mr. Braverman: Yes; when it was asked of me.
Mr. Stripling: I ask you now : Will you take the oath?
Mr. Braverman: No, I won't.
Mr. Stripling: Why?
Mr. Braverman: For the simple reason that I am here representing Mr. Rosen. I think any attempt to put me under oath is an attempt to intimidate my client and hurt my professional relations between attorney and client. I have a perfect right to appear as attorney for my client, and I think the committee has no right to ask questions regarding relations between me and my client.
Mr. Stripling: We are not asking you about the relations between your client and yourself.
Mr. Braverman: I think any questions would be in that regard.
Mr. Stripling: We often swear counsel. In fact, we swore counsel yesterday in public hearing, and because you come here with a witness and seek to give him advice on how to answer questions doesn't give you any immunity.
Mr. Braverman: I haven't claimed that immunity. I am merely stating my position.

Mr. Stripling: You have refused.

On September 8, 1948, Braverman appeared again before HUAC as counsel to Addie Rosen (Mrs. William Rosen). When Mrs. Rosen continued to refuse to answer questions by pleading the Fifth Amendment, the committee again turned on Braverman:

The Chairman: Mr. Counsel, will you stand and be sworn? Please stand and be sworn, because we want to ask some questions about this matter and it is very important and we want sworn testimony.

Mr. Braverman: Mr. Thomas, I will state as I stated before, that I am not here as a witness. I am here as counsel.
The Chairman: From now on you are here as a witness.
Mr. Braverman: Before I appear as a witness I would like the privilege of consulting counsel and being represented by counsel before this committee.
The Chairman: Is your counsel present now?
Mr. Braverman: No.
The Chairman: Do you refuse to be sworn?
Mr. Braverman: I refuse to be sworn and appear as a witness until I have the right of counsel. I want counsel present to advise me.
The Chairman: I will have to insist that you be sworn now. Raise your right hand or I will hold you in contempt.
Mr. Braverman: I am sorry, I do not want to be in contempt of this committee, but if I am sworn as a witness I want the right to consult counsel.
The Chairman: We want to ask you two or three simple little questions and we think the testimony should be sworn testimony, so if you will just please oblige the committee by raising your right hand.
Mr. Braverman: If this committee will allow me the right to have counsel present when I am here as a witness, I will be happy to be sworn as a witness.
Mr. Stripling: The witness has just given the committee a dissertation of his familiarity with the rights and privileges of witnesses. I don't think he needs counsel.
(...) Mr. Stripling: Are you going to appear with Mr. Rosen tomorrow ?
Mr. Braverman: I understood he was going to appear today.
Mr. Stripling: It will be tomorrow.
Mr. Braverman: I have been retained by Mr. Rosen.
Mr. Stripling: We will serve a subpena on you at the direction of the chairman to appear tomorrow. So bring counsel with you also.
(...)

Mr. Stripling: Mr. McDowell, here is what I think is the situation : We know that the Communist Party got in touch with Rosen before he appeared before this committee, and we know that the Communist Party sent his lawyer Braverman to accompany her. We also know that that signature which appears on this assignment of title is not that of William Rosen. We do know that William Rosen and his wife, Mrs. Rosen, are and have been members of the Communist Party.

On September 9, 1948, Braverman appeared again before HUAC, both as counsel to Rosen and as witness himself. After counseling Rosen, HUAC swore him in. Serving as his counsel were Joseph Forer (the best known pro-Communist lawyer in Washington and prominent member of the local chapter of the National Lawyers Guild) and Mitchell A. Dubow (future district judge in Minnesota).

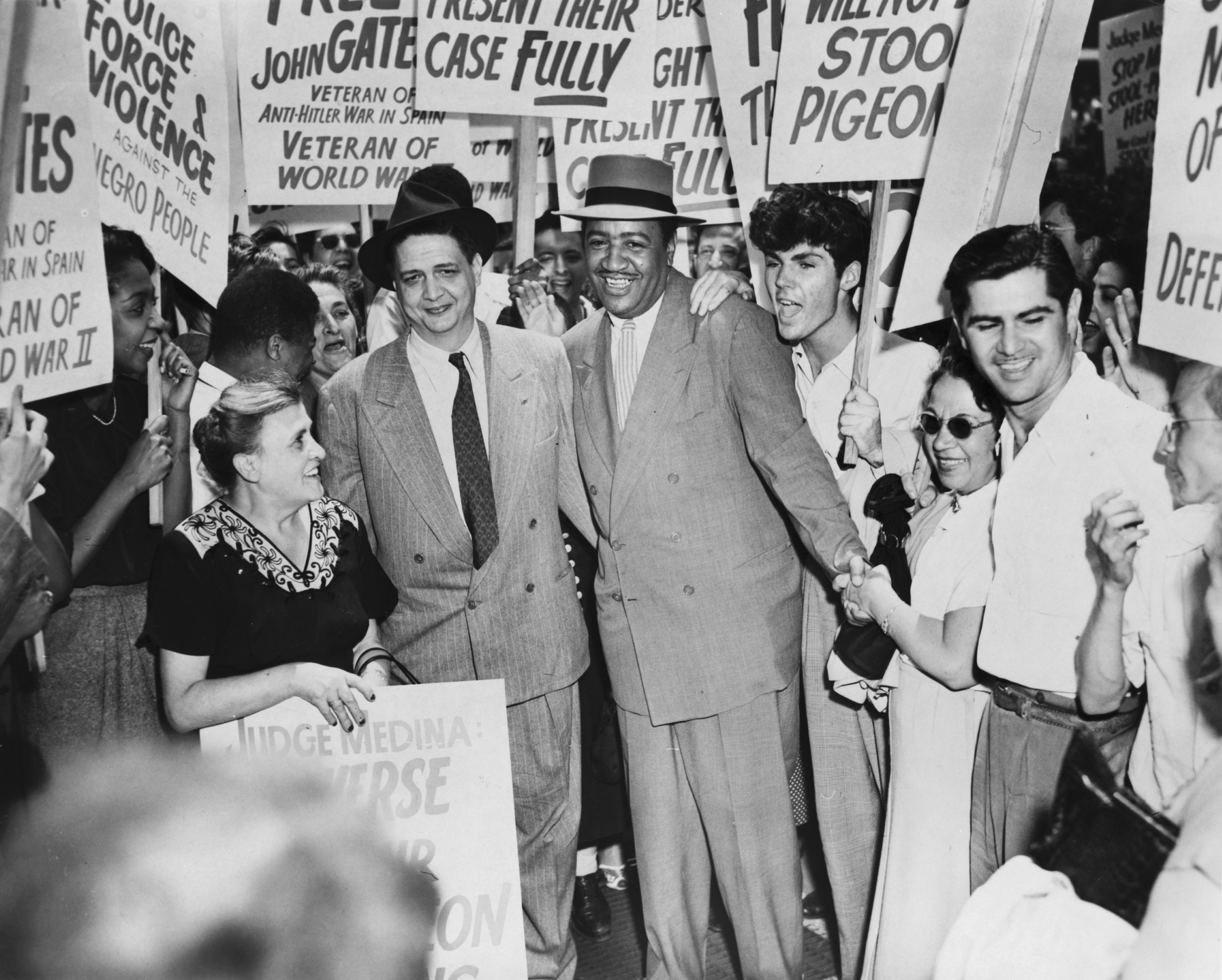
Smith Act trials of Communist Party leaders: Defendants Robert Thompson and Benjamin J. Davis—compared to whom Maurice Braverman was only "second string"

Once on the stand as witness and his background discussed, Braverman found himself accused of Communism:

Mr. Stripling: Are you a member of the Communist Party?

Mr. Braverman: Mr. Chairman, I want to state here that the only reason I am before this committee is because I came here representing a witness. The committee has not been satisfied with the way that witness appeared here, and has called me here to harass me, to intimidate me, to intimidate my clients.
Any questions that go into my private, personal, or political life go to the root of the attorney and client relationship. That is the only reason that I am here before this committee, and I say that this committee has no right to ask me that question.
(...)
Mr. Stripling: Are you a member of the Communist Party, Mr. Braverman?
Mr. Braverman: I repeat my answer, Mr. Stripling, and I refuse to state—I refuse to answer that question on the ground of the first amendment, which gives me the right of freedom of speech; freedom of assembly, and freedom of association; and the fifth amendment, the amendment providing for self-incrimination.
Mr. Stripling: Self-incrimination. Are you pleading self-incrimination?
Mr. Braverman: I will repeat my answer, Mr. Stripling.
Mr. Stripling: I want this straight. Are you pleading self-incrimination?
Mr. Braverman: I am pleading the fifth amendment to the Constitution.
(...)
Mr. Stripling: Did you know Albert E. Blumberg?
Mr. Braverman: Yes : I know Mr. Blumberg.
Mr. Stripling: How well do you know Mr. Blumberg?
Mr. Braverman: He is a client of mine.
Mr. Stripling: A client of yours? Have you ever represented the Communist Party?
Mr. Braverman: Yes, I have represented the Communist Party.
Mr. Stripling: How many times have you represented the Communist Party?
Mr. Braverman: I do not know. Offhand, I cannot say.
(...)
Mr. Stripling: Mr. Chairman, I have certain information here which I do not wish to introduce at this time. I want to introduce it in open session. I have no further questions.

I recommend that this witness also be cited for contempt of the committee.

(Albert E. Blumberg (1906 – October 8, 1997) of Baltimore was an American philosopher and political activist. He was an official of the Communist Party for several years before joining the Democratic Party as a district leader.)

In 1950, Braverman's name and address (15 South Gay Street, Baltimore) appeared in a HUAC investigative report, showing him as a member of the National Lawyers Guild.

=== Arrest, conviction, disbarment ===
In April 1951, the trial of Julius Rosenberg and Ethel Rosenberg ended in conviction and death sentence. In the wake of many anti-communist trials (in 1949 alone the Smith Act/Foley Square, Judith Coplon, and Alger Hiss trials), the Communist Party's National Committee ordered top leaders to make themselves "unavailable." These included Maryland leader Alfred Blumberg. During the summer of 1951, more than 40 people received subpoenas to appear before HUAC. Hearings ran June 19, 20, 21, 26, 27, 28, and July 11, 13, 1951. During the first six days of hearings, newspapers reported that witnesses balked answering questions.

On July 11, 1951, Mary Stalcup Markward, an FBI undercover agent in the Communist Party, testified. (After consulting earlier in the year with HUAC, the Party heard and expelled her in February 1951.) She named Braverman:

Mr. Tavenner: You mentioned the name of Maurice Braverman as an attorney for the Communist Party in Baltimore. Was he a member at any time of the executive committee of which you were a member?

Mrs. Markward: He was a member of the district committee. He was the lawyer who handled the business of the legacy for the Communist Party.
Mr. Tavenner: Mr. Braverman is also one of those who has appeared before this committee, I believe back in 1948, and refused to testify. Do you recall any of the circumstances about his appearance, that is, as to discussions about the position he would take when he appeared before this committee?
Mrs. Markward: I don't recall. I wasn't involved in that especially...

Maurice Braverman often attended the meetings of the board, particularly during election campaigns. He was particularly active with the political-action committee of the organization.

Braverman had already appeared as counsel to Herbert Kransdorf (June 19, 1951), Michael Howard (June 20, 1951), Peter Edward Forrest (June 26, 1951), and Eli Isadore Schwartz (June 28, 1951). Given opportunity to respond to Markward, Braverman's allegation, Braverman stated, ""I wouldn't have an answer to any stool pigeon." U.S. Representative Francis E. Walter, a HUAC member, retorted, "You may regard her as a stool pigeon, but I regard her as a great American." Three witnesses before the HUAC alleged that Braverman was a Communist Party member.

Later during that month, his wife later said, Braverman became aware that FBI agents were following him. Thanks to his experience as a taxi cab driver, he was able to elude them by car. On August 7, 1951, fearing imminent arrest, he went to New York to seek advice from an attorney. He recounted later, "He just laughed at me. 'They're arresting leaders. Are you a leader?' 'No.' 'Are you a member of the Politburo.' 'No.' 'Did they arrest 300 members?' 'No, they're just arresting leaders.' 'Then why will they arrest you?' Hearing of the arrest that day of George Meyers and DC branch head Roy Wood, he flew back to Baltimore: at 1:07 A.M. on August 8, 1951, upon arrival at Friendly Airport in Baltimore, Braverman was arrested and indicted. Philip Frankfeld and Dorothy Rose Blumberg were arrested in New York, Regina Frankfeld in Cleveland. As historian Vern Pederson has noted, "The six arrests were part of the Justice Department's Smith Act prosecution of local, 'second string' Party leaders from California, Pennsylvania, and Hawaii as well as Maryland." All six posted bail; FBI agents followed them around the clock, seven days a week–even sitting next to them in movies and calling them cabs home. Harold Buchman represented the six; United States Attorney for the District of Maryland Bernard J. Flynn prosecuted.

On April 1, 1952, Braverman and five other alleged Communists were convicted in the United States District Court for the District of Maryland for "conspiracy to teach and advocate and to organize the overthrow of the government by force or violence in violation of §2 of the Smith Act, 18 U.S.C.A. 2385." Prosecutor Flynn called out Braverman in particular as Communist official. Braverman received a fine of $1,000 and a sentence of imprisonment for three years. He served time in Lewisburg Penitentiary in the same area as Alger Hiss. Meanwhile, his family faced harassment from the FBI. They typically called his wife's place of work every few weeks for no apparent reason [implied: intimidation]. Braverman was released after 28 months and was released on May 19, 1955.

"As the result of a petition filed by the Bar Association of Baltimore City, Braverman was disbarred from the further practice of law by order of the Supreme Bench of Baltimore City dated June 28, 1955." Disbarment included both state and federal courts. To earn a living, he became a bookkeeper and accountant to small businesses. He left the Party. He joined other groups: the New Democratic Coalition, St. John's Council on Criminal Justice, and the Baltimore Free University.

=== Reinstatement ===
In the early 1970s, Braverman began a long legal battle to regain admission to the bar. He asked the Maryland chapter of the American Civil Liberties Union (ACLU) for help; they agreed. His lawyers included John C. Roemer III of the ACLU, and Stanley Mazeroff.

The ACLU's case for Braverman made national news on January 15, 1974, when filed. The case continued to attract national attention during that year. John F. King served as Braverman's counsel.

On October 1, 1973, the Court of Appeals of Maryland ordered referral of his petition for reinstatement to practice law in the state for an evidentiary hearing to a three-judge panel, which followed on October 15, 1973. The panel recommended reinstatement. On March 1, 1974, the Court of Appeals of Maryland, ordered Maurice L. Braverman reinstated as a member of the Bar of Maryland.

From 1974 to 1976, he continued to seek the right practice in federal court. In 1975, a panel of all of Baltimore's federal judges turned him down by a vote of 6–3. On April 9, 1976, C. Christopher Brown and Harold P. Dwin of Baltimore argued Braverman's case, with the National Lawyers Guild as amicus curiae (Doron Weinberg, Joseph Forer, and David Rein). On November 9, 1976, a federal appellate court in Richmond, Virginia, reversed that decision and he was free to practice in federal courts.

== Personal and death ==
Braverman married Jeanette Block, with whom he had two daughters (one died in 1991); they divorced. In 1981, he married Myrna Lapides (who also had a daughter from a previous marriage). In 1985, they moved to Israel. In 2000, they returned to Maryland and lived in Elkton. Braverman also had a granddaughter.

Braverman attributed his arrest and conviction to his calling FBI chief J. Edgar Hoover a "fag" on a tapped telephone line.

From at least 1953 through 1972, the U.S. Department of Justice's Office of the Attorney General noted the existence of a "Maurice Braverman Defense Committee." By 1972, the Government had concluded that "Pursuant to section 12(i) of Executive Order 10450 as amended by Executive Order No. 11605, issued July 2, 1971, 36 P.R. 12831, the Attorney General, by counsel, petitions this Board for a determination that the Maurice Braverman Defense Committee has ceased to exist... The last known address of the above-named organization was Box 2616, Arlington Station, Baltimore 15, MD".

In the 1970s, Braverman became associated with the East Bank Havurah.

Braverman died age 86 of pneumonia in Elkton, Maryland, on March 25, 2002. Myrna Lapides Braverman, a longtime philatelist, died on August 16, 2013.

(At present, there is no known relationship between Maurice Braverman and Harry Braverman (1920–1976), a Marxist economist based in New York City.)

== Legacy ==
=== Communist Party of Maryland ===
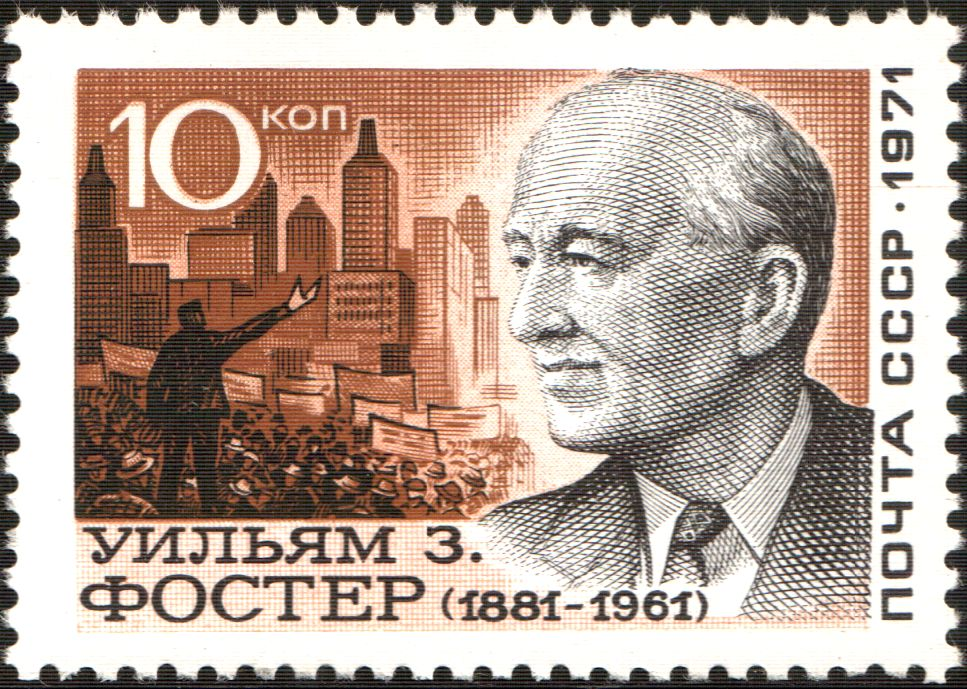
William Z. Foster (on stamp of USSR in 1971) spoke to the Party's Maryland chapter.

In 1991, the Baltimore Sun ran an article that assessed the state of the Communist Party of Maryland at that time:

Baltimore's Communist Party traces it origins to a strike against the B&O Railroad in 1877...
In the 1930s, Baltimore was designated by national party leaders as District 4 and was made up of about 20 "cells"...
The party focused its recruiting on companies with many blue-collar workers... Often, national leaders such as Earl Browder and William Z. Foster were guest speakers. The party held rallies... and fielded candidates in local elections...
After World War II... most of Baltimore's communists went underground. They maintained low-profile headquarters, successively, on Eutaw Street, Franklin Street and in the 200 block Liberty Street...
The communist witch hunts of the late 1940s and early '50s were not among the city's shining hours. In 1949, complying with laws requiring loyalty oaths and federal acts that effectively outlawed the party, city, state and federal authorities began to arrest known communists and to sentence them to jail, often for minor or fabricated crimes. Among those who served time were Maurice Braverman, the party's lawyer; Leroy H. Wood, its treasurer and George A. Meyers, a long-time local and national party leader. In 1952, Meyers spent 30 days in jail for refusing to name others in the party. One Evening Sun headline of the time: "FBI Informer Calls Meyers Key State Red."
What was left of the membership lacked the resources to carry on. Postwar prosperity and ideological differences with Soviet communism proved too much for Baltimore's communists, and the local party all but disappeared...1970s, and winning restatement in Maryland (1974) and federal courts (1975).

(Note that the Sun calls Braverman a Party lawyer.)

=== Hiss Case postscript ===
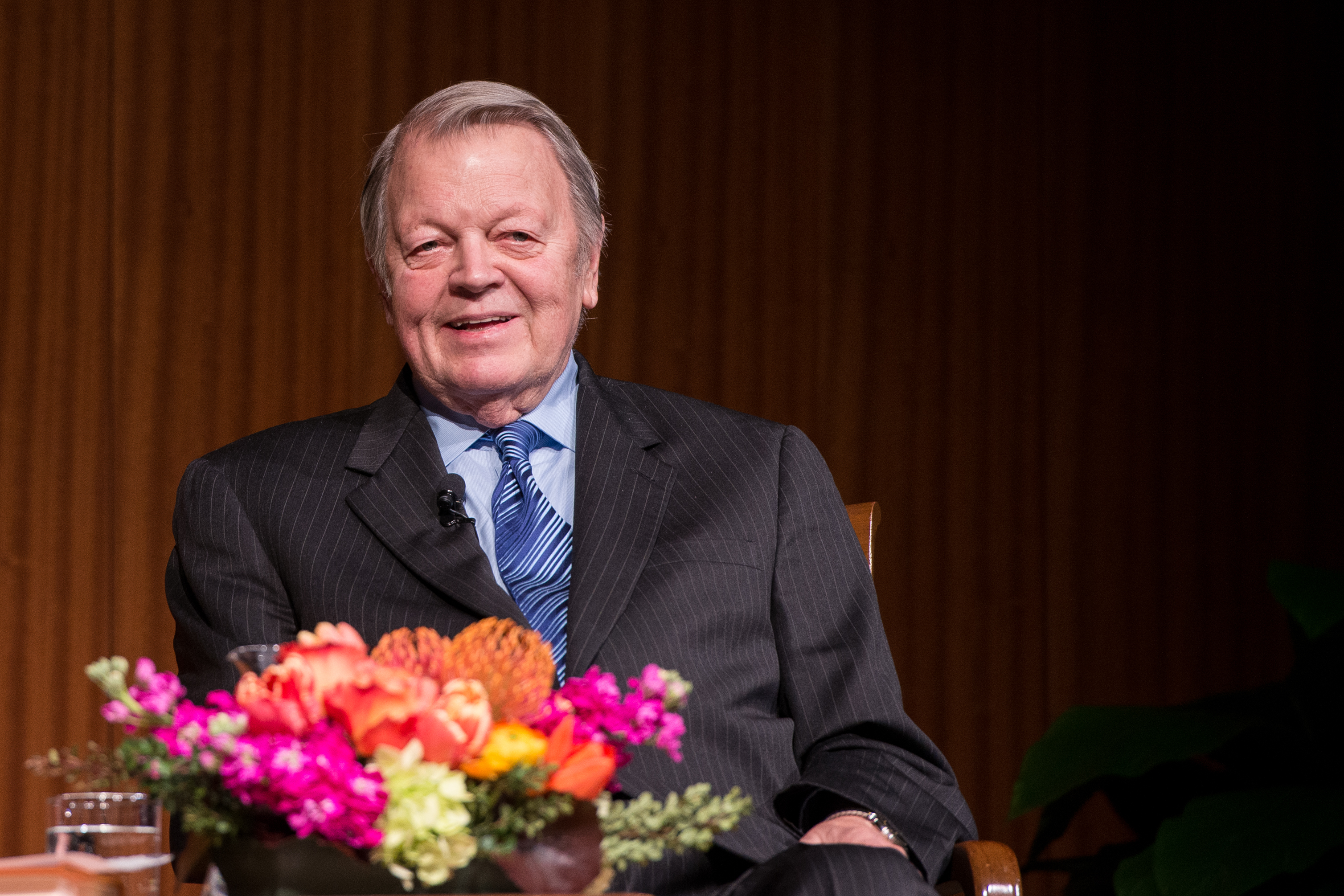
In 1978, Braverman spoke to Garry Wills about his time in prison with Alger Hiss.

After the article "Suspecting Alger Hiss" appeared in the New York Review of Books on April 20, 1978, Braverman spoke to its author, Garry Wills. (Wills, formerly a writer for William F. Buckley, Jr.'s magazine National Review, had expressed disbelief in Hiss's innocence, calling him a "man drab with the proper virtues," yet often found "telling odd little needless lies, or suffering inexplicable 'blackouts' of memory.) Calling himself a "civil rights lawyer," Braverman explained that he had served time in the Lewisburg prion with Alger Hiss. When the two met there, Braverman introduced himself as counsel to William Rosen in August 1948, to which Hiss replied curtly, "I know." Wills notes that most innocent people would have expressed great interest in talking to someone who might have details in helping their case. When Hiss was about to be released, Braverman told him the Communist Party would expect him make a statement. Hiss concurred, and Braverman wrote him a first draft. Wills concluded that Hiss "behaved like one still serving the Party."

== See also ==
- National Lawyers Guild
- Communist Party of the USA
- House Un-American Activities Committee
- Smith Act
- McCarthyism

== External sources ==
- Library of Congress – photo of Maurice Braverman with client Harold L. Round before HUAC (1951)
- The Washington Post

photo of Maurice Braverman (1974)

- UW Oshkosh Today – Harold L. Round (2008)
- Braverman v. Bar Association of Baltimore
