= George Edward Chalmer Hayes =

American lawyer

George E. C. Hayes
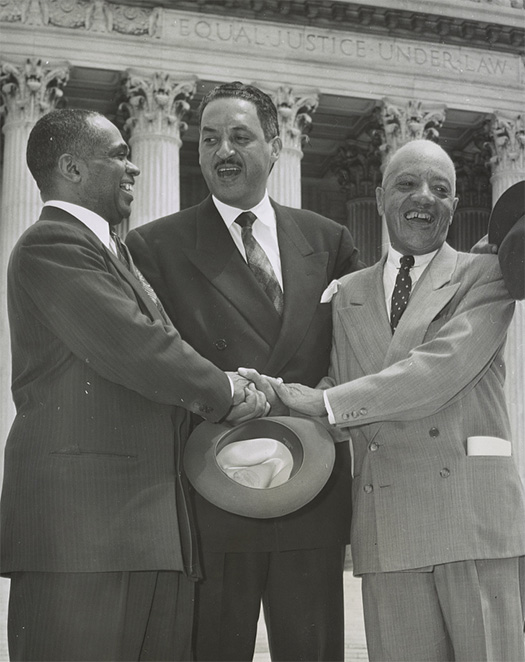
- George E. C. Hayes, Thurgood Marshall, and James Nabrit Jr. in 1954 winning Brown case
- Born: July 1, 1894; Richmond, Virginia
- Died: December 20, 1968 (aged 74); Washington, D.C.
- Education: Brown University (1915); Howard University School of Law (1918)
- Known for: Bolling v. Sharpe

George Edward Chalmers Hayes (July 1, 1894 – December 20, 1968) was a Washington, D.C., lawyer who defended Annie Lee Moss on March 11, 1954. He was the lead attorney in Bolling v. Sharpe (1954). In 1955 he became the first African American to serve on the District of Columbia Public Utilities Commission.

== Biography ==
He was born in Richmond, Virginia. His father was James H. Hayes. George graduated from Brown University in 1915, and then earned a law degree from Howard University School of Law in 1918. He taught at Howard University School of Law starting in 1924 while he maintained a private practice in the District of Columbia.

On March 11, 1954, he defended Annie Lee Moss.

In 1954 with Spottswood William Robinson III, he was the lead counsel on Bolling v. Sharpe, the companion case to Brown v. Board of Education. Hayes argued that denying African American students the liberty to attend non-segregated schools violated due process. Bolling was decided under the Fifth Amendment's due process clause while Brown was decided under the Fourteenth Amendment's Equal Protection Clause.

In 1955 he became the first African American to serve on the District of Columbia Public Utilities Commission.

He died on December 20, 1968.
