= Bernard Ades =

American lawyer (1903–1986)

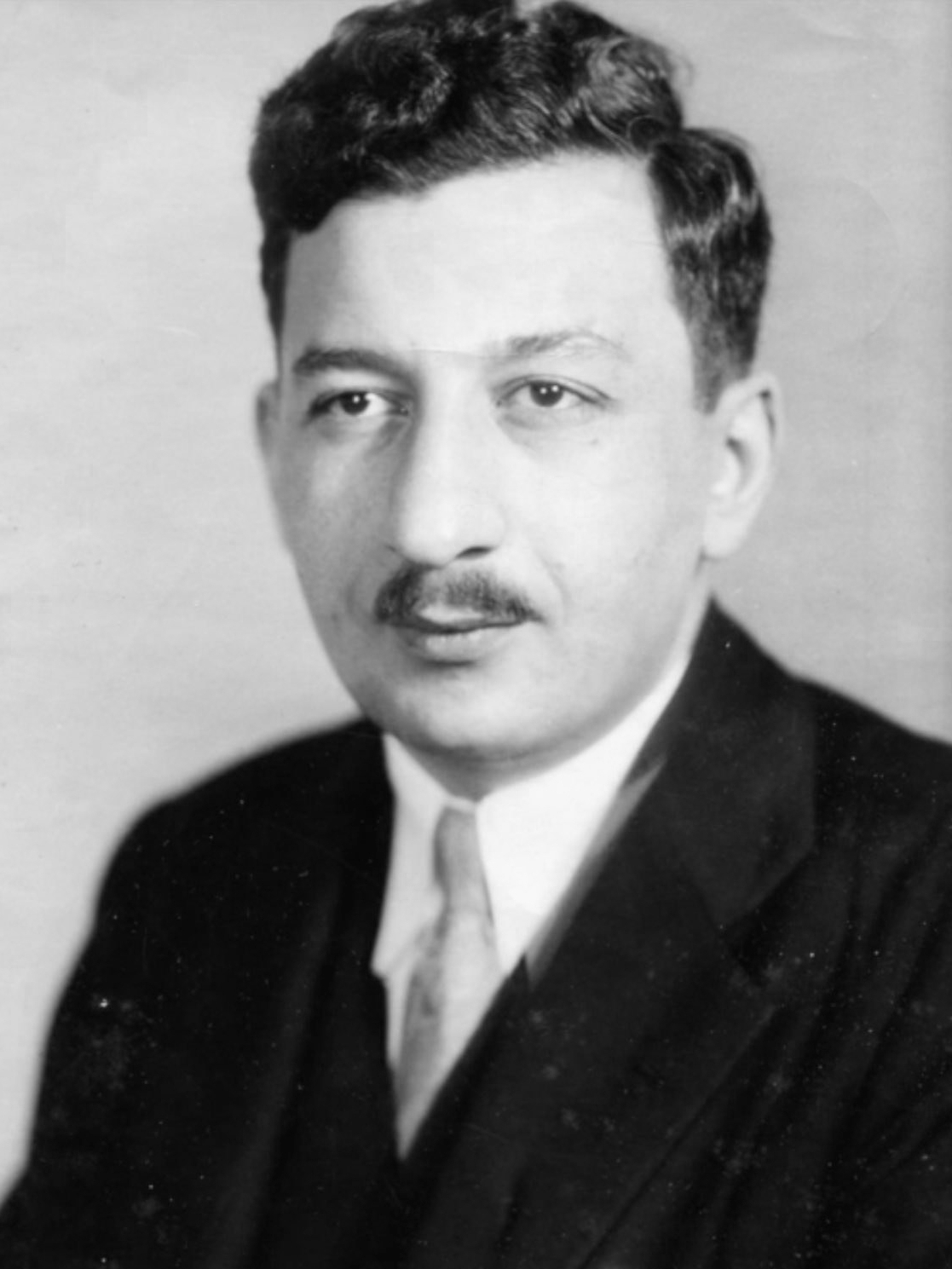
- Ades c. 1931
- Born: July 3, 1903; Baltimore, Maryland, U.S.
- Died: May 27, 1986 (aged 82)
- Occupation: Lawyer
- Spouses: Mary Ethel Hechler; Dora Rubinfine Ziebel
- Children: 2
- Military Career
- Allegiance: Spanish Republic
- Branch: International Brigades
- Service years: 1937
- Rank: Lieutenant
- Unit: The "Abraham Lincoln" XV International Brigade
- Conflicts: Spanish Civil War; Battle of Brunete; Battle of Quinto; Battle of Fuentes de Ebro

Bernard Ades (July 3, 1903 – May 27, 1986) was an American Communist who is most known for his defense of Euel Lee, an African American accused of murdering a white family in Maryland in 1931. During a murder trial which was still heavily influenced by "Jim Crow" laws, Ades set precedents that allowed a change of venue outside a highly prejudiced environment, and he fought for the right to have African Americans serve on jury panels.

== Early life ==
Bernard Ades was born in Baltimore, Maryland, the second child of Harry and Fanny Levine Ades. His father, a Russian born and devout traditionalist Jew, moved to America and started an umbrella manufacturing business with his brother, Simon Ades. This would later be of significance during the McCarthy Era when Bernard Ades would be put under special surveillance for his ties to Russia and his Communist beliefs.

== Education ==
Ades graduated from Baltimore City College (a secondary school). Afterward, he attended the University of Maryland Law School for his LLB and later earned a bachelor's degree in economics at Johns Hopkins University.

== Life and career ==
=== Legal career ===
Ades was a part of the Communist Party which influenced the types of legal cases he took. For the Euel Lee, “Orphan Jones” Case in 1931, Ades was employed by the International Labor Defense (affiliated with the Communist Party) in a campaign against lynching. Among others he represented Euel Lee (aka Orphan Jones) whose capital case captured national attention.

Euel Lee, an African American farmhand, was accused of murdering a white family of four for refusing to pay his full wages. The case took place in the Eastern Shore of Maryland, still heavily influenced by Jim Crow Laws with institutionalized discrimination. The tactics that Ades used to ensure a fair trial brought him infamy in Maryland and resulted in one instance of being mobbed and beaten.

Though Ades won his client a change of venue, two new trials and the right to have African Americans on jury panels, Ades lost the trial and Lee was soon after executed by hanging on October 28, 1933. However, his defense of Lee set precedents that would be used throughout the civil rights movement.

A fight ensued over the body where Ades demanded the right to bury Euel Lee in New York as he was granted the right to his client's body in Lee's last will and testament. Fearing riots and further racial unrest, Ades was denied the right to bury the body in New York and is currently interred in an unmarked grave in Brooklyn, Maryland.

Charges of unprofessional conduct were lodged in Maryland and before the US Bar for his handling of the case, and the ensuing social unrest which the coverage of the case caused. Ades were defended by Charles Houston of Howard University Law School and by “Young Thurgood” Marshall of the NAACP. This also set a precedent as the first case of a white man being defended in court by an African American.
The Maryland Bar publicly reprimanded Ades for his conduct while also praising his defense of Lee: "It does not seem to the court that the extreme punishment of disbarment should be inflicted. Much that *482 is blameworthy in the respondent's conduct carries its own antidote, for no one can succeed at the bar who comports himself as he has done. Taking into consideration the unquestioned service rendered in the Lee case, the injuries which the respondent suffered at the hands of lawless men while acting as counsel in that case, and the fact that he has already suffered a suspension from the bar of this court for approximately five months, it is believed that a public reprimand will suffice. This will be the judgment of the court." (RE Ades Court Case)

Re Ades sets the precedent that organizations could provide counsel to individuals, thus setting up the later defense for the NAACP in the school desegregation cases of the 1960s.

=== Brief political aspirations ===
In 1934, Ades ran for Governor of Maryland on the Communist Party ticket and received less than 8,000 votes. Despite the support of the African American community, he lost by a significant margin.

=== Military volunteer ===
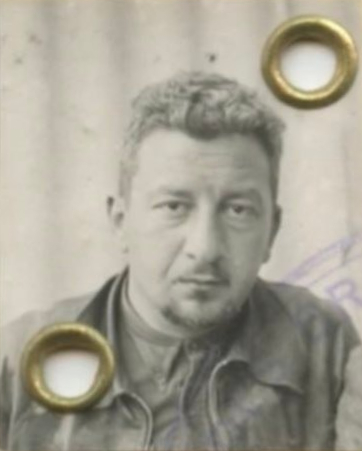
Ades's Spanish passport photo, 1937

On February 20, 1937, Ades sailed to Spain on the SS Île de France to join the International Brigades, who were fighting the Nationalists in the Spanish Civil War. Serving in the predominantly-American George Washington Battalion, Ades was first political commissar for the battalion's 1st Company under commander Hans Amlie, then was commissioned as a Lieutenant. He fought in the battles of Brunete, Quinto and Fuentes de Ebro. He returned to the United States on September 30, 1937 aboard the SS Normandie.

=== Later years ===
After returning to the United States, Ades was employed as an auditor with the Federal Housing Authority by 1940. Following his exposure by Congressman Thomas D'Alesandro Jr. of Baltimore for being a Communist, he was forced to resign in 1941 and was placed on J. Edgar Hoover’s list for security detention in case of war.

In 1941 New York State certified Ades as a Public Accountant and he practiced out of offices at 505 Fifth Avenue, New York, NY. His clients included Our World magazine (published by his best friend John P. Davis), United Electrical Workers, the American Soviet Trading Organization (AMTORG), and the Communist Party of the United States of America as well as a slew of smaller left wing organizations.

Active in the Bronx Reform Democrats Ades served as a delegate to the New York State Constitutional Convention. He opposed the war in Vietnam, participated in the marches on Washington against it and helped start the Dump Johnson movement in the Bronx.

In 1940, the FBI began their surveillance of Ades which only ceased when he entered Isabella House, a nursing home, in 1979. He died there and was buried in Baltimore Hebrew Congregation Cemetery, 2100 Belair Road, Maryland.

=== Personal ===
An early marriage was dissolved by divorce. In 1935 Ades married Mary Ethel Hechler, also a Communist Party devotee and had two daughters, Janet and Judith. Widowed in 1959 he married Dora Rubinfine Ziebel who predeceased him by four years.

== Documentary ==
“Red Father” is a documentary directed by Tova Beck-Friedman which explores the life of Ades through the eyes of his daughter Janet. She admires his wisdom, his generosity and his world outlook, and though as a child she thought him larger than life, as an adult she questions his ideology, its implementation and her father's Communist involvement. Throughout his trial and later tribulations, Ades remained true to his ideals.
