= Tova Beck-Friedman =

American artist, sculptor, writer and filmmaker

- Born: Tel Aviv, Israel
- Education: Purdue University; Goddard College; Tama Art University
- Occupations: Artist; Sculptor; Film director; Film producer; Film editor; Cinematographer; Editor
- Known for: Art, sculpture, documentary film
- Website: tbfstudio.com

Tova Beck-Friedman is an American artist, sculptor, writer and filmmaker based in New York City. Her work has been exhibited in the United States, Australia, Israel, Europe, and Japan. Her work is in the collection of Grounds For Sculpture, Yeshiva University Museum, Newark Museum, Sculpture Garden, the Shoah Film Collection and the National Museum of Women in the Arts in Washington DC.

== Early life and education ==
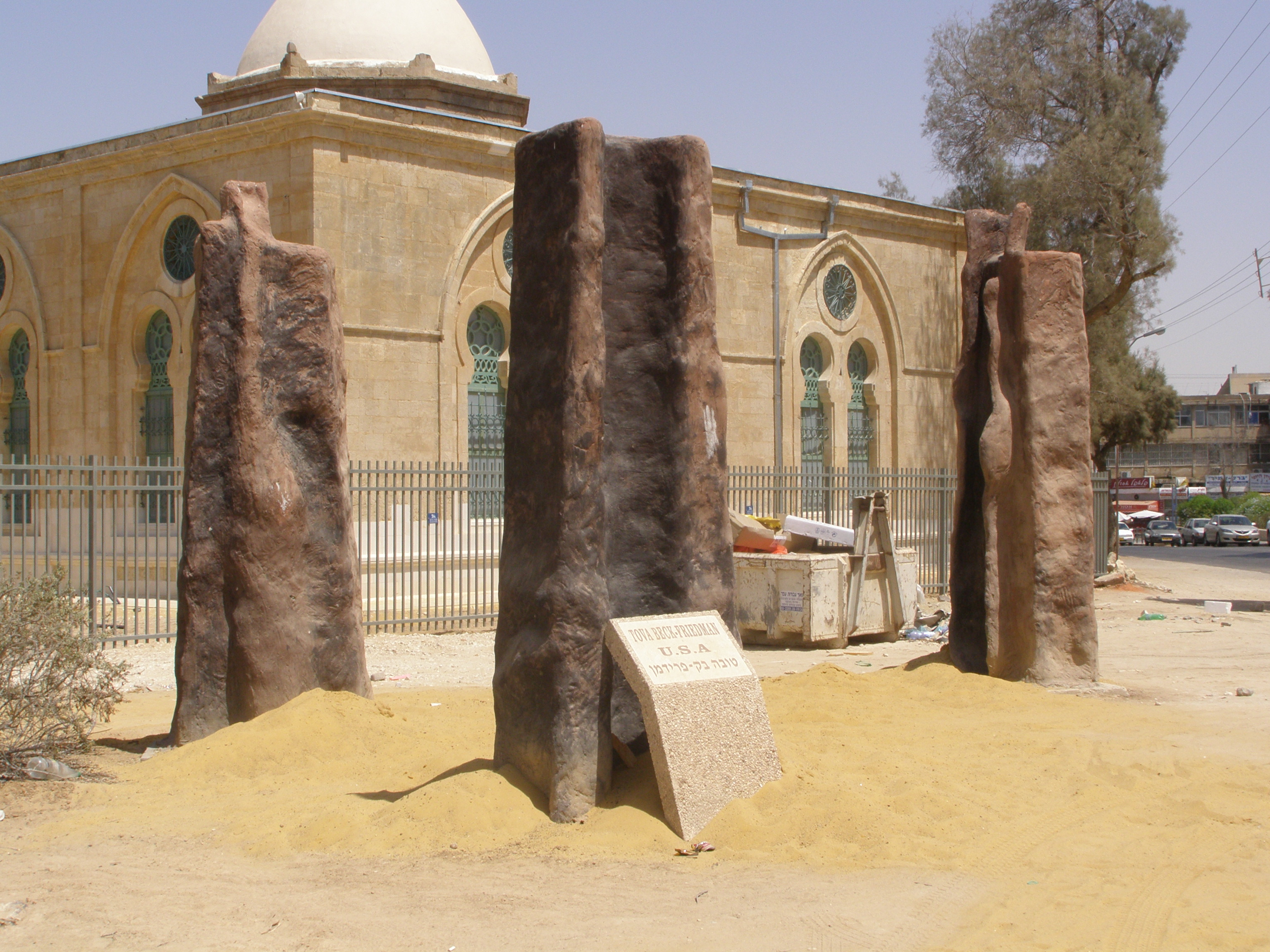
Beersheba, Staré Město (Old Town), Gan Remez, Keramické bienále 1997, by Beck-Friedman

Beck-Friedman holds a BA in Fine Arts from Purdue University and an MFA from Goddard College in Vermont. In 1982 she pursued a graduate student research studies at the Tama University of Art in Tokyo.

== Career ==
Beck-Friedman's work has been exhibited and shown at The International Artists' Museum for the 50th Venice Biennale, New Jersey State Museum, Monique Goldstrom Gallery, New York, Sculpture Biennale in Beersheba, Israel, The Newark Museum and Boleslawiec International Symposium, Poland. Her artwork has been installed and is part of Grounds For Sculpture, the Yeshiva University Museum, Newark Museum and Sculpture Garden.

Among her fellowships and awards are: Franconia Sculpture Park, MN; USA/ Jerom Artist Grant; Accessibility at Sumter, South Carolina; Boleslawiec International Symposium, Poland; Gulgong Symposium, Australia; Environmental Sculpture Symposium, MuJu, Korea; Skidmore College, Saratoga Springs, NY; The Center for Visual Arts, Be'er Sheva, Israel; New Jersey State Museum at Drew University; International Biennial in Beersheba, Israel.

Beck-Friedman's oeuvre ranges from sculpture to photographs to videos and documentaries. Her work is represented in major public collections, including the National Museum of Women in the Arts, Washington DC; Grounds For Sculpture, Hamilton, NJ, the Center for Jewish History, New York, NY, Newark Museum, NJ, New Jersey State Museum, Trenton, NJ, Yeshiva University Museum, New York, NY, Jersey City Museum, NJ, Cedarhurst Center for the Arts, Mt. Vernon, IL, and Český Krumlov Castle, Czech Republic.

In 2016, Beck-Friedman founded an online art portal called The Pythians, showcasing older women artists' work.

== Notable works ==
=== Installations ===
- "Excerpts of a Lost Forest: Homage to Ashera", at Grounds For Sculpture
- "Memory Imprints", at the Yeshiva University Museum
- "Primordial Quintet", at the Newark Museum Sculpture Garden
- "Triple Stelae", at Gan Remez, Be'er Sheva, Israel
- "Contemplation Pit", Franconia Sculpture Park, Minnesota.
- "Drawing Down the Moon", Gulfong, NSW, Australia.
- "Chrysalis", an environmental site specific-sculpture', Sumter, SC
- "Shadow", Leigh Yawkey Woodson Art Museum, Wasau, WI

=== Exhibitions ===
- 2015, Puffin Cultural Center, Teaneck, NJ
- 2005, Yeshiva University Museum, New York, NY
- 2005, The Jerusalem Cinematheque, Israel
- 2005, Maison de la culture Plateau Mont-Royal, Montreal, Canada
- 2004, Clark Hall Gallery, Southeastern Louisiana University
- 2003, Photo-graphic Galley, New York, NY
- 2002, Monique Goldstrom Gallery, New York, NY
- 2001, Monique Goldstrom Gallery, New York, NY
- 2001, Phoenix Project Gallery, New York, NY
- 1999, Ben Shahn Gallery, William Paterson college, NJ
- 1998, The Mitchell Museum, Mt. Vernon, IL
- 1998, Visual Arts Gallery, College of Morris, NJ
- 1997, Bergen Museum of Art, Paramus, NJ
- 1996, Lisa Parker Gallery, New York, NY
- 1996, New Jersey State Museum, Trenton, NJ
- 1993, Bill Bace Gallery, New York, NY
- 1992, Quietude Gallery, East Brunswick, NJ
- 1992, Schering-Plough Gallery, Madison, NJ
- 1991, The Newark Museum, NJ
- 1991, Bill Bace Gallery, New York, NY
- 1990, Herzliya Museum, Israel
- 1990, Visual Arts School Gallery, Be'er Sheva, Israel
- 1989, Michaelson & Orient Gallery, London, UK
- 1988, Amos Eno Gallery, New York, NY
- 1985, Amos Eno Gallery, New York, NY
- 1984, Gallery Q, Tokyo, JapanTokyo American Cultural Center, Japan

== Filmography ==
Year	Film	Description
2016	Gaia Regards Her Children	A film made to a poem by Alicia Ostriker
2015	On the Other Side	A poetic musing on aging, based on a poem by Natalie H. Rogers
2014	Red Father	The story of Bernard Ades, a Communist Jewish lawyer who in the 1930s fought for civil rights at home and against fascism in Spain
2011	Medusa's Head	A woman is slowly dancing in a columned underground cistern to the narration of Ovid's Metamorphoses
2011	Lot's Wife	An homage to the biblical Lot's wife
2010	Her World	A poor beautiful woman infatuated with movie star glamor – a Jewish immigrant from Eastern Europe arrives in West Virginia on the eve of the Great Depression
2008	Don't Ask	A docu-poem on language and identity
2007	A portrait of The Artist as an old Woman	Three octogenarian women artists share their insights into the creative energy and vitality that is not hampered by age
2005	At the Altar of Her Memories	Through a mix of puppetry and storytelling Bracha Ghilai, who spent her adolescent years in concentration camps, unlocks chapters from her painful past
2004	Passages	Filmed at the historic Lafayette cemetery in New Orleans, the video is set to investigate the psychology of memory
2005	Reflections	Fairy tail; parable; magic; myth; reflections; musing on the absurdities of social ideals
2004	Shadow Walk	Investigating the history and memory through dance movements
2002	Andromeda	The collaboration with dancer Dana Brewer-Plazinic, creating choreographed and improvised movement, responding to the Andromeda sculpture installation

== Awards/recognition ==
- Puffin Foundation grant for Red Father Documentary (2014)
- TGD9 Art Festival, Geneva, Switzerland, artist participant (2011)
- 2010 Athens, GA Jewish Film Festival Shorts Competition—2nd prize.
- Winner, Reel 13, New York
- Southeastern Louisiana University, Hammond, LA (2004) / visiting artist in residence
- TGD4 symposium; Tambacounda – Gèneve – Dakar, Senegal, artist participant
- Boleslawiec International Ceramic Symposium, Poland, artist participant (1996 & 2003)
- Geumgang International Nature Art Biennale, Korea (2003)
- Accessibility symposium – From the Outside In, Sumter, SC, artist participant (2003)
- Mishkenot Ha'omanim, Hezeliya, Israel, artist residence (200)
- Franconia Sculpture park, MN / Jerome Foundation Fellowship Program (1998)
- International Biennial, Be'er Sheva, Israel, artist participant (1995 & 1997)
- Clay/Sculpt Gulgong Symposium, Australia, artist participant (1995)
- Environmental Sculpture Symposium, MuJu, Korea, visiting artist (1994)
- Skidmore College, Saratoga Springs, NY / visiting artist (1990)
- The Center for Visual Arts, Be'er Sheva, Israel / visiting artist (1990)
- New Jersey Museum of Archaeology, Drew University, NJ, artist in residence (1998)
