= Andrea Friedman (historian) =

American historian and professor

Academic background
- Education: Ohio State University; University of Wisconsin–Madison

Academic work
- Discipline: History, women, gender, sexuality studies
- Institutions: Washington University in St. Louis

Andrea Friedman is an American historian of gender and sexuality with a focus on the modern United States. She is a professor in the Arts and Sciences at Washington University in St. Louis. Her teaching courses includes US women's and gender history, the history of sexuality, feminist politics, and queer and sexuality studies.

== Life ==
Friedman earned a B.A. (1978) in political science and M.A. (1985) in history from Ohio State University. She completed a Ph.D. (1995) in history at the University of Wisconsin–Madison. Her 1995 dissertation was titled, Prurient Interests: Anti-obscenity Campaigns in New York City, 1909-1945.

Friedman was a lecturer in history at the University of California, Santa Cruz from 1994 to 1996. In 1996, she joined Arts and Sciences at Washington University in St. Louis as an assistant professor of history and women, gender, and sexuality studies. Friedman was promoted to associate professor in 2004 and professor in July 2016. She is the director of the M.A. in women, gender, and sexuality studies and the M.A./J.D. programs director. Friedman is a professor emeritus in the department of history. In 2012, Friedman won the James M. Holobaugh Award for service to the LGBTQIA community.

== Selected works ==
- Friedman, Andrea (2000). Prurient Interests: Gender, Democracy, and Obscenity in New York City, 1909-1945. Columbia University Press. ISBN 978-0-231-11066-2.
- Friedman, Andrea (2014). Citizenship in Cold War America: The National Security State and the Possibilities of Dissent. University of Massachusetts Press. ISBN 978-1-62534-067-2.
