= Albert Blumberg =

American philosopher and political activist

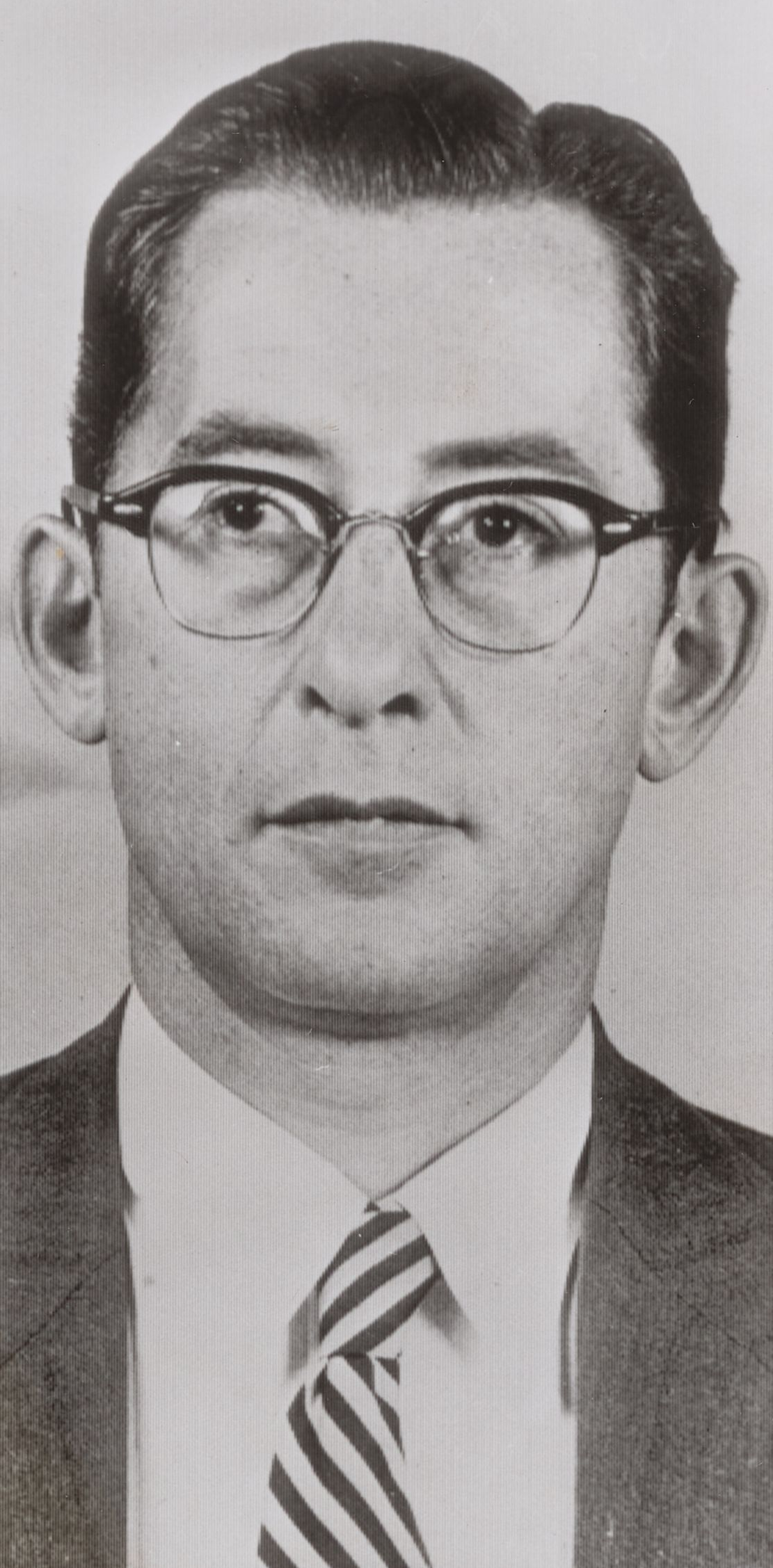
Blumberg c. 1954

Albert Emanuel Blumberg (August 10, 1906 – October 8, 1997) was an American philosopher and political activist. He was an official of the Communist Party for several years before joining the Democratic Party as a district leader.

== Early life ==
Albert was born in Baltimore, Maryland, to a middle-class Litvak family. He graduated from Johns Hopkins University and then furthered his education by acquiring a master's degree from Yale, studying at the Sorbonne, and receiving a doctorate from the University of Vienna. While studying in Vienna he became attracted to the Vienna circle of Logical Positivists, founded by the German philosopher Moritz Schlick.

== Professional life ==
Within philosophy Albert Blumberg was best known for having co-authored with Herbert Feigl a paper which appeared in the Journal of Philosophy entitled, "Logical Positivism: A New Movement In European Philosophy." For logical positivists the discipline of philosophy hinged on one task; to clarify the meanings of concepts and ideas, and what sort of statements really did have any "meaning" in the first place. There are only two distinctions of statements that have any meaning to logical positivists. The first involves necessary truths of logic, mathematics, and ordinary language. The second involves empirical propositions about the world around us that were not necessary truths, instead they are regarded as true with greater or lesser probability. In addition to being a student and professor of philosophy, Albert Blumberg also fought for economic and social reforms. In the year 1933 he joined the Maryland Communist Party where he served for four years as the chair of the Agitprop Committee.

== Political activism ==
In 1937 Blumberg resigned his faculty position at Johns Hopkins, publicly announced his party membership, and took on the created position of district administrative secretary for the Communist Party. Blumberg also ran for public office on several occasions, for example, Communist candidate for Mayor of Baltimore City, 1939. As well Blumberg was several times under suspicion by various governmental organizations for communist activities, becoming one of the first convicted under a provision of the 1940 Smith Act. During his senior years Blumberg remained politically active, although not in the communist party. He enjoyed somewhat more success as the Democratic Party district leader in Manhattan. He died at the age of 91 near his home in Manhattan, New York City.

== See also ==
- American philosophy
- List of American philosophers
