= Timeline of strikes in 1946 =

Strikes in 1946

In 1946, a number of labour strikes, labour disputes, and other industrial actions occurred.

== Background ==
A labour strike is a work stoppage caused by the mass refusal of employees to work. This can include wildcat strikes, which are done without union authorisation, and slowdown strikes, where workers reduce their productivity while still carrying out minimal working duties. It is usually a response to employee grievances, such as low pay or poor working conditions. Strikes can also occur to demonstrate solidarity with workers in other workplaces or pressure governments to change policies.

== Timeline ==
=== Continuing strikes from 1945 ===
- 1945–1946 Charleston Cigar Factory strike
- 1945–1946 General Motors strike
- 1945–1946 Senegal general strike
- United States strike wave of 1945–1946

=== January ===
- 1946 Haitian Revolution
- Royal Air Force strikes of 1946
- 1946 Singapore general strike, part of the background and causes of the Malayan Emergency.
- 1946 United States steel strike
- 1946 Westinghouse Electric strike

=== February ===
- 1946 Cairo general strike, general strike in the Kingdom of Egypt after several students were killed protesting against British occupation.
- New York City tugboat strike of 1946
- Royal Indian Navy mutiny

=== March ===
- 1946 INTO Teachers' Strike, 7-month strike by the Irish National Teachers' Organisation.
- 1946 Queensland meatworkers' strike
- Toho strikes

=== April ===
- 1946 Palestine general strike

=== May ===
- Pilbara strike
- 1946 Rochester general strike

=== June ===
- 1946 Montreal Cottons strike

=== July ===
- 1946 Indian postal strike
- Gavurbağı massacre
- 1946 La Paz riots
- 1946 Stelco strike

=== August ===
- 1946 African Mine Workers' Union strike
- Direct Action Day
- 1946 South Indian railway strike

=== September ===
- 1946 Alberta farmers' strike
- 1946 Burmese police strike, strike by police in Mynamar protesting against British rule in Burma.
- Hawaiian sugar strike of 1946
- Korean general strike of September 1946
- 1946 Singapore Harbour Board strike, strike by Singapore Harbour Board dockworkers.

=== October ===
- Autumn Uprising of 1946, in Korea.
- 1946 Dartmoor strike, prison strike by military prisoners at HM Prison Dartmoor in the United Kingdom.
- 1946 London hotel strike

=== November ===
- 1946 Philadelphia newspapers' strike
- 1946 St. Paul teachers' strike, one of the first teachers' strikes in American history.

=== December ===
- 1946 Oakland general strike
