= Marine Engineers' Beneficial Association =

American trade union

- Abbreviation: MEBA
- Formation: February 23, 1875; 151 years ago
- Type: Trade union
- Headquarters: Washington, DC, US
- Location: United States
- Members: 23,400 (2014)
- President: Adam Vokac
- Secretary-treasurer: Roland "Rex" Rexha
- Affiliations: AFL–CIO
- Website: mebaunion.org
- Formerly called: National Marine Engineers Association

The Marine Engineers' Beneficial Association (MEBA) is the oldest maritime trade union in the United States still in existence, established in 1875. MEBA primarily represents licensed mariners, especially deck and engine officers working in the United States Merchant Marine aboard US-flagged vessels. It is a member union of the AFL–CIO.

MEBA officers work in both the oceans and the Great Lakes in many settings, including on container ships, tankers (including LNG carriers), cruise ships, drillships, tugboats and ferries, as well as in various capacities in the shoreside ship transport and marine industries and on government-contracted ships of the US Maritime Administration's Ready Reserve Force and US Navy's Military Sealift Command. Merchant mariners deliver critical defense cargo to United States armed forces in times of military conflict.

Members and their families benefit from MEBA's collective bargaining agreements through the union's Medical Plan, 401(k) Plan, Pension Trust, and Vacation Plan.

== History ==
=== Formation ===
The nation's oldest maritime union was formed out of necessity in the late nineteenth century. The introduction of steamships in the early 1800s increased demand for engineers to keep them operating. Steamship owners on the Mississippi and Great Lakes were competing with one another and demanding greater speeds from their vessels. However, the concept of steam engines powering these ships was still relatively new and the study of marine engineering was barely starting to develop as engineers learned aboard the ship. The engineers hired to manage the steam engines were shore-side engineers since the marine engineer did not exist yet. It was a completely new kind of field compared to the shore-side work they were used to. The unfamiliarity with the specifics of what engineers were working with and the fact that the steam engine was in its earliest stages meant that the ships were boarded with engineers of minimal marine engineering knowledge and unreliable machinery. This increase in speed greatly reduced safety in the engine room due to fires and boiler explosions. Even with increased risk, the wages remained the same.

The ongoing injuries and deaths from working on steamships finally motivated engineers to demand safety regulations from Congress to acquire protection and improve working conditions. In 1838, the first Steamboat Act was implemented; however it was very inefficient because its legislation was vague, so the tragedies on steamships continued. The lack of improvement from the Steamboat Act led to an even greater demand to make the act stronger and more efficient. This continued until 1852 when Congress passed an enhanced version of the Steamboat Act, which required engineers to have a license to work on steamboats and enforced an inspection system for the machinery.

The first gathering of the Buffalo Association of Engineers in 1854 was an essential model for the creation of the MEBA. The Buffalo Association of Engineers implemented topics of discussion such as wages, which helped them fight wage cuts until they disbanded the association. When wages started to be cut again, cities such as Cleveland, Chicago, and Detroit took after the Buffalo Association and created organizations of their own. Individually, these city-wide associations were merely effective; therefore this brought on the idea to unite the one-city associations as a national movement. The Buffalo Association of Engineers began corresponding with other marine engineer associations around the country. In February 1875, the leaders of five steamship unions out of Buffalo, New York, Cleveland, Ohio, Detroit, Michigan, Chicago, Illinois, and Baltimore, Maryland, convened in Cleveland, Ohio, to join together. This organization called itself the National Marine Engineers Association and chose Garret Douw of Buffalo as its president. (The word Beneficial was added in 1883.)

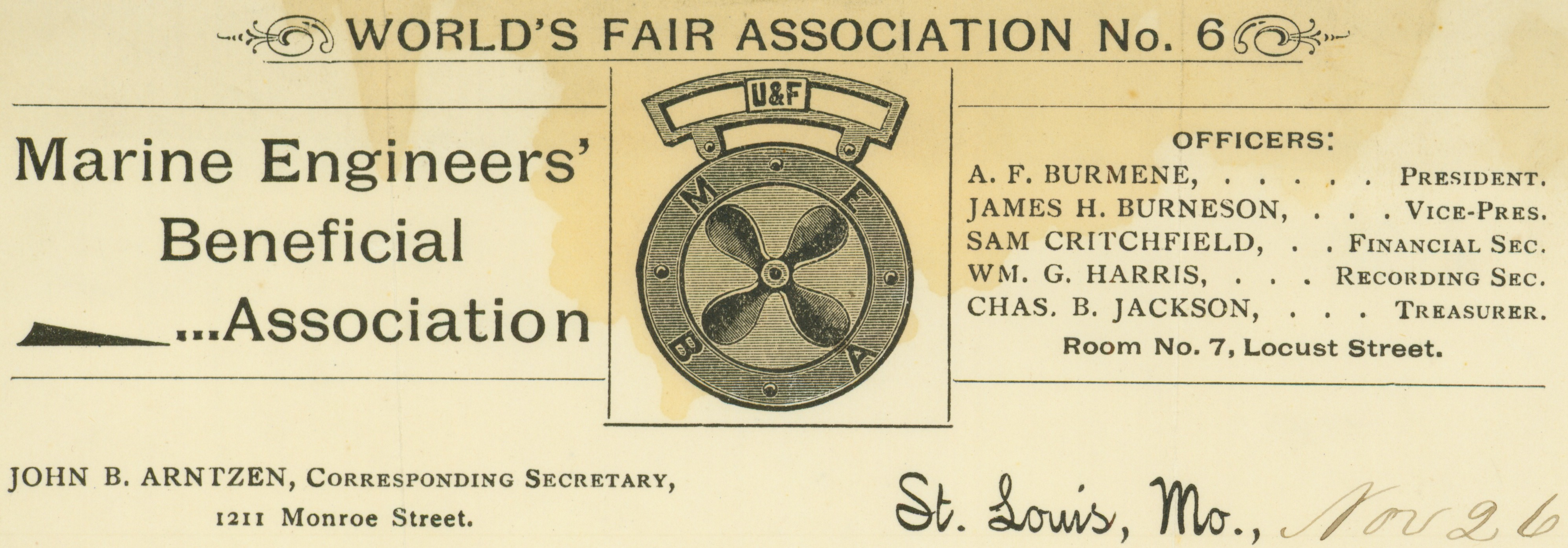
World's Fair Association No. 6 letterhead of the Marine Engineers' Beneficial Association, St. Louis, Missouri in 1901

After the association's formation, the union lobbied Washington legislators to pass bills in 1884 and 1896 that would make it law for all American vessels to possess only American officers and to grant the ability for marine engineers to attain licenses, respectively.

=== Twentieth century ===
During World War I, the need for more engineers called for the US government to quickly train marine engineers. However, after the war, such practices continued. On January 20, 1919, MEBA agreed to petition the use of "30-day engineers", believing there were enough resources to properly train the next generation of merchant marines.

On January 9, 1919 MEBA Union Local No. 33 participated in the 1919 New York City Harbor Strike, as one of six unions that made up the Marine Workers Affiliation of the Port of New York, shutting down the port for weeks.

In 1921, MEBA went on strike again in response to wage reductions. With a surplus of engineers from the war and a shortage of employment opportunities, the strike was a disaster for the union, which lost much of its membership in the aftermath. Ship owners took advantage of the union's weakness by establishing a company union, the American Society of Marine Engineers, to supplant it. MEBA only recovered after the "Big Strike" of 1934, involving multiple unions, forced ship owners to capitulate and recognize MEBA as the legitimate representative of marine engineers.

The Marine Engineers' Beneficial Association, like a wide variety of worker unions, supplied labor during World War II for both naval and engineering spectrums. The size of MEBA's membership, like that of all American maritime unions has varied widely over the years. At the end of World War I, they had more than 22,000 members, but by 1934, their membership was down to 4,848. Membership ballooned during World War II, with job opportunities for about 200,000 seamen.

The Marine Engineers’ Beneficial Association established the Calhoon Marine Engineers’ Beneficial Association Engineering School in 1966 in the Southern Hotel, Baltimore, Maryland which offered a three-year program designed to train high school graduates to become licensed third assistant engineers until 1986. The Calhoon school was relocated to Easton, Maryland in 1979. The school offers over fifty courses to union members and outside engineering professionals (as of May 1, 2007) and provides living arrangements for attendees.

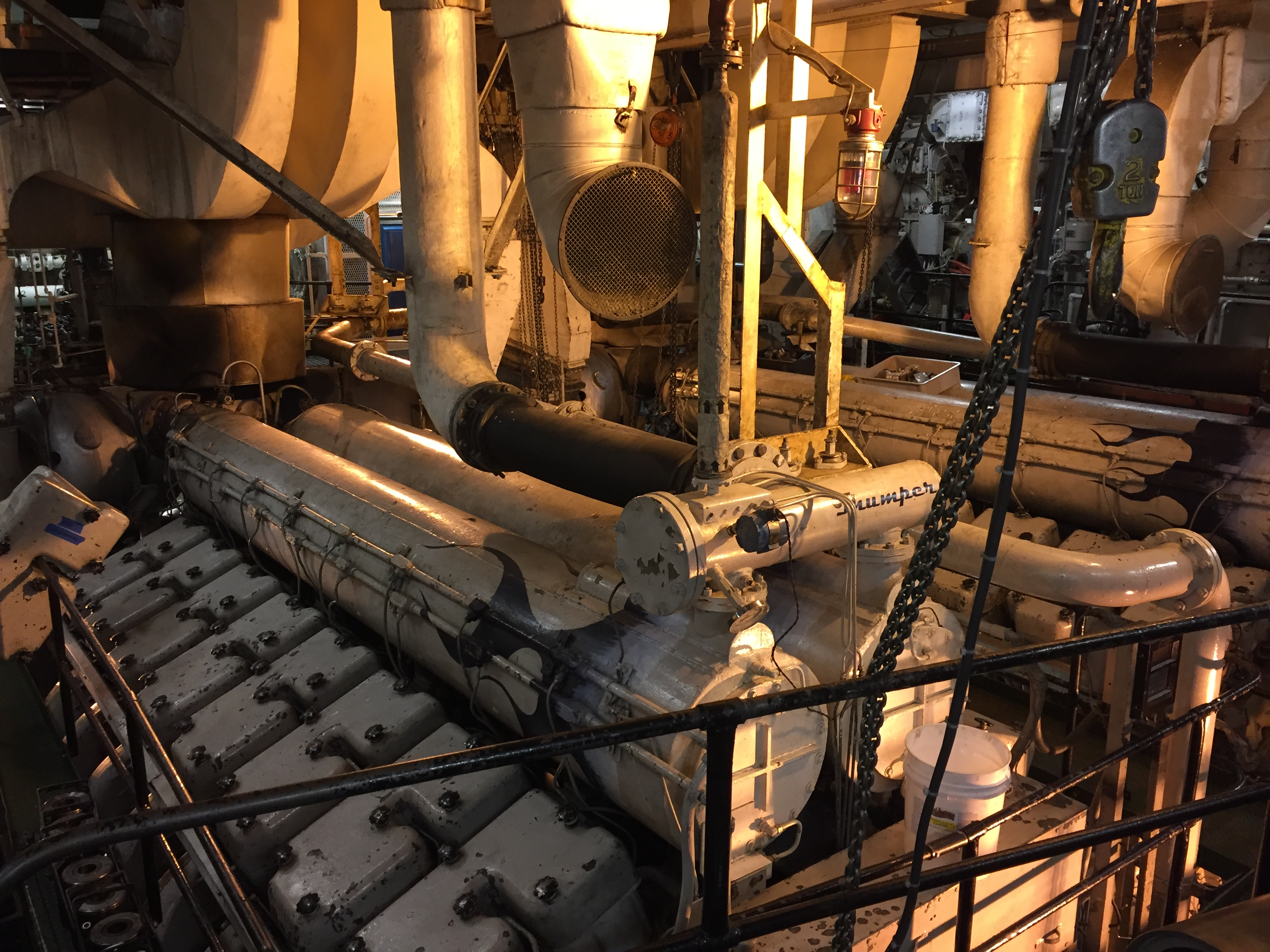
Colleges like the California Maritime Academy train engineering cadets in engine rooms who may seek to join MEBA after graduating.

== Presidents ==
- 1875 : Garret Douw
- 1876–1881 : Abner L. Foote
- 1881 : Thomas H. Nelson
- 1882 : Edward D. Bateman
- 1883 : James H. Reid
- 1884 : William E. Russell
- 1885 : Andrew Ritter
- 1886 : Andrew Payne
- 1887–1888 : Aspinwall Fuller
- 1889 : Ambrose L. Boyce
- 1890–1892 : John H. Galway
- 1893–1903 : George Uhler
- 1904–1906 : Frank A. Jones
- 1907–1914 : William F. Yates
- 1915–1916 : A. Bruce Gibson
- 1917–1926 : William S. Brown
- 1926–1930 : William F. Yates
- 1930–1934 : C. M. Sheplar
- 1935–1936 : William S. Brown
- 1937–1949 : Samuel J. Hogan
- 1950–1959 : Herbert L. Daggett
- 1960–1963 : E. N. Altman
- 1963–1984 : Jesse M. Calhoon
- 1985–1992 : C. E. (Gene) DeFries
- 1992–1994 : Gordon Ward
- 1995 : Joel Bem
- 1996–1998 : Alex Shandrowsky
- 1999–2001 : Larry O'Toole
- 2002–2007 : Ron Davis
- 2008—2010 : Don Keefe
- 2011—2013 : Mike Jewell
- 2014—2020 : Marshall Ainley
- 2021— : Adam Vokac

== Union benefits ==
By becoming a MEBA member, MEBA provides a medical plan includes prescription drugs, dental, mental health, disability, life, accidental death, and dismemberment benefits for MEBA members and their dependents by completing what they call a Permanent Data Form. They also offer four kinds of MEBA Pension Plans. The “Regular Pension Plan” means members can retire with a regular pension plan if members have twenty years of accredited pension years, regardless of what age they retire. The “Reduced Pension Plan” is for those who have less than twenty accredited pension years and have reached the normal retirement age of sixty-five years old or the fifth anniversary of the start date of the pension plan. The “Early Retirement Pension” is for those who choose to retire early when members reach the age of sixty and have a minimum of fifteen accredited pension years. Lastly, there is the “Disability Pension” in which members can retire early if they have become permanently disabled and have a minimum of ten accredited pension years. There are also ways these pensions can be distributed in situation of marriage, children, and death. MEBA also provides a 401(k) plan in which members have the option enroll for and if they do they can name a beneficiary. A Vacation Plan is also provided in which is determined by the collective bargaining agreement with the employer, the type of vessel members work on, number of days of Covered Employment, and their rating.

== Directory information ==
Headquarters: 444 North Capitol Street, N.W., Suite 800, Washington, DC 20001-1570

- Current president: Adam Vokac (2021–present)
- Current executive vice president: Max Alper (2025–present)
- Current secretary-treasurer: Roland "Rex" Rexha (2021–present)
- Current Atlantic Coast vice president: Jason Callahan (2017–present)
- Current Gulf Coast vice president: Adam Smith (2021–present)

== Associated port locations ==
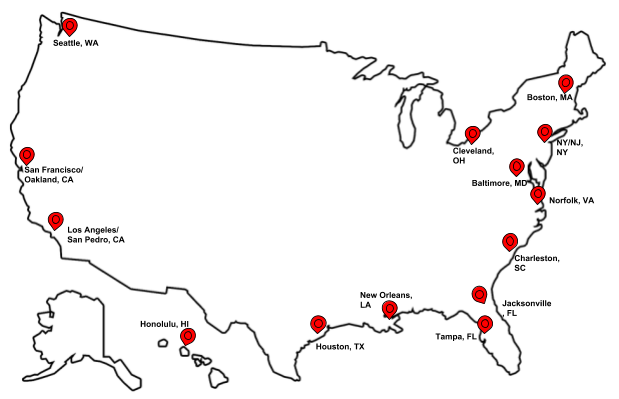
A map of the port locations that MEBA works with

- Seattle, Washington
- San Francisco/ Oakland, California
- Los Angeles/ San Pedro, California
- Honolulu, Hawaii
- Houston, Texas
- New Orleans, Louisiana
- Tampa, Florida
- Jacksonville, Florida
- Charleston, South Carolina
- Norfolk, Virginia
- Baltimore, Maryland
- New York/ New Jersey
- Cleveland, Ohio
- Boston, Massachusetts
- Portland, Maine

== See also ==
- International Organization of Masters, Mates & Pilots
- Seafarers International Union of North America
- National Maritime Union
- Maritime Trades Department, AFL–CIO
- United States Merchant Marine
- United States Maritime Administration
- American Bureau of Shipping
- International Maritime Organization
