= International Organization of Masters, Mates & Pilots =

Labor union

MM&P
- International Organization of Masters, Mates & Pilots
- Founded: 1880
- Headquarters: Linthicum Heights, Maryland
- Location: United States
- Members: 5,500 (2018)
- Key people: Donald J. Marcus, President
- Affiliations: AFL-CIO
- Website: www.bridgedeck.org

The International Organization of Masters, Mates & Pilots or MM&P is a United States labor union representing licensed mariners.

MM&P represents licensed deck officers on U.S.-flag commercial vessels sailing offshore, on the inland waterways and on civilian-crewed ships in the government fleet; state-licensed marine pilots; marine engineers; mariners who work on tug, ferry and harbor tour vessels in New York Harbor and throughout the Northeast; licensed and unlicensed mariners who work on dredges; and maritime industry shore-side clerical and service workers. In addition, it operates two training facilities: the Maritime Institute of Technology & Graduate Studies near Baltimore, Maryland; and the Pacific Maritime Institute, in Seattle, Washington. It operates hiring halls in port cities in the continental United States and Hawaii.

== History ==
MM&P's historical roots lie in the frustration felt by steamship pilots who were criminalized for marine accidents but had no voice in policy. They organized in New York in 1887, forming the first local of the American Brotherhood of Steamship Pilots. As more locals were founded, shipmasters expressed interest in joining. As a result, in 1891, the fledgling union changed its name to the American Association of Masters and Pilots of Steam Vessels.

=== 20th Century ===
In 1900, it expanded once again to include all deck officers, and changed its name to the American Association of Masters, Mates, and Pilots of Steam Vessels.

On January 9, 1919 MM&P Local, Harbor No. 1 participated in the 1919 New York City Harbor Strike, as one of six unions that made up the Marine Workers Affiliation of the Port of New York, shutting down the port for weeks.

MM&P was active in the 1934 West Coast waterfront strike, joining in along with the Marine Engineers' Beneficial Association (MEBA) on 19 May 1934. Together, in 1937 the two unions became part of the Maritime Federation of the Pacific (MFP). The alliance, however, was short-lived. In July 1938, MM&P withdrew from the MFP, along with the Sailors' Union of the Pacific and the Marine Firemen, Oilers, Watertenders, and Wipers of the Pacific Coast Union.

In 1954, the union added Canadian locals, and changed its name to the International Organization of Masters, Mates & Pilots.

In 1971, by becoming an affiliate of the International Longshoremen's Association, MM&P was able to distance itself from the fight between the American Federation of Labor's (AFL) Seafarers International Union on one side and the Congress of Industrial Organizations's (CIO) National Maritime Union (NMU) on the other. The link has sometimes been tenuous: some 17 years later, when NMU joined MEBA, MM&P very nearly followed suit.

=== 21st Century ===
In 2017, members of the union approved MM&P's affiliation with the Panamanian Union of Captains and Deck Officers (Union de Capitanes y Oficiales de Cubierta-UCOC). UCOC is the exclusive representative for the bargaining unit covering all licensed deck officers of the tugboat fleet, dredges and related vessels operated by the Panama Canal Authority.

In 2020, Masters, Mates & Pilots separated from the ILA and once again became an affiliate of the AFL-CIO.

In 2021, members of Masters, Mates & Pilots approved MM&P's affiliation with the Mexican merchant marine union, Orden Mexicana de Profesionales Marítimos y Portuarios, Similares y Conexos (Orden Maritima).

== See also ==
- American Maritime Officers
- National Maritime Union
- Marine Engineers' Beneficial Association
- International Ship Masters' Association
- Sailors' Union of the Pacific
- United States Merchant Marine
