= New York Harbor =

Harbor in New York and New Jersey

Coordinates: 40°40′06″N 74°02′44″W

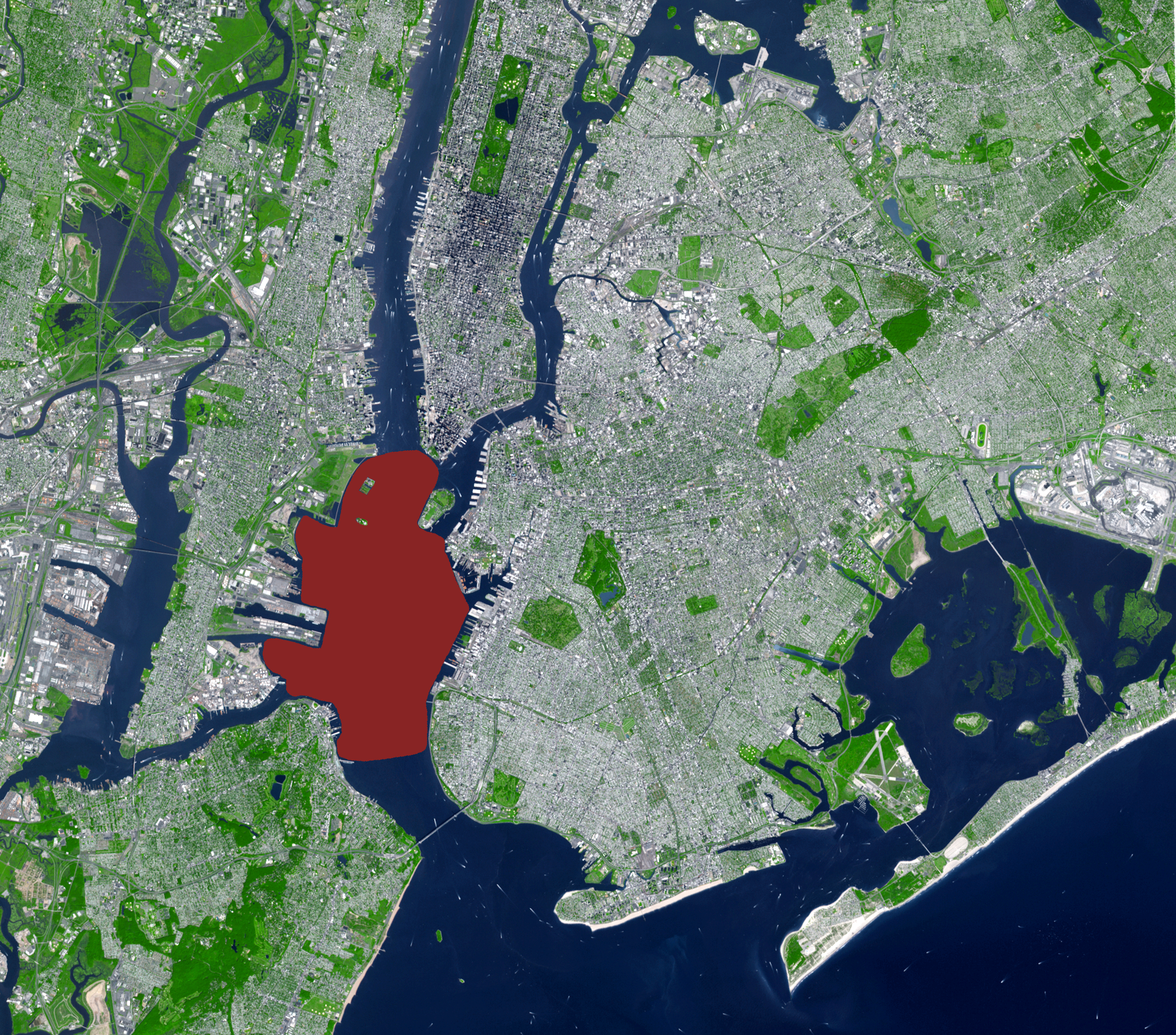
Upper New York Bay highlighted in red. It is connected to Lower New York Bay on the south by the Narrows. Ellis Island (north) and Liberty Island (south) are shown in the northwest corner of the bay.

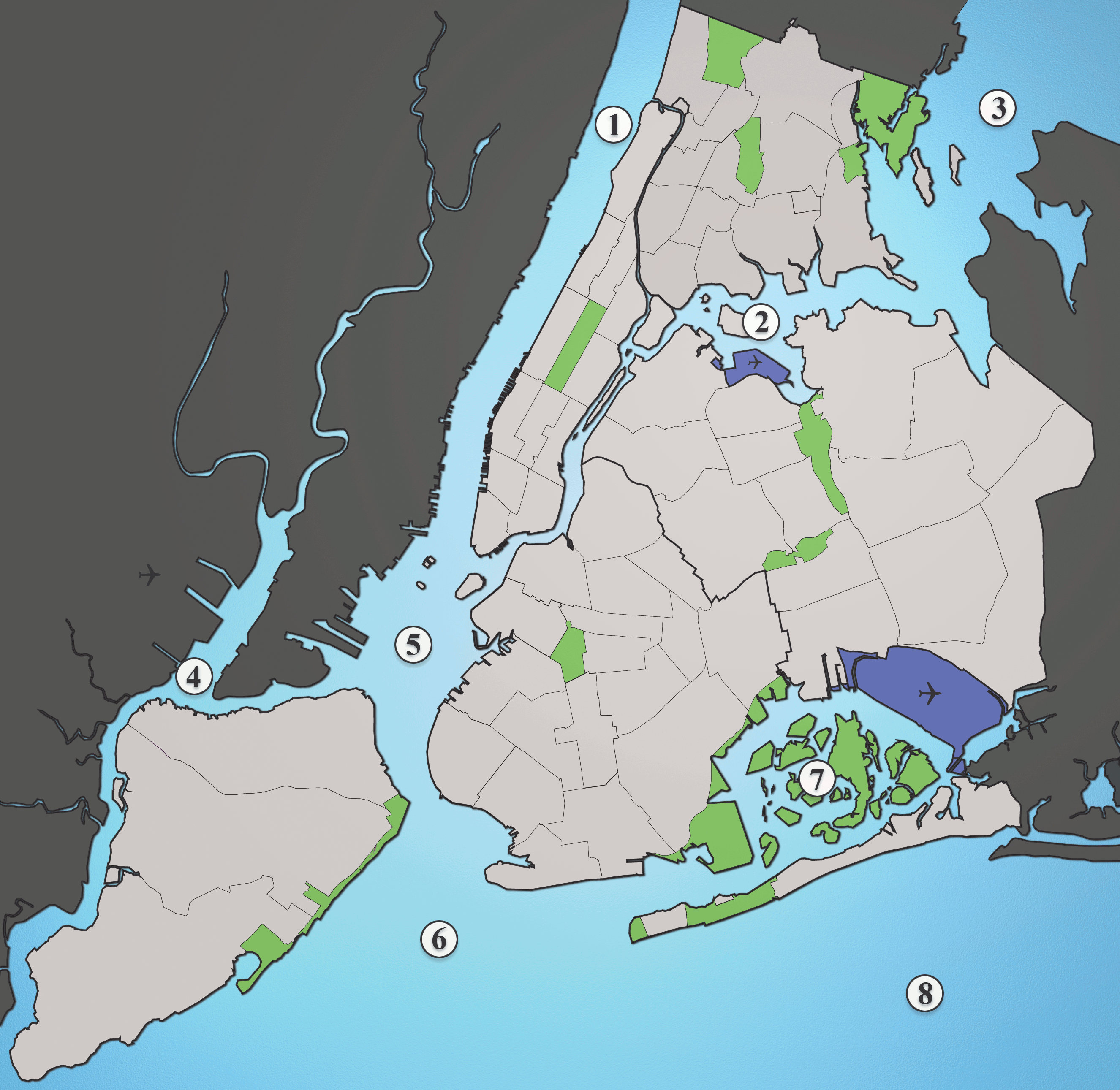
Estuary waterways: 1. Hudson River, 2. East River, 3. Long Island Sound, 4. Newark Bay, 5. Upper New York Bay, 6. Lower New York Bay, 7. Jamaica Bay, 8. Atlantic Ocean

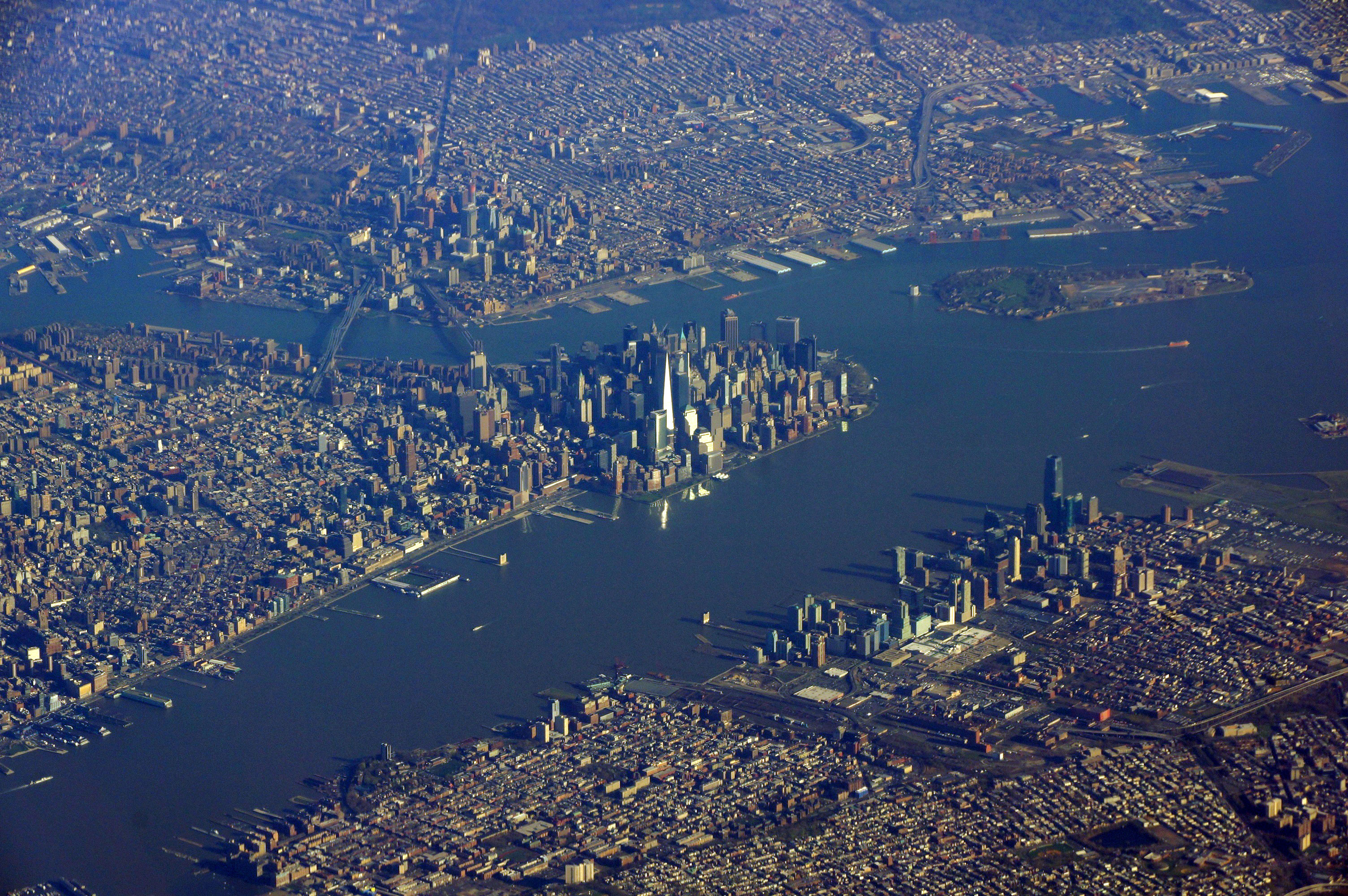
New York Harbor and Upper New York Bay (right), Hudson River (lower left), and East River (upper left) in April 2013

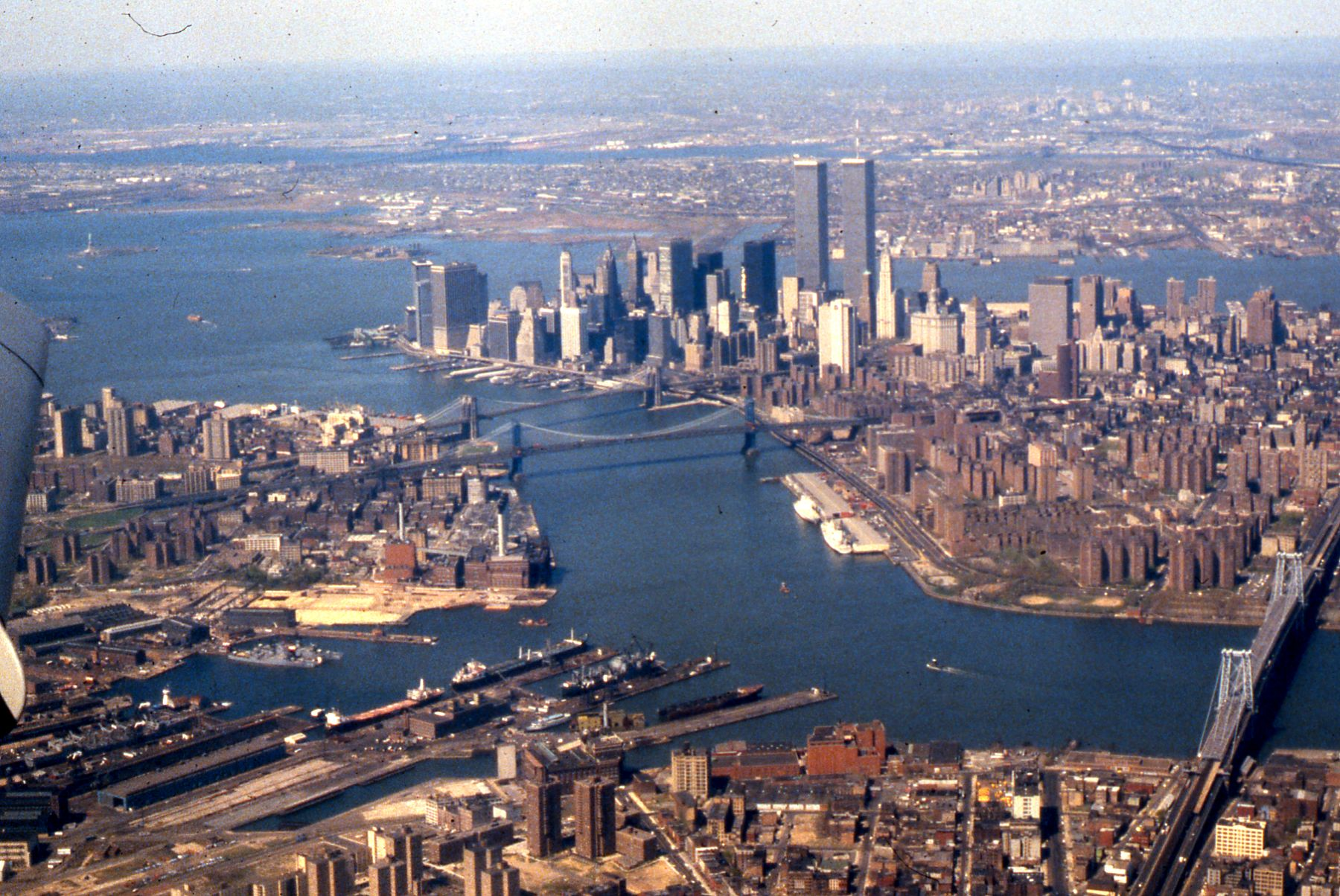
Wallabout Bay and East River (foreground), Hudson River (at right), Upper New York Bay (left) and Newark Bay in the distance in April 1981

New York Harbor is a tidal body of water forming the upper part of New York Bay within the New York–New Jersey Harbor Estuary. Located on the East Coast of the United States at the mouth of the Hudson River, it is connected to Long Island Sound by the East River, which despite its name is actually a tidal strait.

New York Harbor is generally synonymous with Upper New York Bay, which is enclosed by the New York City boroughs of Manhattan, Brooklyn, and Staten Island and the Hudson County, New Jersey, municipalities of Jersey City and Bayonne, although in colloquial usage it can sometimes expand to cover Upper and Lower New York Bay. New York Harbor is one of the largest natural harbors in the world.

== Overview ==
The harbor is fed by the waters of the Hudson River (historically called the North River as it passes Manhattan), as well as the Gowanus Canal. It is connected to Lower New York Bay by the Narrows, to Newark Bay by the Kill Van Kull, and to Long Island Sound by the East River, which, despite its name, is actually a tidal strait. It provides the main passage for the waters of the Hudson River as it empties through the Narrows. The channel of the Hudson as it passes through the harbor is called the Anchorage Channel and is approximately 50 feet deep in the midpoint of the harbor.

A project to replace two water mains between Brooklyn and Staten Island, which will eventually allow for dredging of the channel to nearly 100 feet (30 m), was begun in April 2012.

The harbor contains several islands including Governors Island, near the mouth of the East River, as well Ellis Island, Liberty Island, and Robbins Reef which are supported by a large underwater reef on the New Jersey side of the harbor. The reef was historically one of the largest oyster beds in the world and provided a staple for the diet of all classes of citizens both locally and regionally until the end of the 19th century, when the beds succumbed to pollution.

Historically, it has played an extremely important role in the commerce of the New York metropolitan area. The Statue of Liberty National Monument recalls the immigrant experience during the late 19th and early 20th century.

Since the 1950s, container ship traffic has been primarily routed through the Kill Van Kull to Port Newark-Elizabeth Marine Terminal, where it is consolidated for easier automated transfer to land conveyance. As a consequence, the waterfront industries of the harbor experienced a decline leading to diverse plans for revitalization, though important maritime uses remain at Red Hook, Port Jersey, MOTBY, Constable Hook, and parts of the Staten Island shore. Liberty State Park opened in 1976. In recent years, it has become a popular site for recreation sailing and kayaking.

The harbor is traversed by the Staten Island Ferry, which runs between Whitehall Street at the southernmost tip of Manhattan near Battery Park (South Ferry) and St. George Ferry Terminal on Richmond Terrace in Staten Island near Richmond County Borough Hall and Richmond County Supreme Court. NY Waterway operates routes across the bay and through The Narrows to locations near Sandy Hook.

The harbor supports a very diverse population of marine species, allowing for recreational fishing, most commonly for striped bass and bluefish.

== History ==
=== Colonial era ===
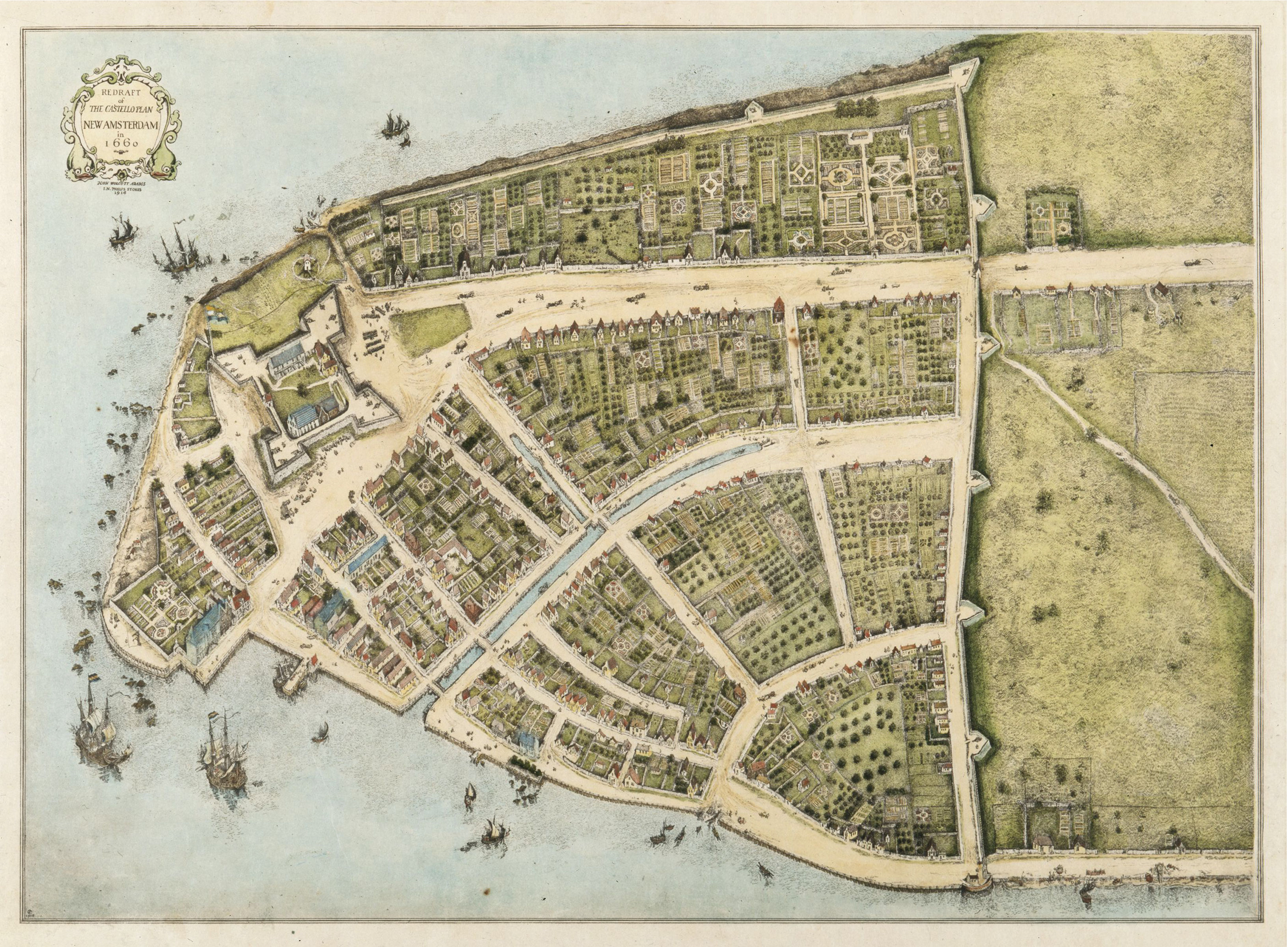
New Amsterdam, 1660: early East River docks along left bottom; protective wall against the British on right. West is at top. (Castello Plan redraft)

The original population of the 16th century New York Harbor, the Lenape, used the waterways for fishing and travel. In 1524 Giovanni da Verrazzano anchored in what is now called the Narrows, the strait between Staten Island and Long Island that connects the Upper and Lower New York Bay, where he received a canoe party of Lenape. A party of his sailors may have taken on fresh water at a spring called "the watering place" on Staten Island—a monument stands in a tiny park on the corner of Bay Street and Victory Boulevard at the approximate spot—but Verrazzano's descriptions of the geography of the area are a bit ambiguous. It is fairly firmly held by historians that his ship anchored at the approximate location of the modern Verrazzano–Narrows Bridge's approach viaduct in Brooklyn. He also observed what he believed to be a large freshwater lake to the north (apparently Upper New York Bay). He apparently did not travel north to observe the existence of the Hudson River. In 1609 Henry Hudson entered the harbor and explored a stretch of the river that now bears his name. His journey prompted others to explore the region and engage in trade with the local population.

The first permanent European settlement was started on Governors Island in 1624, and in Brooklyn eight years after that; soon these were connected by ferry operation. Peter Stuyvesant, the Dutch colonial director-general of New Netherland, ordered construction of the first wharf on the Manhattan bank of the lower East River sheltered from winds and ice, which was completed late in 1648 and called Schreyers Hook Dock (near what is now Pearl and Broad Streets). This prepared New York as a leading port for the British colonies and then within the newly independent United States.

In 1686, the British colonial officials gave the municipality control over the waterfront.

=== 19th century ===
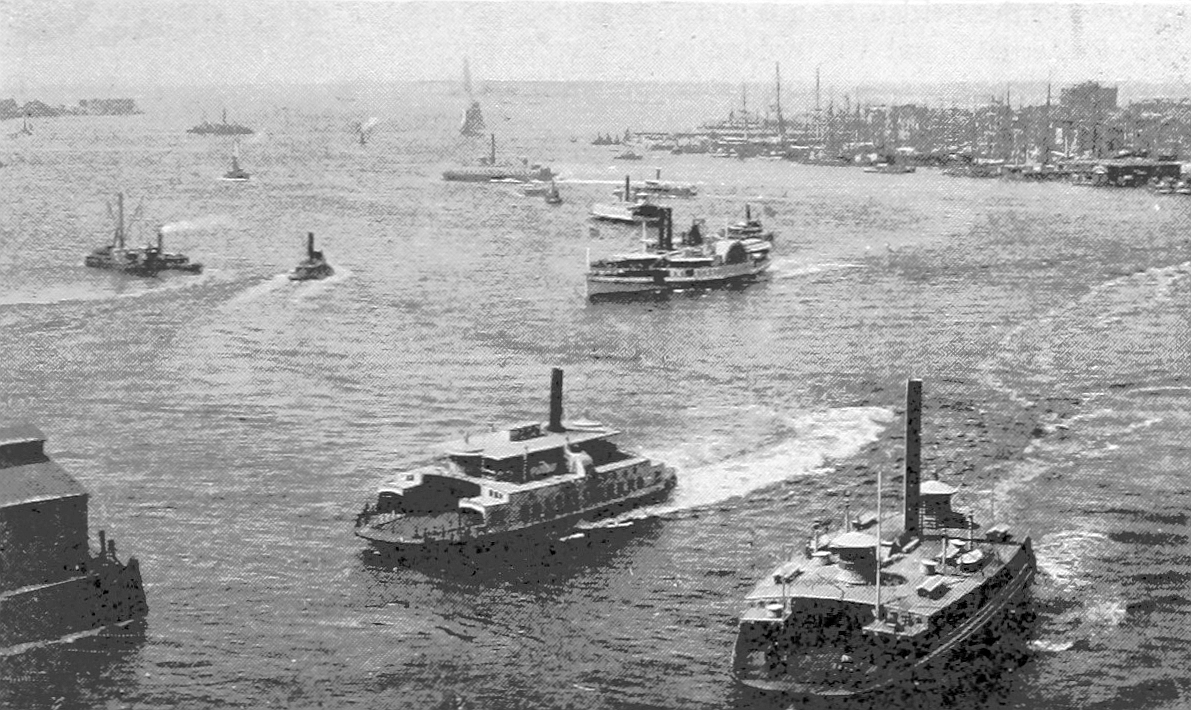
New York Harbor seen from the Brooklyn Bridge in 1893

In 1835, Lieutenant Thomas Gedney of the Survey of the Coast (renamed the United States Coast Survey in 1836 and the United States Coast and Geodetic Survey in 1878) discovered a new, deeper channel through the Narrows into New York Harbor. Previously, the passage was complex and shallow enough that loaded ships would wait outside the harbor until high tide, to avoid running into the huge sandbar, which was interrupted in a number of places by channels of fairly shallow depth: 21 feet (6.4 m) at low tide and 33 feet (10 m) at high tide. Because of the difficulty of the navigation required, since 1694, New York had required all ships to be guided into the harbor by an experienced pilot. The new channel Gedney discovered was 2 feet (0.61 m) deeper, enough of an added margin that fully laden ships could come into the harbor even at slack tide. Gedney's Channel, as it came to be called, was also shorter than the previous channel, another benefit appreciated by the ship owners and the merchants they sold to. Gedney received the praise of the city, as well as an expensive silver service.

In her 1832 book Domestic Manners of the Americans, Fanny Trollope wrote of her impressions upon entering New York Harbor for the first time:

I have never seen the bay of Naples, I can therefore make no comparison, but my imagination is incapable of conceiving any thing of the kind more beautiful than the harbour of New York. Various and lovely are the objects which meet the eye on every side, but the naming them would only be to give a list of words, without conveying the faintest idea of the scene. I doubt if ever the pencil of Turner could do it justice, bright and glorious as it rose upon us. We seemed to enter the harbour of New York upon waves of liquid gold, and as we darted past the green isles which rise from its bosom, like guardian centinels of the fair city, the setting sun stretched his horizontal beams farther and farther at each moment, as if to point out to us some new glory in the landscape.

In 1824 the first American drydock was completed on the East River. Because of its location and depth, the Port grew rapidly with the introduction of steamships; and then with the completion in 1825 of the Erie Canal New York became the most important transshipping port between Europe and the interior of the United States, as well as coastwise destinations. By about 1840, more passengers and a greater tonnage of cargo came through the port of New York than all other major harbors in the country combined and by 1900 it was one of the great international ports. The Morris Canal carried anthracite and freight from Pennsylvania through New Jersey to its terminus at the mouth of the Hudson in Jersey City. Portions in the harbor are now part of Liberty State Park.

In 1870, the city established the Department of Docks to systematize waterfront development, with George B. McClellan as the first engineer in chief. By the turn of the 20th century numerous railroad terminals lined the western banks of the North River (Hudson River) in Hudson County, New Jersey, transporting passengers and freight from all over the United States. The freight was ferried across by the competing railroads with small fleets of towboats, barges, and 323 car floats, specially designed barges with rails so cars could be rolled on. New York subsidized this service which undercut rival ports. Major road improvements allowing for trucking and containerization diminished the need.

The harbor saw major federal investment at the end of the century when Congress passed the Rivers and Harbors Act of 1899. Over $1.2 million of initial funding was appropriated for the dredging of 40-foot-deep (12.2 m) channels at Bay Ridge, Red Hook, and Sandy Hook.

The Statue of Liberty (Liberty Enlightening the World) stands on Liberty Island in the harbor, while the nearby main port of entry at Ellis Island processed 12 million arrivals from 1892 to 1954. The Statue of Liberty National Monument, encompassing both islands, recalls the period of massive immigration to the United States at the turn of the 20th century While many stayed in the region, others spread across America, with more than 10 million leaving from the nearby Central Railroad of New Jersey Terminal.

=== 20th century ===
==== Post–World War I ====
After the war, the 1919 New York City Harbor Strike by the Marine Workers Union shut down the port for weeks.

It started on January 9 and was paused on January 13 for arbitration. The strike resumed March 4 after workers rejected the War Board labor ruling and ended on April 20, 1919, after new terms had been offered by both public and private port employers.

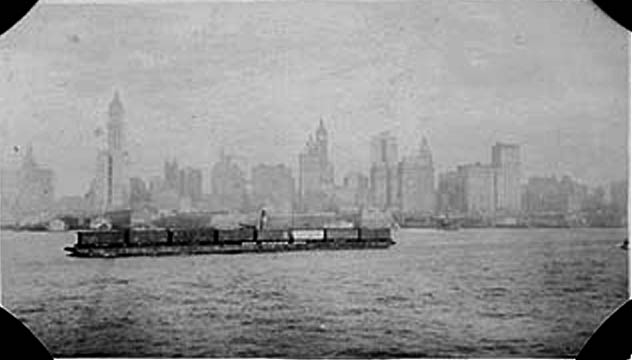
A U.S. sailor's album snapshot of a railroad car float in NY Harbor in 1919

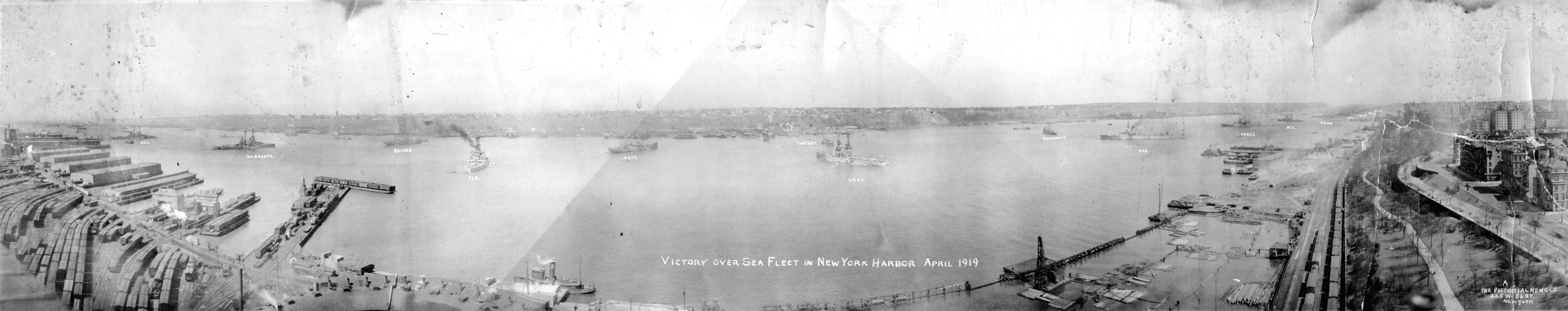
World War I victory fleet of battleships in New York Harbor in April 1919

==== World War II ====
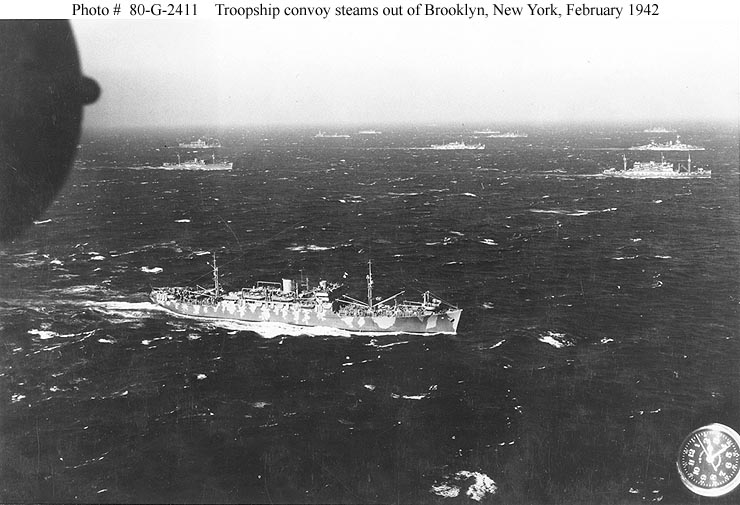
Convoy out of Brooklyn in February 1942 bound for Liverpool (photographed from a blimp from NAS Lakehurst)

After the United States entered World War II, the German navy's Operation Drumbeat set the top U-boat aces loose against the merchant fleet in U.S. territorial waters in January 1942, starting the Second happy time. The U-boat captains were able to silhouette target ships against the glow of city lights, and attacked with relative impunity, in spite of U.S. naval concentrations within the harbor. Casualties included the tankers Coimbria off Sandy Hook and Norness off Long Island. New York Harbor, as the major convoy embarkation point for the U.S., was effectively a staging area in the Battle of the Atlantic, with the U.S. Merchant Marine losses of 1 of 26 mariners, a rate exceeding those of the other U.S. forces.

Bright city lights made it easier for German U-boats to spot targets at night, but local officials resisted suggestions that they follow London's lead and blackout the lights of coastal cities. However, some lights were darkened, including those of the amusement parks in Coney Island, Brooklyn, and the Coney Island Light, and Sandy Hook Lighthouse.

The harbor reached its peak activity in March 1943 during World War II, with 543 ships at anchor awaiting assignment to convoy or berthing (with as many as 426 seagoing vessel already at one of the 750 piers or docks). Eleven hundred warehouses with nearly 1.5 square miles (3.9 km^{2}) of enclosed space served freight along with 575 tugboats and 39 active shipyards, the largest being Brooklyn Navy Yard. With a large inventory of heavy equipment, this made New York Harbor the busiest in the world.

==== Post–World War II ====
Deterrence and investigation of criminal activity, especially relating to organized crime, is the responsibility of the bi-state Waterfront Commission. The commission was set up in 1953 (a year before the movie On the Waterfront), to combat labor racketeering. It is held that the Gambino crime family controlled the New York waterfront and the Genovese crime family controlled the New Jersey side. In 1984 the Teamsters local was put under Racketeer Influenced and Corrupt Organizations Act (RICO) trusteeship, and in 2005 a similar suit was brought against the International Longshoremen's Association local.

In March 2006, the Port passenger facility was to be transferred to Dubai Ports World. There was considerable security controversy over the ownership by a foreign corporation, particularly Arabic, of a U.S. port operation, this in spite of the fact the current operator was the British-based P&O Ports, and the fact that Orient Overseas Investment Limited, a company dominated by a Chinese Communist official, has the operating contract for Howland Hook Marine Terminal. An additional concern is the U.S. Customs "green lane" program, in which trusted shippers have fewer containers inspected, providing easier access for contraband material.

== Water quality ==
The water quality in New York Harbor has been affected by centuries of shipping activity, industrial development and urbanization. Water pollution from these sources has been a constant phenomenon, although there have been improvements in some areas of the harbor complex in the late 20th and early 21st centuries. A 2019 study of the harbor identifies water quality trends in nine regions of the harbor, using data collected during 1996 to 2017. The Lower New York Bay region has the highest quality, due to frequent exchange of water with the Atlantic Ocean. The poorest regions are those with limited exchange of water flows: Newtown Creek, Flushing Bay and Jamaica Bay. High levels of nutrient pollution (nitrogen and phosphorus) were observed throughout the various harbor regions, although there has been a general lowering trend in total nitrogen, and some other indicator parameters show improvements. The implementation of the Clean Water Act and related pollution control laws, along with cleanup programs and conservation measures throughout the region, have begun to yield some improvements since the 1970s. The study authors state that "the New York Harbor ecosystem is much healthier than it was 30 years ago."

== Container shipping and air travel ==
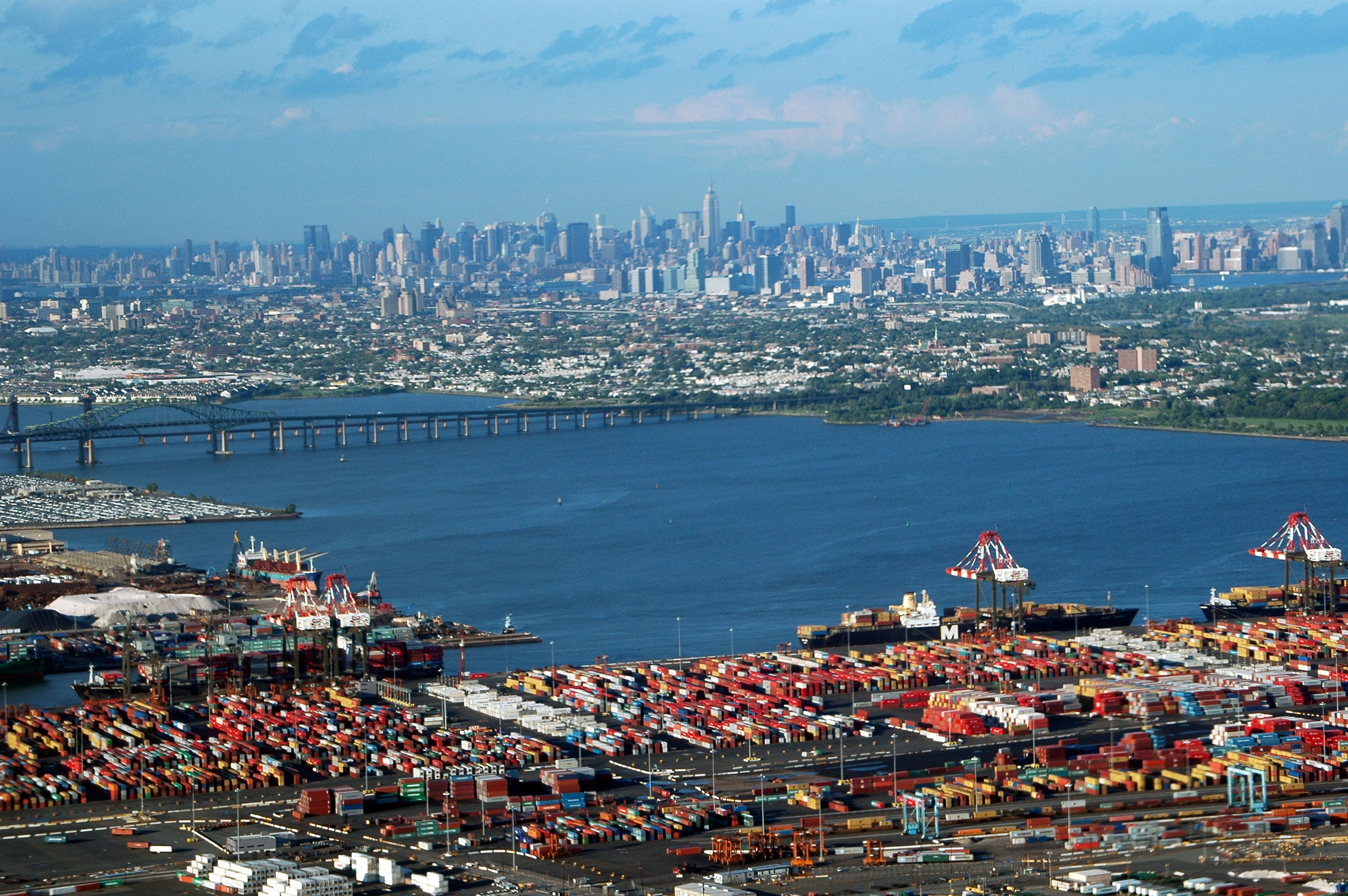
Port Newark seen in the foreground from across Newark Bay

The Port of New York and New Jersey is the largest oil importing port and third largest container port in the nation. The commercial activity of the port of New York City, including the waterfronts of the five boroughs and nearby cities in New Jersey, since 1921 has been formalized under a single bi-state Port Authority of New York and New Jersey. Since the 1950s, the New York and Brooklyn commercial port has been almost completely eclipsed by the container ship facility at nearby Port Newark-Elizabeth Marine Terminal in Newark Bay, which is the largest such port on the Eastern Seaboard. The port has diminished in importance to passenger travel, but the Port Authority operates all three major airports, La Guardia (built 1939) and JFK/Idlewild (built 1948) in New York, and Newark (built 1928) in New Jersey.

== Ferries and cruise ships ==
The harbor is still served by cruise lines, commuter ferries, and tourist excursion boats. Although most ferry service is private, the Staten Island Ferry is operated by the New York City Department of Transportation. Passenger ship facilities are New York Passenger Ship Terminal, the Brooklyn Cruise Terminal at Red Hook, and MOTBY at Bayonne.

== Gallery ==
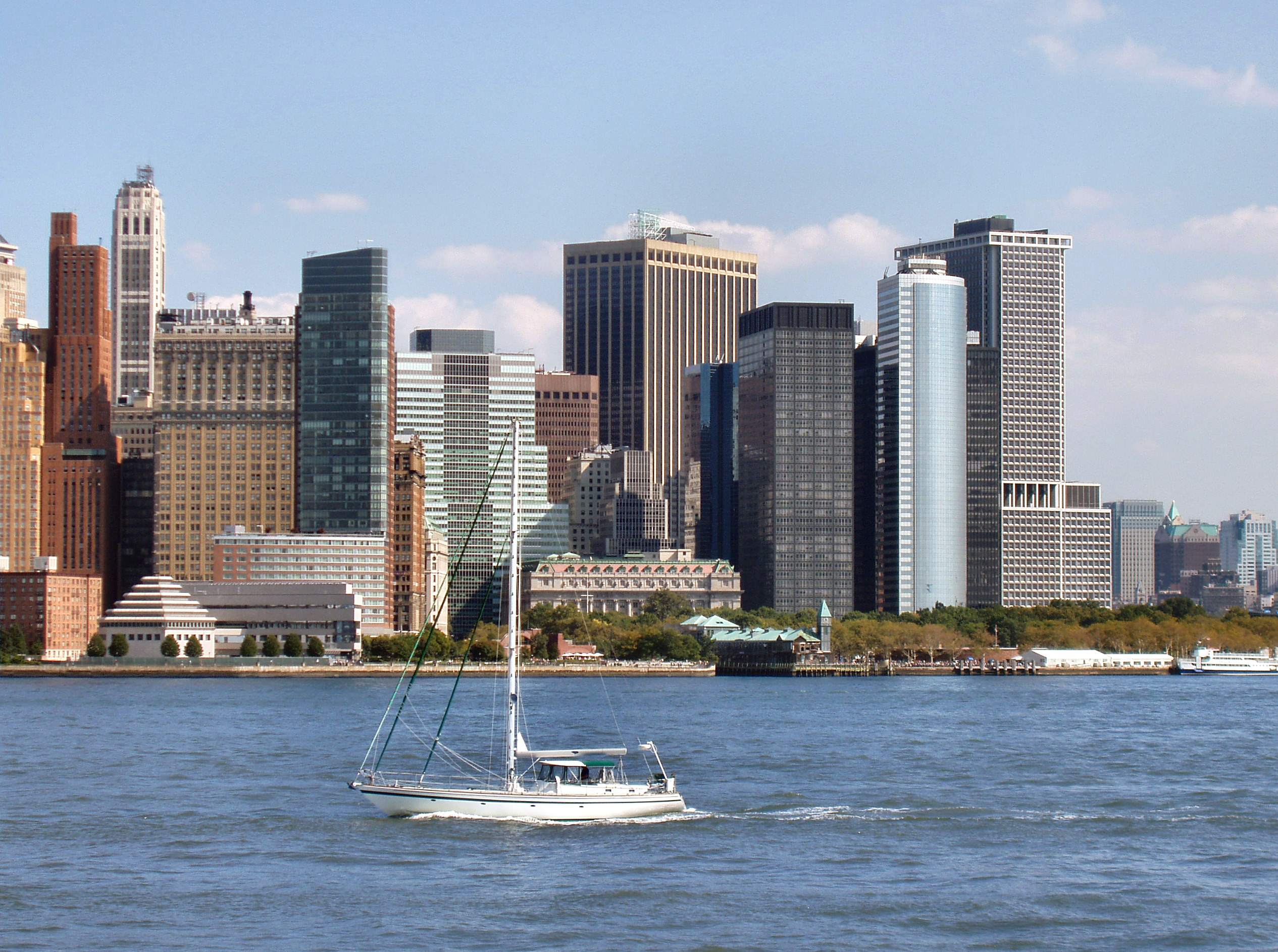
Manhattan, across the bay from Liberty State Park

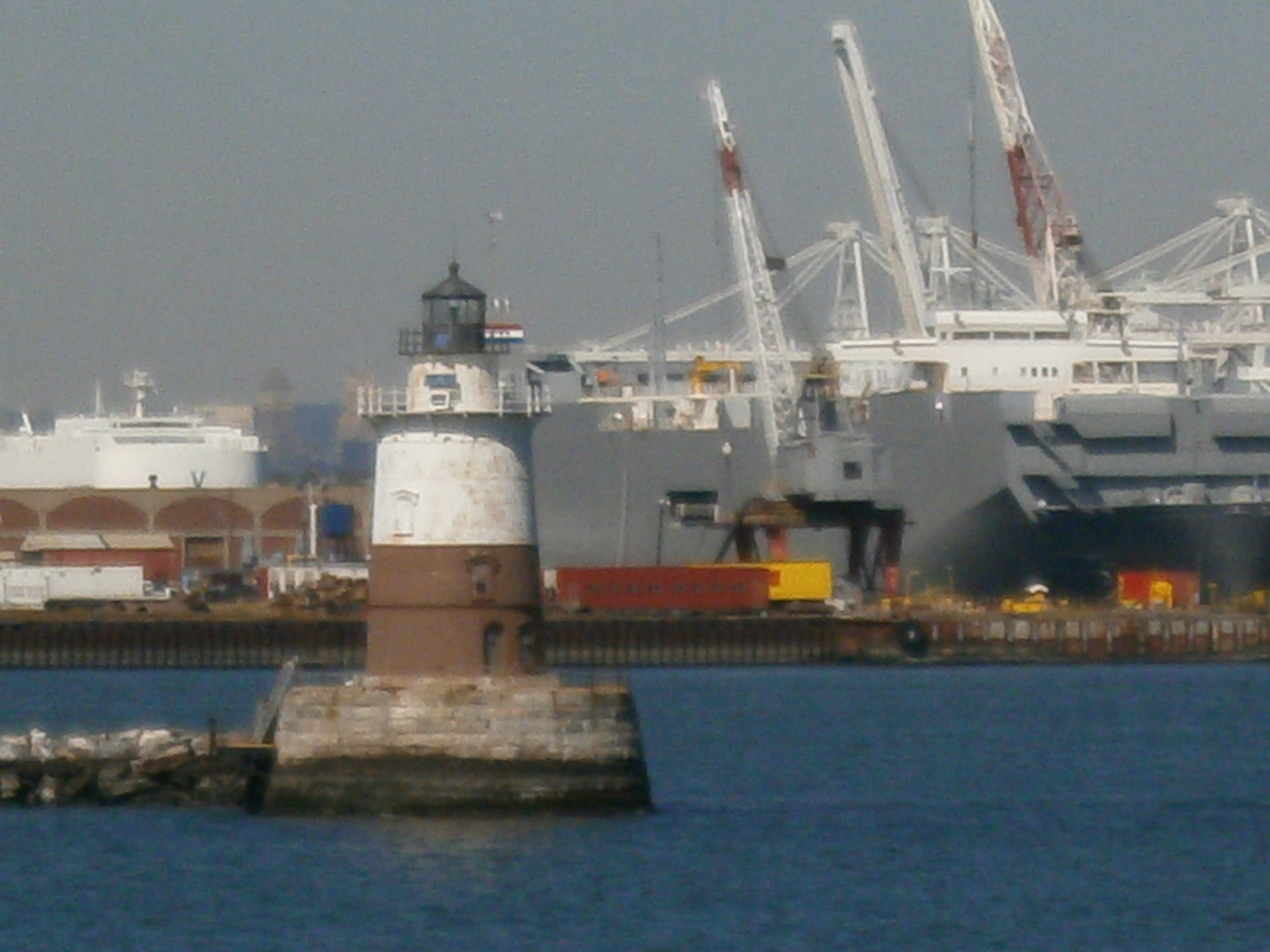
Robbins Reef Light, MOTBY, and Port Jersey

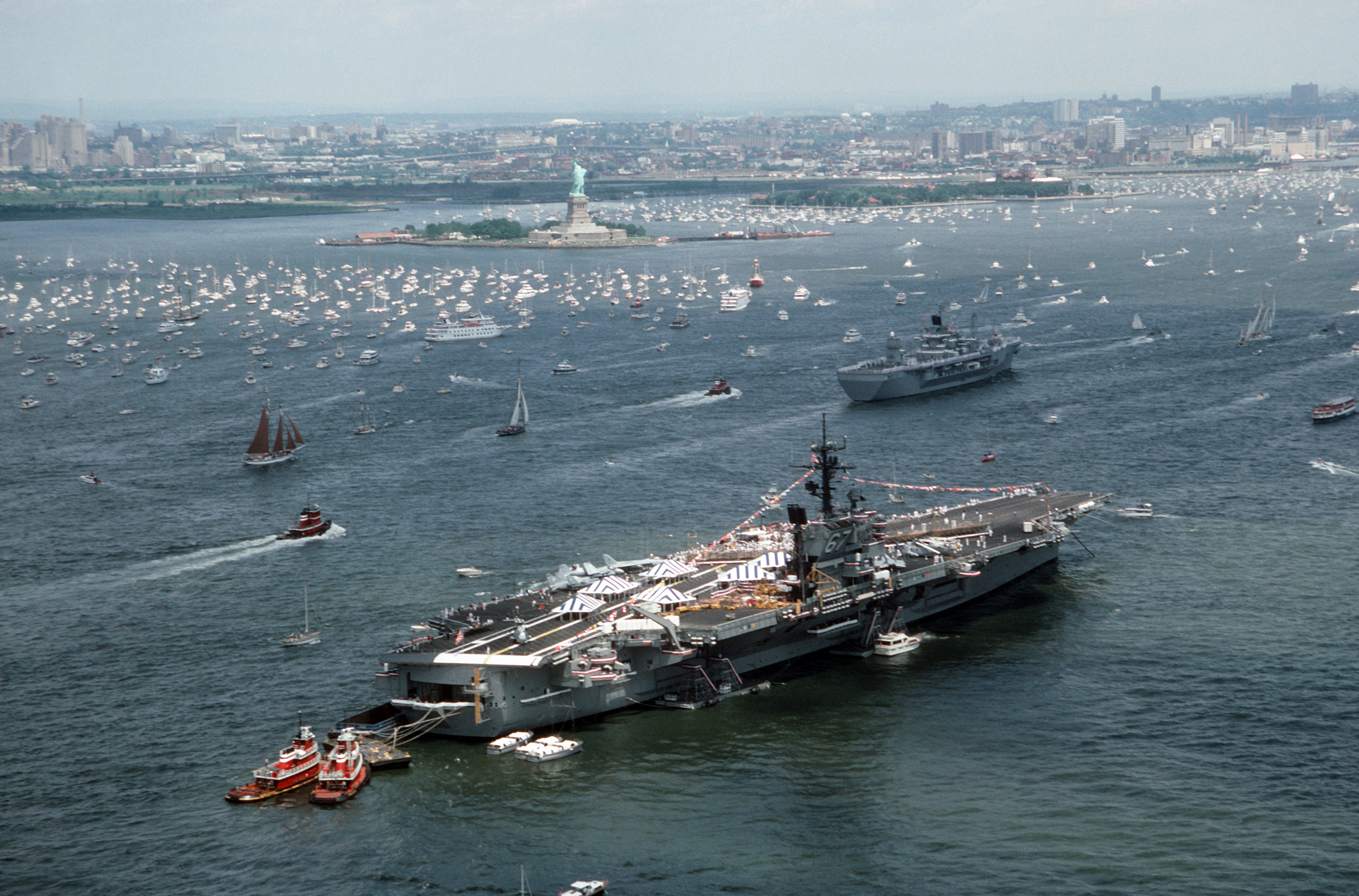
Liberty Weekend 1986

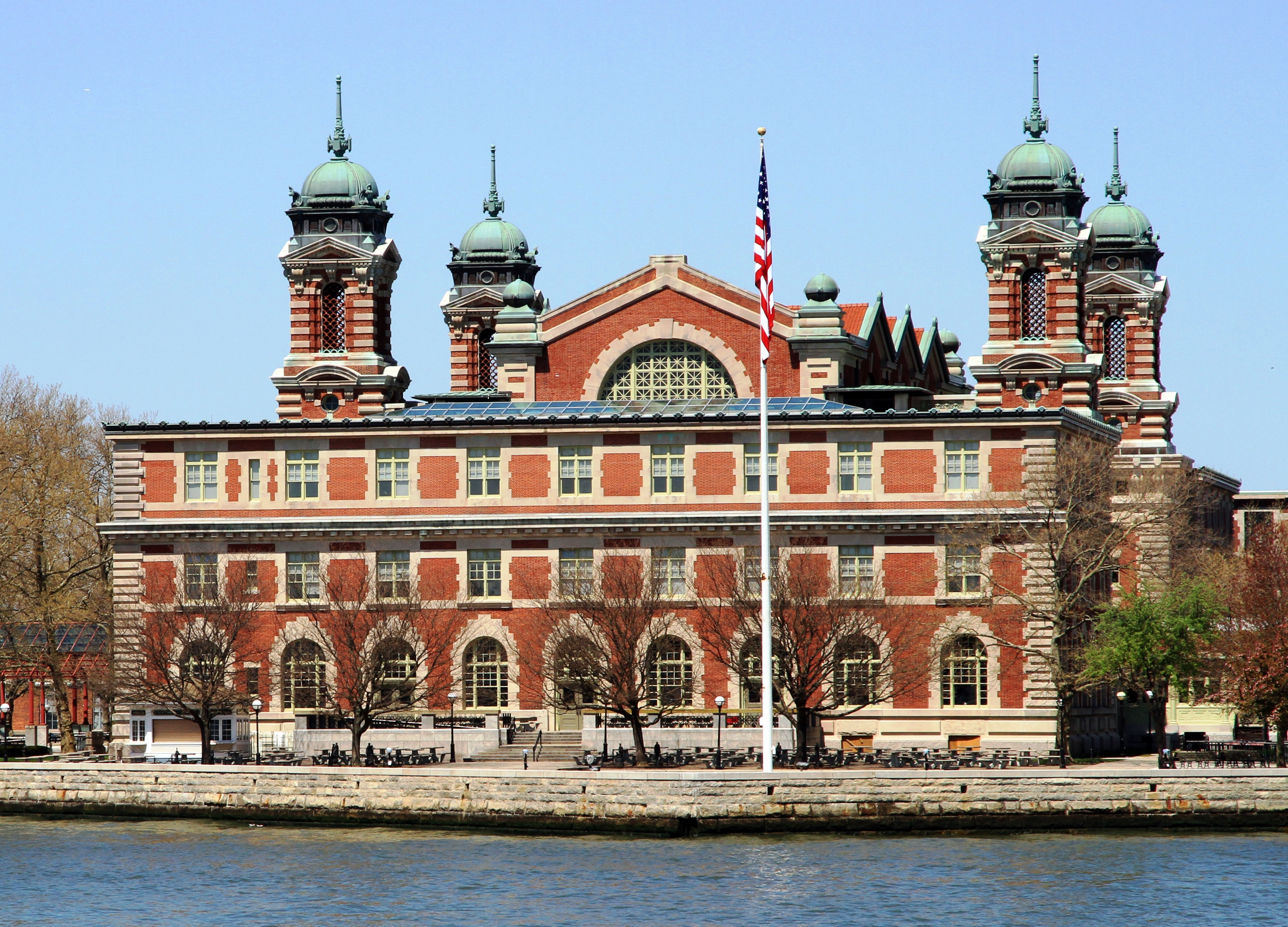
Ellis Island

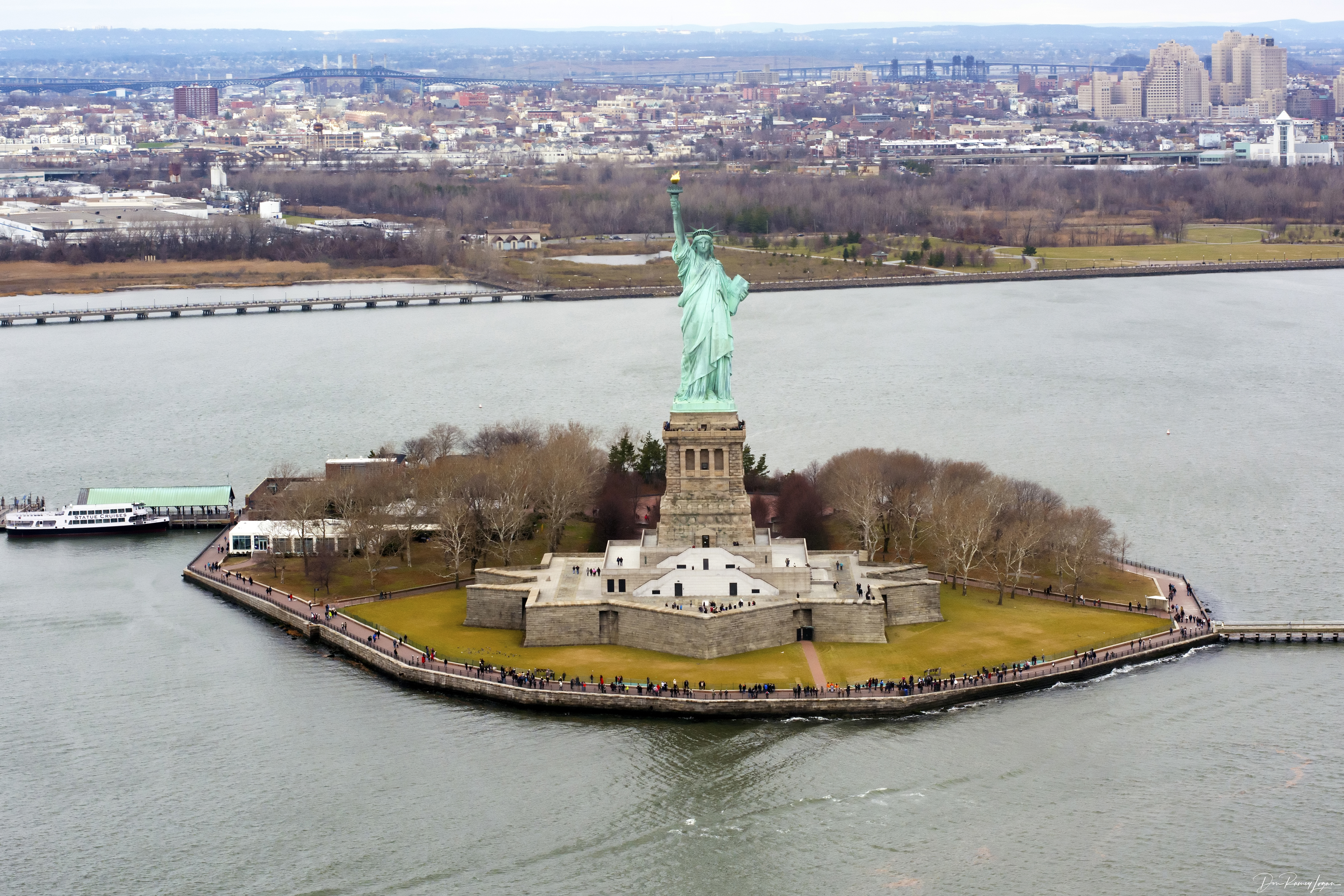
The Statue of Liberty

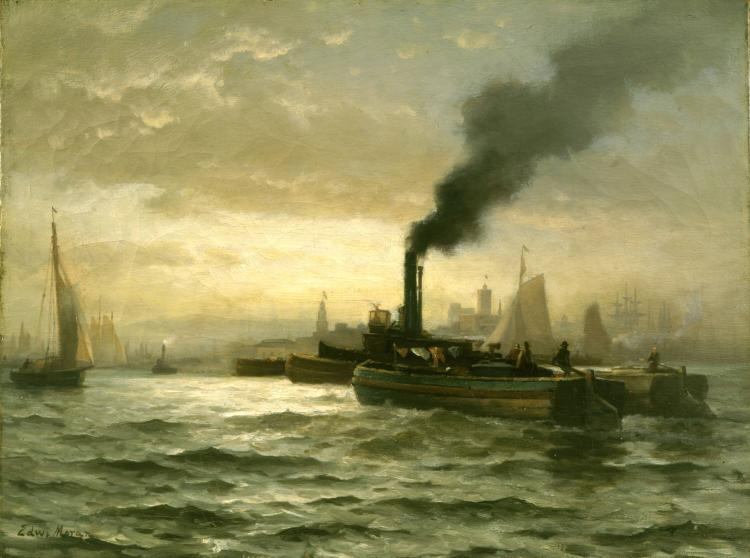
Edward Moran, New York Harbor, 1880

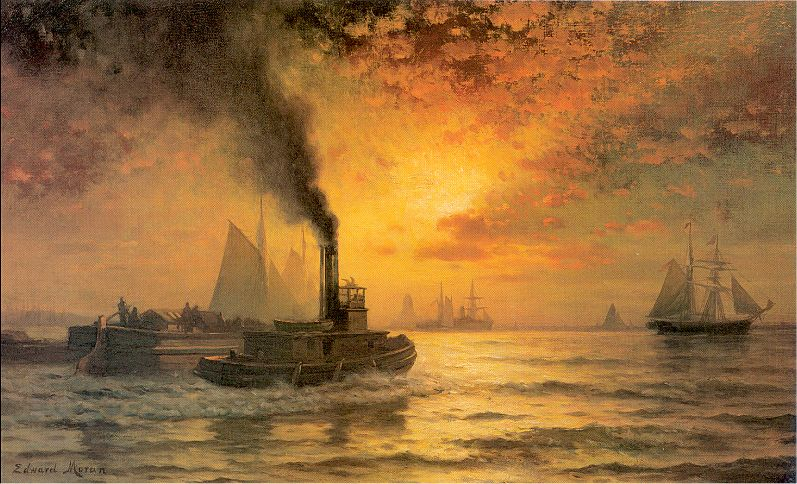
Edward Moran, New York Harbor

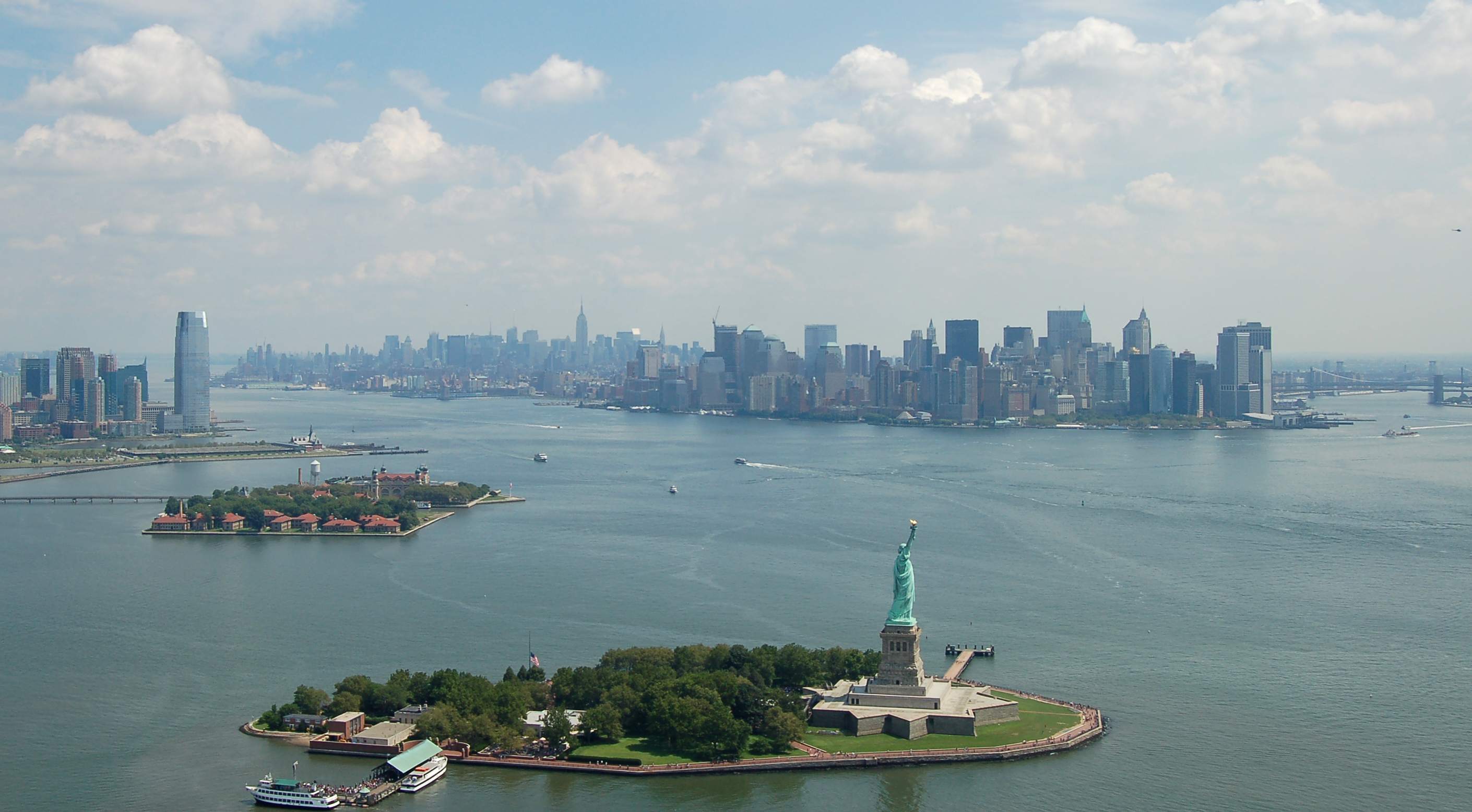
Liberty Island, with Ellis Island, downtown Jersey City (left), and Manhattan (right) in background

== See also ==
- Brooklyn Army Terminal
- Commissioner of Docks and Ferries of the City of New York
- Geography of New York-New Jersey Harbor Estuary
- History of New York City transportation
- Marine life of New York-New Jersey Harbor Estuary
- Military Ocean Terminal at Bayonne
- New York Harbor Storm-Surge Barrier
