= Alex Shandrowsky =

American labor leader

Alexander A. Shandrowsky (born August 1, 1950) is an American former labor union leader from Baltimore. He was elected President of the Marine Engineers' Beneficial Association, AFL-CIO in 1995 and served in that position until 1998.

== Sources ==
- Fairplay, Fairplay Publications Ltd. (1997) p. 15
- Famighetti, Robert (ed). World Almanac and Book of Facts. World Almanac Books (1999) p. 153. ISBN 0-88687-832-2
