= American Society of Marine Engineers =

American maritime company union

- Abbreviation: ASME
- Predecessor: None
- Successor: None
- Formation: 1921
- Dissolved: ca. 1941
- Type: Company union
- Services: Labor agency; Education; Industry standards
- Members: 800 (claimed) (1934)
- Main organ: The Log

The American Society of Marine Engineers (abbr: ASME) was a company union established by shipowners in 1921 to supplant or weaken the chief labor union of American marine engineers, the Marine Engineers' Beneficial Association (MEBA). The ASME enjoyed some success for a number of years after the failed MEBA strike of 1921, but was effectively eliminated as a competitor to MEBA following the successful "Big Strike" of 1934.

The ASME also served as an educational organization, and continued publishing its official organ, The Log, until 1941.

== Background ==
During World War I, the United States merchant navy underwent a great expansion, leading to a shortage of qualified marine engineers, which in turn led to an increase in wages. The situation was reversed in the postwar period, with a surplus of engineers seeking a reduced number of jobs. In 1921, shipowners attempted to take advantage of these conditions by reducing wages, in response to which, the chief trade union representing American marine engineers, the Marine Engineers' Beneficial Association (MEBA), went on strike. With the union unable to exert leverage due to the high number of unemployed in the industry, the strike was a disastrous failure for MEBA, which lost half its membership in the aftermath. (Note: Membership in MEBA fell from a high of 22,528 in January 1921 to 11,000 by 1923. Shortly before the successful strike of 1934, the union's membership had fallen to an all-time low of 4,848.)

In the wake of the failed strike, shipowners sought to consolidate their victory over MEBA by establishing a number of company unions to replace it. The most important of these was the American Society of Marine Engineers (ASME).

== History and description ==
The American Society of Marine Engineers was established in San Francisco, California, in 1921. A tenet of its constitution was to avoid affiliation with organized labor groups, such as the American Federation of Labor. The ostensible reason for this avoidance was given as "the fact that the operating marine engineer ... is entrusted with valuable property and with the maintenance of discipline upon which the safety of that property and also the safety of many lives may depend."

The ASME did not concern itself with the working conditions or wages of its members, or with improving their material condition, as a result of which, it was not considered a bona fide labor union by the federal government. Because of the failed 1921 strike, however, many marine engineers were nonetheless compelled to resign from MEBA and join ASME as a condition for obtaining employment in the industry.

In addition to its other activities, the ASME also worked to improve professional standards and methods within the profession, and on influencing legislation dealing with it. An auxiliary membership was made available to machinists, who could improve their knowledge with free access to the Society's extensive library of marine engineering textbooks in preparation for licence examinations. Auxiliary members were also assisted in gaining work experience aboard ships. Free weekly lectures on marine engineering topics were organized, and published in the Society's weekly journal, The Log. By 1934, the Society claimed a membership of 800.

=== Demise ===
On 9 May 1934, the International Longshoremen's Association went on strike, and was joined on 15 May by the Sailor's Union on the Pacific. The Marine Engineers' Beneficial Association, "on the verge of extinction and with nothing to lose", (Note: Quote from De La Pedraja.) joined the "Big Strike" on the 19th. This time, the strike was successful, with the shipowners' associations agreeing to recognize and negotiate with MEBA. As a result of the union victory, membership in the ASME collapsed virtually overnight, with most of its members flocking back to MEBA. The ASME's activities were further restricted in 1935 by the National Labor Relations Act, which outlawed company unions.

The ASME continued to engage in educational activities, publishing its official organ The Log until 1941, when the magazine was sold to Miller Freeman Publications. In January 1951, The Log incorporated another magazine, Pacific Marine Review. The Log ceased publication in 1956.
