= Background and causes of the Malayan Emergency =

Background and Causes of National Liberation War

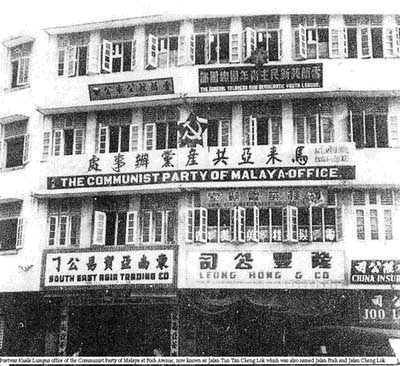
Headquarters of the Communist Party of Malaya in Kuala Lumpur, 1948.

In 1948, the Communists and the British colonial government in Malaya entered a period of guerrilla fighting which has become known to history as the Malayan Emergency.

The name derives from the state of emergency declared by the colonial administration in June 1948 to extend the powers of the police and military. The state of emergency was officially lifted in July 1960.

In the broadest context, the events leading to the emergency include the following:

- The establishment of British hegemony over Malaya in the 19th century.
- The importation of large numbers of Chinese and Indians as labourers for colonial industry, primarily tin mining and rubber planting.
- The formation of the Malayan Communist Party (MCP) in the 1930s.
- The rout by the Japanese of the British in the early part of World War II. For many Malayans this dispelled a myth of British omnipotence.
- The rise of the MCP-led Malayan Peoples' Anti-Japanese Army (MPAJA) as the main resistance against the Japanese during their period of occupation.

This article focuses on the immediate antecedents to the Emergency, beginning shortly after the Japanese surrender and British reoccupation in August and September 1945.

== Labour unions ==
In September to December 1945, General Labour Unions (GLU's) arose, sometimes with MCP guidance. They organised themselves as regional bodies rather than trade-specific bodies; this was consciously done in an effort to promote racial integration since particular racial groups tended to predominate in particular trades, e.g.; Chinese in mines, Malays in the civil service, often Indians on plantations.

A number of short strikes were held, not necessarily involving entire GLU's. They had little material result but demonstrated a capacity to act.

There were considerable economic grounds for labour unrest. Real wages were below the pre-war level in 1948 compared to 1939 wages had risen about 3 times but the cost of living had gone up 4 times, so the real wage was about 3/4.

Normal pre-war rice consumption had been 1 1/4 to 1 1/2 pounds (570 to 680 g) per day. In April 1946 the rice ration in Singapore for an adult male was reduced from 4 to 3 pounds (1.8 to 1.4 kg) per week; in mid-August it was further reduced to 1 2/3 pounds (760 g) per week, where it remained until an increase in December.

The Annual Report of the Colony of Singapore for 1946 reported that the majority of infant deaths were due to rice shortage and lack of proper food.

A survey of working-class families in the Report for 1947 found that only 22% of them had sufficient food energy in their diets and that 30 to 40% of the children suffered from malnutrition. In its internal reports in 1945 the British administration recognised the tendency of such conditions to produce unrest, and stated that the strikes were motivated by economic conditions rather than a political programme.

. . . the main cause of the recent disturbances is the lack of rice.

— Strikes and Disturbances in Malaya.,

When our allotment of rice for December and January was substantially reduced, we found ourselves in a serious predicament. To have distributed the rice equitably throughout the whole country would have entailed a substantial reduction of the ration in Singapore as well as throughout the Mainland. From every point of view, however, we had to safeguard the position in Singapore.

The political repercussions of such an announcement would we knew be serious, and our problem was to redistribute rice on such a basis as would minimise the unrest and disorder which it was only reasonable to expect would follow the new announcement ...

Singapore mishandled could paralyse the whole country, and ... could seriously hamper our military operations in Java.

— British Military Administration (BMA) report, December 1945.,

On account of the political situation existing in neighbouring countries it was always possible that the strikes would take a 'political' turn and it is even surprising in retrospect,

that considerations of this kind played such a comparatively small part. As to the economic grounds for the strike there was never any doubt. The cost of living has risen out of all proportion to the level of wages so much so that the strikers' demands were first and foremost for an increased rice ration and only secondly for increased pay.

The causes of the unrest are thus primarily economic.

— BMA report, December 1945.,

Nevertheless, the British administration was not tolerant of the disturbances.

Arrest all picketers.

— BMA order, Oct 27, 1945, regarding Singapore dockworkers' strike.,

There have been a few major incidents in the country towns necessitating shooting on a very small scale and this had had a most salutary effect. . . . 50,000 tons of rice would go far towards a solution (and arrests on a larger scale).

— Military telegram, 29 October 1945,

In October 1945 the Chinese-language newspapers Shih Tai Jit Pao and Pai Ma Tao Pao were closed and their editors and staffs convicted and imprisoned for sedition because of their use of the term "economic exploitation".

A large strike, peaking at 18,000 workers on 17 December, broke out in Singapore. At that point, some members of the administration began taking the position that the strikes are political, not economic.

the reasons for this strike are purely political. There is no question at all of wages or conditions of labour. The leaders of the General Labour Union (GLU) and other Associations cannot, in my opinion be regarded as Trade Union leaders in any real sense. They are purely political leaders attempting to subvert the law and bring the British Military Administration into hatred and contempt.

— Statement by a BMA official (V. Purcell), referred to by Admiral Mountbatten at Supreme Allied Commander's meeting, Singapore, 9 January 1946.,

Historian Daud Latiff argues that the British were restrained from taking even harder measures against the strikes at this stage for two reasons:

1. The MPAJA had not yet been disbanded, still had its weapons, and could pose an enormous problem if provoked into rebellion.
2. In the changed political climate at the end of World War II, actions which could be viewed as repressive or fascistic might cause large public relations problems, or damage Britain's international image at a time when she was in competition with the United States for global political allegiances.

If we arrest a few [dissidents] now we shall probably provoke retaliation

which will enable us to arrest many more, but it will be a sort of running battle which will lay us open to misrepresentation both in this country and in the world.

It will look like an aggressive act during a period of comparative peace. It seems to me that if we are content to wait a little longer another opportunity will come, not perhaps as good as the last one, but still good enough to enable us to take the most widespread and effective action without fear of adverse public opinion.

— Mountbatten, 9 Jan 1946,

== Protest and strike ==
Beginning on 29 January 1946, a large strike occurred, centred around Singapore. It was largely in protest over the arrest and conviction (after two acquittals) of the former head of the Selangor section of the MPAJA, Soon Kwong, for punishing a Japanese collaborator on 10 September 1945, when the MPAJA was still in partial control of the country.

150,000 to 200,000 workers walked off the job; by the 31st Singapore was at a "standstill"; Soon Kwong was released on 3 February.

A large demonstration was called for 15 February 1946, the fourth anniversary of the fall of Singapore. The organisers claimed that it was in memorial to the thousands of Malayans who had fallen in the defence of Singapore or been executed by the Japanese in the three weeks after that; but the authorities felt that it was an impertinent celebration of Britain's embarrassing defeat. They banned the demonstrations and on 14 February arrested 24 leading activists and placed them under deportation orders. On the 15th, demonstrators were confronted by troops who killed one and wounded 17 in Singapore and killed 17 in Johore.

Also in February, labour set up a country-wide organisation called the Pan Malayan General Labour Union (PMGLU). Over the ensuing 12 months there was a rapid expansion of trade unionism throughout Malaya, with the PMGLU as the guiding force; by April 1947 the PMGLU had a membership of 263,598—over half the total work force—and encompassed 85% of the individual trade unions. The attitude of the Malayan worker became more assertive during this period; for instance, "A strike was reported of Chinese and Indian hospital workers because they no longer wanted to be addressed as 'boy' ....", and workers began to see their subjection to physical punishments as unacceptable. Historian T. N. Harper writes of the period:

Union organisation developed a spontaneous momentum from below.

Indian Labour Unions appeared in the localities. Ex-INA Indian National Army men led these organisations in many States, although there were exceptions to this. The Indian Labour Union in Kedah was led by a driver and coffeeshop owner, A. M. Samy, whose earlier connection with the INA was less pronounced. He exercised dominance over large areas of the State through a thondar pedai, a militant Dravidian youth militia, that enforced strike action and picketed toddy shops.

Thondar pedai-style movements were a feature of Indian Labour Unions elsewhere; for example, in the Johore Bahru division of the Rubber Workers' Union thondar pedai orderlies wearing red arm bands organised meetings, and members subscribed a dollar a month to support the organisation.

Some of the Indian Labour Unions became affiliated with the PMGLU, others did not—most notably P. P. Narayanan's Negri Sembilan Estate Indian Workers' Union, which opted to remain a communal entity to fight the pay differential between Chinese and Indian workers. The period saw a considerable upsurge in the number of strikes: in March 1946 the docks and tin smelter at Penang were "paralysed"; in April a railway strike began which lasted several weeks; there was striking among Indian plantation labourers along the entire west coast of the peninsula; and unrest continued in Singapore. The journal British Malaya wrote in September 1946 that "there have been an average of 27 strikes a week for the last seven weeks ...." Between April 1946 and March 1947, 713,000 worker days, or 2 per employee, were lost to strikes in Malaya, and in Singapore, 1,173,000 worker days, ten per employee, were lost.

The government countered this movement by changing some of thelaws and regulations on trade union activity, and resuming the enforcement of others that had been left in abeyance after the war.

By, at latest, early 1947, the ordinary trespassing law was being used to keep union organisers from addressing the workers on plantations. For instance in late March 1947, a large police force came to the Dublin estate in Kedah to arrest a Federation of Trades Unions official for trespassing as he was speaking to a group of workers there.

When the workers closed ranks around the official to protect him the police opened fire, killing one worker and wounding five.

Incidents such as this demonstrate that the situation was already somewhat revolutionary in that the workers were disputing, at least to some extent, the rights of private property, and the establishment was willing to use severe measures against them. Indeed, among Indian estate labour in Kedah in early 1947 there appears to have been something almost akin to the formation of soviets:

The situation throughout February was that labourers were virtually in control of many of the estates and there seems to have been an almost complete breakdown in managerial authority. Labourers began taking over estates and managers were forced to retreat to the safety of neighbouring towns.

In a clash at the Bedong estate on 3 March 1947, 21 labourers were injured; "the strike leader died of injuries received at the hands of the police a few days later"; 61 were sentenced to six months' imprisonment.

The 1940 Trade Union Ordinance required that unions in Malaya (unlike those in Britain) be registered, which meant that they had to open their books and other processes to inspection by government officers. The registration provisions were not initially enforced after World War II but beginning around the time that the civil administration (Malayan Union) took over from the British Military Administration (BMA) in April 1946, moves were made to require trade unions to register.

The registration rules were somewhat restrictive; for instance government employees and non-government employees could not belong to the same union or even to unions affiliated with each other, and union funds could not be used for political purposes. Under these rules the GLU's were un-registerable and therefore could not operate legally.

The Singapore GLU (SGLU) reached an accommodation with the Trade Union Adviser in Singapore, S.P. Garrett, whereby it could reorganise as a Federation (not a union) and operate legally without registering. Accordingly, the SGLU became the Singapore Federation of Trade Unions (SFTU) in August 1946 and was (temporarily) safe from the law.

Shortly afterwards (25 August) the PMGLU on the peninsula, hoping for a similar application of the rules, reorganised itself as the Pan Malayan Federation of Trade Unions (PMFTU). However, the Trade Union Adviser in Malaya, John Brazier, was less sympathetic than Garrett and he and the registrar, Mr. Prentiss, quickly thwarted this move by ruling that all of the Federation's branch unions, which had to register, could not accept the guidance of any non-registered entity, and could not remit a portion of their funds to a federation or use funds for sympathy strikes. This left the PMFTU and its affiliates in legal quicksand, although no moves were taken yet to prosecute them.

The labour movement was dealt a serious legal blow in October 1947 when the right not to be fired merely for the act of striking, which had been somewhat customary although by no means universally upheld, was effectively repealed by the ruling of Chief Justice of the Supreme Court Sir Harold Willan in the case of three woman rubber tappers who were contesting their dismissal for striking. He ruled that striking was a breach of contract and that therefore there was no legal impediment to firing.

Other setbacks to the labour movement included the convictions of two prominent Indian trade unionists on charges of intimidation. In November 1947 S. Appadurai, vice-president of the Penang Federation of Trade Unions and chairman of the Indian section of the Peneng Harbour Labour Association was charged for having written to an employer warning him against using blacklegs. He was found guilty and sent to prison. In January 1948 K. Vanivellu, secretary of the Kedah Federation of Rubber Workers Unions was charged for having written to an employer asking him to reinstate 14 workers who had been dismissed for striking and suggesting that if he did not, the remaining workers might leave the job.

For this Vanivellu was sentenced to 18 months hard labour.

== Employer Associations ==
At the same time these avenues were being pursued, employers in Malaya, with government approval, began organising themselves into associations, "employers unions", to set maximum rates for wages and other benefits.

A member was not permitted to pay more than those rates to its employees.

That such agitation [i.e., striking] has been so often successful is due in very large measure to the fact that individual employers, in order to realise quick profits, have frequently given way to it ... It is the opinion of Government that an effective union of employers has an important function to perform in resisting unreasonable demands.

— Statement to the Singapore Association by P.A.B. McKerron, Acting Governor of Singapore.,

These organisations included the Malayan Mining Employers Association (MMEA), formed late 1946, which included the larger Chinese and all European mine owners, the United Planters Association of Malaya (UPAM), and the Malayan Planting Industries Employers Association (MPIEA), formed September 1947.

A tactic of management that labour found particularly objectionable was the use of Japanese prisoners of war as replacement workers during strikes, so that workers found the same people who had oppressed them during the war appearing against them again. They were first used in the Singapore dock strike, October 1945. They were also used in the Batu Arang coal miners' strike. The POWs went unreturned to Japan until 1947, and Morgan says that they were "consistently used by the British" as replacement labour. There were nearly 20,000 Japanese POWs in Singapore in 1946.

Both Harper and Nonini note that one of the most effective resources that workers had in the tug-of-war with employers over wages and conditions was the ability of many of them to turn to small scale agriculture, usually semi-illicitly as "squatters", as an alternative to wage labour: thus if they were getting a bad deal at the estates or mines, they could simply go home and farm until better terms were forthcoming.

Labour in rural areas exploited opportunities for diversification as

best they could. Squatter cultivation was the primary means to this, and not only for Chinese. It was a major theme of the industrial militancy that accompanied post-war reconstruction. In Johore, for example, when a collapse of the rubber price led the UPAM to decree a 20 per cent cut in tapping rates in July 1947, over half the labour force left some estates. Those who remained supported themselves by illicit tapping. All the Javanese labour vanished and the Chinese went back to planting vegetables.

In the Slim River area of Perak many Indians left estates to work in Malay kampongs on a crop sharing basis. Many failed to return. For employers, squatter agriculture lay at the root of indiscipline.

In effect this small-scale agriculture was an "employer"—an "employment opportunity" to be more precise—with which the large colonial employers had to compete; they sought to eliminate the competition. One option open to them was the eviction of squatters from private land. Harper reports that in early 1948 there was a surge in the number of squatter evictions. The first meeting held to discuss the "squatter problem" during the Emergency was between representatives of UPAM and the Malayan Estate Owners' Association, and the Colonial Chief Secretary, in mid 1948. UPAM had, for the preceding year and a half, been pressing the government to take action against squatters on its lands. At the meeting, it was seeking a legal procedure whereby it could evict squatters in groups, rather than having to act against each one individually as was then required under the law.

Confrontation in the forests supercharged industrial unrest on the estates when it became apparent that the administration was working to restrict the labourer's access to alternative sources of income.

The struggle between labour and capital in post-war Malaya took place against a background of considerable violence and uncertainty in the society in general, especially in rural areas. Short has stated that the British never really regained control over rural Malaya after the Japanese occupation. The MCP continued to have a stronger presence in some remote areas than did the government right through the post-war years and into the Emergency. In addition to the MCP, there were other groups that wielded power in some places. The Indian thondar pedai have already been mentioned. Also, Kuomintang (KMT) guerrillas "set up what was in fact a local government among cultivators in the Lenggong area where they collected taxes, settled disputes and even tried and punished people." In other places Chinese secret societies (e.g., the Triad) were powerful. And, besides these, there were bandit gangs with no political interest who simply engaged in robbing.

Over much of Malaya ... not only was government unable to maintain law and order but it was, in fact sharing power and in some areas was certainly no more than first among equals.

Short gives a sample of some violent incidents that occurred in 1947:

In February forty Chinese bandits raided Klian Intan, shot a customs officer and Chinese villager and then pillaged the whole village itself. In March, two hundred and thirty illicit weapons and ten thousand rounds of ammunition were recovered from a dump nine miles (6 km) from Kuala Lumpur. In May, bandits threatened to decimate

Klian Intan unless the village paid a ransom of thirty thousand dollars.

A week later, the Kuala Lumpur-Penang night mail was derailed. Eight people were killed. In June, police and twenty bandits were engaged in an hour-long shooting battle near Grik. The following day police discovered another large arms dump in Johore. In September, three police and six civilians were killed and fourteen wounded when bandits ambushed two buses and an escorting lorry-load of policemen, again near Klian Intan. There was a slight variation later in the month when bandits in Japanese uniform terrorised an estate near Rengam in Johore.

In October, a European planter was killed and his wife injured by bandits, again in central Johore.

Short states that the rate of such violence was actually less in January through May 1948, than it had been in 1947.

Turning again to the labour scene, by early 1947, the trade union movement in Malaya had reached the high point of its success. After that, there was a marked drop in the amount of strike activity, and the trend to improvement in workers' wages and work conditions slowed, and in some cases was reversed.

The imposition of legal restrictions such as those described earlier, and the mounting opposition of employers, were undoubtedly prime causes of this change. To these reasons, Stenson has added that apparently there was a tactical decision made by the leaders of the Malayan left in early 1947 to adopt a more conciliatory approach to the business and government establishment. Let us go into these matters in more detail.

Worker days lost in strikes
		Malaya		Singapore	
		Worker days	12 month total	Worker days	12 month total
1946	Apr		713,000		1,173,000
1946	May		713,000		1,173,000
1946	Jun		713,000		1,173,000
1946	Jul		713,000		1,173,000
1946	Aug	271,000	713,000		1,173,000
1946	Sep		713,000		1,173,000
1946	Oct		713,000		1,173,000
1946	Nov		713,000		1,173,000
1946	Dec		713,000		1,173,000
1947	Jan		713,000		1,173,000
1947	Feb		713,000	171,000	1,173,000
1947	Mar		713,000		1,173,000
1947	Apr		512,000		205,000
1947	May		512,000		205,000
1947	Jun		512,000		205,000
1947	Jul		512,000		205,000
1947	Aug		512,000		205,000
1947	Sep		512,000		205,000
1947	Oct		512,000		205,000
1947	Nov		512,000		205,000
1947	Dec		512,000		205,000
1948	Jan	17,506	512,000		205,000
1948	Feb	28,049	512,000		205,000
1948	Mar	10,514	512,000		205,000
1948	Apr	12,773			
1948	May	178,634			
1948	Jun	117,154			
1948	Jul	3,394			
1948	Aug	nil			
1948	Sep	348			
1948	Oct	250			
1948	Nov	1,317			
1948	Dec	525			
Sources: The 12 month totals are from M.R. Stenson, Repression and Revolt: the Origins of the 1948 Communist Insurrection in Malaya and Singapore, Ohio University, 1969, p. 11. His citation says: "Calculated from Malayan Union Department Annual Report 1947, Table X; Malayan Union and Federation of Malaya Labour Department Monthly Reports, 1948; Singapore Labour Report 1948, Table XIV."; The figure for Malaya in Aug. 1946 is from Anthony Short, The Communist Insurrection in Malaya, 1948-60, London, 1976, p. 76. He says that it probably represents a high point in strike activity. On that page he also gives the figure for May 1948 in Malaya as 155,000.; The monthly figures for Malaya in 1948 are from Michael Morgan, "The Rise and Fall of Malayan Trade Unionism, 1945-50", in Mohamed Amin and Malcolm Calwell, ed's, Malaya, the Making of a Neo Colony; Nottingham, UK, 1977, Spokesman Books, p. 187. Morgan's source is Annual Report of the Labour Department of the Federation of Malaya for 1948, p. 85.; The figure for Singapore, Feb 1947, is from Morgan, p. 177.

Beginning in March 1947 there was a sharp reduction in strike activity. (See table.) According to Morgan, "Undoubtedly this was largely the result of the increased tempo of the employers' and Government offensive against organised labour." Stenson, however, sees nuances. In March 1947 the PMFTU had "reluctantly" decided that it would have to seek registration; also, the constitution for the upcoming Federation of Malaya was under discussion, and the MCP hoped to have a voice in this process via a left-oriented umbrella organisation of which it was a member, the All-Malayan Council of Joint Action (AMCJA); these considerations caused the MCP to unilaterally call a "cease fire" in the labour struggle, to make itself more palatable to the government.

..it would seem certain that the MCP instructed its front groups to eschew militant confrontation with employers or government after February 1947 in an attempt to gain official registration and recognition for the PMFTU, and consultation and concessions for the AMCJA. It was for this reason that the strike wave of February was suddenly called off in March, that every attempt short of abdication of centralised control was made to satisfy the Trade Union Registrar's demands, and that the PMFTU's affiliates exerted all their efforts toward beginning negotiations with the principal employers. Even the most provocative of employer or government actions, such as the military action in Kedah, the unilateral enforcement of a 20 per cent wage cut on Chinese estate workers in May, or the complete rejection of the AMCJA's proposals by the middle of the year, were greeted with only token protests, mainly taking the form of one day work stoppages.

Stenson notes that although the reduction in worker days lost in Malaya—713,000 in 1946 down to 512,000 in 1947—does not seem dramatic, many of the days lost in the latter period were in wildcat strikes, presumably not under MCP direction, by the Chinese tappers who had suffered the 20 per cent wage cut. The Singapore figures show a clear drop.

Whatever the cause for the cessation of labour militancy, the result was that in 1947 and early 1948 labour generally lost ground. Also, as already described, government continued its regulatory and legal attacks on labour. And—the acid test—the FTU's were, in the end, refused registration and the AMCJA was excluded from the constitutional discussions. Stenson:

By the end of [1947] and certainly by February 1948 the message must have become all too clear. There was to be no form of democratic process in which the MCP or its front organisations could compete peacefully for political influence. Moreover, the union movement was to be ever more strictly controlled and any form of centralised direction, whether exercised by the MCP or not, to be prevented.

In February 1948 the applications of the Pan Malayan Rubber Workers' Council and of the Pan Malayan Council of Government Workers for registration were denied by the registrar.

The quiet period in strike activity suddenly ended shortly before the Emergency was declared. "At the beginning of April [1948] the workers at the Palau Brani tin smelter in Singapore came out on strike. After two weeks they were all given 24 hours' notice and told to leave their houses." "The dockers' strike at Port Swettenham was broken by the employment of 200 Malay peasants as [replacement workers]. Cases of police brutality were frequent." A sit in strike at the Tai Thong rubber factory in Singapore was broken up by police: 38 of the workers were given 3 months rigorous imprisonment (hard labour) for trespassing. Strikes in the Slim River area of Perak resulted in 79 evictions from two of the estates involved. At the Chan Kang Swee estate in Segamut, North Johore, "the entire labour force [was] dismissed by a new European management. The workers, however, refused to leave their quarters, took over the running of the estate and expelled the manager. The latter returned with 100 police, who in a baton charge against the labourers beat to death seven and injured ten others, without firing a shot or suffering any injuries themselves.

On June 1, 1948, the MCP formally acquired Min Sheng Po, the Chinese-language newspaper with the biggest circulation in the Federation. On 9 June 1948, the editor, Liew Yit Fan, was arrested for sedition. The charge stemmed from his paper's coverage of the killings at Segamut. On 30 or 31 May 1948 the FTU leader in Perak, R.G. Balan, and four other unionists were arrested.

The regulatory changes that effectively destroyed the PMFTU, the SFTU, and the state FTU's were amendments to the Trade Union Ordinance which were passed by the Federal Legislative Council on 31 May 1948. The amendments had first been discussed by officials in November 1947 and the drafts had been approved by the Labour Advisory Board in February 1948. Stenson states that information leaks out of the Labour Advisory Board were normal and that the MCP "almost certainly" would have known of the proposals.

The amendments were in three parts. The first stipulated that a trade union official must have at least three years experience in the industry concerned. The second prohibited anyone convicted of certain criminal offences (notably intimidation and extortion, which were common charges against unionists) from holding trade union office. The third stated that a Federation could only include workers from one trade or industry. The last provision clearly eliminated the PMFTU and the SFTU. The first provision Stenson describes as "a measure designed to exclude educated 'outsiders'." It was also problematic owing to the seasonal and transient nature of much of the work in the colonial economy.

On 13 June 1948 the PMFTU and the state FTU's were notified of refusal of their registration, and outlawed.

== State of Emergency ==
The decisions made by the MCP and the colonial government that led to the Emergency have been studied by scholars. The notion that the declaration of a state of emergency on 16 June 1948 was a hurried response by the government to a carefully planned surprise attack sprung upon it by the MCP has been generally rejected. 16 June can be seen as a point in a continuum of increasing suppression of radicalism in Malaya by the government, beginning in late 1945 and extending into the "Emergency" years. Nevertheless, there does seem to have been an increase in violence in late May and early June 1948 (and, whether related or unrelated, an increase in strikes) which may have spurred the government to take the particular action it did at that time.

This however still leaves open the question whether, in the government's mind, the violence had created a necessity for action, or whether it had merely presented a "psychologically opportune moment" for the imposition of a regime that had been contemplated for some time. Historian Harper describes the information possessed by the government on the eve of the Emergency:

The raw intelligence that was received said more about the momentum that was building up from below in Perak and Johore than about the coming moves of the MCP high command. In an infamous memo, written on 14 June 1948, Dalley [head of the Malayan Security Service] reassured that 'at the time of writing there is no immediate threat to internal security in Malaya although the position is constantly changing and is potentially dangerous.' There was no positive evidence of external direction of the MCP -- there were 'no problems for which a solution cannot be found' -- though if a lenient attitude was maintained towards the Communists for the next five years, there would be certain trouble. The MCP would have to be suppressed before it became too strong, but at a 'psychologically opportune' moment when it makes a tactical error and loses popular support.

Certainly the Malayan administration was sensitive of public opinion, inside and outside of Malaya, and also the opinion of the Colonial Office in London, which at that time was serving a Labour prime minister.

Short portrays the decision making process that led specifically to the declaration of a state of emergency as having begun at a meeting of various government officials 21 May 1948, the stated purpose of which was "to consider the numerous and recent manifestations in Malaya of what appeared to be a general increase of Communist propaganda in many parts of the world, as well as in Malaya; and the steps which should be taken by the government to strike at organisations indulging in anti-government activities and to restore public confidence in the government's ability toprotect them from intimidation and lawlessness." The meeting looked for links between the recent violence and the MCP. Oddly, Short does not say whether they found any. The meeting also decided various actions should be taken including "a simultaneous raid on the headquarters of the PMFTU in Kuala Lumpur and of the Federations in each of the states", and that the "confidence" of labourers should be restored by "small bodies of troops who might be sent to various parts of the country as part of a training exercise."

Short then describes the Legislative Council debate of 31 May 1948. It contained highly anti-communistic speeches by several members, including Dato Onn. Short states that other decisions leading to the state of emergency were taken between 4 and 12 June 1948. At a meeting of the executive council on 12 June, the High Commissioner, Sir Edward Gent, revealed that an Emergency Regulations Bill was being prepared (also a Sedition Bill; and a Printing Presses Bill was already before the Council).

The Emergency was declared 16 June 1948.

== Sources ==
- Cheah Boon Kheng, Red Star Over Malaya, 1983, Singapore University Press.
- T.N. Harper, The end of empire and the making of Malaya; Cambridge, UK; 1999; Cambridge University Press.
- Daud Latiff, "The British Military Administration, September 1945 to April 1946", in Mohamed Amin and Malcolm Caldwell, ed's, Malaya, the Making of a Neo Colony; Nottingham, UK, 1977, Spokesman Books.
- Donald M. Nonini, British Colonial Rule and the Resistance of the Malay Peasantry; New Haven, Connecticut, USA.; 1992; Monograph Series 38/Yale University Southeast Asia Studies, Yale Center for International and Area Studies.
- Michael Morgan,"The Rise and Fall of Malayan Trade Unionism, 1945-50", in Mohamed Amin and Malcolm Caldwell, ed's, Malaya, the Making of a Neo Colony; Nottingham, UK, 1977, Spokesman Books.
- Anthony Short, The Communist Insurrection in Malaya, 1948-60; 1975, London, Frederick Muller.
- Michael R. Stenson, Repression and Revolt: the Origins of the 1948 Communist Insurrection in Malaya and Singapore; 1969, Ohio University.
