= Associated Marine Workers Union of New York =

Marine Workers Affiliation of the Port of New York
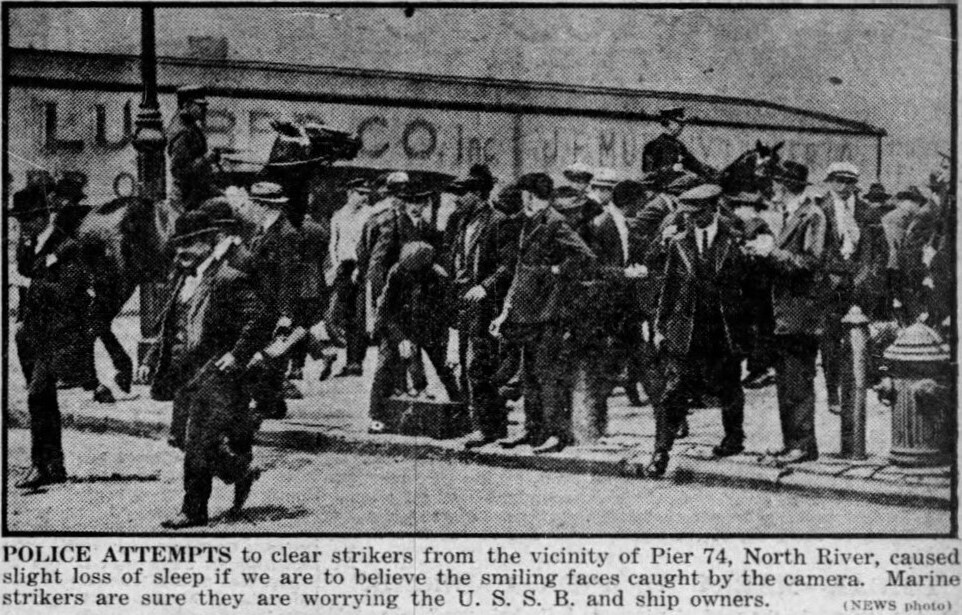
- NY Pier 74 on May 5, 1921, during the US Maritime Strike of 1921
- Founded: August 30, 1917
- Location: United States
- Leader: William A. Maher
- Main organ: Executive Committee, Two representatives from each union affiliation.
- Affiliations: Consolidated Marine Engineers’ Beneficial Association No. 33; American Association of Masters, Mates & Pilots, Harbor No. 1; Harbor Boatmens Union; Tidewater Boatmens Union; Lighter Captains Union; International Union of Steam and Operating Engineers, Local 379; Railroad, Port & Terminal Workers Union, Local 848

The Associated Marine Workers Union of New York or Marine Workers Affiliation of the Port of New York was an affiliation of seven (Note: The number of unions involved grew over time, eventually to seven.) separate unions within the New York City port. It was used to coordinate strikes and other actions to achieve a better bargaining position.

== Origins ==
=== Early roots ===
The early roots of the union affiliation's formations dates back to the 1910 strike of the International Organization of Masters, Mates & Pilots (MM&P) No. 1 in New York.

After the strike, MM&P No. 1 and Marine Engineers' Beneficial Association (MEBA) No. 33 began to plan to connect their actions and organization to better advance their economic interests. This culminated in March 1914 when a joint committee was formed, the short lived Marine Officers’ Working Affiliation. The joint committee's constitution stipulated that every month a meeting would be held between the two unions.

This remained effectively unchanged until a 1916 MEBA No. 33 strike, during which they received support from the Harbor Boatmens Union. While the boatmen did not join the affiliation, it set the groundwork for their later representation.

=== Immediate background ===
The immediate origins of the affiliation are May 29, 1917, when MEBA No. 33 requested a conference with the New York Boat Owners' Association for increasing wage rates. A date of June 20, 1917 was then set by the New York Towboat Exchange.

On the same day the MM&P No. 1 sent demands identical to MEBA to the exchange and, on June 19 the Harbor Boatmens Union requested to be included in the conference with MM&P. Both of these demands were refused, and in response MEBA No. 33 cut their negotiations with the New York Towboat Exchange in solidarity. The unions called for an investigation. Mediation and arbitration were also attempted by the US Department of Labor and New York State board but were unsuccessful.

In July 1917 at the International Longshoremen Association (ILA) convention, the Harbor Boatmens Union and the Tidewater Boatmens Union introduced a resolution calling for greater cooperation between all the New York Harbor unions to protect their working conditions. Specifically, they called for cooperation with MM&P No. 1 and MEBA No. 33, and elected representatives to communicate with them.

=== Formation ===
Then on August 30, 1917 (Note: One source says August 30, 1917 while the other says October 5, 1917) representatives from MEBA, MM&P, the Harbor Boatmens Union, and Tidewater Boatmens Union met for forming closer relations, which resulted in the formation of the Marine Workers Affiliation of the Port of New York.

On October 8, 1917 as the newly formed affiliation, they sent a set of demands to the harbor employers: that no one but the members should man the harbor boats and that the wage schedule and rules should take effect at 6 am on November 1, 1917.

An agreement to use arbitration to decide wages was made on October 20, 1917, before the United States Shipping Board. The Lighter Captains then joined the affiliation shortly before arbitration, and were covered by the wage agreements reached on November 16, 1917. Subsequently the International Union of Operating Engineers (IUOE) Local 370 joined. (Note: By or before August 1918) In total by August 1918, the affiliation made up 80% or more of all harbor employees within the New York Harbor. The Railroad, Port & Terminal Workers, Local 848 also joined the affiliation in 1918 or possibly 1919. Regardless of the official designation, the union did participate in the broader New York Harbor Strike of 1919.

== Organizational Structure ==
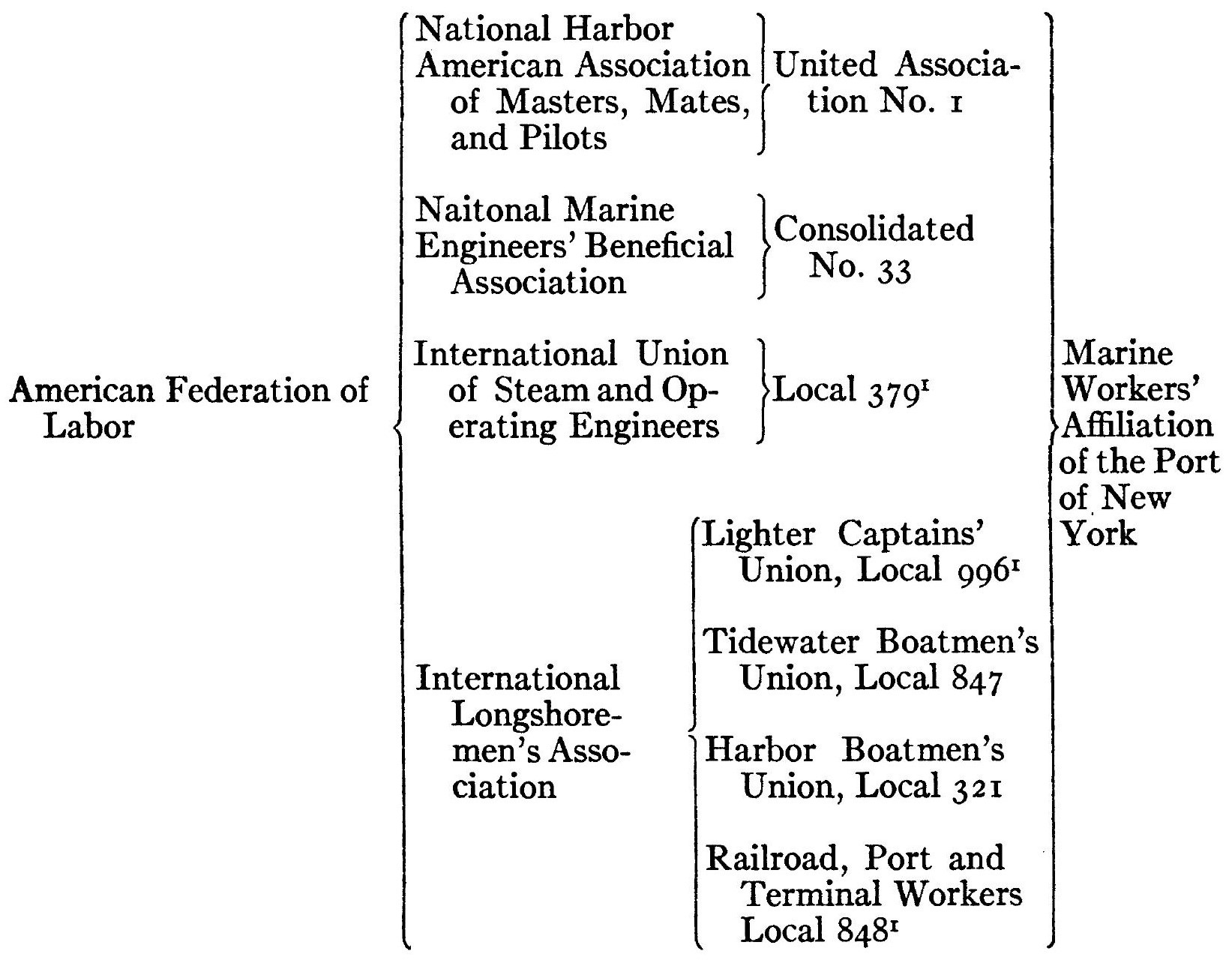

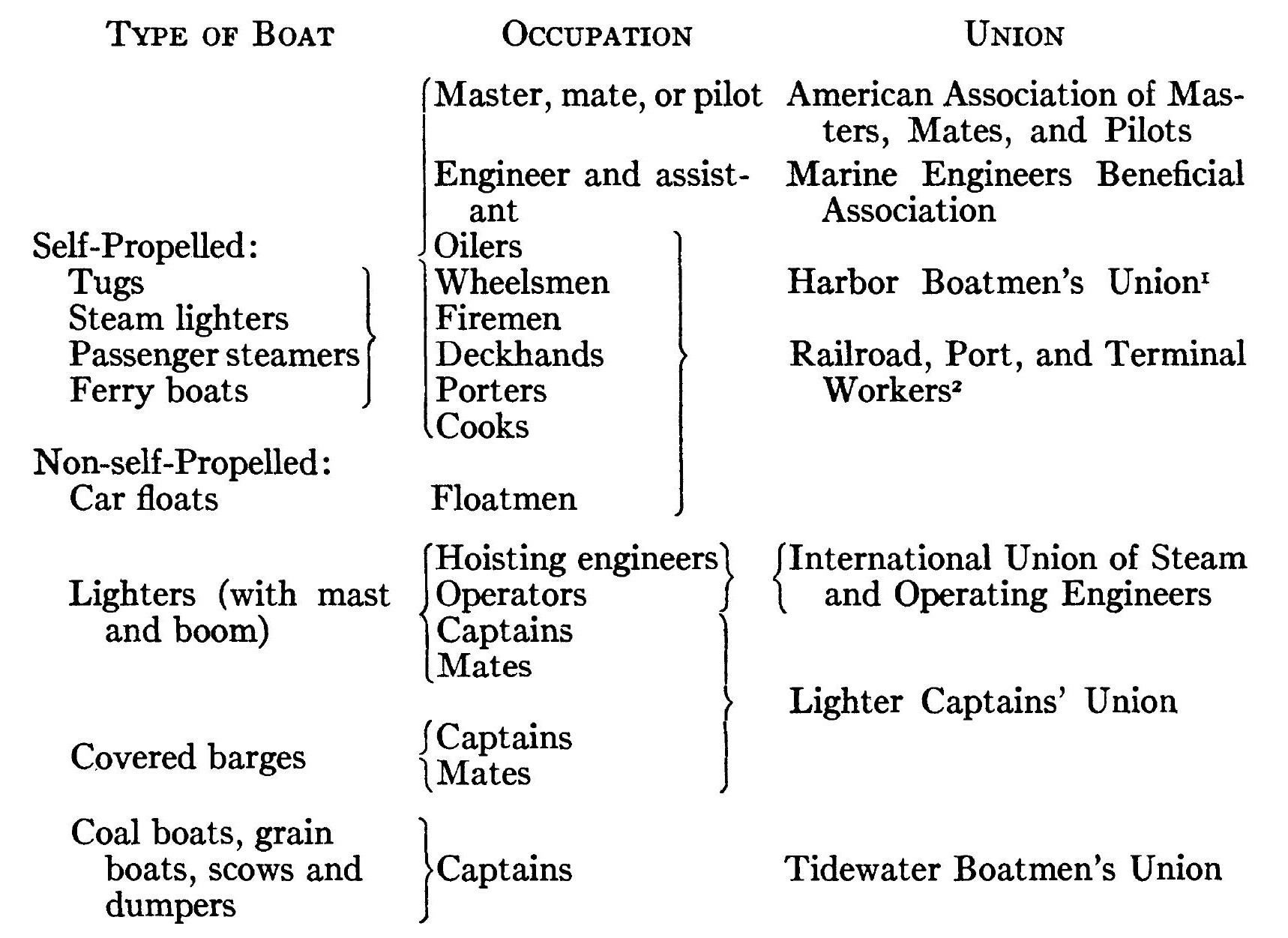

== 1919 Harbor General Strike ==
The affiliation shut down the port for weeks following the end of World War I. The strike began January 9 and paused on January 13 for arbitration. It then resumed March 4 after workers rejected the National War Labor Board ruling and ended on April 20, 1919, after new terms had been offered by both public and private port employers.

== Later Events ==
The Marine Workers Affiliation existed until at least 1931, when they warned they would strike in response to a proposed ten percent wage scale reduction for tugboat workers, which led to a retraction of the proposed cut.
