= 1919 New York City Harbor strike =

Labor strike in New York City, US

- Part of Labor Unions
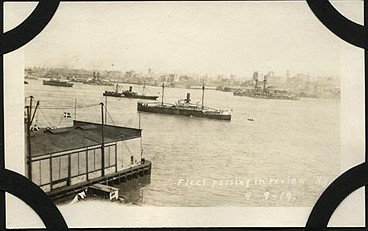
- Shipping and US fleet passing in review, April 9, 1919
- Date: Jan 9 – April 20, 1919 (107 years ago)
- Location: United States
- Caused by: End of WW1 which changed labor conditions
- Result: Public sector: Reduced 8 hour day, wage increases. Private sector: Wage increases, 10 hour day.

Parties
Marine Workers Affiliation; Harbor Workers	US Government; NYC Harbor Companies

Lead figures
William A. Maher	

Number
15,000–16,000	

The New York City Harbor strike started on January 9, 1919. It involved 15,000–16,000 workers striking after it was called by the executive committee of the Marine Workers Union.

It stopped temporarily on January 13, after President Wilson requested intervention by the War Labor Board on January 11 through a telegram. After the War Labor Board's involvement was announced, the strike was suspended on January 13.

Deliberations occurred over the next 3 weeks, a ruling was decided a month later through the case, Marine Workers’ Affiliation of New York Harbor, v. The Railroad Administration, Shipping Board, United States Navy, War Department, and Red Star Towing & Transportation Co. It was ruled on by War Labor Board Umpire, V. Everit Macy.

The specifics of the awards was divided by sectors within the industry:

1. Ferryboats;
2. Tugs, other towing vessels, and steam lighters
3. Lighters, covered barges, and hoisters;
4. Coal and grain boats, scows, and dumps.

The general findings however were as follows.

For applicable sectors, hours would be reduced. Everit cites the World War I armistice, lowering the need for long working hours. For sectors where hours were lowered, their previous pay within a month, established in 1918, would remain unchanged, effectively raising hourly pay. For all sectors, total pay for a 'normal working day' would remain unchanged. Hours worked past what was ruled a normal working day by the war board would be paid as 1.5x overtime pay. This, effective May 1, 1919 would remain in effect until peace was declared (the board was disbanded on May 31, 1919) or July 1, 1919

A Wall Street Journal article claiming the War Labor Board decision will be enforced. -January 9, 1919.

"I therefore find that no wage increase should be granted and that the wage scales in the award of the New York Harbor Board dated July 12, 1918, and those in the award of the Railroad Administration Board dated September 1, 1918, shall remain in effect during the life of this award. That those employees whose working day is herein reduced from 12 hours to 8 hours shall receive the same monthly wage for the 8 hours as they formerly did for 12 hours. Also that the employees whose week has been reduced to 48 hours shall receive the same monthly salary as previously."
- Umpire, V. Everit (2/25/1919)

However, The Marine Workers Union refused these terms and re-declared a strike on March 4, 1919. A notable exception to the strike occurred two days later, when workers returned to help dock & greet returning soldiers from World War 1.

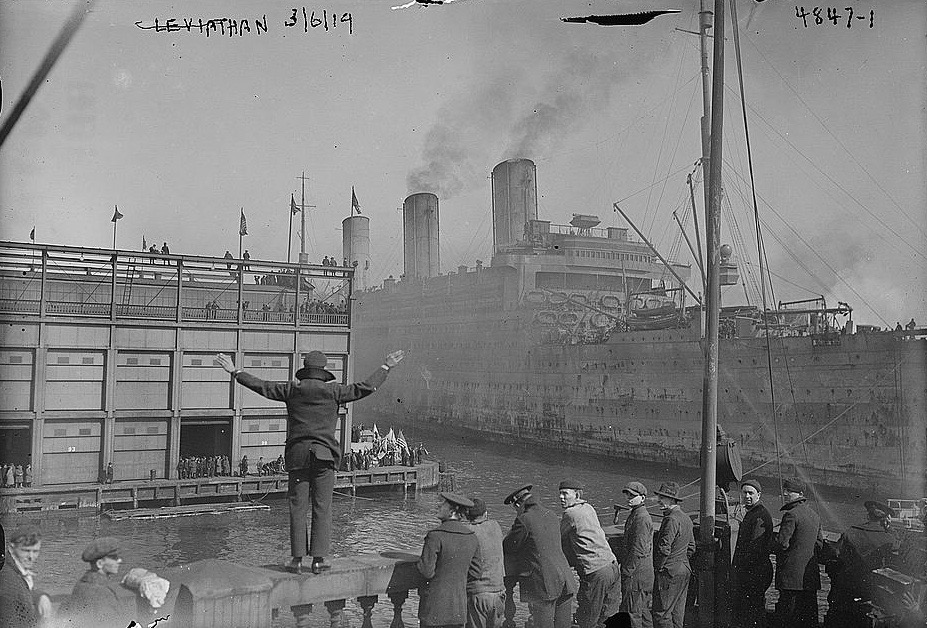
The Leviathan ship pulls into NY Harbor on March 6, 1919. Dockworkers returning from strike to ensure it and Mauretania’s safe arrival of the men of the 27th.

By March 24, the four main government agencies involved (The Railroad Administration, Shipping Board, United States Navy & War Department) had conceded to strikers demands for higher wages, against the legally binding War Board decision. The Railroad Administration was the first to grant the eight hour day with wage increases, after which the three other administrations followed, ending the strike for the public sector.

However, the strike continued for private boats. A preliminary deal was reached for the remaining 4,000-5,000 striking workers on April 20, 1919. Which was then followed by two months of deliberation by the Arbitration Board, with an agreement reached on June 16, 1919. The deal conceded retroactive pay increases for private boat workers, 1 week paid vacation (for those who had worked for more than a year), and meal compensation; However the 10 hours day remained the same as before for private boat workers, unlike the public workers who had successfully won an hours decrease.

== See also ==
- New York City tugboat strike of 1946
- 1919 Seattle General Strike
- 1912 New York City waiters' strike
- 1938 New York City truckers strike
- 2024 United States port strike
