= 2024 United States port strike =

Labor stoppage on U.S. East Coast and Gulf Coast ports

- Date: October 1–3, 2024
- Location: United States East Coast and Gulf Coast ports
- Goals: 77% increase in wages over 6 years; Complete ban on automation

Parties
- International Longshoremen's Association (ILA)
- U.S. Maritime Alliance (USMX)
47,000 port workers at 36 ports

Lead figures
Harold Daggett	

The 2024 United States port strike was a labor strike involving over 47,000 port workers who are part of the International Longshoremen's Association (ILA), impacting 36 ports across the United States primarily along the East Coast and the Gulf Coast. The strike began at midnight EST on October 1, 2024, following the expiration of a contract between the port workers and the ports due to disagreements about compensation for workers and the use of automation.

Dockworkers agreed to suspend the strike on October 3, 2024, with their current contract extended until January 15, 2025, as negotiations continue.

== Background ==
West Coast port dockworkers, spanning 29 ports, are covered by a different union, the International Longshore and Warehouse Union. On September 1, 2023, they ratified a six-year contract with the Pacific Maritime Association. The top-tier hourly wage of $39 for longshoremen amounts to just over $81,000 annually, but dockworkers can make significantly more by taking on extra shifts. For example, according to a 2019-20 annual report from the Waterfront Commission of New York Harbor, about one-third of local longshoremen made $200,000 or more a year. A more typical longshoreman's salary can exceed $100,000, but not without logging substantial overtime hours. Harold Daggett, the ILA president, maintains that these higher earners work up to 100 hours a week. Across the industry, including in nonunion jobs, pay for some dockworkers can be far more modest at around $53,000 a year, according to job site Indeed.

Organized labor enjoys rising public support and has had a string of recent victories in other industries, in addition to the backing of the pro-union administration of President Joe Biden. The dockworkers' negotiating stand is likely further strengthened by the nation's supply chain of goods being under pressure in the aftermath of Hurricane Helene, which has coincided with the peak shipping season for holiday goods.

The strike represented the first strike at East Coast and Gulf Coast ports since 1977.

== Timeline ==
=== Prelude ===
Negotiations between the ILA and the United States Maritime Alliance began breaking down in June 2024. One major sticking point was wages. The ILA wanted members to receive a $5/hour raise each year of the next six-year contract, whereas the Maritime Alliance proposed a $2.50/hour raise each year.

The U.S. Maritime Alliance (USMX) negotiated intensively with the International Longshoremen's Association (ILA) on pay raises, the latter representing East Coast and Gulf Coast port workers which handle 43% to 49% of all U.S. imports, constituting several billions of USD in trade every month. with the latter proposing an opening offer of a gradual pay raise of 77% over the course of the six-year contract to account for several years of smaller wage increases and inflation. The union also demanded that automation be completely banned for port work. The prior contract gave dockworkers starting wages between $20 and $39 per hour based on experience.

Following two days of negotiations, ILA President Harold Daggett, who was part of the union the last time the association held a strike in 1977, told union members that a strike would commence at 12:01 a.m. EST on October 1 if USMX did not meet their demands, which union members gave unanimous support for. The ILA requested the pay increase due to inflation in addition to their work helping to greatly increase shipping profits during the COVID-19 pandemic. In a video statement, Daggett who is a critic of the Biden administration, threatened United States President Joe Biden's administration with a worker slowdown if they attempted to force members back to work using the Taft-Hartley Act. Under the Taft-Hartley Act, Biden could seek a court order for an 80-day cooling-off period that would end the strike at least temporarily, but he has told reporters that he wouldn't take that step. Biden in a statement said “As our nation climbs out of the aftermath of Hurricane Helene, dockworkers will play an essential role in getting communities the resources they need. Now is not the time for ocean carriers to refuse to negotiate a fair wage for these essential workers while raking in record profits.” Ben Nolan, a transportation analyst with Stifel, said the administration isn't likely to intervene until consumers start to see empty shelves or can't find critical goods like medicines.

On the evening of September 30, the eve of the strike, the U.S. Maritime Alliance proposed a 50% pay raise and a commitment to limited incorporation of automation, but not a complete ban, as a means to resume negotiations. The alliance also claimed that they had tripled port employer contributions to worker healthcare and retirement benefits. At night, the ILA made a statement accusing the alliance of refusing to incorporate their requests for a fair contract. The union called the 50% pay raise proposal "unacceptable". USMX accused ILA of refusing to negotiate, and asked labor regulators to command that the union continue them in a formal complaint. ILA dismissed the complaint as a "publicity stunt".

=== Course of the strike ===
In anticipation of the official start of the strike, workers at the Port of Virginia began systematically halting operations after 8:00 a.m. EST, closing the port gates for truck deliveries at noon, issuing orders for ships to leave the port by 1:00 p.m., and ceasing cargo work at 6 p.m.

At midnight on October 1, dockworkers outside the Port of Philadelphia began to picket and demonstrate in a circle, chanting: “No work without a fair contract” next to a union truck bearing a message decrying the impact of automation on job security and workers' families. About fifty Port Houston dockworkers began to picket at 11 p.m. CST. As of Oct 3, no negotiations had been scheduled, but the port owners signaled willness to start new talks.

The ILA stated that demonstrations would be conducted 24/7 until a $5 an hour salary increase was established in the new contract and that all container royalties went to workers.

The U.S. Maritime Alliance, which represents ports and shipping companies, reports that both sides have moved from their initial wage offers. But on October 2, 2024, the alliance called on the International Longshoremen’s Union to come to the bargaining table. “We cannot agree to preconditions to return to bargaining, but we remain committed to bargaining in good faith,” the group said in a statement. The same day, the ILA said that Harold Daggett, its president, and other union officers, had received death threats since the strike began. The union said the threats were reported to police. President Joe Biden told reporters on October 3, 2024 that he thought progress was being made in ending the strike. When asked how much, Biden said “We’ll find out soon.”

== Impact ==
=== Estimates ===
Experts in supply chains said that while the strike likely would not generally cause immediate significant impacts, that it could cause a drastic interruption in the United States' supply chain in a few weeks, causing delays in products reaching businesses and higher prices. They also predicted that the strike would also significantly hamper West Coast port operations. Perishable items such as fruits and vegetables, on the other hand, were predicted to have immediate impacts on supply due to the strike-impacted ports working with large proportions of the United States' supplies (e.g. handling 75% of the U.S.'s supply of bananas).

Economists predicted that the slowing of industrial and consumer goods and resulting price hikes could significantly hinder the economy following its gradual improvement against inflation. The Anderson Economic Group estimated that the U.S. economy would lose $2.1 billion from a one-week strike, $1.5 billion due to the loss in value or degradation of items such as perishable goods, $400 million for transportation company losses, and $200 million in lost wages for the striking port workers. The research group further predicted that the losses per day would accelerate the longer the strike went on. J.P. Morgan estimated a higher $3.8 billion to $4.5 billion loss per day for the economy for the length of the strike, with some losses recovered following the strike's end.

United States Analysts at Sea Intelligence estimated that $3.7 billion in un-handled freight would be lost per day by the strike in East Coast ports alone, based on them handling an estimated 74,000 shipping containers per day for October 24 worth an average of about $50,000. The organization also predicted that it would take five days to resume normal port operations following a one-day long strike, and it would take until mid-November until port operation and supply chain slowdowns stopped after a one-week long strike. Economist Grace Zemmer estimated that the strike could cause a temporary loss of employment for over 100,000 people.

== Ports affected ==
There are 36 ports affected, including the following:

- Port of Boston, Massachusetts
- Port Authority of New York and New Jersey
- Port of Philadelphia, Pennsylvania
- Port of Wilmington, Delaware
- Port of Baltimore, Maryland
- Port of Virginia
  - Port of Norfolk, Virginia
- Port of Wilmington, North Carolina
- Port of Charleston, South Carolina
- Port of Savannah, Georgia
- Port of Brunswick, Georgia
- JAXPort, Florida
- Port of Palm Beach, Florida
- Port Everglades, Florida
- Port of Miami, Florida
- Port Tampa Bay, Florida
- Port of Mobile, Alabama
- Port of New Orleans, Louisiana
- Port of Houston, Texas

== Responses ==
=== Government ===
Two days before the strike on September 29, United States President Joe Biden stated that he would not intervene in the strike when asked by reporters. On September 30, he ordered National Economic Council Director Lael Brainard and White House Chief of Staff Jeff Zients to talk with USMX's leadership to convince them to quickly work out a fair deal, which did not prevent the strike. The United States Chamber of Commerce insisted that Biden take action to stop the strike, recalling the negative impact supply chain delays and shortages caused to the economy during the COVID-19 pandemic early in Biden's presidency.

Republican lawmakers and business groups urged Biden to apply the 1947 Taft-Hartley Act to end the strike. President George W. Bush used that authority in 2002 to halt an 11-day lockout of union members at West Coast ports.

On 1 October, Biden said that he urged the ILA to settle with a $4 an hour salary increase prior to the strike, and insisted that the USMX return to negotiations with a fair contract.

Governor of New York Kathy Hochul released a statement just prior to the onset of the strike, assuring that the state was taking special efforts to provide healthcare facilities and grocery stores with essential goods.

=== Unions ===
The Transportation Trades Department (TTD) of the AFL-CIO released a public statement prior to the strike in support of the organization and its aims, and accused the port employers of knowingly delaying contract negotiations to the last moment despite knowing the damage it would cause to American consumers and the U.S. economy, and using it to put the blame on workers. President of the AFL-CIO Liz Shuler said that any attempts by the government to invoke the Taft-Hartley Act or try to force striking workers to negotiate on worse terms would only benefit employers at the expense of workers. Labor experts noted that attempting to stop the strike would likely significantly hinder Vice President Kamala Harris's presidential campaign to succeed Biden.

The International Brotherhood of Teamsters issued a statement expressing solidarity towards striking port workers and the ILA, while also warning that "[t]he U.S. government should stay the f**k out of this fight[sic] and allow union workers to withhold their labor for the wages and benefits they have earned.".

=== Trade Associations ===
In the days leading up to contract expiration, several industry associations called for intervention to prevent potential disruptions.

The National Association of Manufacturers urged congressional leaders to intervene against the strike and help both parties reach a deal if Biden was unwilling to take action to speed up negotiations.

A coalition of nearly 200 agricultural groups, led by the National Grain and Feed Association, called on the Biden administration to intervene, citing imminent damage to U.S. agriculture and the economy.

=== Ports ===
The port of Los Angeles and port of Long Beach say they have capacity to handle more cargo rerouted from the East, although additional volume could create some bottlenecks.

=== Public ===
In the days following the strike's onset, multiple news outlets reported on consumers engaging in panic buying at grocery stores and other retailers, in particular purchasing large quantities of toilet paper and paper towels despite them not being affected products. Journalists drew comparisons to similar phenomena that occurred early into the COVID-19 pandemic.

== See also ==
- 2012 Ports of Los Angeles and Long Beach strike
- 1936 Gulf Coast maritime workers' strike
- 1935 Gulf Coast longshoremen's strike
- 1919 New York City Harbor strike
- 1895 New Orleans dockworkers massacre
