= De Veau v. Braisted =

- Supreme Court of the United States

Argued March 1, 1960 Decided June 6, 1960
- Full case name: De Veau v. Braisted
- Citations: 363 U.S. 144 (more) 80 S. Ct. 1146; 4 L. Ed. 2d 1109; 1960 U.S. LEXIS 1863

Case history
- Prior: On appeal from the Court of Appeals of New York, 5 N.Y.2d 236, 183 N.Y.S.2d 793, 157 N.E.2d 165 (1959); probable jurisdiction noted, 361 U.S. 806 (1959).

Holding
- An interstate compact restricting convicted felons from holding union office is not preempted by the National Labor Relations Act or the Labor Management Reporting and Disclosure Act, does not violate the 14th Amendment, and is not an ex post facto law or bill of attainder under Article One of the Constitution

Court membership
- Chief Justice Earl Warren Associate Justices Hugo Black · Felix Frankfurter; William O. Douglas · Tom C. Clark; John M. Harlan II · William J. Brennan Jr. Charles E. Whittaker · Potter Stewart

Case opinions
- Majority: Frankfurter, joined by Clark, Whittaker, Stewart
- Concurrence: Brennan
- Dissent: Douglas, joined by Warren, Black
- Harlan took no part in the consideration or decision of the case.

Laws applied
- National Labor Relations Act; Labor Management Reporting and Disclosure Act; 14th Amendment; U.S. Constitution Article One, Section 10; U.S. Constitution, Article Four, Section 1

De Veau v. Braisted, 363 U.S. 144 (1960), is a 5-to-3 ruling by the Supreme Court of the United States that an interstate compact restricting convicted felons from holding union office is not preempted by the National Labor Relations Act or the Labor Management Reporting and Disclosure Act, does not violate the Due Process Clause of the 14th Amendment, and is not an ex post facto law or bill of attainder in violation of Article One, Section 10 of the Constitution.

== Background ==
Cargo ships entering a port must be loaded and unloaded quickly, because delay can ruin perishable cargo and/or lead to heavy financial losses. Prior to the development of container ships, this work was done largely by hand by longshoremen. A single longshoreman can refuse to unload cargo, but can easily be replaced by another worker. However, when longshoremen are unionized, the longshoremen's union can obtain great leverage over shippers. Labor racketeers can essentially extort wages, benefits, and featherbed jobs from employers; engage in extensive cargo theft; solicit and receive bribes; and extort payments from longshoremen in order to obtain union jobs.

In 1937, Genovese crime family mobster Anthony "Tough Tony" Anastasio gained control of all six of the International Longshoremen's Association's local unions at the Port of New York and New Jersey. Extensive corruption and widespread violence followed. After a 1951 wildcat strike and the 1950–1951 revelations of the United States Senate Special Committee to Investigate Crime in Interstate Commerce, which exposed extensive organized crime influence throughout the U.S., New York Governor Thomas E. Dewey announced on March 28, 1951, that he was establishing the New York State Crime Commission to report on the extent of organized crime in the Port of New York and New Jersey, and to make recommendations on combating the menace. The commission held public and private hearings for more than a year before issuing a report in May 1953. As a direct result of the Crime Commission's report, the states of New York and New Jersey both enacted legislation (known as the "New York Waterfront Commission Act of 1953") establishing a New York Waterfront Commission whose main task was to rid the Port of New York and New Jersey of corruption.

However, in 1935, Congress had passed and President Franklin D. Roosevelt had signed into law the National Labor Relations Act, a federal law which governed labor relations in the United States. Article VI, Section 1, Clause 2 of the United States Constitution (better known as the Supremacy Clause) and subsequent Supreme Court rulings establish that states are barred from acting in an area of law where the federal government has already asserted jurisdiction through the passage of law. Additionally, Article One, Section 10, Clause 3 of the Constitution (often called the "Compact Clause") bars states from entering into compacts or agreements with one another without the express approval of the United States federal government. Thus, for the New York–New Jersey legislation to survive constitutional scrutiny, the federal government would also need to approve it. Congress did exactly that, and on August 12, 1953 (two and a half months after Governor Dewey first proposed the legislation), President Dwight Eisenhower signed federal legislation giving federal sanction to the New York Waterfront Commission Act of 1953.

Section 8 of the New York Waterfront Commission Act of 1953, in essence, bars from union office any person convicted of a felony who has not either been pardoned or received a certificate of good conduct from the New York or New Jersey parole board.

George De Veau, secretary-treasurer of Local 1346 of the International Longshoremen's Association, had been convicted of grand larceny and received a suspended sentence. In 1956, the district attorney of Richmond County, John M. Braisted, Jr. informed De Veau and the union that since De Veau had never been pardoned or received a certificate of good conduct, he could no longer serve as secretary-treasurer. The union suspended De Veau. De Veau sued for an injunction which would return him to office, claiming that the New York Waterfront Commission Act of 1953 violated the Supremacy Clause, violated the Due Process Clause of the 14th Amendment, and was an ex post facto law and bill of attainder which violated Article One, Section 10 of the Constitution.

The New York Supreme Court, Appellate Division denied De Veau relief. De Veau appealed, but the Court of Appeals of New York, the highest court in New York state, affirmed the denial in 1959. De Veau appealed to the U.S. Supreme Court, which granted certiorari.

== Ruling ==
=== Majority decision ===
Associate Justice Felix Frankfurter wrote the majority decision for the Court, joined by Associate Justices Tom C. Clark, Charles Evans Whittaker, and Potter Stewart.

Justice Frankfurter noted that the Court had jurisdiction as a constitutional issue had been raised. He reviewed the extensive problems with organized crime which had given rise to the Act, the investigations by the U.S. Senate committee and the state of New York, the structure of the Act, and supplementary enacting legislation passed by both New York and New Jersey. Section 8 of the New York supplementary legislation was at issue. Frankfurter noted that the compact expressly provided for congressional pre-approval of supplementary legislation, that Sec. 8 had been enacted after the compact had been submitted to Congress but before Congress had approved the original compact, and that Sec. 8 was not bi-state in nature (even though New York and New Jersey had enacted substantively identical legislation).

De Veau had argued that the Supreme Court's decision in Hill v. Florida, 325 U.S. 538 (1945), in which a Florida labor relations law similarly barred from union office any person convicted of a felony. But the bi-state compact, Frankfurter held, was not like the Florida law. The bi-state compact did not impede the federal legislation, and the two were not prevented from functioning side-by-side. In a major restatement of the doctrine of preemption, Frankfurter wrote:

The fact that there is some restriction due to the operation of state law does not settle the issue of preemption. The doctrine of preemption does not present a problem in physics, but one of adjustment because of the interdependence of federal and state interests and of the interaction of federal and state powers. Obviously, the National Labor Relations Act does not exclude every state policy that may, in fact, restrict the complete freedom of a group of employees to designate "representatives of their own choosing."

Congress had not intended to bar all state restrictions on union officials, Frankfurter asserted. Indeed, the purely local problem faced by New York and New Jersey had prompted a purely local solution, one which Congress had "unambiguously" supported, he said. Indeed, Sec. 8 had already been enacted by both states prior to Congressional approval of the compact, and Sec. 8 had clearly been brought to the attention of Congress during debate over the original compact. Furthermore, Congress had expressly approved of supplementary legislation in its enabling bill, and neither the extensive federal and state acknowledgement of corruptionnor the congressional debate over pre-approval of supplementary legislation had occurred in the Florida case.

De Veau had further argued that the passage in 1959 of the Labor Management Reporting and Disclosure Act (LMRDA) also preempted the interstate compact. Title V of the LMRDA specifically imposed restrictions on union officers, clearly preempting any state action in this area, De Veau said. The majority disagreed. Passage of Title V of the LMRDA, Frankfurter wrote, shows just the opposite—that Congress did not find state restrictions on the right to hold union office incompatible with pre-1959 federal labor policies. Furthermore, Frunkfurter interpreted Section 504(a) and Section 603(a) of the LMRDA as specifically disclaiming of preemption of state laws regulating union officials (which only a few, limited, express exceptions).

Frankfurter next turned the majority's attention to De Veau's due process claim. Applying a reasonability test to the bi-state compact, Frankfurter concluded that the extensive record of the federal and state investigations had shown that corruption on the waterfront was so extensive and so intertwined with those who were felons that a felony bar was eminently reasonable. He went on to note that federal law often employed this remedy, and that the Court had previously approved state laws which had done so.

As for De Veau's final challenge, Frankfurter noted that, under United States v. Lovett, 328 U.S. 303 (1946), the critical factor was whether legislative determination of guilt had been substituted for judicial judgment. Since a court of competent jurisdiction (not the legislature) had already convicted De Veau, Sec. 8 was clearly not a bill of attainder. Under Hawker v. New York, the majority said, the critical factor was whether "unpleasant consequences are brought to bear upon an individual for prior conduct is whether the legislative aim was to punish that individual for past activity, or whether the restriction of the individual comes about as a relevant incident to a regulation of a present situation, such as the proper qualifications for a profession." The intent of the states of New York and New Jersey was clearly not to punish felons, Frankfurter wrote, but rather to rid the waterfront of corruption. Subsequently, Sec. 8 was not an ex post facto law, either.

The judgment of the Court of Appeals of New York was affirmed.

=== Concurrence by Justice Brennan ===
Associate Justice William J. Brennan, Jr. wrote an opinion concurring in the majority opinion. His 109-word concurrence agrees with the majority that Sec. 8 was a reasonable restriction, was not preempted by federal law, and did not deny due process.

=== Dissent ===
Associate Justice William O. Douglas wrote a dissent, in which Chief Justice Earl Warren and Associate Justice Hugo Black joined.

Justice Douglas argued that the majority's ruling simply could not be squared with the Court's decision in Hill v. Florida. Citing Hill v. Florida, 325 U. S. 538 at 541, Douglas noted that the Hill court had Sec. 7 of the NLRA to provide for absolutely no state restrictions whatsoever on the qualifications for union office. Douglas also concluded that the court's reading of the legislative history of the Act was incorrect. The plain text of Article 15, Section 1 of the compact, he said, clearly provided for no additional state restrictions on union officers. Similarly, Douglas held that Section 2(a) of the LMRDA unmistakably reserved to Congress the right to place restrictions on an individual's qualifications for union office. The majority, Douglas said, fundamentally misconstrued Sec. 504(a) of the LMRDA, which only refers to enforcement of criminal (not civil) laws against union officers.

Since Sec. 8 is not valid under the Supremacy Clause, Douglas said, he would overturn the judgment of the Court of Appeals of New York. He would rule narrowly on those grounds, and not decide the remaining questions.

== Assessment ==
Although only a plurality opinion, De Veau v. Braisted was embraced by a majority of the Supreme Court in Brown v. Hotel and Restaurant Employees, 468 U.S. 491 (1984). De Veau is sometimes cited as a key case in which the Supreme Court relied heavily on congressional debate and authorizing legislation to determine congressional intent.

The Supreme Court has used several tests of the decades to decide whether a law is an ex post facto one or not. De Veau v. Braisted is generally considered the first modern restatement of these tests, although others have since been used.

== Bibliography ==
- Broun, Caroline N. The Evolving Use and the Changing Role of Interstate Compacts: A Practitioner's Guide. Chicago, Ill.: American Bar Association, 2006.
- "Court Keeps Curbs on I.L.A. Officials." New York Times. February 27, 1959.
- "Dewey Names 5-Man Board to Investigate State Crime." New York Times. March 30, 1951.
- "Dewey Sets Saratoga Inquiry and Plans State Crime Body." New York Times. March 29, 1951.
- Feldman, Daniel L. and Benjamin, Gerald. Tales From the Sausage Factory: Making Laws in New York State. Albany, N.Y.: State University of New York Press, 2010.
- Jacobs, James B. Mobsters, Unions, and Feds: The Mafia and the American Labor Movement. Paperback ed. New York: New York University Press, 2006.
- Jensen, Vernon. Hiring of Dock Workers and Employment Practices in the Ports of New York, Liverpool, London, Rotterdam, and Marseilles. Cambridge, Mass.: Harvard University Press, 1964.
- Kimeldorf, Howard. Reds or Rackets?: The Making of Radical and Conservative Unions on the Waterfront. Berkeley, Calif.: University of California Press, 1988.
- Leviero, Anthony. "President Signs Bill Aimed at Ending Dock Crime Here." New York Times. August 13, 1953.
- Mello, William. "Strikes on the Port of New York, 1945-1960." In The Encyclopedia of Strikes in American History. Aaron Brenner, Benjamin Day, and Immanuel Ness, eds. Armonk, N.Y.: M.E. Sharpe, 2009.
- O'Reilly, James T. Federal Preemption of State and Local Law: Legislation, Regulation, and Litigation. Chicago: American Bar Association, 2006.
- Weaver, Jr., Warren. "Bills to Rid Docks of 'Gangster' Rule Offered By Dewey." New York Times. June 22, 1953.
- Weaver, Jr., Warren. "Dewey and Driscoll Sign Laws Setting Up Port Crime Controls." New York Times. July 1, 1953.
