= James B. Jacobs =

American criminology educator (1947–2020)

James Barrett Jacobs (April 25, 1947 – March 19, 2020) was the Warren E. Burger Professor of Constitutional Law and the Courts at New York University School of Law, where he was a faculty member since 1982. He was a specialist in criminal law, criminal procedure, and criminal justice.

== Personal ==
Jacobs was born in Bronxville, New York. He and his brother Daniel (born 1952) grew up and attended public school in Mt. Vernon, New York, where his father, Milton Jacobs, had a law practice.

In 1975, Jacobs met Jan Sweeney, a British-born academic accountant. They married in 1977. Their first child, Thomas, was born in 1978 and their second child, Sophi, was born in 1980. They have 4 young granddaughters (Rowan and Aurora Krause and Anna and Alma Jacobs). Jacobs lived in Greenwich Village and had a keen interest in classical music, opera, ballet, and modern dance. Until 2019, when he was diagnosed with ALS, he was an avid skier. Jacobs died on March 19, 2020.

== Professional ==
Jacobs earned his BA (1969) at Johns Hopkins University, where he majored in sociology and minored in Russian. After completing military training (U.S. Army Reserves), he spent most of 1970 in Eastern Europe and the Soviet Union as a Thomas J. Watson Fellow.

In the fall of 1970, Jacobs began study at the University of Chicago Law School. During the summer of 1971, he served as a research assistant to the eminent criminal law professor Norval Morris. Professor Morris enjoyed a close relationship with the Illinois Director of Corrections, Peter Bensinger, and arranged for Jacobs to spend his 1972 summer doing research at Stateville Penitentiary in Joliet, Illinois. Jacobs’ research, focusing on how several Chicago-based super gangs operated within the prison, resulted in “Street Gangs Behind Bars,” published in the sociology journal Social Problems in 1973. This was the first scholarly article to deal with gangs in prison and launched Jacobs' career.

After graduating with a JD with high honors from the University of Chicago Law School in 1973, Jacobs became a full-time PhD student in the University of Chicago's Department of Sociology. The sociologist Morris Janowitz was the chair of his PhD committee, which also included Norval Morris, Barry Schwartz, and Edward Shils. Under Janowitz’s guidance, Jacobs’ prison research grew into a dissertation (PhD 1975) and a book, Stateville: The Penitentiary in Mass Society, now regarded as a classic in American penology.

In the fall of 1975, Jacobs became an assistant professor of law and sociology at Cornell University. He received tenure in both departments in 1980, but subsequently switched his appointment full-time into the law school, where he taught criminal law. During these years, Jacobs wrote Guard Unions and the Future of the Prisons (Institute of Public Employment, New York State School of Industrial and Labor Relations, 1978), Individual Rights and Institutional Authority: Cases and Materials (Bobbs-Merrill Co., 1979), and began work on New Perspectives on Prisons and Imprisonment (Cornell University Press, 1983).

Jacobs served as a visiting professor of law at New York University School of Law for the 1981-82 academic year. He arrived at NYU the same day as John Sexton, who later became the law school’s dean and NYU’s president, and with whom Jacobs has shared a close and lasting friendship. At the end of that academic year, Jacobs resigned from Cornell University to become professor of law at NYU and director of the law school’s Center for Research in Crime and Justice. Jacobs has been a member of the NYU Law faculty ever since, regularly teaching criminal law, criminal procedure, and such other courses as federal criminal law, juvenile justice, and specialty criminal justice area seminars on such topics as drunk driving, gun control, corruption and corruption control, prison law and policy, labor racketeering and organized crime control, the drug war, vice crimes, sentencing, privatization of criminal justice, criminal records policy and jurisprudence, cyber crime, and asset forfeiture and money laundering. Jacobs has co-taught seminars at NYU Law with David Garland, Ron Goldstock, Robert Stewart, Norval Morris, Jerome Cohen, Ronald K. Noble, Sharon Levin, Chester Mirsky, Joseph Viteritti, Anne Milgram, Judith Germano, Thomas Wiegand, John Gleeson, Eric Ruben, and Peter Kougasian. As a champion of the law school’s criminal law program, Jacobs has been instrumental in recruiting to the law school some of its most distinguished faculty members, including David Garland, Stephen Schulhofer, Rachel Barkow, Erin Murphy, and Jerome Skolnick, who became co-director of the Center for the Research in Crime and Justice upon joining the NYU Law faculty in 1997.

Jacobs has also, over the years, undertaken research collaborations with dozens of students of the law school and fellows of the Center for Research in Crime and Justice, including co-authoring books with Frank Anechiarico, Kimberly Potter, Coleen Friel, Robert Raddick, Christopher Panarella, Jay Worthington, Kerry Cooperman, and Zoe Fuhr, as well as co-authoring scores of scholarly articles. And he has maintained strong ties with criminologists and other scholars from around the world, including Cyrille Fijnaut (Netherlands), Elena Larrauri (Spain), Xiuimei Wang (China), Dirk van Zyl Smit (South Africa and UK), and Henner Hess (Germany).

With the support and encouragement of NYU alumnus, Alan Fortunoff, Jacobs launched the law school’s monthly Fortunoff Criminal Justice Colloquium in 1983. Fifteen years later, when Fortunoff died, the distinguished criminal defense lawyer, Jack Hoffinger, became the colloquium's benefactor. The multidisciplinary Criminal Justice Colloquium meets each month during the academic year. It features a public lecture by a leading criminal justice or criminology scholar, followed by questions and discussion. The Hoffinger Colloquium serves as a magnet for criminal justice professors, researchers, policymakers, and practitioners from the metropolitan area and beyond. With Ron Goldstock’s support, Jacobs also established the law school’s weekly criminal law faculty seminar, which has furthered community-building among NYU Law’s diverse full-time and adjunct criminal law faculty, criminal law fellows, and visiting researchers.

In 1995, Jacobs served as Fulbright teaching fellow at the University of Cape Town. In 1988, Jacobs was visiting professor of law at Columbia University. In 1998, then dean (and later NYU president) John Sexton awarded Jacobs the Warren E. Burger Chair of Constitutional Law and the Courts.

Since 2000, Jacobs has been a fellow of the American Society of Criminology. He served for many years as chair of the advisory board of NYU Press. For many years, he also served on the advisory board of the NYC Criminal Justice Agency. In 2010, Attorney General Eric Holder appointed Jacobs to the National Institute of Corrections’ advisory board; Holder renewed the appointment in 2011.

In 2012, the International Association for the Study of Organized Crime awarded Jacobs its lifetime achievement award. In 2012, the John Simon Guggenheim Memorial Foundation named Jacobs a 2012–2013 fellow. On October 3, 2019, his colleagues honored him with a gala tribute celebrating his scholarship and his community-building at the law school. Speakers included U.S. and foreign scholars.

== Publications ==
Jacobs is the author, or co-author, of seventeen books. In 1989, he published Drunk Driving: An American Dilemma, a wide-ranging jurisprudential and policy analysis of drunk driving as a social phenomenon, criminal offense and target of socio-legal control. He also took up a multi-year consulting position with the New York State Organized Crime Task Force (OCTF), whose director was Ronald Goldstock. Jacobs worked with the OCTF on a study and investigation of Cosa Nostra penetration of the NYC construction industry. The study was published in 1990 as Corruption and Racketeering In The New York City Construction Industry: The Final Report of the New York State Organized Crime Task Force. It was the first of five books that Jacobs was to write over the next twenty years on various aspects of the government's legal attack on the Cosa Nostra. Jacobs’ collaboration with OCTF also brought him in touch with Hamilton College’s public administration scholar, Frank Anechiarico, with whom Jacobs published a pathbreaking book on corruption and corruption control, The Pursuit of Absolute Integrity: How Corruption Control Makes Government Ineffective (University of Chicago Press, 1996).

Jacobs has also written books on political corruption, hate crime, gun control, and criminal records. Research for The Eternal Criminal Record was supported by a 2012–13 Guggenheim Fellowship. He has also written well over one hundred articles on diverse criminal law and criminology topics, most recently on the jurisprudential and policy issues related to gun control. Many of his articles, and several books, have been collaborations with students associated with the Center for Research in Crime and Justice. His most recent book, The Toughest Gun Control Law in the Nation, was co-authored with Zoe Fuhr, a recent NYU Law LLM graduate.

== Published works ==
- The Toughest Gun Control Law in the Nation: The Unfulfilled Promise of New York's SAFE Act (New York University Press, 2019) (with Zoe Fuhr)
- The Eternal Criminal Record (Harvard University Press, 2015)
- Breaking the Devil’s Pact: The Battle to Free the Teamsters from the Mob (New York University Press, 2011) (with Kerry Cooperman)
- Mobsters, Unions, and Feds: The Mafia and the American Labor Movement (New York University Press, 2006)
- Can Gun Control Work? (Oxford University Press, 2002)
- Gotham Unbound: How NYC Was Liberated From the Grip of Organized Crime (New York University Press, 1999) (with Coleen Friel and Robert Raddick)
- Hate Crime: Criminal Law and Identity Politics (Oxford University Press, 1998) (with Kimberly Potter)
- The Pursuit of Absolute Integrity: How Corruption Control Makes Government Ineffective (University of Chicago Press, 1996) (with Frank Anechiarico)
- Busting the Mob: United States v. Cosa Nostra (New York University Press, 1994) (with Christopher Panarella and Jay Worthington)
- Organized Crime & Its Containment: A Transatlantic Initiative (Kluwer Law and Taxation Pub., 1991) (with Cyrille Fijnaut)
- Corruption and Racketeering in the New York City Construction Industry: The Final Report of the New York State Organized Crime Task Force (New York University Press, 1990)
- Drunk Driving: An American Dilemma (University of Chicago Press, 1989)
- Socio-Legal Foundations of Civil Military-Relations (Transaction Books, 1986)
- New Perspective on Prisons and Imprisonment (Cornell University Press, 1983)
- Individual Rights and Institutional Authority: Cases and Materials (Bobbs-Merrill Co., 1979)
- Guard Unions and the Future of the Prisons (Cornell University School of Industrial and Labor Relations Press, 1978) (with Norma Crotty)
- Stateville: The Penitentiary in Mass Society (University of Chicago Press, 1977)
