= Harold Daggett =

American dockworker and union leader

Harold J. Daggett

President of the International Longshoremen's Association
- Incumbent
- Assumed office 2011
- Preceded by: Richard Hughes

Personal details
- Born: Harold J. Daggett New York City, U.S.

Harold Daggett is an American labor union leader. Since 2011, he has been president of the International Longshoremen's Association (ILA). In 2024, he was a lead figure in launching a strike by longshoremen at ports on the Atlantic and Gulf coasts of the United States.

On June 22, 2025, Daggett signed an official ILA letter praising Trump and commending his decision to bomb three of Iran's nuclear facilities. The letter has been described as "unprecedented" given how unusual it is for a labor union to endorse offensive military action. Trump shared the letter on his Truth Social account.

== Early life and career ==
Daggett was raised in Queens, New York. He was in the U.S. Navy in Vietnam before becoming a dock worker in 1967. In 1988, he become president of Port Newark mechanics local.

== International Longshoremen's Association ==
Daggett was elected president of the International Longshoremen's Association in 2011; he was elected to a third term in 2019. In 2023, Daggett earned $901,000 from the ILA, including $728,000 in base salary and $173,000 as president emeritus of ILA Local 1804–1.

Harold Daggett's son Dennis has also been an ILA official since at least 2005. As of 2024, the younger Daggett was executive vice president of the ILA, and head of the New Jersey local once led by his father.

=== Disputes with government ===
The Justice Department has lost two cases against Daggett, in which he was accused of being an associate of the Genovese crime family. In testimony at a trial in 2005, George Barone, a former Genovese "soldier" who was a Mafia enforcer before turning state's evidence, testified that Daggett was controlled by the Mafia; in his own testimony, Daggett depicted himself as a victim of the Mafia and said that Barone had threatened to kill him in 1980. Daggett and the two codefendants in the trial were found not liable in November 2005 on civil RICO charges of extortion conspiracy and fraud. One of the codefendants, Lawrence Ricci, disappeared during the trial; his body was found weeks later in a New Jersey diner decomposing with multiple gunshot wounds; the murder is still unsolved.

Daggett has frequently clashed with the Waterfront Commission, which was established in 1953 to reduce organized crime influence at the Port of New York and New Jersey. Daggett has denied that there is any substantial remaining Mob influence on the docks.

=== 2024 port strike ===
Daggett is a critic of the Joe Biden administration, and in 2024 he threatened to "cripple" the American economy before the November election via an ILA strike at ports on the Atlantic seaboard and Gulf Coasts. Daggett was a lead figure in the strike, which began on October 1, 2024. It was the first port strike on the East Coast since 1977. The ILA demanded a pay raise and a freeze to automation at East Coast and Gulf Coast ports. Longshoremen earned a top wage of $39 per hour (average American hourly wage was $28.34 at the time) and under Daggett's proposed contract, that top wage would have been moved to $69 per hour with a roughly 60% increase in pay over 6 years. The ILA also demanded a 77% increase in wages over a six-year contract.

In a house-produced video posted to the ILA's YouTube channel, Daggett said “I will cripple you, and you have no idea what that means. Nobody does,” he explained:

“When my men hit the streets from Maine to Texas, every single port locked down. You know what’s going to happen? I’ll tell you. First week, I will be all over the news every night, boom, boom, second week. Guys who sell cars can’t sell cars, because the cars ain’t coming in off the ships. They get laid off. Third week, malls are closing down. They can’t get the goods from China. They can’t sell clothes. They can’t do this. I deserve more money. Everything in the United States comes on a ship, they go out of business. Construction workers get laid off because the materials aren’t coming in. The steel’s not coming in. The lumber’s not coming in. They lose their job. Everybody’s hating my guys now because now they realize how important our jobs are.”

The strike was suspended on October 3, 2024. A tentative agreement was reached "on wages" and extending "the Master Contract until January 15, 2025 to return to the bargaining table to negotiate all other outstanding issues," the ILA and USMX said in a joint statement.

== Personal life ==
Daggett was reported in 2017 as owning a 76-foot yacht, the Obsession. He was also reported to drive a Bentley, a luxury car.
