= Pete Panto =

Italian-American union activist (1910–1939)

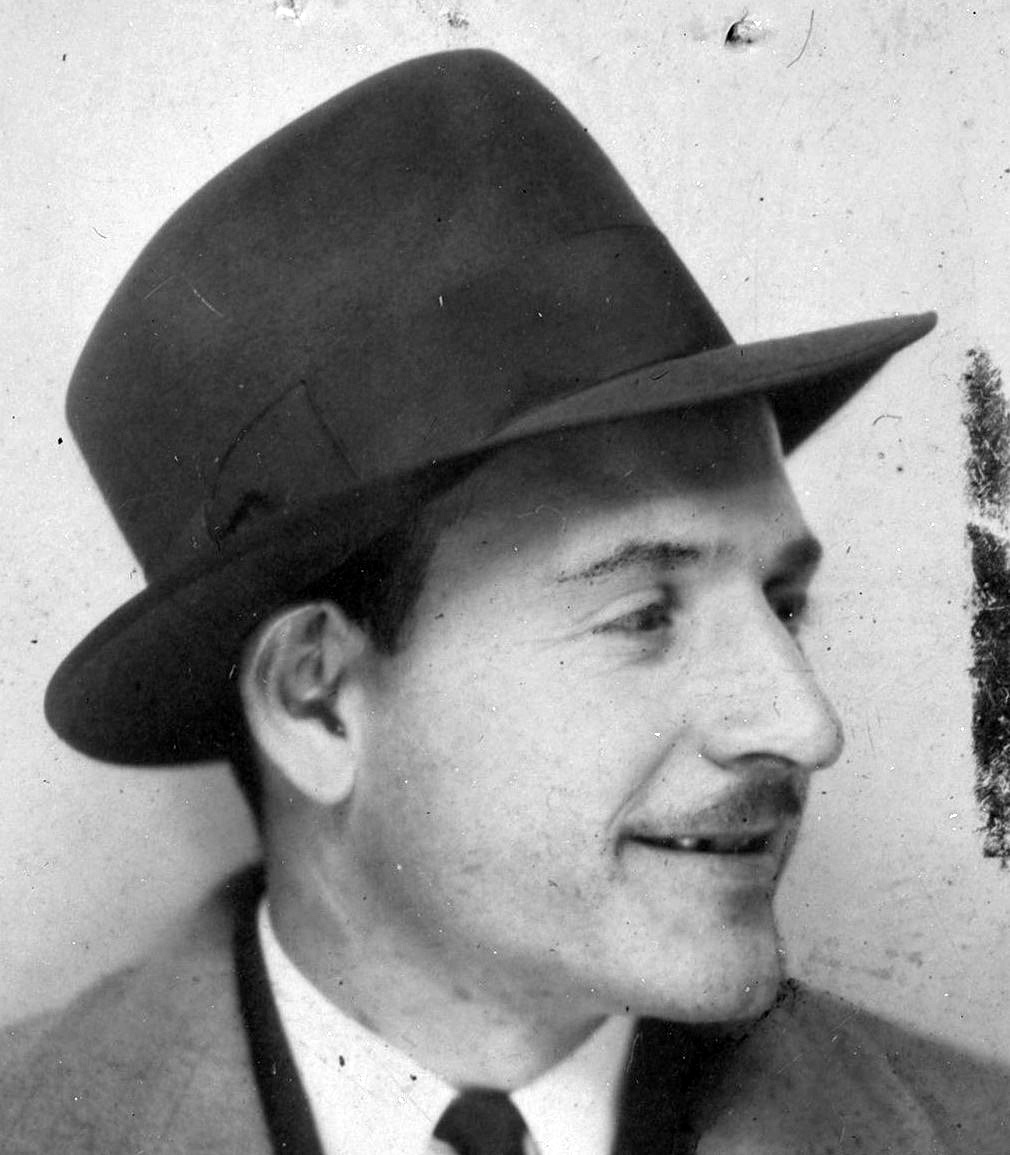
- Born: Pietro Panto; September 13, 1910; Brooklyn, New York, United States
- Died: July 14, 1939 (aged 28); United States
- Occupations: Longshoreman, union activist

Pietro "Pete" Panto (September 13, 1910 – July 14, 1939) was an Italian American longshoreman and union activist who was murdered by the mob for attempting to revolt against union leadership. Panto was born in Brooklyn and at an unknown date he left the United States, returning on June 3, 1924, on the SS President Wilson that sailed out of Naples. He left the United States again, returning on March 22, 1934, on the SS Sinaia that sailed out of Palermo. Both ship registries list 198 Sackett Street in Brooklyn as his address.

== Revolt ==
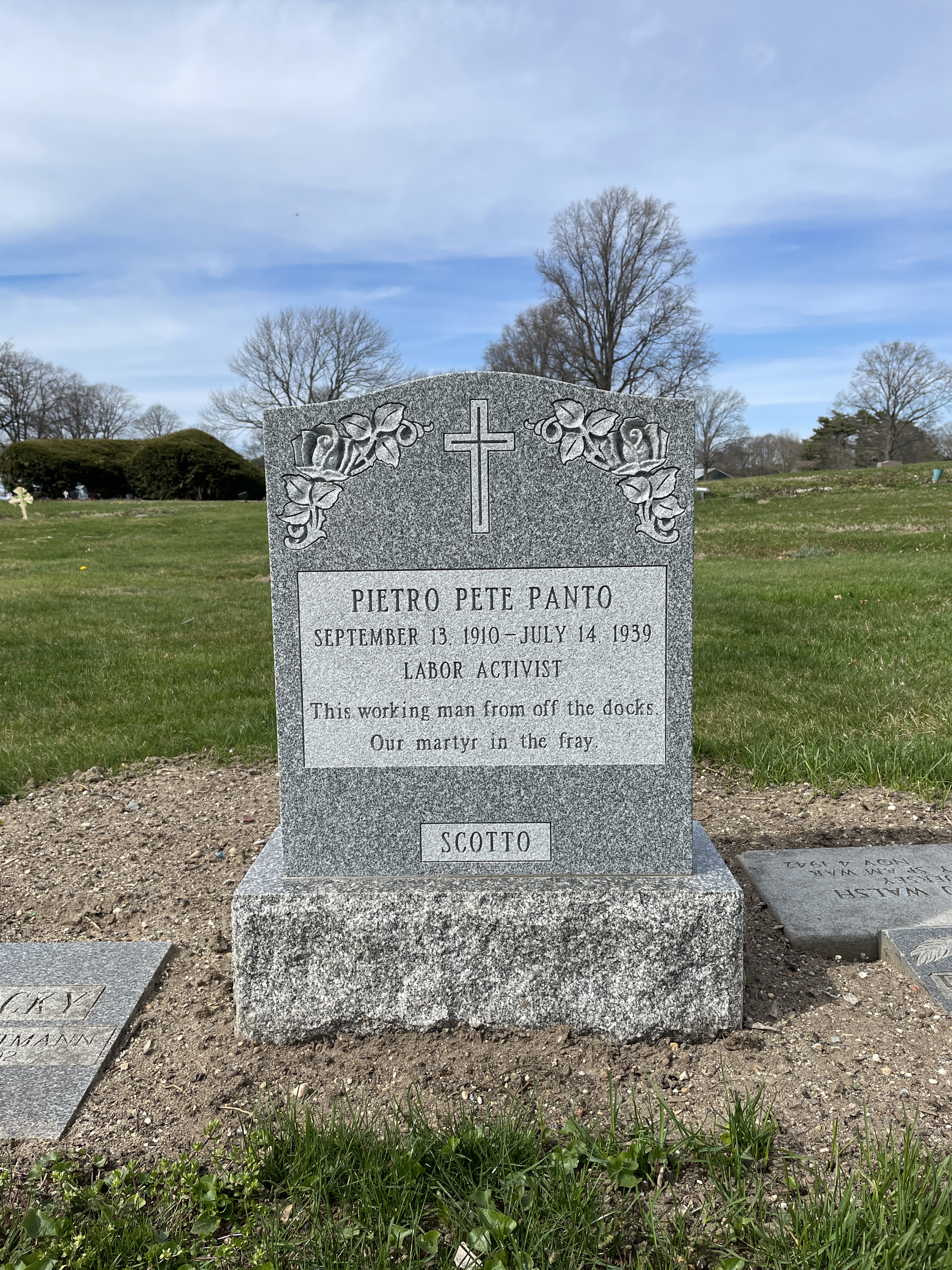
In March 2023, a tombstone was installed at Panto's unmarked grave.

Pietro "Pete" Panto was the leader of a revolt against Joseph P. Ryan and his colleagues, many of them allegedly mafia, who ran the International Longshoremen's Association (ILA). Corruption was rampant among ILA leaders and working conditions were deplorable. Panto attempted to expose this corruption via the Brooklyn Rank-and-File Committee, a group of "left wing" dockworkers. He and the Rank-And-File Committee held open air assemblies attracting over 1500 longshoreman at a time. This was a serious threat to Ryan, Anastasia, and other corrupt officials. Panto was lured from his home on July 14, 1939, following a phone call from an unknown individual, and was never seen again. His body was later found during January 1941, in a lime pit in Lyndhurst, New Jersey. Albert Anastasia was suspected of ordering the execution but Abe Reles, the chief witness, died in 1941 while supposedly trying to escape from custody. He either "jumped or fell" from a room where he was held under guard by six police officers.

Panto's murder was allegedly carried out by Mendy Weiss, Tony Romanello and James Ferraco of Murder, Inc. Although Anastasia, Weiss, Romanello and Ferraco were never indicted, Weiss would receive the electric chair in 1944 for a separate murder, whereas Anastasia was murdered by rival mobsters in 1957. Romanello was arrested and questioned in 1942. A few months after his release from custody his dead body was found along the banks of the Brandywine Creek near Wilmington, Delaware. James Ferraco had vanished without a trace and was most likely killed in 1940 or 1941. Ryan resigned in 1953, following New York State Industrial Commissioner Edward Corsi and Governor Thomas E. Dewey's investigation into corruption charges.

In 2022, scholar Joseph Sciorra led a fundraising campaign for a tombstone at Panto's unmarked grave, which was installed in March 2023.

== Cultural references ==
- The Hook, an unproduced screenplay by Arthur Miller, portrays Panto's "doomed attempt to overthrow the feudal gangsterism of the New York docks".

== See also ==
- List of solved missing person cases (pre-1950)
- List of unsolved murders (1900–1979)
- On the Waterfront
