= United States Maritime Alliance =

- Abbreviation: USMX
- Formation: 1997; 29 years ago
- Type: Delaware Nonprofit organization
- Legal status: Trade association
- Headquarters: Lyndhurst, New Jersey, U.S.
- Region served: East Coast and Gulf Coast
- Chairman & CEO: F. Paul De Maria
- Website: www.usmx.com

The United States Maritime Alliance (USMX) is an American alliance of container shipping lines, port operators and other employers in the longshore industry for the larger seaports of the East and Gulf coasts of the United States. Its mission is “to preserve and protect the interests of its members in matters associated with the maritime industry including all labor relations issues”. The alliance was founded in 1997.

USMX members handle cargo shipped to and from the United States. The alliance represents its constituents in labor contracts vis-a-vis the International Longshoremen’s Association (ILA). In addition, it oversees training, education, and certification programs, and voices the positions of its members regarding regulatory and safety issues. It also administers fringe benefit funds and programs. The alliance works with the various governmental port authorities that provide infrastructure and development, safety, and lease space to the port operators. The alliance is a Delaware non-profit organization, headquartered in Lyndhurst, New Jersey, with F. Paul De Maria as Chairman and CEO.

The equivalent to the USMX for the West coast is the Pacific Maritime Association (PMA).

== Master contracts ==
USMX and ILA negotiate Master contracts that typically last six years. The last Master contract with ILA began on October 1, 2018, and expired on September 30, 2024. After a three-day strike in October, workers returned to their jobs on October 4. Wage issues were settled but negotiations about outstanding matters will continue while the Master Contract was extended to January 15, 2025. A major unsettled problem is the use of automation in the industry.

== Members ==
These corporations and enterprises are members of the USMX (incomplete list):

- Container carriers, such as Maersk, Mediterranean Shipping Company, CMA CGM, Hapag-Lloyd, and Evergreen.
- Port operators and employers of longshoremen, such as APM Terminals, Ports America, Maher Terminals, Global Container Terminals, and SSA Marine.

== Ports ==
USMX interacts with the following major ports and their authorities:

- Port of Boston, Massachusetts
- Port Authority of New York and New Jersey
- Port of Philadelphia, Pennsylvania
- Port of Wilmington, Delaware
- Port of Baltimore, Maryland
- Port of Virginia, Virginia
- Port of Wilmington, North Carolina
- Port of Charleston, South Carolina
- Port of Savannah, Georgia
- JAXPort, Florida
- Port of Palm Beach, Florida
- Port Everglades, Florida
- Port of Miami, Florida
- Port of Mobile, Alabama
- Port of New Orleans, Louisiana
- Port of Houston, Texas

== See also ==
- Containerization
- List of largest container shipping companies
