= Walter Bailey (lawyer) =

American politician

Walter Bailey is former state prosecutor and member of the town council for Summerville, South Carolina. He represented the town's third district. In late July and early August 2010, he proposed and successfully passed a town ordinance that effectively bars illegal aliens from living or working in the town.

Prior to running for town council, Bailey was the first circuit solicitor for South Carolina. He was assigned the Charleston Five case after the state Attorney General, Charlie Condon removed himself as the prosecutor.

In 2003, Bailey retired from the office of solicitor. Governor Mark Sanford appointed Robby Robbins to replace Bailey.
