= John Bowers (unionist) =

American labor union leader (1922–2011)

John M. Bowers (November 11, 1922 – August 21, 2011) was an American labor union leader.

== Biography ==
Born in New York City on November 11, 1922, Bowers served as a radio operator in the United States Army during World War II. After the war, he followed in a family tradition by becoming a longshoreman, and also joined the International Longshoremen's Association (ILA). He was a leading supporter of the union during its rivalry with the International Brotherhood of Longshoremen, and this led in 1954 to his election as president of his union local. In the role, he established a seniority system in hiring.

In 1963, Bowers was elected as executive vice president of the union. Although he supported union president Teddy Gleason, he was not seen as a supporter of the corruption which took place under Gleason's presidency. In 1987, he succeeded Gleason as president. As leader of the union, he unsuccessfully attempted to get the International Longshore and Warehouse Union to merge into the ILA. He negotiated several long-term contracts for longshoremen on the U.S. East Coast, and created the Container Freight Station Operations, which brought union members onto new types of work with containers. However, union membership fell, and he was criticized for his salary, eventually more than $500,000 a year.

Bowers retired in 2007, becoming president emeritus of the union. He died four years later, on August 21, 2011, at the age of 88.

Trade union offices
Preceded by Teddy Gleason	President of the International Longshoremen's Association; 1987–2007	Succeeded by Richard Hughes
