= International Longshoreman's Association Hall =

- U.S. National Register of Historic Places
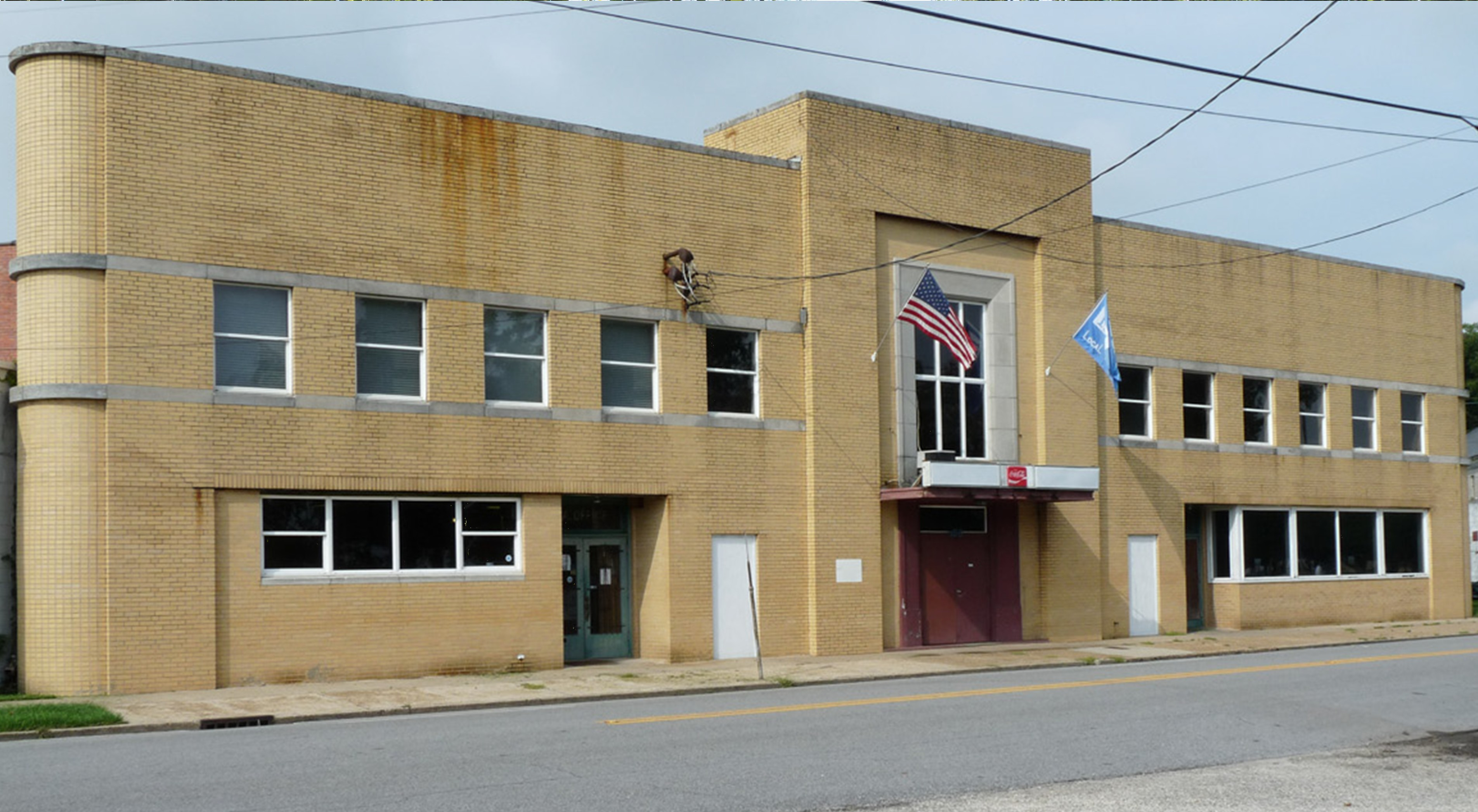
- International Longshoreman's Association Hall in 2011

- Location within Mobile, Alabama Location within Alabama Location within the United States
- Location: 505 Martin Luther King Jr. Drive; Mobile, Alabama, United States
- Coordinates: 30°41′39″N 88°2′58″W
- Built: 1949
- Architectural style: Art Moderne
- NRHP reference No.: 11000408
- Added to NRHP: June 27, 2011

The International Longshoreman's Association Hall is a historic labor union meeting hall in Mobile, Alabama. The International Longshoremen's Association established the Mobile chapter in 1936 in order to represent the city's African American longshoremen. The hall was built in 1949 in the Art Moderne style. Many prominent African-American entertainers performed in its auditorium. It became a gathering place during the Civil Rights Movement. On January 1, 1959, it became the only place in Mobile to host a speaking engagement by Martin Luther King Jr. It was added to the National Register of Historic Places on June 27, 2011.
