= Brown v. Hotel and Restaurant Employees =

- Supreme Court of the United States

Argued March 26, 1984 Decided July 2, 1984
- Full case name: Brown, Director, Department of Law and Public Safety, Division of Gaming Enforcement, State of New Jersey, et al. v. Hotel & Restaurant Employees & Bartenders International Union Local 54 et al.
- Citations: 468 U.S. 491 (more) 104 S. Ct. 3179; 82 L. Ed. 2d 373; 1984 U.S. LEXIS 142; 52 U.S.L.W. 5042; 101 Lab. Cas. (CCH) ¶ 11,059; 5 Employee Benefits Cas. (BNA) 1585; 116 L.R.R.M. 2921

Case history
- Prior: Hotel and Restaurant Employees v. Danzinger, 536 F. Supp. 317 (D.N.J. 1982); reversed, 709 F.2d 815 (3d Cir. 1983); probable jurisdiction noted, 464 U.S. 990 (1983).
- Subsequent: Case remanded to the Court of Appeals with instructions to remand to the District Court for further proceedings

Holding
- New Jersey's Casino Control Act, which imposed qualification standards on casino industry union officials, is not pre-empted by the National Labor Relations Act

Court membership
- Chief Justice Warren E. Burger Associate Justices William J. Brennan Jr. · Byron White; Thurgood Marshall · Harry Blackmun; Lewis F. Powell Jr. · William Rehnquist; John P. Stevens · Sandra Day O'Connor

Case opinions
- Majority: O'Connor, joined by Burger, Blackmun, Rehnquist
- Dissent: White, joined by Powell, Stevens
- Brennan, Marshall took no part in the consideration or decision of the case.

Laws applied
- Casino Control Act, N.J. Stat. Ann. Section 5:12-1 et seq.; National Labor Relations Act

Brown v. Hotel and Restaurant Employees, 468 U.S. 491 (1984), is a 4-to-3 ruling by the United States Supreme Court which held that a New Jersey state gaming law requiring union leaders to be of good moral character was not preempted by the National Labor Relations Act (NLRA).

== Background ==
In 1976, New Jersey amended their state constitution to permit casino gambling in Atlantic City.

On June 2, 1977, Governor Brendan Byrne signed the Casino Control Act (N.J. Stat. Ann. Section 5:12-1 et seq.) into law. The act established the New Jersey Casino Control Commission and instituted comprehensive regulation of casino gambling—including the regulation of labor unions representing gaming industry employees. In an attempt to forestall organized crime influence over labor unions, Sections 86 and 93 of the act imposed certain qualifications on officials of labor organizations representing casino industry workers. Among these qualifications were that the official be of "good moral character," not been convicted of certain felonies, and was not associated with organized crime. If a labor union's leaders did not meet these criteria, the union was prohibited from collecting or receiving dues from its members and from administering pension and welfare funds.

Hotel Employees and Restaurant Employees Union Local 54 represented about 12,000 workers, 10,000 of whom were employed in Atlantic City casinos. Almost all of these casino workers had been organized since the legalization of gambling in the state.

On May 13, 1981, the Casino Control Commission found that Frank Gerace, president of Local 54, and Frank Materio, the local's grievance manager, were associated with organized crime. The commission also ruled that Karlos LaSane, the union's business agent, was ineligible to be a union officer or agent because he had previously been convicted of extortion. The commission also found that union officers refused to cooperate with Casino Control Commission investigators, and held stock in Resorts International, Inc. (which owned one of the casinos in which Local 54 represented workers). Both actions contravened state regulations. The commission feared that Local 54 was being influenced by Nicodemo "Little Nicky" Scarfo, a reputed leader of the Scarfo organized crime "family" based in Philadelphia.

National and state AFL–CIO officials, fearing the New Jersey law might open the door to extensive new state regulation of labor unions, asked Local 54 to test the New Jersey law in court. After a regulatory appeal, the Casino Control Commission unanimously rejected the union's contention that the law was unconstitutional and preempted by the NLRA.

Local 54 then filed suit in federal district court, seeking a permanent injunction prohibiting enforcement of the act. At trial, the union argued that the law infringed on its members' constitutional right of freedom of association and was preempted by federal labor law. The state countered that the regulation was a permissible infringement of the freedom of association because keeping criminal elements out of the gaming industry was a compelling governmental interest.

On March 22, 1982, the United States District Court for the District of New Jersey held that the New Jersey statute was not unconstitutionally vague and did not impermissibly infringe on union members' First Amendment rights.

The union appealed.

While the appeal was pending, the Casino Control Commission ordered Gerace and Materio to vacate their union positions. The commission demanded that both men relinquish their union offices by October 12, 1982, or the local would not be permitted to collect dues or administer its pension plan.

On June 30, 1983, a three-judge panel of the United States Court of Appeals for the Third Circuit ruled 2-to-1 that the district court had erred. The appellate court granted the union's injunction, finding that Section 93 of the act was preempted by Section 7 of the NLRA. The Court of Appeals relied heavily on the Supreme Court's decision in Hill v. Florida ex rel. Watson, 325 U.S. 538 (1945), when it concluded that Section 7 conferred "an unfettered right on employees to choose the officials of their own bargaining representatives."

The state sought a rehearing en banc, but the entire court of appeals refused to rehear the case after it deadlocked in a 5-to-5 vote.

The state appealed to the U.S. Supreme Court, which granted certiorari (464 U.S. 990 (1983)).

== Decision ==
Justice Sandra Day O'Connor delivered the opinion of the Court, in which Chief Justice Burger and Justices Harry Blackmun and William Rehnquist joined. Justice Byron White, joined by Justices Lewis F. Powell, Jr. and John Paul Stevens, dissented. Justices William J. Brennan, Jr. and Thurgood Marshall did not participate in the hearing or decision of the case.

=== Majority opinion ===
Justice O'Connor concluded that Section 7 of the NLRA did not contain explicit pre-emptive language nor indicate congressional intent to usurp a state role in labor-management relations. "[A]ppropriate consideration for the vitality of our federal system and for a rational allocation of functions belies any easy inference that Congress intended to deprive the States of their ability to retain jurisdiction over such matters."

O'Connor then rejected the appellate court's reading of Hill v. Florida ex rel. Watson. Subsequent to Hill, O'Connor noted, Congress had enacted the Labor Management Reporting and Disclosure Act (the "Landrum-Griffin Act"). Section 504(a) of the Landrum-Griffin Act explicitly barred from office for a five-year period union officers convicted of any number of crimes. By enacting Section 504(a), O'Connor concluded, Congress "unmistakably indicated that the right of employees to select the officers of their bargaining representatives is not absolute..." Citing the plurality opinion in De Veau v. Braisted, O'Connor noted that the Court had previously held that the Landrum-Griffin Act had not preempted the role of state legislation in regulating union officials.

O'Connor next addressed the New Jersey statute's enforcement mechanism. O'Connor recognized the continuing controlling nature of Hill in this regard, and acknowledged that questions of constitutionality and preemption must "be assessed independently in terms of its potential conflict with the federal enactment." O'Connor concluded, however, that the record was too incomplete on this issue, and remanded the issue to the appellate court so that it could order further proceedings.

=== Dissenting opinion ===
Justice White, writing for the dissent, argued that the linkage between Section 93 and Section 86 of the New Jersey act rendered the act preempted by federal law. If Section 86 merely imposed qualifications on union officials, White concluded, the law would not be preempted by the NLRA. But the act went far beyond that, and imposed sweeping penalties on the union. For the dissent, this proved critical:

It is not clear what portion of the statute the Court upholds since it expressly refuses to decide whether the dues prohibition and fund administration provisions are valid. Section 93(b) does nothing more than impose those two restrictions on unions whose officials are disqualified under the criteria set forth in § 86. It does not, by its terms, provide a mechanism for disqualifying any union officer. Therefore, while it appears that the Court holds that a State is free to disqualify certain individuals from acting as union officials as long as it does not impose sanctions on the union itself, it is not clear that anything in § 93(b) enables the State to do that.

White noted that although Section 7 of the NLRA granted employees the absolute right to choose collective bargaining representatives of their choosing, that right was not coextensive with the less absolute right to determine who should serve as officers in that organization. In the current case, White noted, the workers had chosen an organization rather than an individual as their collective bargaining agent. White agreed with the majority that the state can permissibly impose qualifications on the officers of Local 54. But the language of Section 7 of the NLRA as well as the Court's ruling in Hill permitted the state to impose sanctions only on the officers, not on the union. Interfering with the relatively untrammeled right of the union to carry out its duties as collective bargaining agent was impermissible as a matter of federal law:

Allowing the State to so restrict the union's conduct infringes on the employees' right to bargain collectively through the representative of their own choosing because it prevents that representative from functioning as a collective-bargaining agent. ... A union which cannot sustain itself financially obviously cannot effectively engage in collective-bargaining activities on behalf of its members.

The record, White noted, was quite clear in showing that Local 54 would not be able to function if either of the Casino Control Commission's sanctions were imposed. Thus, White would have overturned the statute on grounds of preemption under Section 7 of the NLRA:

I am willing to hold that, as a matter of law, a statute like § 93(b), which prohibits a union from collecting dues from its members, impairs the union's ability to represent those members to such an extent that it infringes on their § 7 right to bargain through the representative of their choice.

== Consequences of the ruling ==
Gerace resigned shortly after the Supreme Court's ruling. However, Local 54 immediately rehired Gerace as a $48,000-a-year "consultant." The Casino Control Commission declared this "a subterfuge." The gaming commission declined to impose either of its statutory sanctions, and instead sought a court injunction forcing Gerace to resign his consultancy. In November 1984, a New Jersey state superior court ruled that the gaming commission had the right to force Gerace's resignation. Gerace initially fought the court's order, but eventually resigned after concluding that the continuing legal battle would "be disruptive to the operation of the union." Materio and LaSane also resigned, but were later hired by the union as business agents to handle non-casino related matters.

Five years after the ruling in Brown v. Hotel and Restaurant Employees an academic study concluded that the Casino Control Act had been only marginally successful in preventing or eliminating organized crime influence in New Jersey's casino unions. The study noted that the law had not been used since its initial 1981 enforcement action, and that many union officials were merely rehired as consultants rather than as elected officers. The state gaming commission never again attempted to use its two statutory sanctions against any union, and relied instead on the threat of injunctions to remove officials it suspected of links to organized crime.

== See also ==
- List of United States Supreme Court cases, volume 468
