= International Longshoremen's Association =

North American labor union

ILA
- International Longshoremen's Association
- The traditional logo of the ILA, depicting a vintage swallowtail flag
- Founded: 1892
- Headquarters: North Bergen, New Jersey
- Location: United States, Canada
- Members: 65,000 (2019)
- Key people: Harold Daggett, President
- Affiliations: AFL–CIO, CLC, ITF
- Website: www.ilaunion.org

The International Longshoremen's Association (ILA) is a North American labor union representing longshore workers along the East Coast of the United States and Atlantic Canada, the Gulf Coast, the Great Lakes, Puerto Rico, and inland waterways; the ILA has approximately 200 local affiliates in port cities in these areas. The International Longshore and Warehouse Union is dominant on the West Coast, western Canada, Alaska, and Hawaii.

== History of the ILA ==
=== Origins ===
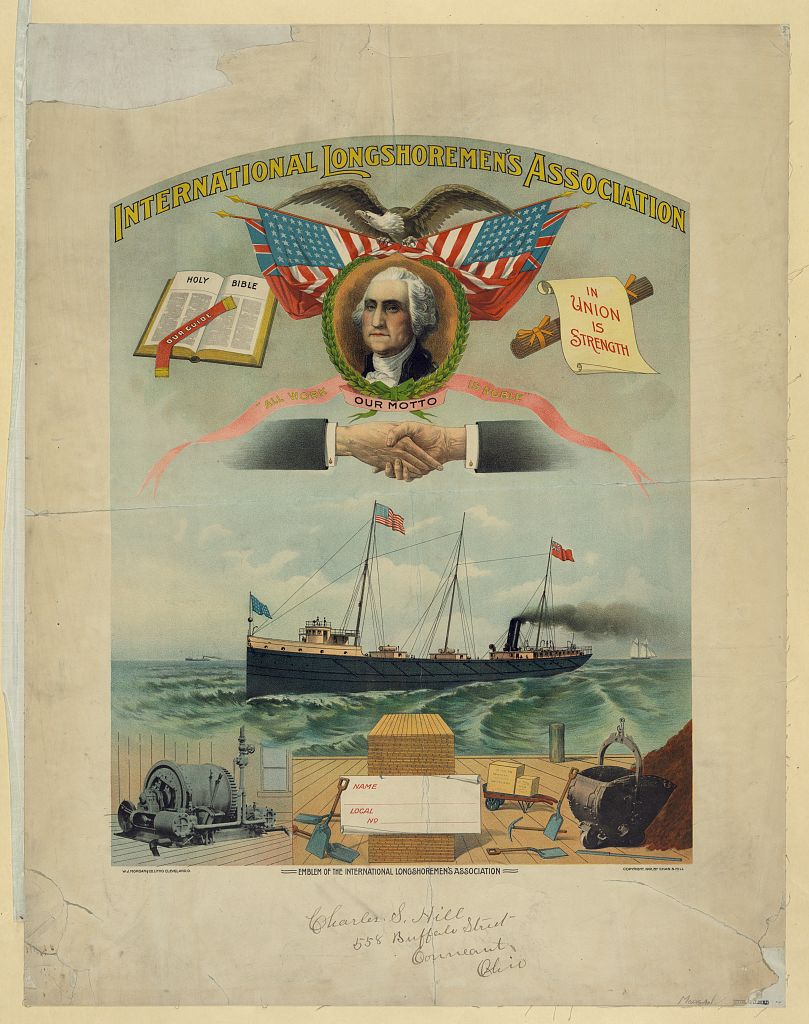
ILA banner c. 1901, showcasing George Washington, a Bible, a steamboat, and mottos such as "All Work is Noble" and "In Union Is Strength"

While longshoremen in the United States had organized and conducted strikes before there was a United States, the first modern longshoremen's union, the Longshoremen's Union Protective Association (LUPA), was formed in the port of New York in 1864. It was later absorbed by the ILA.

The ILA traces its origins to a union of longshoremen on the Great Lakes: the Association of Lumber Handlers, founded in 1877, then renamed the National Longshoremen's Association of the United States in 1892. It joined the American Federation of Labor (AFL) in 1895 and renamed itself the International Longshoremen's Association several years later, when it admitted Canadian longshoremen to membership, and later was briefly known as the International Longshoremen, Marine and Transport Workers' Association when it sought to extend its jurisdiction to include workers in the industries whose goods they handled.

Organized and led by an Irish tugboat worker named Daniel Keefe, the organization had as many as 100,000 members on the Great Lakes, the East Coast, the West Coast, and the Gulf Coast in 1905. From the outset, Keefe faced significant challenges, most notably the outright hostility of Chicago's influential industrialists to unions and the traditional anti-union leanings of longshore recruits from small Midwestern towns. Nevertheless, Keefe successfully expanded membership in the newborn union to include large numbers of dockworkers.

=== The Early Twentieth Century ===
As the start of the twentieth century loomed, the ILA had approximately 50,000 members, almost all on the Great Lakes. By 1905, membership had doubled to 100,000, half of which were scattered throughout the rest of the country. ILA leaders focused on eliminating independent stevedoring firms and securing closed shop contracts. Keefe bargained with employers, guaranteeing uninterrupted work in return for badly needed improvements in working conditions and wage increases.

Keefe retired as President of the ILA in 1908, succeeded by another Great Lakes tugboat man, T.V. O'Connor. O'Connor's presidency spanned twelve of the ILA's most tumultuous years. In 1909, a bitter three-year strike on the Great Lakes pitted the employers' Lake Carriers Association against every maritime union except the ILA, whose locals voted against participation because it was clear to them that the strike was a losing battle. So powerful and well equipped was the Lake Carriers Association that Lakes shipping ran almost regularly despite the union walkout. In the end, the ILA was almost alone on the Lakes.

The 1914 absorption of LUPA into the ILA prompted the creation of the ILA's New York District Council and ignited an intense period of growth for the union, both in terms of size and power. The organization of coastwise longshoremen in 1916 was a significant victory that greatly improved the ILA's position in negotiations: shippers no longer had the option of diverting freight from striking ports along the Atlantic. A similar coastwide strike also occurred on the West Coast in 1916, but ended in defeat for the Union.

As the ILA grew, power shifted increasingly to the Port of New York, where the International established its branch headquarters. There Joseph P. Ryan was organizing longshoremen as an officer of the ILA's New York District Council and, in 1918, as president of the ILA's "Atlantic Coast District".

The ILA in New York faced a number of internal divisions. While New York longshoremen were predominantly Irish-American for the latter part of the 19th century and the early years of the 20th, making up 95% of the workers on the New York docks as of 1880, employers began hiring Italian immigrants and African-Americans as strikebreakers as early as 1887, then retaining them in later years as a means of dividing workers and discouraging strikes. By the turn of the century the ILA had separate Italian, Greek, African-American, German and Irish local unions in New York, reflecting the hiring patterns in the industry, in which foremen typically hired members of their ethnic group.

In 1912 Italian-Americans made up roughly a third of the workforce, primarily in Brooklyn, while the Irish dominated the Chelsea docks in Manhattan. Irish dockworkers also had more of the dock and deck jobs in Manhattan, leaving the harder work in the hold to others; Italian dockworkers did the same in Brooklyn, spurning the dirty work of unloading banana boats, which fell to Black dockworkers instead.

The ILA was also riven by internal factionalism. This came to the fore in 1919 when longshoremen throughout the New York-New Jersey Harbor struck in protest of an arbitration award that gave them raises of only five cents an hour for straight time work and ten cents per hour for overtime—what strikers dismissed as "the Woolworth raise"—instead of the thirty-five cent raise that the Union had sought. The ILA's International President T.V. O'Connor, who had reluctantly accepted the award, denounced the strike, which he blamed on radicals from the Maritime Transport Workers' Industrial Union (MTW), an arm of the Industrial Workers of the World (IWW). O'Connor's most serious opposition, however, did not come from the IWW, but from equally conservative members of the ILA leadership and rivals who had been part of LUPA. They succeeded in pushing O'Connor aside, then, having achieved their personal political goals, urged members to return to work while they pursued talks as part of a Special Conciliation Commission appointed by the Mayor. The strike, which was already collapsing as some local unions returned to work, achieved nothing.

In addition the ILA faced external competition, particularly from the IWW, which had a number of members on the West Coast, where many workers moved into longshoring from other centers of IWW strength, such as the lumber and mining industries. The IWW was also strong in Philadelphia during these years, despite efforts to convict the leaders of Local 8 of the IWW on charges of espionage during World War I and the prosecution and conviction of many of the IWW's national leaders in 1919. An employer lockout in 1922 largely destroyed the organization.

The ILA likewise faced strong from opposition from employers. The shipping companies on the West Coast, where a few lines dominated the industry, took a particularly hard line, demanding the open shop as early as 1914. Their intransigence may well have encouraged the growth of the MTW, as well as the influence of IWW radicals within the ILA on the West Coast.

In 1921, ILA president Thomas V. O'Connor resigned. Anthony Chlopek, the last of the Great Lakes presidents, was elected ILA International president and Ryan served as his First Vice president for the six years of Chlopek's presidency. Perhaps the most significant development during Chlopek's term was the institution of the Prohibition Enforcement Law. Ryan was elected International president in 1927.

=== The Great Depression and the Revival of the ILA ===
Longshore work, particularly in the port of New York where thousands of longshoremen worked only a day or less in an average week, was largely casual and irregular; many workers earned less than what authorities considered the minimum necessary to support a family. Longshore work became even more precarious during the Great Depression, as masses of unemployed workers seeking longshore work nearly doubled the available pool of workers. Employers took advantage of these conditions to reduce wages further and establish company unions.

The ILA responded to the crisis by taking advantage of two newly-enacted federal laws: the Norris–LaGuardia Act) of 1932, which limits the use of federal court injunctions to prevent strikes and picketing, and the Wagner Act, which protects the rights of workers to organize unions and to strike to obtain their demands. Membership soared, increasing as much as sixfold in as many years in some districts.

=== Secession of the West Coast Locals ===
The process of rebuilding the union was not without hurdles. Ryan and the union's regional and local leaders regained much of the lost ground, but often at the cost of diminished centralization. The most dramatic example of this was on the Pacific coast.

The ILA Pacific Coast District was led by the left-leaning Harry Bridges and his associates, known as the "Albion Hall group", who rebelled against Ryan's leadership during the 1934 West Coast longshore strike. A network of union activists largely circumvented Ryan during the strike, first organizing the membership to reject the contract that Ryan had negotiated, then leading a strike over his objections. Bridges and other veterans of the strike replaced Ryan loyalists in union elections up and down the West Coast following the strike.

Ryan never trusted Bridges, even though he was forced to make him an International officer in recognition of his de facto power on the West Coast. Ryan fired Bridges in 1936, however, after Bridges launched an East Coast speaking tour in support of the left-wing sailors' union, the National Maritime Union, with which Ryan had unfriendly relations. Bridges subsequently took all but three of the ILA's West Coast locals out of the ILA to form the International Longshore and Warehouse Union, which joined the Congress of Industrial Organizations shortly thereafter.

=== The ILA During World War II and the Postwar Years ===
The war had unexpected effects on the ILA's members' relations with both their employers and their union. On the one hand, the ILA, in the name of aiding the war effort, relaxed the rules that had restricted the size of loads that longshoremen could handle, making work harder and more dangerous. On the other hand, as more and more workers left the docks either to enlist or to find other jobs in the defense industry, the remaining workers received more steady work and less of the casual daily work offered through the shapeup. These workers were more willing to launch wildcat strikes and other challenges to their employers and the ILA leadership.

This new defiance boiled over in October 1945, as returning veterans played a key role in a citywide wildcat strike to reject the contract negotiated by Ryan. ILA members went out on another wildcat strike in 1947, then again in 1948 and again in 1951.

=== Investigations into Mob Involvement in the ILA ===
Organized crime figures had been involved in the longshore industry and the ILA from the early years of the twentieth century. Paul Vaccarelli, an Italian immigrant who boxed under the name "Paul Kelly", led the Five Points Gang, a largely Irish-American street gang from the Five Points neighborhood of Southern Manhattan, with protection from Tammany Hall. Vaccarelli was also a Vice-President of the ILA who took over leadership of the rank-and-file rebellion against the "Woolworth raise" in 1919.

In the next generation Eddie McGrath, an Irish-American gangster who worked as an enforcer for the ILA on the Hell's Kitchen waterfront and controlled the docks on the West Side of Manhattan in the 1930s and 1940s, became an important liaison within the ILA to organized crime figures. He was a close ally of powerful organized crime figures such as Joe Adonis, Albert Anastasia, and Meyer Lansky.

Individuals who would go on to become important figures in the American Mafia began infiltrating the ILA in those early years. Emil Camarda, a cousin of Vincent Mangano, took over six Brooklyn longshore locals; he later became an International Vice-President of the ILA.

Vincent Mangano was the head of one of the Five Families that controlled much of organized crime in New York. Anthony Anastasio, a member of the Mangano crime family, was the President of ILA Local 1814, the largest local within the ILA; he also became an International Vice-President of the ILA in 1937. Anastasio's brother, Albert Anastasia, was head of the organization known as Murder, Inc., as well as serving as Mangano's underboss and his eventual successor as head of the Mangano crime family after Mangano's disappearance in 1951.

Anthony Scotto, Anastasio's son-in-law, succeeded him as President of Local 1814 upon Anastasio's death in 1963 and later became the ILA general organizer, one of the three highest positions in the ILA. Paul Castellano, then head of the Gambino family, was intercepted by a federal wiretap explaining to Thomas Gambino and Thomas Bilotti about Scotto that,

We respected him ... It was our union ... We were making him advance in our union ... Go up, up, up ... the ladder. And ... what's gonna happen, we're gonna have a president.

That plan to make Scotto International President was prevented, however, by his conviction for accepting bribes from waterfront employers and related racketeering charges.

After Castellano's murder in 1985, new family boss John Gotti replaced Scotto with another mobster from Brooklyn's Red Hook neighborhood, Anthony Ciccone. Ciccone later agreed to resign his posts with Local 1841 as part of a consent decree to resolve the federal government's RICO suit against Scotto, Local 1814 and other individuals and ILA locals; this decree also barred Ciccone from participating in any ILA or waterfront activities. In 2003 Ciccone was convicted on charges of exerting illegal control over ILA locals 1 and 1814, in violation of the 1991 consent decree, as well as related RICO charges.

The Genovese crime family took on a greater role in ILA and waterfront affairs as the industry relocated in the 1970s from Manhattan and Brooklyn to the Staten Island and New Jersey docks, which could handle the new shipping containers more efficiently. The US government has twice attempted, but failed, to prove that Harold Daggett, the International President of the ILA, was a Genovese associate. Daggett has denied that there is any substantial remaining Mob influence on the docks.

The waterfront provided multiple sources of income for the Mafia. They would extract tribute from shipping companies by threatening to prevent cargo from being loaded or unloaded. They also received kickbacks from ILA members through their control of the working foremen appointed by the union who would choose which workers to hire through the shapeup, in which casual workers were hired on a daily basis. That also gave the mob leverage to squeeze longshoremen who depended on that foreman for work by requiring them to take out loans at usurious rates if they wanted to be hired. Finally, they could use their influence within a local union to create no-show jobs for their associates and loot the local's treasury and benefit funds. The Mafia also used violence to eliminate opponents within the Union: Pete Panto, an outspoken critic of Ryan, was reportedly killed on Anastasia's orders in 1939, while McGrath and his associates assaulted and sometimes killed others.

These practices received widespread attention in 1952 after the board of inquiry appointed by New York State Industrial Commissioner Edward Corsi to investigate the causes of the 1951 wildcat strike released its report, detailing the pervasive role that organized crime played in the ILA's affairs. Governor Thomas E. Dewey ordered his New York State Crime Commission to conduct a full investigation of the ILA; it held public hearings regarding conditions on the New York waterfront. The states of New York and New Jersey subsequently created the Waterfront Commission of New York Harbor in 1953 to oversee the waterfront.

=== Expulsion from and Return to the American Federation of Labor ===
Following these public hearings, in February, 1953, the Executive Council of the AFL demanded, under the threat of expulsion, that the ILA take appropriate steps to eliminate corruption. The Council's view was that the testimony before the Crime Commission provided clear and definite indication that the worker members in the Port of New York were being exploited and were not receiving the protection which they had a right to expect. The Executive Council singled out the evils stemming from the "shape-up" method of hiring, the acceptance of gifts and bribes by union officers from employers, the prevalence of union officers with criminal records, and the lack of democracy in the local unions. The Executive Council did not hold any hearings of its own.

After an exchange of correspondence and the appearance of ILA representatives before the Executive Council, the Council concluded that ILA had failed to take the necessary remedial action to eliminate the condemned conditions. The ILA was advised that the Council would recommend to the AFL Annual Convention that the ILA be suspended until it had taken the necessary action to comply in good faith with the Council's request.

At the AFL Annual Convention held in September, 1953, on the recommendation of the Executive Council, the ILA's charter was revoked by a vote of 79,079 to 736. The AFL declared that the ILA had "permitted gangsters, racketeers and thugs to fasten themselves to the body of its organization, infecting it with corruption and destroying its integrity, its effectiveness and its trade-union character".

While Ryan had been named "Lifetime President" in 1945, he resigned in 1953, following the ILA's expulsion from the AFL. Captain William V. Bradley was elected to the presidency of the ILA-Independent at the November 1953 convention.

At this same Convention the AFL voted to charter a new organization, the International Brotherhood of Longshoremen (IBL), to organize longshoremen and, in particular, those represented by the ILA. In response the ILA sent Thomas "Teddy" Gleason, ILA General Organizer, from port to port nationwide.

Meanwhile, 17,000 longshoremen voted in the National Labor Relations Board (NLRB) election on December 24 and 25, 1953 to determine which union would represent longshoremen in the Port of New York. The ILA was victorious, but Governor Dewey immediately initiated a campaign to overturn the election results.

Tension on the New York piers was mounting. ILA loyalists and many other longshoremen were at best suspicious of the IBL, which they viewed as a tool of the Waterfront Commission and a scab union—an organization of workers perceived as having a role in strikebreaking. By early March 1954, the storm finally hit when Teamster President Dave Beck was perceived as betraying the ILA by refusing to cross an IBL picket line. News spread and on piers up and down Manhattan ILA longshoremen refused to handle Teamster deliveries and walked off the docks in a wildcat strike.

An NLRB injunction forbade ILA leaders from striking or disrupting freight transportation. Violence erupted as the IBL, facilitated by the police and Beck's Teamsters, smashed picket lines. Then the NLRB examiner effectively overturned the December elections. This proved to be the last straw, for less than a week later, Bradley made the ILA strike official. Other unions and workers supported the ILA, including a major Teamsters local, which indicated Beck's opposition to the ILA strikers was not shared throughout the rest of the Teamsters.

The balance of power began to shift as Gleason gained ground against the IBL and longshoremen along the coast refused to handle diverted cargo. Dewey's anti-ILA entourage responded to the shift with a series of legal actions. Then, the NLRB officially set aside the results of the December elections and called for a new vote. The final blow, however, was the NLRB's announcement that the ILA would be banned from future elections unless it ended the work stoppage "forthwith". Bradley had no choice but to send his men back to work.

The ILA won a slim victory in the May 26, 1954 election, despite aggressive IBL campaigning. In August 1954, the results were finally approved and certified by NLRB, and thus the ILA was given representational rights in the Port of New York. The IBL did not go quietly, and forced a third representational election in 1956, in which it was again defeated. By the time an AFL–CIO committee recommended re-admittance for the ILA in August 1959, the IBL was active only in the Great Lakes. In October, the IBL officially dissolved itself and IBL president Larry Long became president of ILA's Great Lakes District.

Gleason was unanimously elected president at the ILA International Convention in 1963. Gleason moved the headquarters to its current location in New Jersey and worked on improving the union's financial affairs.

=== Governmental Efforts to Reform the ILA ===
In 1953 the states of New York and New Jersey entered into an interstate compact, with Congressional approval, that established a Waterfront Commission responsible for regulating the ILA by preventing individuals with a criminal record from holding positions within it.

The federal government has made two attempts to use civil RICO suits to rid the union of organized crime's influence, but fallen short on each occasion. The first case, filed in 1990, was brought against a number of ILA local unions, ILA officers and reputed organized crime figures operating in the New York and New Jersey area. "Although the government attempted to prove the existence of an overarching RICO enterprise, in practical effect the government's case was broken into relatively discrete units, each targeting a different local union and a different location on the Waterfront." The government entered into consent decrees with most of the individual defendants that required them to leave the ILA and/or pay restitution to the local union, and obtained the agreement by the local union defendants to accept monitors or ombudsmen with the power to supervise their affairs. But, even so, in the opinion of some observers, those agreements were ineffective, as the Genovese and Gambino crime families remained influential in those local unions.

The second RICO action was brought against the International Union, rather than against particular ILA locals; it also named several ERISA benefit funds and a number of individual defendants. The suit ran into problems at the outset, however, as the court dismissed the action for failure to state a claim on which relief could be granted because the court found the government's attempt to allege a "waterfront enterprise" made up of different parties acting for separate purposes was incoherent. The government has not pursued this effort to impose a trusteeship over the International.

In 2018, the Waterfront Commission of New York Harbor, which exerted government oversight of the docks in New York and New Jersey, criticized hiring patterns by the ILA. The commission said the ILA "still exerts control over hiring in the port, that waterfront employers have been forced to hire those that the ILA wants hired, and that the prime positions on the waterfront are given to those individuals with connections to the mainly all-white union leadership." The Commission ceased to exist later in 2018, however, when New Jersey withdrew from its compact with New York establishing it.

=== The Containerization Revolution ===
While early forms of containerization had been in use for nearly two centuries, starting with purpose-built wagons designed to be loaded onto barges to transport coal, until the mid-twentieth century nearly all freight handled by longshoremen was loaded and unloaded as breakbulk cargo, typically hoisted with cargo slings or transported on pallets. The "containerization revolution" began in 1955 when former trucking company owner Malcom McLean and engineer Keith Tantlinger developed the modern intermodal container.

This new method of packing and transporting goods had a drastic impact on longshore work, dramatically reducing the amount of labor required to load and unload cargo and largely eliminating many job functions. The ILWU was the first US longshore union to address the impact of containerization through the Mechanization and Modernization Agreement of 1960, which applied to ports on the West Coast of the US.

The ILA followed suit in 1965, when the ILA negotiated what was at the time the longest-lasting ILA contract in history and the first truly forward-looking contract the union signed. As automation and containerization increased, the contract focused on preserving jobs through initiatives such as the Guaranteed Annual Income (GAI) program and the Job Security Program (JSP).

Some employers outside New York who faced the loss of business as a result of the agreement challenged the "Rules on Containers" that were negotiated and agreed to by management and labor as a means of preserving jobs. The National Labor Relations Board originally upheld the challenge, only to be reversed by the United States Supreme Court in two cases in the 1980s that held that the rules were lawful and did not violate federal labor law. However, the Federal Trade Commission later found that the Rules were an impermissible restraint on trade.

The ILA has continued to address the impact of containerization and automation of work on the docks. In September 2024, in their negotiations with the United States Maritime Alliance, the ILA demanded a total ban on automation of cranes, gates and containers at 36 U.S. ports. The ILA threatened to strike that month unless they would receive wage hikes and a ban on automation at U.S. ports. ILA members were offered a nearly 50% wage hike, triple employer contributions to pension plans, and better health care options while retaining current rules on automation, but the ILA rejected the offer and began a strike in October.

Contemporary accounts attribute the decision to strike to ILA International President Harold Daggett, who had been known as a critic of the Biden administration and who said the strike would "cripple" the economy prior to the 2024 presidential election. Daggett criticized the labor agreement that the ILWU, the main longshore union on the West Coast, reached in 2023 with the help of the Biden administration, which boosted salaries by 32%, for not doing enough to stop automation.

The ILA and employers reached agreement in early 2025 on a new six-year collective bargaining agreement that included a 62 percent wage increase over the life of the contract; full protections against automation; accelerated wage increases for new ILA workers; enhanced container royalty funds; increases in contributions to money purchase plans; a strengthening of the International’s health care plan; and other changes. Later in 2025 the ILA participated in a conference in Lisbon that led to the creation of a “Global Maritime Alliance” of maritime unions joining together to fight any expansion of automating waterfront facilities around the world.

== Political Activities ==
The ILA conducted boycotts aimed at trade with the Soviet Union during periods of crisis, such as the Soviet invasion of Afghanistan. The Supreme Court ruled in two companion cases in the 1980s that the union's boycott could not be enjoined under the Norris-LaGuardia Act, but that it was an unlawful secondary boycott that violated the Taft-Hartley Act.

== History of the ILA Outside New York ==
=== The Great Lakes ===
The ILA grew out of the union of Great Lakes longshoremen founded by Daniel Keefe in the nineteenth century. Recent years have seen a significant contraction of the amount of work on the Great Lakes due to containerization and automation and the drop in the amount of foreign cargo moving through the Lakes. As a result the ILA Great Lakes District was incorporated into the ILA Atlantic Coast District in 1992. History of the Great Lakes ILA

Local 1317, whose members work the docks in Cleveland, acquired notoriety because of its connection to Danny Greene, an organized crime figure who held office within the local for a few years in the 1960s before the local was put under trusteeship pursuant to the Labor Management Reporting and Disclosure Act of 1959 because of Greene's extortion of the Local's members. Greene, who was murdered by other organized crime figures in 1977, was the subject of both a book, To Kill The Irishman, and a movie, Kill the Irishman.

=== Eastern Canada ===
The ILA has represented Canadian longshoremen since the turn of the twentieth century. The Canadian Joint Council, founded in 2018, represents all ILA Locals in Canada [Local 269 (Halifax, Nova Scotia); Local 273 (St. John, New Brunswick); Local 479 (Thunder Bay, Ontario); Local 1259 (North Sydney, NS); Local 1341 (Halifax, NS); Local 1654 (Hamilton, ON); Local 1657 (Montreal, Quebec); Local 1738 (Halifax, Nova Scotia); Local 1825 (Halifax, NS); Local 1842 (Toronto, ON); Local 1843 (Halifax, NS); Local 1867 (Thunder Bay, ON); Local 1879 (Hamilton, ON); Local 1953 (St. John's, Newfoundland and Labrador); Local 1976 (Mulgrave, NS); Local 1997 (Oshawa, ON); Local 2020 (Rimouski, QC); Local 2029 (Dalhousie, NB); Local 2033 (Cacouna, QC); Local 2048 (La Malbaie, QC); Local 2054 (Corner Brook, NFLD); and Local 2065 (Sheets Harbour, NS)].

=== Boston ===
Boston longshoremen organized the Boston Longshoreman’s Provident Union in either 1847 or 1881. The ILA became the bargaining representative for Boston longshoremen in 1913, intervening in a failing thirteen-week strike by the BLPU and the Knights of Labor by settling the strike for a three cent per hour wage increase, raising their wages to 33 cents per hour for a ten-hour day.

For the next twenty-two years, wages for Boston longshoremen, and all others in the North Atlantic District, stretching from Portland, Maine to Hampton Roads, Virginia, were set through negotiations between the New York Shipping Association (NYSA) and the ILA locals of New York, to which unions from the "outer ports" were invited to send representatives. Once the NYSA and ILA reached agreement on wages and hours of work the "outer port" unions then bargained over their own port conditions, meal hours, damaged cargo rates, and other local issues.

That pattern began to change in 1931, when Boston longshoremen went out on an eleven-week strike over premium pay when required to work through a meal hour. The strike became especially bitter when Governor Ely allowed Black strikebreakers to be housed on the Commonwealth Pier, which was state property. This move was countermanded by Ely's political rival, Mayor James Michael Curley, who ordered the strikebreakers off the pier as a violation of local sanitation codes.

The strike settled shortly thereafter, but the animosity of the White longshoremen toward Blacks was so deep-seated that, fourteen years later, ILA members refused to work alongside Black soldiers who were training as longshoremen by moving empty boxes on the same docks that the ILA members were working. There were no Black longshoremen working anywhere in the Boston area as of 1954.

The Boston locals continued bargaining with shippers, signing a "port conditions" agreement in 1935, but then did not sign another agreement until 1950, depending instead on the New York negotiations to provide updated terms, which the Boston employers then formally accepted. This lack of a written agreement discouraged shippers from using the Port of Boston. It was only with the expulsion of the ILA from the AFL in 1953, which put the ILA in danger of being raided by other unions, that the International forced the Boston locals to resume entering into formal collective bargaining agreements.

=== Philadelphia ===
The city’s roughly five thousand longshoremen in 1913 were about one-third African-American, a third Irish and Irish-American, and a third Eastern Europeans, especially Lithuanians and Poles. The IWW included members of each ethnic group on its bargaining team in negotiating with employers and integrated work gangs. The ILA replaced the IWW on the docks after the 1922 lockout, coupled with attacks on that union by authorities, broke its strength.

=== Baltimore ===
Baltimore was the sixth largest port in the world around the start of the twentieth century. Unlike the Port of New York or Boston, which were dominated by Irish and Italian immigrants, Baltimore's stevedores and longshoremen were overwhelmingly Polish. In the 1930s about eighty percent of Baltimore's longshoremen were Polish or of Polish descent. The port of Baltimore had an international reputation of fast cargo handling credited to the well-organized gang system that was nearly free of corruption, wildcat strikes and constant work stoppages, unlike its East coast counterparts. The New York Anti-Crime Commission and the Waterfront Commission of New York looked upon the Baltimore system as the ideal one for all ports.

The hiring of longshoremen in Baltimore by the gang system dates back to 1913. The Polish longshoremen began setting up the system by selecting the most skilled men to lead them. This newly formed gang would usually work for the same company, which would give the priority to the gang. During times when there was no work within that company the gang would work elsewhere, or even divide to aid other groups in their work, which would speed up the work and would make it more efficient. In an environment as dangerous as a busy waterfront, the Baltimore's gangs always operated together as a unit, because the experience let them know what each member would do at any given time making the waterfront a much safer place. At the beginning of the Second World War Polish predominance in the Port of Baltimore would significantly diminish as many Poles left to fight the war.

The Department of Justice brought suit in 1969 to require the ILA to merge the two segregated local unions that represented Black and White longshoremen in Baltimore, to create a single hiring hall and a single seniority list for all longshoremen, and to abolish the gang system in favor of a daily shapeup. The District Court ordered the merging the two locals and creation of a single hiring hall and seniority list, but did not order elimination of the gang system; the Court of Appeals affirmed.

=== Charleston ===
Black longshoremen have made up nearly the entire workforce on the docks in Charleston, South Carolina for the last half of the 19th century, both before and after emancipation, and since then. They established their own union, the Longshoremen Protective Union Association (LPUA), that wielded political influence in both the Republican and Democratic parties of postbellum South Carolina. The LPUA ceased to exist around the turn of the 19th century.

In 1936 the ILA chartered Local 1422, a segregated union of Black dockworkers. Led by George German, Local 1422 has been described as "the backbone of Charleston’s Black middle class." At the same time the Local kept a deliberately low profile during the Civil rights movement, focusing instead on economic issues, to avoid providing "an easy target for race-baiting politicians".

Local 1422 was at the center of a long legal battle involving the Charleston Five, five longshoremen facing prosecution in 2000 for their involvement with a picket line conflict with local police. The five were ultimately freed after being held under house arrest for nearly two years while awaiting trial.

=== Miami ===
The ILA chartered Local 1416, a segregated union restricted to Black longshoremen, in 1936. At the time dock workers in Miami-Dade County were being paid thirty cents an hour, one of the lowest wage rates in the country. Judge Henderson, the founder and first president of the local union, negotiated a collective bargaining agreement that raised employees' wages and went on to be elected International Vice-President of the ILA. Local 1416 was, during the 1940s and 1950s, "the first effective political arm of Black people in Dade County."

Local 1922, also based in Miami, was run for years by George Barone, the President of Local 1922, an International Vice-President of the ILA, and a member of the Genovese crime family who had been barred from working in the New York-New Jersey Harbor by the Waterfront Commission. Barone was convicted in 1979 of charges involving extortion, racketeering, obstruction of justice, tax violations and other crimes. Barone was forced to resign his union offices in 2001, according to a wiretapped conversation involving Arthur Coffey, President of Local 1922, because he had disrespected a son of Vincent Gigante, the head of the Genovese crime family. Barone subsequently became a cooperating witness for the FBI and the Waterfront Commission. Barone claimed, among other things, that he had helped engineer Harold Daggett's election as International President of the ILA—a claim that the federal government tried, but failed, to prove in criminal proceedings against Daggett.

=== Tampa ===
The ILA chartered Local 1402 as a segregated Black local in 1935. Longshoremen obtained representation by Local 1402 in an NLRB election in 1936. The vote cost the leaders of the Tampa union their jobs, but in what was one of the first cases before the National Labor Relations Board the following year, the workers were able to force Tampa's shippers to recognize their union and the leaders received back pay for the unlawful retaliation against them. The union won its first labor agreement after striking in 1937.

Local 1402's second President, Perry Harvey Sr., became an important spokesperson for Local 1402's members and the African-American community in Tampa more generally. His son succeeded him as President of Local 1402 and was the first Black member of Tampa's City Council.

=== Mobile, Alabama ===
Like other Southern ports, Mobile, Alabama had segregated locals for White and Black longshoremen; Local 1410, the African-American local, was established in 1936. This form of Jim Crow unionism provided for a rough division of work between Black and White longshoremen. It also gave Black longshoremen the opportunity to run their own affairs and produced local leaders, such as Isom Clemon (October 18, 1919 - April 16, 1994), a prominent civil rights leader in Mobile, who was one of the co-founders of the Alabama Democratic Conference (ADC) established to help African-Americans gain political access and was also instrumental in helping get the first African-American delegates from Alabama seated at a Democratic National Convention. Dr. Martin Luther King Jr. made his only public appearance in Mobile in 1959 at Local 1410's union hall, which served as a cultural and political center for the community.

=== New Orleans ===
The ILA was one of the few AFL unions in the early twentieth century that not only admitted Black workers as members, but elected them as leaders, although typically within segregated local unions. James E. Porter of New Orleans was an exception, as he was elected as an International Vice-President of the ILA during these years, despite demands from White longshoremen from New Orleans that a White unionist be elected instead.

Black and White New Orleans longshoremen, organized in separate ILA locals, had long traditions of sharing work on a 50/50 basis, which meant insisting that foremen hire equal numbers of Black and White members of each work gang to prevent employers from playing each group off against the other. The segregated locals also cooperated in dealing with employers, creating a Dock and Cotton Council in 1901 that brought together unions of black and White screwmen, longshoremen, teamsters, loaders, and other work classifications at the waterfront. Leadership positions on the council were generally divided according to the 50-50 system, with the presidency and financial secretary position held by White workers and the vice-presidency and corresponding secretary position held by black workers; committee positions were similarly assigned.

This era of interracial cooperation ended in 1923, when employers broke the Council's strike and the Council itself by importing large numbers of strikebreakers from rural parishes, then imposing the open shop with the assistance of municipal and state governments and the federal courts. That defeat meant that neither Black nor White locals had the power they once had to demand equal assignments for White and Black workers. The defeat of the strike also indirectly changed the racial makeup of the workforce over the years to come, as Black longshoremen now outnumbered White ones by three to one, making them more concerned with fending off White incursions on one of the few areas where they had an advantage than with strengthening common bonds with their White coworkers.

The ILA chartered two new segregated local unions in New Orleans in 1935: Local 1418 for White dockworkers and Local 1919 for their Black counterparts. These two new locals likewise sometimes competed and sometimes cooperated in distributing work between them.

That same year of 1935 the ILA launched a major strike in New Orleans and other Gulf ports that sought to recover control of dock operations in New Orleans; that strike failed due to the lack of support from the Seamen's Union and opposition from the International Union.

The segregated New Orleans locals finally merged in 1980, due to both the legal indefensibility of segregating locals by race and the loss of work due to the relocation of work to other ports due to New Orleans' failure to modernize to accept containerization. The port has continued to lose work to other, more modern ports in Gulfport and other nearby communities in the years since then.

=== Houston ===
As in other Southern ports, African-American dockworkers have made up a large part of the Houston longshore workforce for more than a century. The ILA created segregated locals for Blacks and Whites in Houston, as they did in other Southern ports. Those locals developed the custom of dividing available work on a fifty-fifty basis, so that employers could not set one group against the other as a means of driving down wage rates; they also included equal numbers of White and Black Union representatives on the bargaining committees that negotiated the areawide agreements covering their workplaces. Rotating work among gangs from the segregated locals also helped toward "decasualization," a reduction in the number of casual laborers.

The ILA struggled for survival in Texas in the early days of the Great Depression, as employers tried to replace it with company unions. ILA members, taking inspiration from the 1934 West Coast strike, launched a strike at major Gulf ports, including Corpus Christi, Galveston, Houston, Port Arthur, Beaumont, Lake Charles, New Orleans, Mobile, and Pensacola.

The 1935 Gulf Coast strike was notably violent, particularly in Houston, where the Houston Police Department deputized 56 strikebreakers, including former officers, and brought in additional recruits by the busload. They also hired former Texas Ranger Frank Hamer, the killer of Bonnie Parker and Clyde Barrow, to head a special force to protect the shipping companies' property. The strike failed to achieve its immediate goals. However it served to demonstrate that the ILA was prepared to take on both the employers and the company unions. With the passage of the NLRA that year the ILA was able to drive those company unions off the docks.

Following the passage of the Civil Rights Act of 1964, the Equal Employment Opportunity Commission and the federal Department of Justice challenged the continued existence of segregated ILA locals. A number of African-American locals opposed the suit, arguing that their members would lose both job opportunities and control over their organizations if forced to merge with White locals. The District Court granted most of the relief sought by the government, including the abolition of the 50/50 system, but ruled that merger of the locals was a more complex problem that he was not prepared to decide at that juncture. The Fifth Circuit Court of Appeals reversed the trial court and ordered the locals merged.

== Presidents ==
1892: Daniel Keefe
1909: Thomas V. O'Connor
1921: Anthony Chlopek
1927: Joseph P. Ryan
1953: William Bradley
1963: Teddy Gleason
1987: John Bowers
2007: Richard Hughes
2011: Harold J. Daggett

== See also ==
- Anthony Anastasio
- Anthony "Sonny" Ciccone
- Danny Greene
- Industrial Workers of the World (Wobblies)
- Paul Kelly (early twentieth-century gangster active in 1919 strike)
- Longshoremen v. Allied Int'l, Inc. (1982 US Supreme Court case which held the ILA's boycott of handling Soviet cargo was an unfair labor practice)
- New Orleans dock workers and unionization (account of biracial unionism in New Orleans in the early twentieth century)
- New York City tugboat strike of 1946
- On the Waterfront (film shot in Hoboken, New Jersey in the early 1950s)
- Pete Panto (union dissident murdered for his opposition to the Ryan Administration)
- Anthony Scotto (politically connected captain in the Gambino crime family for more than a decade who was also a key officer in the ILA)
