= Charleston Five =

The Charleston Five are five men - Kenneth Jefferson, Rick Simmons, Peter Washington, Elijah Ford, and Jason Edgerton - who were brought up on felony charges of conspiracy to incite a riot on January 19, 2000, in Charleston, South Carolina.

The Five were longshoremen and union members of Local 1422 of the International Longshoremen's Association. They were peacefully protesting a Danish freight company's use of non-union workers on the Charleston docks when a fight broke out between picketing workers and a police force. The Charleston Five were arrested along with four others and were held on felony charges which could have carried a prison sentence of up to 10 years.

== The Protest ==
On 19 January a ship from Danish Nordana's shipping Lines docked in the Charleston port and employed 19 non-unionized workers to unload the cargo. This company that had used the services of the Charleston Union Labors for 23 years had decided to end this association in 1999. It was the region of the union International Longshoremen's Association (ILA) local 1422 and they decided to picket against it. With this kind of preparation and continuous provocation by the police, including racist taunts, the picketing longshoremen got in touch with ILA 1422A mechanics union and Locals 1771. By nightfall there were almost 130 longshoremen picketing, though some media suggested the number could have been up to 300. Then as the leadership went ahead to figure out what the intention was, the protesters threw rocks, bottles, and railroad ties at the police. The police started baton charge, gas shell firing and even charged an armored vehicle at the longshoremen.

== Trial ==
The Five's arrests set off a firestorm of political implications and finger pointing and allegedly some South Carolina officials were using the arrests as political fulcrums to further their careers. In October 2001, the case's prosecutor, South Carolina Attorney General Charlie Condon publicly compared the Charleston Five to the terrorists who had destroyed the twin towers and world trade center the month before. The backlash from this comment was such that Condon soon removed himself as prosecutor and appointed 1st Circuit Solicitor, Walter Bailey as his replacement.

With mounting worldwide protest and international solidarity for the Charleston 5, they were finally freed of all charges in November 2001, after one year of trial, throughout which they were kept under house arrest.
