= Anthony Scotto =

American mobster (1934–2021)

- Scotto on the Brooklyn waterfront in 1965
- Born: Anthony M. Scotto; May 10, 1934; New York City, U.S.
- Died: August 21, 2021 (aged 87); New York City, U.S.
- Occupations: Mobster and labor union racketeer
- Spouse: Marion Anastasio (m. 1957)
- Children: 4; including Rosanna
- Relatives: Anthony Anastasio (father-in-law)
- Convictions: Bribery and racketeering (1979)
- Penalty: Five years' imprisonment and fined $75,000 (1980)

Anthony M. Scotto (Italian: [ˈskɔtto]; May 10, 1934 – August 21, 2021) was an American New York mobster and labor union racketeer in the Gambino crime family who ruled the Brooklyn waterfront.

== Early life ==
Scotto grew up in the Red Hook Carroll Gardens section of Brooklyn. His father worked for the New York City Department of Sanitation and was a union organizer. Scotto attended St. Francis Preparatory School in Brooklyn. At age 16, Scotto started working as a longshoreman on the Brooklyn waterfront. Scotto studied pre-law and political science at Brooklyn College for two years, then dropped out.

In 1957, Scotto married Marion Anastasio, whose father was Capo Anthony Anastasio of what was the Anastasia crime family. Marion's uncle was boss Albert Anastasia. Scotto and Marion had four children: broadcast journalist Rosanna Scotto, Elaina Scotto, Anthony Scotto Jr. and John Scotto. The family owns and operates the restaurant Fresco by Scotto on East 52nd Street in Manhattan.

As an officer of the International Longshoremen's Association (ILA) Local 1814 in Red Hook, Anastasio used his position to control the Brooklyn waterfront. Scotto eventually joined Anastasio at the union local and became an ILA officer. In 1957, Anastasia was murdered and underboss Carlo Gambino took over what became the Gambino crime family. Enjoying an excellent relationship with Gambino, Scotto was soon inducted into the family. Scotto rose to the job of clerk in the local and then to recording secretary. In 1959, Scotto became the organization director at Local 1814.

In 1963, Anastasio died and Scotto succeeded him as head of ILA Local 1814. Called a "new breed labor leader" by the press, Scotto quickly rose into high level business and political circles. Scotto promised a new era of labor harmony on the waterfront

Who knows what you can achieve when there are reasonable men on both sides of the table?

Scotto eventually became the ILA general organizer, one of the three highest positions in the 100,000 member labor union.

In 1969, government witness Joseph Valachi identified Scotto in U.S. Senate hearings as a member of the Gambino family. Scotto dismissed Valachi's claims, saying it was part of a U.S. Justice Department vendetta against him.

== Political connections ==
Scotto became one of the most powerful mafiosos in New York due to his powerful political connections. Scotto even became friends with the mob's most feared enemy, U.S. Attorney General Robert F. Kennedy. In 1972, Scotto used his influence to get his lawyer, Bertram Perkel, appointed as a special counselor to Police Commissioner Patrick V. Murphy. Also in 1972, Scotto was named as a delegate to the Democratic National Convention, but stepped down in protest over the actions of the Convention Credentials Committee. Scotto at one point claimed to have raised millions of dollars for Democratic candidate Hugh Carey's 1974 gubernatorial campaign in New York. Scotto had numerous dealings with Carey over political appointments and labor issues. In 1976, both Scotto and his wife Marion were selected as delegates to the Democratic National Convention.

When Democrat Mario Cuomo ran for mayor of New York in 1977, Scotto donated $50,000 to his campaign. President Jimmy Carter had named Scotto as a possible candidate for the position of U.S. Secretary of Labor. At the same time, Gambino planned to make Scotto president of the entire ILA in the United States; however, this ambition was derailed by criminal charges.

== Racketeering conviction ==
On January 17, 1979, Scotto was indicted on 33 federal bribery and racketeering charges. Scotto was accused of accepting $300,000 over five years from two dockside businessmen who employed his union workers. Scotto also accepted a free swimming pool built by one businessman at Scotto's vacation home. Scotto was also accused of evading federal income tax. On November 16, 1979, Scotto was convicted on all charges. Before sentencing, U.S. District Judge Charles E. Stewart Jr. remarked that he was "extremely impressed" by letters from former New York City Mayors Robert F. Wagner Jr. and John Lindsay, businessmen, and labor leaders all requesting leniency for Scotto. On January 22, 1980, Stewart bypassed the maximum sentence of 20 years imprisonment and instead gave Scotto five years in prison with a $75,000 fine.

He served time at Federal Correctional Institution, Danbury, a prison in Minnesota and Federal Correctional Institution, Otisville. In October 1984, after serving 39 months, Scotto was released from prison. Scotto has been identified as a made man, or full member, of the Gambino family by government witness Salvatore Gravano. Gambino's successor, family boss Paul Castellano, was intercepted by a federal wiretap explaining to Thomas Gambino and Thomas Bilotti about Scotto that,

We respected him ... It was our union ... We were making him advance in our union ... Go up, up, up ... the ladder. And ... what's gonna happen, we're gonna have a president.

After Castellano's assassination in 1985, new family boss John Gotti replaced Scotto in the labor rackets with another Red Hook mobster, Anthony Ciccone.

== Later years and death ==
During his 20-year reign on the New York waterfront (and quite possibly the most powerful labor racketeer in the entire country), Scotto was also able to penetrate District Council 37, America's biggest, richest, and most indicted municipal union. Former union leader Victor Gotbaum reached out to Scotto to help him in his battle against the Teamsters Union for jurisdiction over New York City's hospital workers. Scotto made his attorney, Bertram Perkel, DC 37's outside counsel (Scotto also appointed Perkel to the New York Port Commission). Eventually, DC 37 would come under the control of the Colombo crime family.

Scotto lectured about labor relations at Harvard University and the New School for Social Research in Manhattan. Scotto also served as a trustee for the Brooklyn Academy of Music.

Scotto died on August 21, 2021, at the age of 87.
