= Teddy Gleason =

President of the International Longshoremen's Association from 1963 to 1987

Thomas William Gleason
- Born: November 8, 1900; New York City
- Died: December 24, 1992 (aged 92); New York City
- Occupation: Trade union leader
- Predecessor: William Bradley
- Successor: John Bowers

Thomas William "Teddy" Gleason (November 8, 1900 – December 24, 1992) was president of the International Longshoremen's Association from 1963 to 1987.

Gleason was born in New York City, the oldest of 13 children. Coming from a family of longshoremen, he left school after the seventh grade and started working in the docks. When wages were cut in 1931 in the wake of the Great Depression, Gleason and several co-workers were blacklisted for stopping work. This eventually led to the eviction of Gleason, his wife and their two children from their home when they could not pay the rent. When he was blacklisted, he pushed a hand truck in a sugar factory during the day and he sold hot dogs on Coney Island at night.

When the New Deal allowed him to resume work in the docks, he became an ILA member and rose to the rank of ILA organizer in 1947, as a protegee of ILA president Joseph P. Ryan. Gleason supported William Bradley when he replaced Ryan in 1953; Gleason, in turn, replaced Bradley in 1963 as president.

In 1963, during the Kennedy administration, he opposed Kennedy's proposal to sell surplus wheat to the Soviet Union, but relented when the government agreed that half of the grain ships would be American ships. When the Johnson Administration went back on this promise, Gleason led an eight-day-long dockworkers' boycott of the Soviet-bound wheat.

In 1971, when the Nixon Administration informally made grain sales to the Soviet Union part of striking a deal for a Strategic Arms Limitation Treaty, the union refused to load Soviet ships. When Henry Kissinger tried to persuade Gleason on the issue, Gleason told Kissinger to "go fuck yourself." The union relented when the administration said it would find funding for construction of more merchants ships and support legislation important to the union. In exchange, Gleason was the first member of the AFL-CIO executive committee to endorse Nixon for re-election.

During the Vietnam War, Gleason made four trips to Saigon to relieve congestion in the ports there. He also performed similar duties at Mombasa in Kenya.

Gleason handed over the presidency to his vice president John Bowers in 1987.

Gleason died in the Cabrini Medical Center in Manhattan on Christmas Eve of 1992 at the age of 92.

Trade union offices
Preceded by Kenneth J. Brown; C. L. Dennis	AFL-CIO delegate to the Trades Union Congress; 1970; With: I. W. Abel	Succeeded by John Griner; Paul Jennings
