= Mechanization and Modernization Agreement 1960 =

The Mechanization and Modernization (M&M) Agreement of 1960 was an agreement reached by the International Longshore and Warehouse Union (ILWU) and the Pacific Maritime Association. This agreement applied to workers on the Pacific Coast of the United States, the West Coast of Canada, and Hawaii. The original agreement was for a five-year term and was to remain in effect until July 1, 1966.

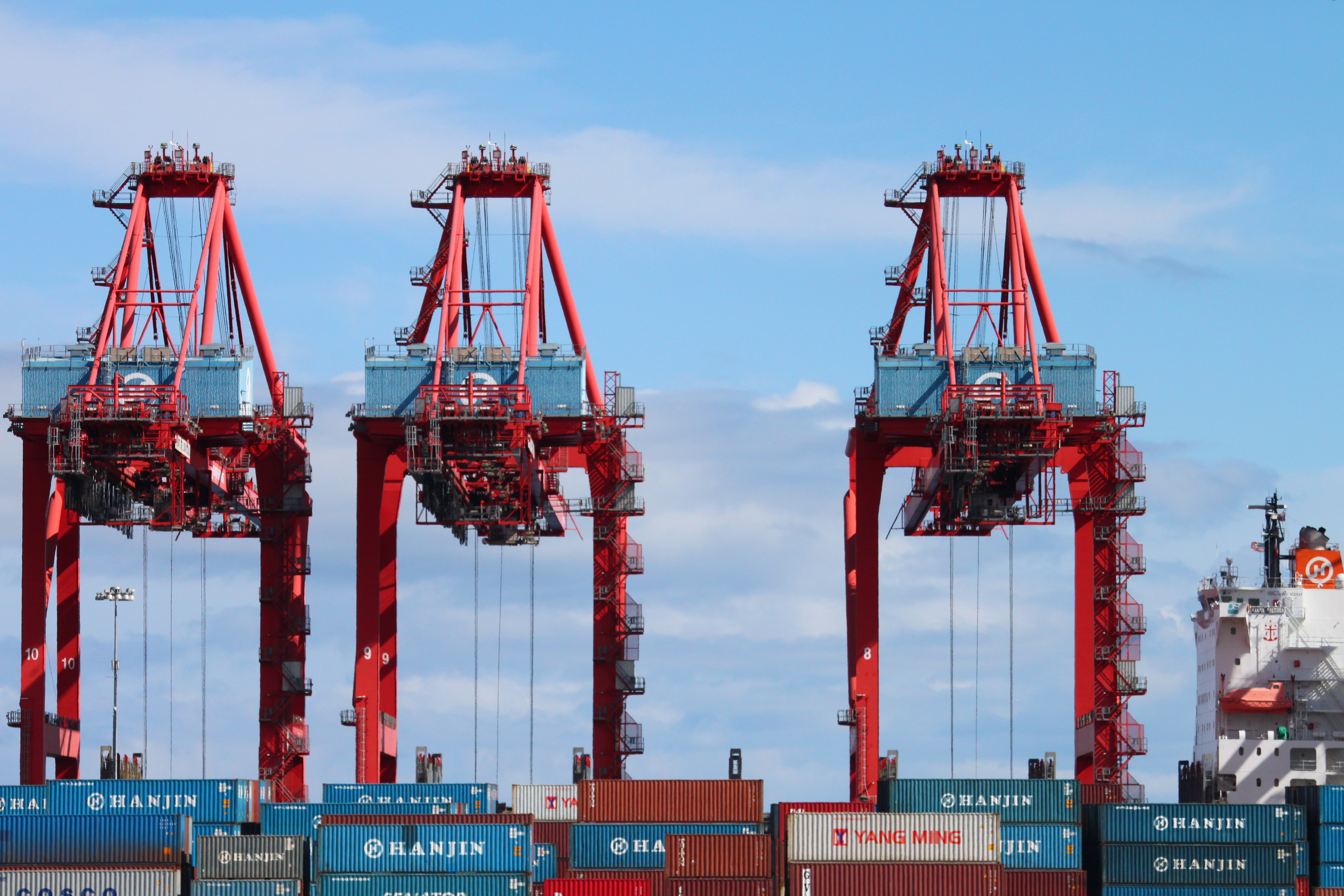
The Hanjin terminal at The Port of Long Beach.

== Origins ==
Prior to the 1940s, most cargo was moved by hand and required a large number of workers. Even with the use of rope slings, dollies, forklifts, and cranes to take large loads off of ships experienced longshoremen were still needed to maximize the space in each container.

The methods of cargo movement differed greatly between each port on the Pacific Coast. Depending on the size of the cargo and what was being shipped, many ports required extensive manual labor of dock workers while others required the use of specialized mechanical cranes to hoist large truck containers off ships.

After World War II, the demand for a more efficient way of loading and unloading cargo brought new technology to ports that would require less workers to move shipments. Containerization, which took that technology further than previous efforts, was first introduced to U.S. ports in the late 1950s.

== Provisions ==
Harry Bridges, then leader of the ILWU, negotiated the Mechanization and Modernization Agreement, which was signed on October 18, 1960. It distinguished between three classes of longshoremen workers. Depending on the level of worker, each worker was guaranteed a certain set of benefits.

=== Worker classes ===
- "A" men: These men were fully registered longshoremen and had ILWU membership. They enjoyed preference for dispatch in ports and could claim full benefits as mentioned in the M&M Agreement.
- "B" men: These men were partially registered to the ILWU. Although they couldn't claim benefits as mentioned in the M&M Agreement, they could claim benefits provided for by the Union's collective bargaining agreement with the PMA, such as welfare and vacations benefits. If the "A" list was exhausted, "B" men would be the next group to be dispatched for work.
- Casual: They would only work peak days when the "A" and "B" lists were exhausted. These men could not claim any benefits as mentioned in either the ILWU-PMA contracts or in the M&M Agreement.

=== Agreements and benefits ===
The M&M Agreement guaranteed employment security for the basic workforce of registered union members ("A" men). If there were to be a decline in employment due to modernization, there would be a reduction in the number of "B" men and casual workers in order to prevent the loss of employment for the basic workforce.

The ILWU asked that the Agreement also shorten weekly work shifts from 40 hours to 35 hours per week in order to accommodate the basic workforce and maintain equal wages among workers. Employers would be able to introduce new technology and devices that would improve the ports' productivity and efficiency, and reduce the size of the workforce.

== Criticisms ==
Although the M&M Agreement provided employment security for ILWU members, it did not prevent the Longshoremen's Strike of 1971. The M&M Agreement failed to fully adapt to the introduction of technology and containerization at ports. The introduction of technology greatly reduced the need for labor by up to 90% and employers preferred to employ permanent workers ("A" men) rather than others, thus creating an imbalance between workers and wages. Also dock jobs were being placed outside of port areas and jobs were now being disputed between different unions. Whereas employers of longshoremen were continuing making a profit from the reduction of labor.

In July 1971, 12,000 longshoremen walked out of West Coast ports; however, the strike failed to inflict significant economic harm on employers. Without support from Harry Bridges, the ILWU leader, a Los Angeles court ordered all workers back to work. Although Bridges attempted to reconcile with workers by creating a new contract, the contract failed to live up to expectations and "B" men and casual workers were unemployed.

== Significance and legacy ==
Since the Mechanization and Modernization Agreement, the ILWU had attempted to bring other unorganized, nonunion waterfront occupations into the union as a means to counteract new technology at ports. The ILWU has since expanded its jurisdiction as to maintain high employment for its members. Although organization of these occupations was met with employer resistance, the ILWU managed to absorb new jurisdiction. The Mechanization and Modernization Agreement of 1960, provided job security to members, but did not extend its benefits to those outside of the ILWU.
