= Waterfront Commission of New York Harbor =

U.S. bi-state regulatory agency

- Established: August 12, 1953
- Founder: U.S. government
- Dissolved: July 2023
- Type: Interstate compact
- Location(s): Port of New York and New Jersey
- Region served: New York and New Jersey
- Services: Law enforcement

The Waterfront Commission of New York Harbor (WCNYH) was a regulatory agency in the Port of New York and New Jersey in the northeast of the United States. The bi-state agency was founded in 1953 by a Congressionally authorized compact between New York and New Jersey "for the purpose of eliminating various evils on the waterfront in the Port of New York Harbor." Under statutory mandate, the mission of the commission was to investigate, deter, combat, and remedy criminal activity and influence in the port district and also ensure fair hiring and employment practices.

In 2018, New Jersey attempted to withdraw from the pact. In 2023, the United States Supreme Court ruled that it could do so, and the commission was dissolved on July 17, 2023. It was succeeded by the New Jersey State Police at NJ ports and the newly established New York Waterfront Commission at NYC ports.

== History ==
The commission was set up in August 1953 (a year before the movie On the Waterfront) to combat labor racketeering. The commission was initially created to combat unfair hiring practices on the waterfront in response to the growing number of crimes being committed there.

The Division of Licensing and Employment Information Centers was responsible for screening, registering, and licensing individuals who are interested in working at the dock. The commission was authorized to deny or revoke the registrations or licenses of those involved in criminal activity.

=== Investigations ===
The Waterfront Commission participated in the investigation of criminal activities by the leaders and members of the Gambino crime family and union leaders. Charges of racketeering conspiracy, extortion, theft of union benefits, mail fraud, false statements, loansharking, embezzlement of union funds, money laundering, and illegal gambling, dating back over three decades, were brought forth by the United States District Court for the Eastern District of New York in February 2008 against leaders of the Gambino crime family, their associates, and union officials.

== Law enforcement division ==
The WCNYH law enforcement division (a.k.a. WCPD), were licensed and armed New York State Peace Officers as defined by New York State Criminal Procedure Law § 2.10 (34). The Waterfront Commission of New York Harbor police division cooperated with other law enforcement authorities in the pursuit to investigate crimes at the New York City ports located at Lower Manhattan, Red Hook, Brooklyn, and the Holland Tunnel Terminal in Staten Island.

WCPD used marked police patrol cars (such as Ford Explorer), command center vehicles and boats for water work.

WCPD Officers uniforms were similar to other law enforcement in New York City. Identification included the WCPD patch on both sides of the upper garments and a WCPD shield (badge) on the left breast.

== New York State Inspector General report ==
On August 11, 2009, the New York State Inspector General Joseph Fisch issued a report of his two-year investigation of the Waterfront Commission. The report detailed extensive illegal, corrupt, and unethical conduct by Waterfront Commission staff. Following release of the report, the large majority of the commission's executive staff were fired, including the New Jersey Commissioner Michael J. Madonna (the New York Commissioner's seat was vacant at the time of the report's release, although the report faulted the actions of the former New York Commissioner, Michael C. Axelrod).

The report's existence was due, in part, to two whistleblowers, Kevin McGown and Brian Smith, who both resigned and have since filed a discrimination complaint against the agency.

== New Jersey withdrawal from pact ==
In October 2014, the New Jersey Senate passed measure S-2277 which would direct the governor of New Jersey to withdraw from the bi-state compact and transfer the commission's oversight responsibilities in New Jersey to the state police. In May 2015, Governor Chris Christie conditionally vetoed S-2277 (and the corresponding bill A-3506 passed by the New Jersey General Assembly), citing his concerns that the state lacked the authority to withdraw from the compact and arguing that the solution should be to modify the operations of the commission to minimize interference with waterfront operations.

Among his final actions in January 2018 before leaving office, Christie signed legislation allowing the state to withdraw from the pact.

=== New York v. New Jersey and Dissolution ===
The Supreme Court paused New Jersey's withdrawal from the compact creating the commission until it has addressed the merits of an injunction filed by the State of New York. In April 2023, the Court ruled unanimously in favor of New Jersey, stating that unilateral withdrawal was permissible as the interstate compact creating the commission did not address withdrawals from it. Because there is no explicit form of withdrawal in the compact, the Court found that default contract law from the time of the compact's creation applied, which allows termination of a contract by either party.

After the ruling, the interstate agency was disbanded after New Jersey Gov. Phil Murphy argued that the agency had outlived its usefulness and that the New Jersey State Police would take over law enforcement operations at New Jersey ports.

== People ==
- Myles Joseph Ambrose (1926–2014)
- Stephen Joseph Bercik (1921–2003)
- Joseph Blunt (1792–1860)
- Reverend Fr. John M. Corridan (1911–1984)
- Harold Daggett
- Ralph C. DeRose (1928–2011)
- Henry Stanley Dogin
- Ronald Goldstock
- Percy Whitman Knapp (1909–2004)
- Michael J. Madonna
- Percy A. Miller, Jr. (1899–1984)
- Joseph Meyer Proskauer (1877–1971)
- Nicholas Scoppetta (1932–2016)
- James Harold Wallwork (1930–2024)
- Lawrence Edward Walsh (1912–2014)
