= Ronald Goldstock =

American attorney

Ronald Goldstock is an American attorney known for his work in organized crime law enforcement. He has served as the Director of the New York State Organized Crime Task Force, New York State Commissioner of the Waterfront Commission of New York Harbor, advisor to Secretaries of State for Northern Ireland, as a member of the board of the Javits Center, and as the director of the Cornell University Institute on Organized Crime. He has taught at Cornell, NYU, and Columbia law schools.

== Early career ==
Goldstock began his career at the New York County District Attorney's office under Frank Hogan. He was director of the Cornell University Institute on Organized Crime from 1975 to 1979.

== New York State Organized Crime Task Force ==
Goldstock was appointed Director of the New York State Organized Crime Task Force (OCTF) in 1981, and served in that role until 1994. He is credited with transforming the agency from a “moribund task force” that had not achieved any significant convictions in its decade of existence into one that produced 400 convictions by the time of his resignation. Goldstock’s work as director included producing a study on Cosa Nostra’s involvement in the New York City construction industry and overseeing the OCTF’s involvement in the Mafia Commission Trial, in which the task force gathered evidence from a recording device planted inside the Jaguar of Salvatore Avellino. Goldstock has asserted that he proposed using RICO to prosecute the commission, which then-U.S. Attorney Rudy Giuliani publicly took credit for as his own idea.

== Waterfront Commission ==
Goldstock was named New York State Commissioner of the Waterfront Commission of New York Harbor following widespread corruption in the commission. He left in 2018 after instituting reforms across the commission.

== Publications ==
- Goldstock, Ronald; Marcus, Martin; Thacher, Thomas D. II; Jacobs, James B. (1990). Corruption and Racketeering In The New York City Construction Industry: The Final Report of the New York State Organized Task Force. NYU Press. ISBN 978-0814730348.
