= Anthony Anastasio =

Italian-American mobster

- Anastasio in 1951
- Born: Antonio Anastasio; February 24, 1906; Tropea, Calabria, Kingdom of Italy
- Died: March 1, 1963 (aged 57); New York City, New York, U.S.
- Resting place: Holy Cross Cemetery, Brooklyn, New York, U.S.
- Other name: Tough Tony Anastasio
- Citizenship: American
- Occupation: Mobster
- Organization: International Longshoremen's Association
- Spouse: Rose Lacqua
- Children: 2
- Relatives: Albert Anastasia (brother); Anthony Scotto (son-in-law); Rosanna Scotto (granddaughter)
- Allegiance: Gambino crime family

Anthony Anastasio (/ˌænəˈsteɪsioʊ/; born Antonio Anastasio, Italian: [anˈtɔːnjo anaˈstaːzjo]; February 24, 1906 – March 1, 1963) was an Italian-American mobster and labor racketeer for the Gambino crime family who controlled the Brooklyn dockyards for over thirty years. He controlled Brooklyn Local 1814, and became a vice president of the International Longshoremen's Association (ILA). Anastasio died on March 1, 1963.

== Early life ==
Anastasio was born on February 24, 1906, in Tropea, Calabria, Italy to Bartolomeo Anastasio and Marianna Polistena. Anastasio had seven brothers: Raffaele; Frank; Albert; Joseph; Gerardo; Luigi, who moved to Australia; and Salvatore Anastasio; and a sister, Maria.

In 1919, Anastasio, with his brothers Joseph, Albert, and Gerardo, arrived in New York City, working on a freighter. Deserting the ship, the brothers illegally entered the United States. The boys soon started working as longshoremen on the Brooklyn waterfront. Unlike Albert, Tony kept the original spelling of his last name.

Anastasio married Rose Lacqua and the couple had two daughters, Louise and Marion. In 1957, Marion eventually married Gambino crime family mobster Anthony Scotto, and Louise married Colombo crime family mob associate Joseph Cataldo, brother of Dominick Cataldo.

== Height of power ==
In 1932, Anastasio gained control of Brooklyn Local 1814 of the International Longshoremen's Association and eventually rose to become a vice president of the national ILA. In 1937, Anastasio gained control of six ILA local chapters on the Brooklyn waterfront, sealing his control of the facility. Over the years, Anastasio earned millions for the New York Five Families through kickbacks from dues, stolen merchandise, and payoffs from rival shipping companies.

Anastasio always wore trademark, custom made wide-lapeled double breasted suits with white tie and white carnation which made up his expensive wardrobe, flashy cars, and Broadway showgirl companions which were all paid for by the ILA. When Charles "Lucky" Luciano was incarcerated in Dannemora, it made the Anastasio brothers nervous.

With his brother Albert's position in Murder, Inc., Anastasio ruled the Brooklyn waterfront with an iron hand. During this time, while helping establish Anastasia as a major force on the New York waterfront, Anastasio's power was at its height. It is said he would severely damage foreign shipping and sabotage ships as a means of intimidation (presumably on orders from Anastasio). He made no effort to hide that he was a connected mobster; he only had to say "my brother Albert" to get his point across.

== Normandie fire ==
After Luciano was imprisoned for pandering, Anastasio allegedly organized the arson sabotage of the French luxury liner SS Normandie. Early in 1942, a few months after the U.S. entered World War II, the brothers hit upon a clever scheme. The U.S. Navy at the time was concerned about the dangers of possible acts of sabotage against warships berthed at Brooklyn and Manhattan docks. The brothers made a deal with the Navy to release Luciano, and in return, the mob would guarantee the safety of the docks as far as the Navy's interests were concerned. To get the Navy concerned, they created a maritime disaster: Anastasio had been aware that over the last few months agents of naval intelligence had been scouting the Brooklyn and Manhattan waterfront looking for Italians and Germans who might be involved in a plot to sabotage Navy shipping. A French luxury liner, the SS Normandie, was being hastily converted into a troop transport and was docked at a Hudson River pier. Anthony and his brother Albert claimed they decided to sabotage the Normandie. The fire that broke out the afternoon of February 9, 1942, became one of the most spectacular in New York City's history. For hours, the Normandie burned, until, listing heavily to port from all the water she had taken on, the ship finally capsized along the pier. The destruction of the Normandie prompted the Navy to approach the mob. The Navy won a guarantee that there would be no sabotaging of shipping in New York Harbor. As a reward for his "patriotic" support, Charles Luciano was transferred from the maximum-security prison at Dannemora to Great Meadow prison, a minimum-security facility.

A federal investigation in the wake of the sinking, in conflict with the later claims of the mobsters, concluded that sabotage was not a factor.

== Later years ==
After Albert Anastasia's murder on October 25, 1957, Anthony Anastasio's influence began to fade. However, new boss Carlo Gambino did allow Anastasio to retain control of the Brooklyn docks until his death. In 1962, Anastasio started suspecting that Vito Genovese (the main suspect in his brother's murder) meant to kill him and decided to meet with FBI agents. While discussing Gambino, Peter DeFeo, and Thomas Eboli with the agents, Anastasio reflected on his deceased brother: "I ate from the same table as Albert and came from the same womb but I know he killed many men and he deserved to die".

On March 1, 1963, Anastasio died of a heart attack at Long Island College Hospital in Brooklyn. He is buried in Holy Cross Cemetery, New York City. On the day of the funeral, the Brooklyn docks halted all operations.

Anastasio's grandson, John Scotto, the son of successor New York waterfront racketeer Anthony Scotto, later became an informant for the Los Angeles Police Department between 1993 and 1996. Anastasio's granddaughter, Rosanna Scotto, is a longtime New York City anchorwoman.

== Depictions in Media ==
The character of waterfront boss Johnny Friendly in the movie On the Waterfront was based on Anastasio. Actor Lee J. Cobb received an Oscar nomination in the part.
