= 2012 Ports of Los Angeles and Long Beach strike =

American labor action

2012 Port of Los Angeles / Long Beach lockout
- Date: November 27 – December 4, 2012 (1 week)
- Location: Los Angeles and Long Beach, California, United States
- Caused by: Dispute over labor contract negotiations
- Goals: Greater job security for union members against outsourcing
- Methods: Strike action; Picketing
- Result: Employers and union agree to new labor contract

Parties
International Longshore and Warehouse Union	Port of Los Angeles; Port of Long Beach

In 2012, members of the International Longshore and Warehouse Union were locked out by the employers at the ports of Los Angeles and Long Beach in the U.S. state of California. This was due to issues over labor contract negotiations between port employers and the ILWU's Local 63 Office and Clerical Unit (OCU), which represents about 800 clerical workers at the ports. In 2010, the existing labor contract with the OCU expired, and the union and employers disagreed on the terms of a new contract. The main issue regarded job security, with the union accusing the employers of excessive outsourcing and the employers countering that the union was featherbedding. Negotiations would continue for over 2 years.

On November 27, about 70 OCU members went on strike, with the number of strikers expanding over the following days. About 10,000 longshoremen at the ports, also ILWU members, honored the strike action and refused to cross the picket lines, shutting down over half of the terminals at the ports. Some estimates claim that the strike was causing approximately $1 billion per day in losses, though this figure has been debated. The strike ended on December 4, with both sides agreeing to a tentative labor contract. While this contract was ultimately rejected by the union in February 2013, the union accepted a different contract later that same month.

== Background ==
The Port of Los Angeles and Port of Long Beach, both located in the Greater Los Angeles area, together constitute the largest port complex in the United States, handling approximately one third of the container shipping in the country and 40% of the country's total imports. In the early 2010s, about 800 clerical workers at these facilities were members of the International Longshore and Warehouse Union (ILWU) Local 63 Office and Clerical Unit (OCU). Additionally, approximately 10,000 longshoremen at the ports were also represented by the ILWU. On June 30, 2010, the labor contract between the OCU and employers at the harbor expired, with the two entities negotiating a new contract. However, the two sides disagreed over the contents of the contract, with the union arguing for greater job security, alleging that the employers were trying to outsource the clerical jobs, which was denied by the employers. OCU president John Fageaux alleged specifically that 51 permanent positions at the port had been eliminated over the previous 5 years, with the companies planning to eliminate an additional 76 positions. The port employers countered that the union was engaging in featherbedding. Negotiations would continue for the next two years without results.

== Course of the strike ==
On November 27, 2012, about 70 clerical workers at the Port of Los Angeles, all OCU members, went on strike. The union members worked for APM Terminals, a company that operates Pier 400 at the port. Longshoremen at the pier, also members of the ILWU, honored the strike action and as a result, the port was shut down. Later that day, an arbitrator stated that the longshoremen should not honor the strike, but the longshoremen continued to do so, appealing the arbitrator's ruling to a senior arbitrator. Picketing also commenced at the port. The following day, the strike expanded, shutting down 6 of the 7 terminals at the Port of Los Angeles and 3 of the 6 terminals at the Port of Long Beach. Following this, Los Angeles Mayor Antonio Villaraigosa sent a letter to both the union and representatives for the employers, urging them to resume negotiations. Speaking to the Associated Press that same day, a spokesperson for the Port of Los Angeles stated that the strike was "not crippling the port by any means". However, a report by KPCC on November 29 stated that there were 18 cargo ships in the area that were docked and not being serviced. That same day, the Los Angeles Business Journal stated that U.S. Representatives Judy Chu, Janice Hahn, and Grace Napolitano (all members of the Democratic Party) had voiced their support for the striking workers, while Bloomberg News stated that the National Retail Federation was asking U.S. President Barack Obama to intervene in the labor dispute and also claimed that, if the strike continued, ships originally intended for the ports may instead divert to other ports along the West Coast, significantly increasing shipping costs. By that time, three ships had already diverted, with two traveling to the Port of Oakland in California and one traveling to the Port of Ensenada in Mexico. On the night of November 29, the two sides returned to contract negotiations.

On December 2, following four consecutive days of negotiations, Villaraigosa sent a letter to the employers and union urging them to seek out mediation to resolve the dispute. Around this same time, estimates put the economic impact of the strike at almost $1 billion per day, a figure disputed by international economist Jock O'Connell. The following day, the mayor held a meeting between the two sides to discuss an end to the dispute, and on December 4, the Associated Press reported that White House Press Secretary Jay Carney said that the president was watching the situation closely. On December 4, Villaraigosa announced that both sides had agreed to Federal mediation, with a union representative stating that the strike would still continue. By this point in the strike, 17 ships originally bounded for the twin ports had been diverted to other ports. Later that night, around 10:30 p.m., Villaraigosa announced that both sides had agreed to end the strike, with workers returning to work the following day. The agreement included a proposed labor contract that would require subsequent ratification by the union, with both sides optimistic that the contract would be approved. Details of the contract were not made public. The deal, which was set to last until 2016, was reached shortly before Federal mediators arrived. At 8 days, this strike was the longest one at the ports since a 10-day long labor dispute in 2002.

In February 2013, however, the tentative contract was rejected by the union, raising concerns over possible continuing strike action. However, by February 20, the union voted to approve a new contract between the OCU and employers.
