= Pacific Maritime Association =

American non-profit organization

- Abbreviation: PMA
- Legal status: Trade Association
- Headquarters: San Francisco, California
- Region served: Pacific Coast
- President & CEO: Stephen Hennessey
- Main organ: Board of Directors
- Website: pmanet.org

The Pacific Maritime Association (PMA) is a non-profit organization based in San Francisco, California that represents employers of the shipping industry on the Pacific coast.

== Background ==
The Pacific Maritime Association was founded in 1949 as a non-profit corporation. It represented a merger of the Waterfront Employers Association (WEA) and the American Shipowners Association (ASA). Its principal business is to negotiate and administer labor agreements with the International Longshore and Warehouse Union (ILWU). PMA's 72 members are cargo carriers, terminal operators, and stevedores that operate along the U.S. West Coast.

In 1960, it negotiated the Mechanization and Modernization Agreement.

As of December 2012, PMA members employed nearly 14,000 registered longshore, clerk and foreman workers at 29 west coast ports in California, Oregon, and Washington, and thousands more “casual” workers, who typically work part-time. Since the 2002 agreement that brought the widespread use of technology to the West Coast, the registered workforce has increased by 32 percent.

In 2015, it negotiated a five-year contract with the ILWU.

== See also ==
- Taft-Hartley Act
- United States Maritime Alliance
