= The Highwaymen (film) =

2019 film directed by John Lee Hancock

- Official release poster
- Directed by: John Lee Hancock
- Written by: John Fusco
- Produced by: Casey Silver
- Starring: Kevin Costner; Woody Harrelson; Kathy Bates; John Carroll Lynch; Kim Dickens; Thomas Mann; William Sadler
- Cinematography: John Schwartzman
- Edited by: Robert Frazen
- Music by: Thomas Newman
- Production company: Casey Silver Productions
- Distributed by: Netflix
- Release dates: March 10, 2019 (SXSW); March 15, 2019 (United States)
- Running time: 132 minutes
- Country: United States
- Language: English
- Budget: $49 million

The Highwaymen is a 2019 American period crime thriller film directed by John Lee Hancock and written by John Fusco. The film stars Kevin Costner and Woody Harrelson as Frank Hamer and Maney Gault, two former Texas Rangers who attempt to track down and apprehend notorious criminals Bonnie and Clyde in the 1930s. Kathy Bates, John Carroll Lynch, Kim Dickens, Thomas Mann and William Sadler also star.

The film had been in development hell for many years, with producer Casey Silver looking into the project as early as 2005. Originally pitched by Fusco as a possible Paul Newman and Robert Redford project, the film began development at Universal Pictures but never came to fruition. In February 2018, it was reported Netflix had picked up the rights to the film and that Costner and Harrelson would star. Filming took place later that month and in March, shooting around Louisiana and at several historical sites, including the road where Bonnie and Clyde were killed.

The Highwaymen had a limited theatrical release in the United States on March 15, 2019, before being released digitally on March 29, 2019, on Netflix. It received mixed reviews from critics.

== Plot ==
In 1934, after two years on the run, criminals Bonnie Parker and Clyde Barrow break several associates out of Texas' Eastham Prison Farm. Texas Department of Corrections Chief Lee Simmons persuades Governor "Ma" Ferguson to hire former Texas Ranger Frank Hamer to track them down.

After the fugitive gang is involved in a devastating shootout in Missouri, Hamer reluctantly leaves retirement and his wife Gladys to join the manhunt. He recruits his former partner, Benjamin Maney Gault, despite his misgivings about Gault's sobriety and decayed policing abilities. Hamer refuses to share the driving with him.

Information from FBI wiretapping of the fugitives' families leads Hamer and Gault to conclude that Bonnie and Clyde are returning "home" to Dallas. Watching Bonnie's mother's house, they see a man throw a bottle into her yard, which is soon thrown back, but a boy escapes with it.

Dismissing the Rangers' theory, the FBI believe the fugitives are in Brownsville. Hamer and Gault meet with Dallas Sheriff "Smoot" Schmid, who introduces them to Deputy Sheriff Ted Hinton, a childhood friend who can identify the pair on sight. The gang kills two policemen in nearby Grapevine; Hamer and Gault investigate the scene and determine that Bonnie has a rabbit, which Hinton suggests is a present for a family member.

The Rangers drive to Oklahoma and question a gas station attendant, who supports the criminals. Hamer gets the man to admit the gang passed through en route to a migrant camp, where a local girl confirms they stayed. A radio bulletin alerts the Rangers to two more murdered officers happening outside their jurisdiction. They are barred from passing the police roadblock, which a frustrated Hamer drives around.

They continue to Coffeyville, Kansas, correctly deducing that Bonnie and Clyde will stop there for supplies. As the Rangers move in on the fugitives, an adoring crowd surrounds the criminals' car. Hamer and Gault give chase, but Bonnie and Clyde escape through a dirt field.

Learning that Clyde had breakfast in Amarillo, the Rangers return to Dallas to find the rabbit has been delivered to Bonnie's family. Hamer meets Henry Barrow, Clyde's father, who affirms that his son must be stopped. The Rangers have Simmons furlough Wade McNabb, an incarcerated associate of the gang, hoping to draw them out.

While Hamer interrogates McNabb at a bar, Gault is threatened in the restroom by thugs sympathetic to the gang, but he subdues them. Learning that Bonnie plans to meet a hairdresser the next day, the Rangers surveil her mother's house again. A man throws another bottle into the yard, which is retrieved by the same boy but intercepted by the Rangers; it contains a message that the gang are heading elsewhere. Realizing McNabb warned the gang, the Rangers visit his home, but find him beaten to death.

Simmons recalls Hamer and Gault to Austin, but they return to their theory that "outlaws always go home", predicting that the fugitives are going to Bienville Parish, Louisiana, home of gang member Henry Methvin's father, Ivy. Searching Ivy's house, the Rangers find evidence of the outlaws' recent stay. They join forces with local Sheriff Henderson Jordan and Deputy Prentiss Oakley to confront Ivy; in exchange for his son's safety, he reveals that the gang will soon return.

The lawmen are joined by Hinton and Dallas Sheriff's Deputy Bob Alcorn, and Gault tells them of his first deployment with Hamer: they killed a gang of bandits, including a fleeing 13-year-old boy. Ivy informs them the gang is arriving the next day, and the posse prepare an ambush on the road to his house, staging his truck as if it has broken down.

Bonnie and Clyde arrive, stopping to assist Ivy, and Hamer orders them to raise their hands. Instead, the criminals prepare to draw their own weapons, but are gunned down. The bullet-riddled car with Bonnie and Clyde's bodies is towed to Arcadia, Louisiana and mobbed by onlookers. Refusing $1,000 for an interview with the Associated Press, Hamer and Gault drive home. En route, Hamer allows Gault to drive.

== Cast ==
- Kevin Costner as Frank Hamer
- Woody Harrelson as Maney Gault
- John Carroll Lynch as Lee Simmons
- Thomas Mann as Deputy Ted Hinton
- Kim Dickens as Gladys Hamer
- W. Earl Brown as Ivy Methvin
- William Sadler as Henry Barrow
- Kathy Bates as Ma Ferguson
- David Furr as Detective John Quinn
- Josh Caras as Wade McNabb
- Emily Brobst and Edward Bossert as Bonnie Parker and Clyde Barrow, respectively

== Production ==
=== Development ===
Around 2005, producer Casey Silver began to develop The Highwaymen, an original pitch from John Fusco that once had Paul Newman and Robert Redford poised to play the veteran Texas Rangers who put an end to the violent robbery spree of Bonnie and Clyde.

The project had been a long-time goal of Fusco's to portray Texas Ranger Frank Hamer in the proper light of history. Fusco researched extensively in Texas and became friends with Hamer's son, the late Frank Hamer Jr. By 2013, the project was under development at Universal Pictures.

On June 21, 2017, it was reported that Netflix was in negotiations to extricate the production from Universal Pictures. At the time of the report, Netflix was in early discussions with Woody Harrelson and Kevin Costner for the two lead roles and with John Lee Hancock as director. The script was written by John Fusco. Casey Silver, who had been developing the project while it was at Universal, was set to produce.

On February 12, 2018, it was announced by Netflix that the film had entered production. Hancock was officially confirmed as director, and Harrelson, Costner, and Silver were confirmed as producers. They were set to produce alongside Michael Malone and Rod Lake.

=== Casting ===
Alongside the announcement of the film entering production, it was confirmed that Costner and Harrelson would be playing Frank Hamer and Maney Gault, respectively. In addition, it was announced that Kathy Bates, John Carroll Lynch, Kim Dickens, Thomas Mann, and William Sadler had also joined the cast.

=== Filming ===
Principal photography for the film commenced on February 12, 2018, in New Orleans, Louisiana and was expected to last until April 10, 2018. The production was set to film in other locations around the state including Covington, LaPlace, Baton Rouge, and Garyville. Additionally, scenes for Coffeyville, KS were shot in Hammond. On February 21, 2018, filming took place at Laurel Valley Plantation in Thibodaux, Louisiana. The production moved to Donaldsonville, Louisiana where filming took place through February 26, 2018, and reportedly shut down an area of the town’s historic district. It was here that film makers shot scenes for the West Dallas Viaduct (the Devil's Back Porch) where Parker and Barrow grew up. On March 5, 2018, filming occurred in Baton Rouge where the Old Louisiana Governor's Mansion acted as a stand in for the Texas Governor's Mansion. Production reportedly caused streets surrounding it to be blocked off for the majority of the day.

From March 21 to 25, 2018, filming took place on Louisiana Highway 154. Reportedly, the production was reenacting the killing of Bonnie Parker and Clyde Barrow near where the actual event took place. To recreate the scene on what is now an asphalt two-lane highway, the film crew planted trees along the right-of-way and added dirt to cover the blacktop road. Later that month, filming took place on an old U.S. Route 380 bridge that sits southwest of Newcastle, Texas crossing the Brazos River; this bridge was a stand-in for the old Young County Bridge on the Red River between Texas and Oklahoma which had been closed down decades earlier. Principal photography for the film concluded on March 29, 2018, in Shreveport, Louisiana. The production reportedly had a budget of $49 million.

== Release ==
The film premiered at the Paramount Theatre in Austin, Texas on March 10, 2019, during the South by Southwest film festival, as part of the "Headliners" series of screenings. It then began a limited theatrical release on March 15, 2019, before beginning to stream digitally on March 29, 2019, on Netflix. In April 2019, Netflix reported that 40 million households had watched the film during its first month of release.

== Reception ==
On review aggregator Rotten Tomatoes, the film holds an approval rating of 58% based on 142 reviews, with an average rating of 6/10. The website's critical consensus reads, "The Highwaymen depicts law enforcement's side of the Bonnie and Clyde manhunt -- a story that's unfortunately not quite as entertaining despite its marquee leads." On Metacritic, the film has a weighted average score of 58 out of 100, based on 28 critics, indicating "mixed or average reviews". The film received a nomination for the Satellite Award for Best Miniseries or Television Film in 2020.

== See also ==
- Arthur Penn's 1967 film Bonnie and Clyde, starring Warren Beatty and Faye Dunaway
- Contemporary Western
