= Shannon J. Wall =

American labor leader (1919–2007)

Shannon J. Wall (March 4, 1919, Portland, Oregon – February 2, 2007) was a merchant seaman and an American labor leader. He was president of the National Maritime Union (or NMU, now part of the Seafarers International Union of North America) from 1973 to 1990. His father and mother ran a small dry cleaning company.

He joined the United States Merchant Marine and became a merchant seaman. He joined the NMU shortly thereafter. When the Merchant Marine was incorporated into the U.S. armed forces during World War II, he became a boatswain and served in the Pacific on both freight and troop carriers.

In 1951, he was appointed a staff representative (or "port patrolman") for a union local in San Francisco, California, roaming the port and talking to workers to ensure the union's contract was being honored. He became a staff representative in San Pedro, California, in 1954. As he rose within the union's ranks, he moved to New Jersey to represent the union in East Coast shipping matters.

Wall was elected the national union's vice president in 1958, and served three two-year terms. In 1964, he was elected the national union's secretary-treasurer.

== Presidency of NMU ==
Wall was elected interim president of the NMU on March 5, 1973. He was only the second president in the union's history. Incumbent president Joseph Curran had been accused of financial improprieties. Wall was formally elected president on June 12, 1973.

During Wall's presidency, the NMU shed nearly half its membership. The increasing use of flags of convenience cut deeply into the number of American merchant seamen. The use of much larger ships (reducing the number of transports needed to move the same amount of goods) and technological innovation (reducing the number of seamen needed to man a ship) also led to significant reductions in eligible members. Wall was a strong proponent of mergers between various maritime unions, and the organizing of an international union to cover all maritime workers.

Throughout the 1970s, Wall was a strong voice in the debate over national energy policy. He pushed for at least 20 percent of imported oil to be carried on ships flying the American flag, lobbied against the sale of Alaskan oil to Japan, and demanded that liquefied natural gas be carried on ships and not pipelines from Alaska to continental U.S. ports.

In 1975, a dissident NMU member was awarded $333,500 damages in suit filed against Curran, Wall and another NMU officer. The suit alleged that Wall and the others had maliciously prosecuted the member after he had criticized the NMU leadership.

In 1978, Wall won a new contract with Atlantic and Gulf of Mexico shippers which hiked wages 32 percent over a three-year period.

Although Wall had been an early endorser of Jimmy Carter as president, his union broke with the AFL-CIO to endorse Ronald Reagan.

Wall was re-elected for a fourth term as president in 1983 after a bitterly contested campaign. Wall received 9,958 votes and his opponent, Kirby-Smith McDowell, had 4,140 votes. Although no investigation by the United States Department of Labor was undertaken, Senator William V. Roth Jr. (R-Delaware) argued that significant violations of federal labor law had taken place in the election.

=== Mergers ===
In 1988, Wall helped craft a merger between the NMU and the Marine Engineers Beneficial Association (MEBA). After the merger, Wall became chair of the unlicensed seamen's division of District 1, and an MEBA executive vice president. At the time of the merger, NMU had 30,000 members—which included about 14,000 members working in commissaries, dining facilities and other units in U.S. naval military bases overseas.

The merger did not last. MEBA members charged that the merger referendum was rigged by MEBA president C.E. "Gene" DeFries. The accusations were so serious that the United States Department of Justice began an investigation. Union members were even more outraged when they learned DeFries and five other union officers paid themselves more than $2 million in severance payments.

NMU disaffiliated from the Marine Engineers in 1993. Louis Parise was elected the newly independent union's president. In 1999, NMU became an autonomous affiliate of the Seafarers International Union of North America, and 2001 fully merged with that union.

=== Legal and legislative achievement ===
Roughly 250,000 merchant seamen served (many under combat conditions) during World War II. The Merchant Marine service suffered the highest casualty rate of any service during the war. However, they were not recognized as military veterans and were not able to obtain veteran's benefits or health care.

In 1987, Wall and others sued the federal government to win designation as veterans for merchant seamen who served from December 7, 1941, to December 15, 1945. A federal district court, ruling in Schumacher v. Aldridge, 665 F. Supp. 41 (1987), agreed.

Even after his retirement, Wall continued to press for legislative recognition of the contributions of merchant seamen during World War II. On October 14, 1998, President Bill Clinton signed the Ocean Shipping Reform Act of 1998 (P.L. 105–258), which extended to December 31, 1946, the cut-off under which merchant marines would still be considered veterans of World War II (making the date the same as for other branches of the military).

Wall also won a legislative battle to have the United States collect federal taxes on foreign-flagged cruise ship companies. The law was changed by Congress in 1986 to give the Internal Revenue Service the authority to collect the taxes.

== Retirement and death ==
Wall retired from the merged MEBA-NMU union in 1990.

In February 1991, Wall became president of a new group, the International Organization of Professional Seamen. Wall formed the group to organize workers aboard U.S.-owned vessels flying under a foreign flag of convenience. However, the Seafarers International Union and International Longshoremen's Association both vehemently opposed the group, as its jurisdiction would conflict with their own. The collapse of the unionization effort led Wall to retire from union life.

Wall died of natural causes at his home in Sequim, Washington, on February 2, 2007. Wall and his wife, Lucy, had two sons and a daughter.

== Other roles ==
During his long career, Wall served on several boards and commissions.

For many years, he was the chair of the AFL-CIO's Maritime Committee, which acts as a lobbying organization for most AFL-CIO-affiliated maritime unions.

In 1982, Republican Party chairman Richard Richards appointed Wall to a labor advisory committee aimed at building Republican Party ties to union members.

In 1986, President Reagan appointed Wall to the President's Commission on Merchant Marine and Defense. As part of the commission, he helped write four reports which heavily criticized the reduction in the size of the U.S. merchant navy and advocated for wide-ranging changes in U.S. maritime and defense law. Reagan also appointed Wall to the President's Commission of White House Fellowships.

Wall was also a member of the board of directors of the American Merchant Marine Library Association and a member of the advisory board of the National Maritime Historical Society.

== Honors ==
In 1987, Wall received the Admiral of the Ocean Sea Award from the United Seamen's Service, a prestigious nonprofit association which provides assistance to American seamen in foreign ports.

The same year, the New York State AFL-CIO awarded Wall its Labor Recognition Award for his service in building the labor movement.

== Notes ==
Preceded by Joseph Curran	President, National Maritime Union; 1973-1991	Succeeded by Louis Parise, Sr.
