= Strikes in the United States in the 1930s =

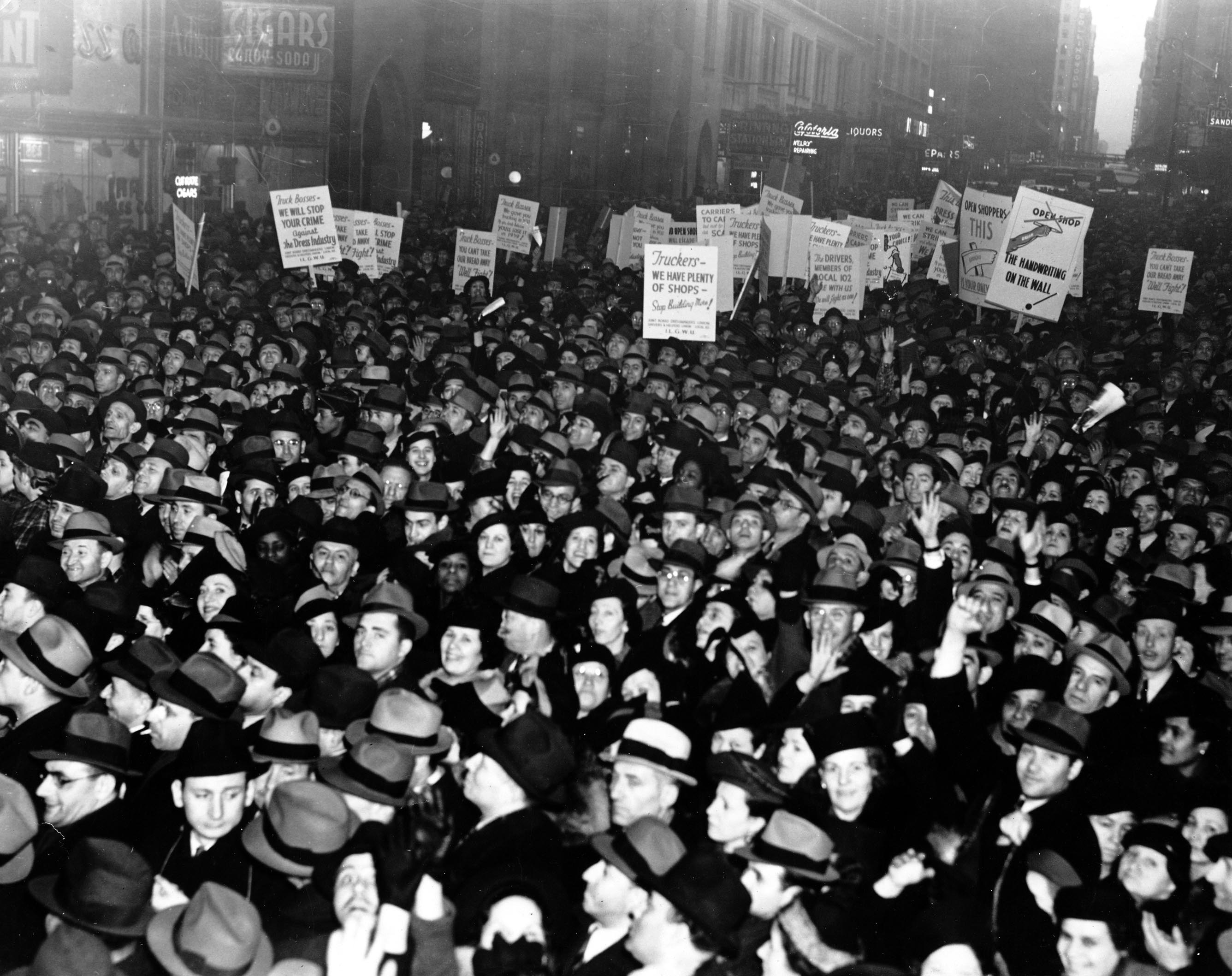
Workers gather in the streets of New York during the 1933 Dressmakers' Strike to urge unionization (Kheel Center, Cornell University)

Strikes in the United States in the 1930s played a major role in reshaping the economy as it recovered from the Great Depression. Unions gained millions of members for unions in the American Federation of Labor (AFL) and the new Congress of Industrial Organizations (CIO). Energized by successful strikes in major industries with the help of New Deal agencies, the unions played a major role in Democratic Party efforts to reelect President Franklin D. Roosevelt in 1936, as well as 1940 and 1944.

== Overview ==
Between 1930 and 1941, 27,000 work stoppages led to a loss of 172 million labor days, and about 90 deaths. As the economy declined workers were angry but management was losing money and could not afford to raise wages, so the strikes usually failed. This caused desperation among workers and union leaders. However, as the economy shot up starting in summer 1933, labor knew that management would negotiate rather than lose markets and profits. The New Deal unintentionally fueled labor militancy, giving unions a powerful tool in the National Labor Relations Act of 1935, known as the "Wagner Act." It set up the National Labor Relations Board. Rank-and-file workers, who initiated most stoppages by walking out or sitting down, weighed their lost wages versus the long-term benefits of union membership if they won. The main gains were made by the old established unions belonging to the American Federation of Labor (AFL), and even more dramatically by the Congress of Industrial Organizations (CIO), which split from the AFL in 1935. John L. Lewis of the coal miners' union used his organizers to unionize the nation's steel, auto, rubber and electrical plants. Organized labor's unprecedented accomplishments during this era were impossible without the aid of strikes. However, the AFL and CIO became bitter rivals in 1937, as the economy suddenly went into reverse and the conservative Republicans made major gains in the 1938 elections.

=== Federal role ===
The involvement of the federal government in labor disputes caused a gradual weakening of employers' power. To address the demands of trade unionists, Congress enacted the Norris–La Guardia Act in 1932. It blocked federal courts from issuing injunctions that helped management. It also stopped federal courts from enforcing yellow-dog contracts in which workers promised not to join a union. The National Industrial Recovery Act of 1933 (NIRA), specifically Section 7(a), went further: it gave workers the right to join unions of their choice and collectively bargain with management. These new laws had an immediate impact as the number of strikes doubled, with triple the number of strikers.

== Notable strikes ==
Date	Strike	Place
1930	Imperial Valley lettuce strike of 1930	Imperial Valley, California
1931	Tampa cigar makers' strike of 1931	Tampa, Florida
1931	Santa Clara cannery strike	Santa Clara, California
1931	Harlan County War	Harlan County, Kentucky
1932	Century Airlines pilots' strike	Chicago, Illinois
1933	Briggs Manufacturing Company strike	Detroit, Michigan
1933	1933 Funsten Nut strike	Greater St. Louis
1933	California agricultural strikes of 1933	California
1933	El Monte berry strike	California
1933–34	Harriman Hosiery Mills strike	Roane County, Tennessee
1934	Kohler strike	Sheboygan, Wisconsin
1934	1934 New York hotel strike	New York City
1934	Auto-Lite strike	Toledo, Ohio
1934	Minneapolis general strike of 1934	Minneapolis, Minnesota
1934	1934 West Coast waterfront strike	U.S. West Coast
1934	Hardin County onion pickers strike	Hardin County, Ohio
1934	Textile workers' strike (1934)	New England, Mid-Atlantic region and U.S. southern states
1934–35	1934–35 Milwaukee sales clerks' strike	Milwaukee
1935	Pacific Northwest lumber strike	U.S. Pacific Northwest
1935	1935 Gulf Coast longshoremen's strike	U.S. Gulf Coast
1936	Venice celery strike	Los Angeles County, California
1936	Gulf Coast maritime workers' strike	U.S. Gulf Coast
1936–37	Pacific Coast maritime workers' strike	U.S. Pacific Coast
1936	Goodyear rubber strike	Akron, Ohio
1936	Citrus strike	California
1936–37	Flint sit-down strike	Flint, Michigan
1936–37	Remington Rand strike of 1936–1937	New York City
1937	Little Steel strike including Memorial Day massacre of 1937	nationwide
1937	Stockton cannery strike of 1937	California
1937	1937 Lewiston–Auburn shoe strike	Lewiston, Maine and Auburn, Maine
1938	1938 San Antonio pecan shellers strike	San Antonio
1938	1938 New York City truckers strike	New York City
1938	Hilo massacre	Hilo, Hawaii
1939	Tool and die strike of 1939	Detroit, Michigan

== 1934 wave ==
=== San Francisco ===
In 1934, there was a large strike wave with 1.5 million workers going on strike for long-term union recognition, rather than immediate wage or hour concerns. National attention focused on the San Francisco docks when longshoremen formed a new local of the International Longshoremen's Association (ILA) and went on strike in May 1934 due to the national ILA leadership ignoring their concerns. Shipping companies hired vigilantes to beat strikers, and police opened fire on a crowd of unarmed strikers, killing two and injuring many more. A short-lived general strike of 125,000 workers ensued in the city. By the end of July, under the leadership of left-wing firerbrand Harry Bridges, dockworkers won their main demand for a union-controlled hiring hall. Their new union was the International Longshore and Warehouse Union (ILWU).

=== Minneapolis general strike of 1934 ===
The Minneapolis general strike of 1934 began on May 16, 1934, when truck drivers in Minneapolis, Minnesota went on strike to demand better working conditions and wages. The strike quickly spread to other industries in the city, including warehouse workers, laundry workers, and others. By the end of the month, over 40,000 workers were on strike, effectively shutting down much of the city's economy. The strike was marked by violent clashes between strikers and police, with the worst violence occurring on July 20, 1934, which became known as "Bloody Friday." Police shot into a crowd of unarmed strikers, killing two and injuring many others. The Haas–Dunnigan mediation plan of July 25, 1934, which proposed ending the strike, reinstating all workers, and holding National Labor Board elections—but which was effectively sabotaged when the employers demanded dropping key clauses like minimum wages and full reinstatement—illustrated how employer resistance repeatedly blocked compromise during the strike. Despite the violence, the strike continued, and eventually, the workers' demands were met. The success of the strike helped to galvanize the labor movement in the United States and led to the establishment of the Teamsters union, which went on to become one of the most powerful labor unions in the country.

=== Textile strikes 1934 ===
The textile strike of 1934 was a nationwide three-week effort by a million textile workers, especially in North Carolina, South Carolina and Georgia. At the same time there were local strikes in the North led by the United Textile Workers of America (UTW) of the American Federation of Labor. The Southern strike was led by the newly formed National Textile Workers Union (NTWU), and focused on wages and working conditions. The industry was hard hit by the depression and management had imposed new control that were despised, especially struggling employers imposed the hated stretchout tactics of reduced breaks, increased machine-tending and quotas, and more intense supervision. The new rules violated the informal work standards the workers themselves had developed, and they though they had the active support of President Roosevelt. The textile industry was one of the largest employers in the South at the time, and it fought back hard. They hired replacement workers and had the governors call in the National Guard. In the North strikers generally were successful. In the South the strike failed. Few strikers were rehired, and the union movement was demoralized.

=== Kohler strike ===
The Kohler strike began in the small town of Kohler, Wisconsin, on April 5, 1934, when over 2,000 workers walked off the job at Kohler Co. They demanded higher pay and better working conditions. The company hired replacement workers. It turned violent on April 20, when police fired on a group of picketers, killing two and injuring many others. The incident became known as the "Kohler massacre" and caused widespread sympathy for the strikers. The strike was settled on June 6, 1934, when the Kohler Company agreed to a 15% wage increase and improvements in working conditions. The strike was hailed a major victory for labor unions and helped pave the way for increased worker protections and unionization across the nation. Management never accepted the notion that national policy called for recognition of unions that had worker support. Kohler mobilized national anti-union interests and became the scene of three more decades of bitter labor disputes that were expensive for both sides.

== Rubber in 1936 ==
Rubber workers struck five different rubber companies over the course of several months in Akron, Ohio. The workers at the largest factory, Goodyear invented a new tactic—the sitdown strike whereby the strikers seize the plant, stop production, and keep strikebreakers out. Goodyear gave up, and recognized the United Rubber Workers (URW). It was a major victory for the labor movement, established the United Rubber Workers as a major union in the rubber industry, and provided a new tactic for future labor struggles.

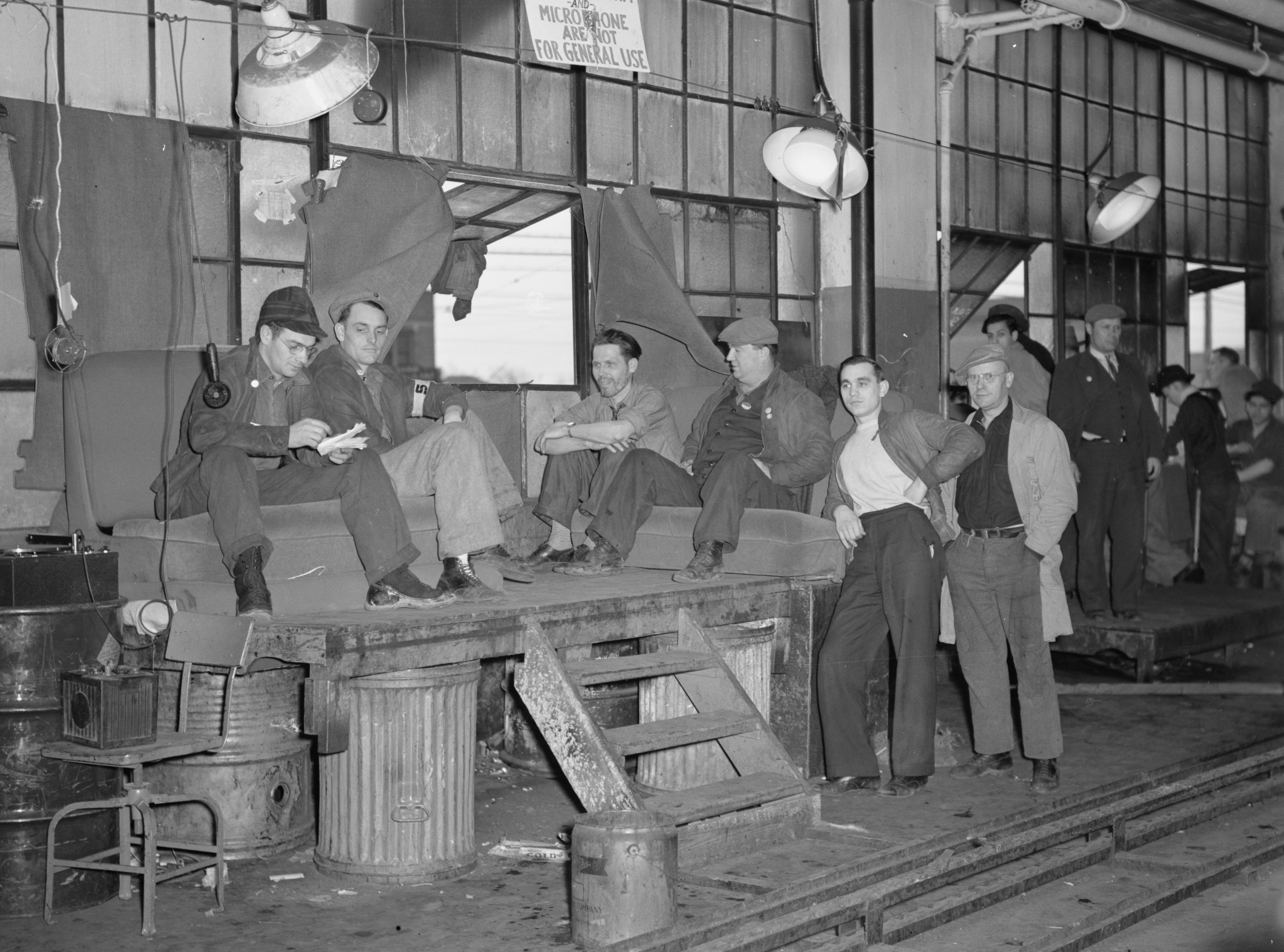
Sit-down strikers guarding window entrance to Fisher body plant 1937.

== GM in 1937 ==
Kohler was a local strike against a local company. The Flint strike of 1935-36 started as a small operation against the nation's largest corporation, General Motors (GM). The Flint sit-in workers adopted the new sitdown tactic recently invented by the rubber workers at Goodyear. They did not leave the plant—they occupied it blocking strikebreakers. The strike began on December 30, 1936, when workers at the Fisher Body Plant No. 1 stopped working and just sat down inside the factory. Production stopped. The sit-down strike quickly spread to other GM plants in Michigan and across the country, with more than 100,000 workers taking part. The strike lasted for 44 days. Flint was decisive because the strikers won by shutting down this plant—and soon most GM plants—while Ford and other competitors kept producing cars. GM gave up and recognized the United Automobile Workers union, and gave a 5% raise. Recognition set the standard for heavy industry—major corporations realized they had to bargain with their unions. The Flint sit-down was a turning point in labor history, as it demonstrated the power of workers to collectively organize. The issue of pay was less important than having a voice. It paved the way for the widespread unionization of the American auto industry and helped to establish the UAW as a major force in American labor.

== Little Steel in 1937 ==
The steel industry was one of the largest and most important. The new CIO succeeded in organizing without a strike U.S. Steel in 1937. However "Little Steel"—six companies next in size—resisted furiously. According to Bruce Nelson, the Steel Workers Organizing Committee (SWOC), was established in 1936 by John L. Lewis, president of both the United Mine Workers of America (UMW) and the new Congress of Industrial Organizations (CIO). Although no steel workers were involved in it at first, the goal was to use UMW and CIO organizers to unionize the nation's great steel industry. Lewis appointed Philip Murray, to head of SWOC, and most of the organizers were on loan from the miners' union. SWOC was influenced by UMW's policies, and many of its officials were also UMW officials.

Lewis was consulted on every major activity. He and his team believed that the steel industry's rigidly hierarchical and autocratic structure required a centralized and responsible union. They waged a series of militant strikes, especially the "Little Steel" strike of 1937, that challenged the traditional image of a stable, strong, and unified union. Murray proclaimed a policy of "complete racial equality" concerning SWOC membership. This was referring to European ethnic groups plus Blacks. The strong Communist element in SWOC was promoting the equal inclusion of Black workers. SWOC first goal was to seize the industry's company unions, known as Employee Representation Plans (ERPs), which SWOC aimed to capture from within. By January 1937, many of the ERPs had voted to join SWOC, which claimed to have a membership of 125,000. However, in March 1937, U.S. Steel, which controlled 40% of the industry, signed a collective bargaining agreement with SWOC. US Steel realized tha Roosevelt's reelection in 1936, plus the success of the autoworkers at General Motors, meant union recognition was inevitable.

The Little Steel strike was a violent 1937 labor strike by SWOC against dour smaller steel companies led by Republic Steel, and including Bethlehem Steel, Inland Steel, and Youngstown Sheet and Tube. The strike aimed to achieve union recognition among 81,000 workers in 29 plants. It failed. The opposition was energetically led by Republic's Tom M. Girdler who used every level of force, money and political connections to stymie SWOC. Girdler had advantages: The time was not ripe as the economy was in a sharp recession; SWOC was under attack by the AFL as dual unionism, and by conservatives as infiltrated by Communists. Worst of all, a peaceful rally in Chicago ended in the Memorial Day Massacre as police fired on the crowd, killing ten and ruining the confidence of the strikers. Little Steel defied SWOC in 1937 but when the defense buildup was in high gear in 1941 Washington forced them to accept the unions. SWOC prevailed and swept the industry, becoming the United Steelworkers of America in 1942.

== See also ==
- John L. Lewis
- Labor history of the United States
- Labor history of the United States§Organized labor, 1929–1955
- Timeline of United States history (1930–1949)
- Category:1930s strikes in the United States
- Venice celery strike (1936)
