= 1936 Pacific Coast maritime workers' strike =

Labor strike on the US West Coast

The 1936 Pacific Coast maritime workers' strike was a 99-day strike of sailors and longshore workers from October 1936 to February 1937 located on the West Coast of the United States. The strike involved over 37,000 workers and paralyzed the entire Pacific Coast shipping industry.

The Gulf Coast strike was parallel to a similar Gulf Coast maritime strike, called almost simultaneously. Both strikes were catalysts for the formation of the National Maritime Union under union leader Joseph Curran.

== Background ==
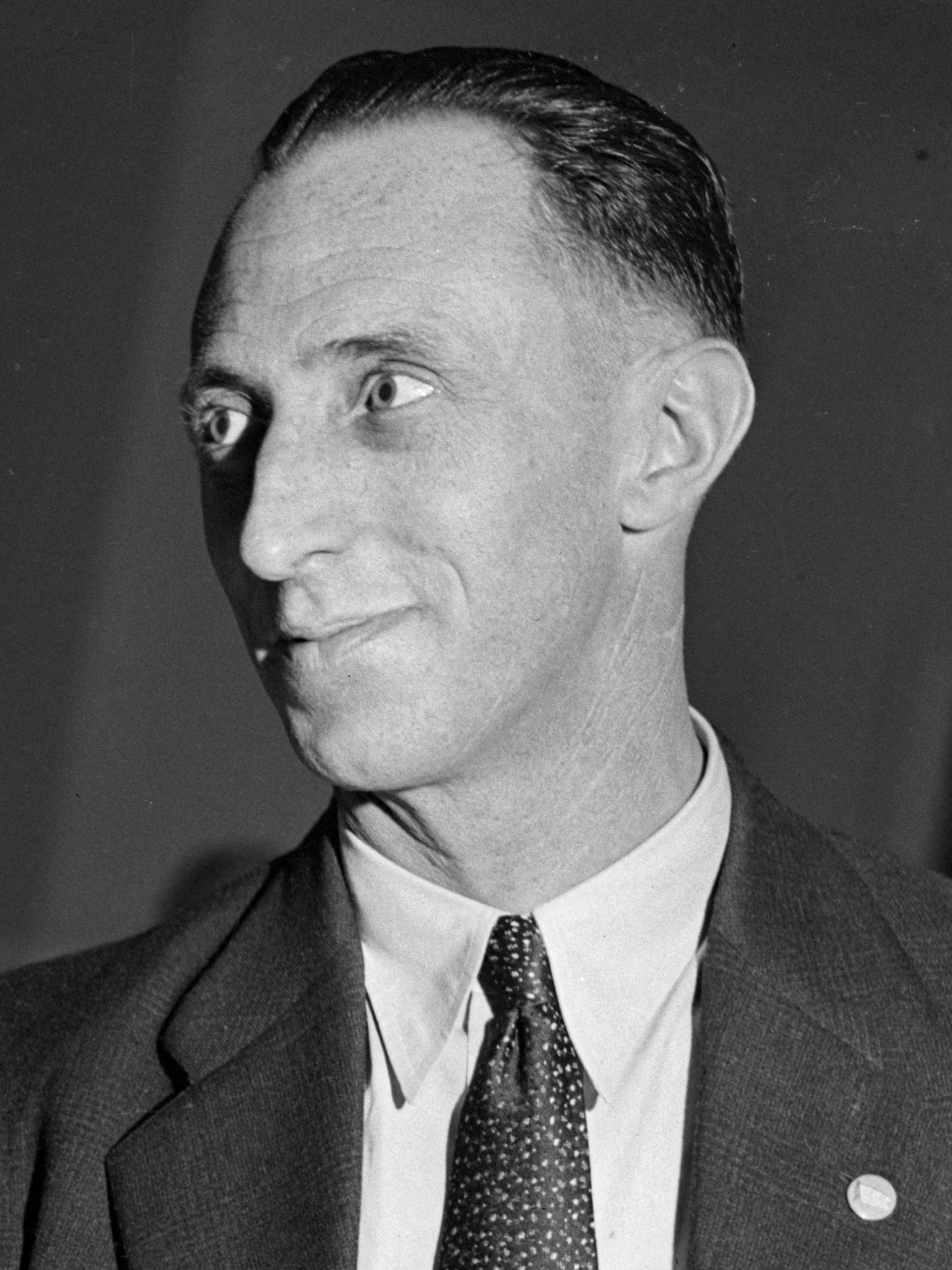
Harry Bridges emerged as a leader in the International Longshoremen's Association during the 1934 West Coast waterfront strike. He went on to establish the International Longshore and Warehouse Union in 1937.

In 1934, longshore workers went on strike for 83 days, resulting in the unionization of all West Coast ports, coast-wide collective bargaining, and union control of hiring halls. The strike also led to the emergence of Harry Bridges as a leader within the International Longshoremen's Association (ILA) on the West Coast. Unsettled tensions remained, however, as longshore workers sought to extend the gains they had won from the strike and waterfront employers desired to break the union. Workers in the Sailors' Union of the Pacific (SUP), led by Harry Lundeberg, also desired union control of their hiring halls, among other grievances.

Following the 1934 strike, the SUP and ILA on the West Coast formed a united banner as the Maritime Federation of the Pacific. In both unions, finding work stoppages to be highly effective, workers engaged in "quickie strikes" to address grievances on the job.

== Strike called ==
After months of negotiations between the unions and shipping companies with federal intervention by the Roosevelt administration, an agreement was unable to be reached, and a strike was called on October 29. All shipping on the West Coast came to a standstill the next day. Assistant Secretary of Labor Edward F. McGrady intervened to prevent disruptions to the US food supply chain. Unlike the 1934 strike, the 1936 strike saw little violence.

The 1936 Gulf Coast maritime strike paralleled the West Coast strike. The Gulf Coast strike was concentrated mostly in Texas among maritime workers who had formed their own banner, the Maritime Federation of the Gulf Coast, modeled after Bridges' and Lundeberg's coalition. In solidarity with the striking workers, the Seamen's Defense Council, a rank-and-file group from the International Seamen's Union, announced a strike in New York. This action was opposed by the union's leaders. Similar actions were announced by the Masters, Mates, and Pilots, the Marine Engineers' Beneficial Association, and the American Radio Telegraphists' Association. These actions were called off after suppression from union leadership and the Roosevelt administration.

== Results and aftermath ==
As a result of the strike, longshore workers and sailors won wage increases and improvements to their working conditions, longshore workers were able to maintain control over their hiring halls, and sailors won a similar agreement for their hiring halls. Shipping companies were unable to reinstate pre-1934 conditions and were forced to accept the unions as a permanent feature of the industry. The Maritime Federation of the Pacific, however, crumbled due to ongoing disputes between Bridges and Lundeberg. Both maritime strikes in 1936 on the West Coast and Gulf Coast became a catalyst for the formation of the National Maritime Union and the International Longshore and Warehouse Union.

== See also ==
- 1934 West Coast waterfront strike
- Strikes in the United States in the 1930s
