= Benjamin Maney Gault =

American lawman (1886–1947)

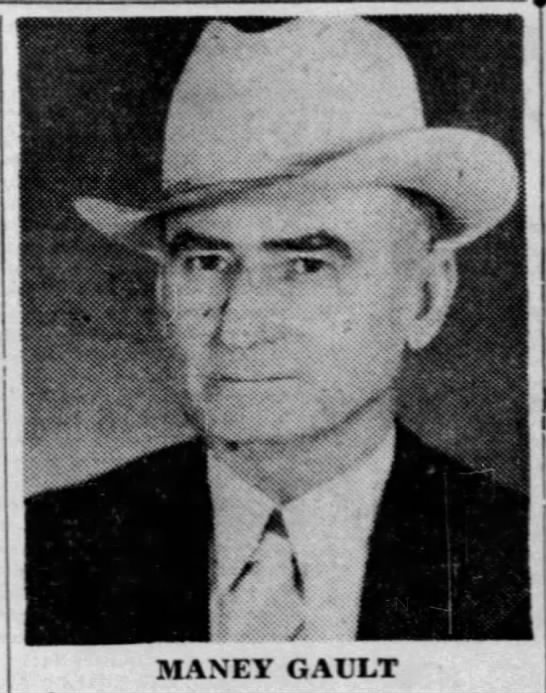
- Born: June 21, 1886; Travis County, Texas, U.S.
- Died: December 14, 1947 (aged 61); Austin, Texas, U.S.
- Resting place: Austin Memorial Park Cemetery
- Occupation(s): Lawman, Texas Ranger
- Years active: 1929-1947
- Known for: Participation in the 1934 ambush of Bonnie and Clyde
- Spouse: Rebecca Johnson Gault
- Children: 2

Benjamin Maney Gault (June 21, 1886 – December 14, 1947) was an American lawman and Texas Ranger, known for his role alongside Captain Frank Hamer in the 1934 ambush and killing of the outlaws Bonnie Parker and Clyde Barrow. He spent much of his career in law enforcement across rural Texas during the early 20th century, earning a reputation for quiet competence and loyalty. He later served as Captain of Company C of the Texas Rangers, overseeing criminal investigations in West Texas until his death.

== Early life ==
Gault was born on June 21, 1886, in Travis County, Texas, into a pioneering settler family. He grew up in the Austin area and worked in a variety of occupations before entering law enforcement, including stock and dairy farming, sawmill labor, and furniture making. His entrance into law enforcement came through his proximity and friendship with Frank Hamer, a prominent Texas Ranger who lived nearby. Gault began participating in investigations as a civilian and gained practical experience in undercover operations, particularly in Prohibition-era moonshine cases.

== Texas Ranger Career ==
=== Initial Appointment ===
Gault officially joined the Texas Rangers in 1929, recruited into the Headquarters Company by Hamer. At the time, Texas Rangers were involved in a wide array of operations, ranging from criminal investigations to suppressing mob violence and corruption. Gault developed a reputation for being principled, discreet, and dependable. His demeanor contrasted with the more imposing or flamboyant figures in the force, but he was considered an effective lawman in both rural and urban settings.

=== Temporary Departure and Return ===
During the early 1930s, Gault and other Rangers, including Hamer, left the force following political changes in state government, particularly under Governor Miriam "Ma" Ferguson, whose administration was known for its sweeping dismissals of Rangers. Gault transitioned briefly to work for the Texas Highway Patrol.

In 1934, the killing of two young Texas law officers by associates of Clyde Barrow led to renewed urgency in capturing the Barrow gang. At the request of the Texas Department of Corrections, Hamer was appointed as a special investigator to pursue Bonnie and Clyde. Hamer in turn invited Gault to join the manhunt, valuing his experience and discretion.

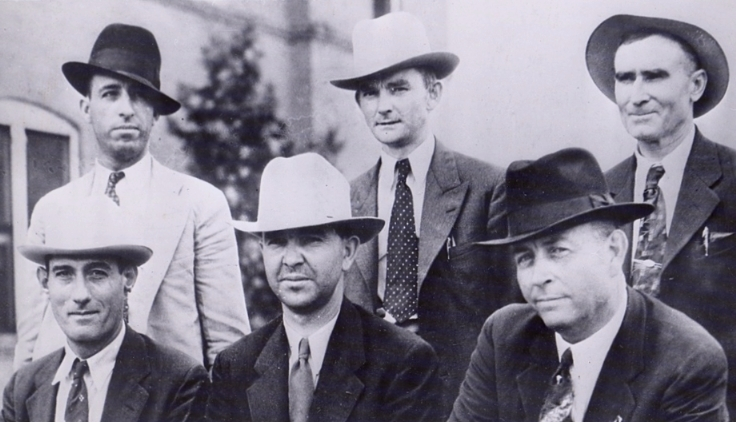
The six-man posse who killed Bonnie & Clyde May 23, 1934. Top, L to R: Hinton, Oakley, Gault; seated, L to R: Alcorn, Jordan and Frank Hamer.

=== Bonnie and Clyde Manhunt ===
Gault played a key role in the extended manhunt for Bonnie Parker and Clyde Barrow. Over the course of more than three months, Gault, Hamer, and a small posse tracked the fugitives across Texas, Louisiana, and surrounding states. Their pursuit culminated in a coordinated ambush on a rural road near Gibsland, Louisiana, on May 23, 1934. Gault and Hamer, along with officers from Louisiana and Dallas, opened fire on the couple’s vehicle, killing both Parker and Barrow instantly.

Although the event became nationally significant and controversial, Gault avoided the spotlight. He declined public appearances and refused interviews or offers related to his role in the ambush. His reluctance to capitalize on the fame distinguished him from others involved in the case.

=== Later career ===
Following the ambush, Gault returned to Ranger service and was appointed Captain of Company C, headquartered in Lubbock, Texas. His jurisdiction spanned a 94-county area in West Texas. Over the next decade, he managed numerous cases involving murder, robbery, and cattle theft. Known for his ability to manage investigations without unnecessary force or showmanship, Gault was respected by peers and subordinates alike.

During his time as Captain, he continued to collaborate occasionally with Hamer on specific investigations. Despite a quiet public presence, he remained a central figure in Ranger operations through the late 1930s and 1940s.

== Death and legacy ==
Gault became ill in late 1947 while working on a murder case. He died in Austin, Texas, on December 14, 1947, at the age of 61, following several weeks of illness. He was buried at Austin Memorial Park Cemetery.

Gault was survived by his wife, Rebecca Johnson Gault, their children, and extended family. At the time of his death, his colleagues and friends praised his integrity, courage, and steadfast character. Hamer, in particular, remembered him as “the best man I ever worked with”.

Despite his involvement in one of the most sensational criminal cases of the 20th century, Gault remained relatively obscure in public memory. He was reintroduced to popular culture in 2019 when actor Woody Harrelson portrayed a fictionalized version of him in the film The Highwaymen. The film emphasized his partnership with Hamer, though it took liberties with the historical record and combined elements of multiple lawmen into Gault’s character.
