= 1936 Gulf Coast maritime workers' strike =

The 1936 Gulf Coast maritime workers' strike was a labor action of the splinter union "Maritime Federation of the Gulf Coast" lasting from October 31, 1936, to January 21, 1937. The strike's main effects were felt in Houston and Galveston.

The Gulf Coast strike was parallel to a similar Pacific Coast maritime strike, called almost simultaneously. Both strikes were catalysts for the formation of the National Maritime Union under union leader Joseph Curran.

== Origins ==
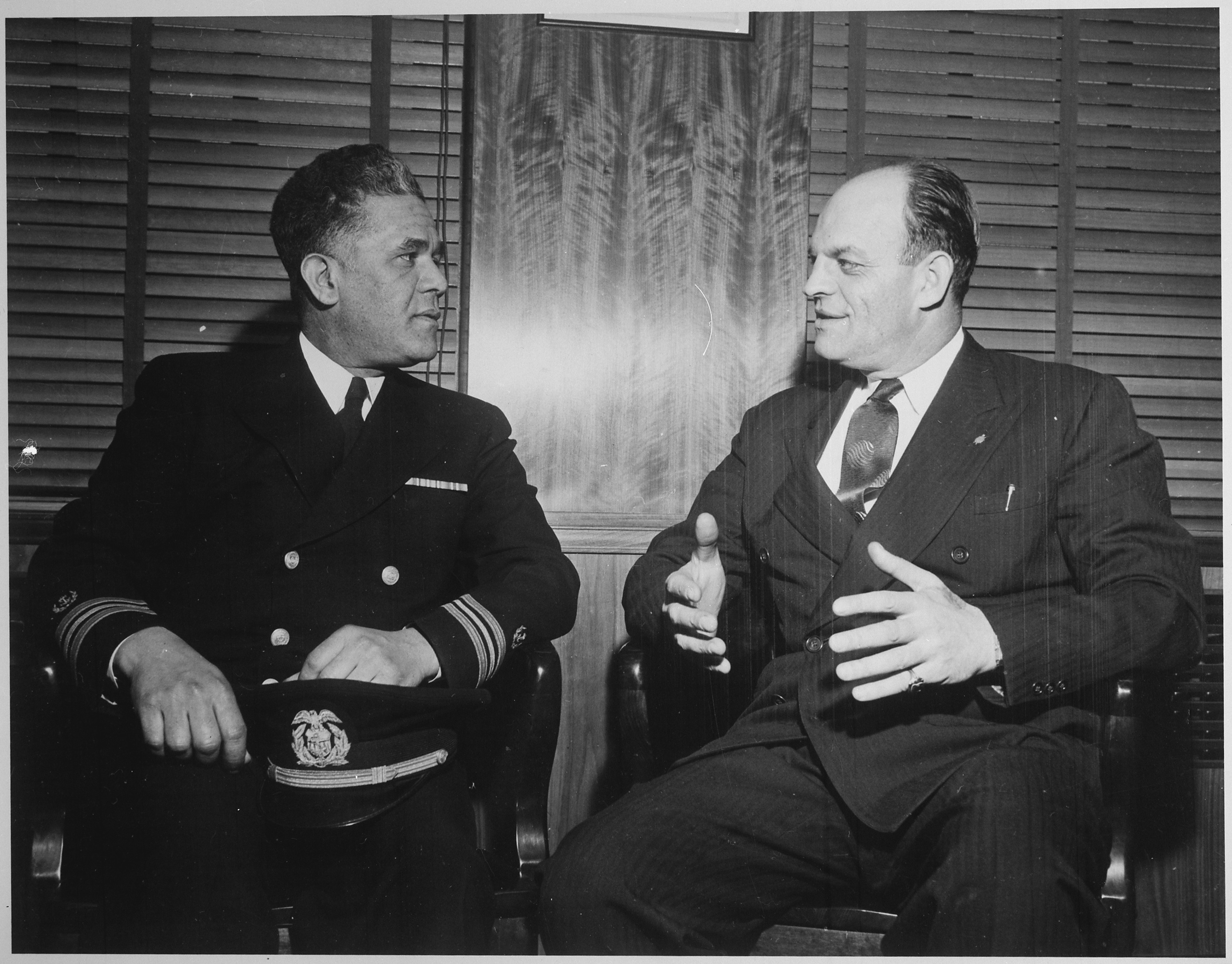
Curran, right, in the 1940s, with Captain Clifton Lastic of Liberty Ship (SS) Bert Williams

In Houston, New Orleans, and other major docks along the Gulf Coast, strikes and other labor conflict had been a regular annual occurrence through the 1930s. In July 1934, three black longshoremen had been shot to death in a firefight on the Houston docks during a strike. In 1935, longshoremen along the entire coast had struck from October 1 through November 27 to little avail except for 14 more killings.

Nationally, maritime workers had suffered declining wages and increasingly untenable working conditions under the leadership of the International Seamen's Union, which was perceived as corrupt and inefficient. One response was increasing numbers of wildcat strikes. In March 1936, Joseph Curran led a spontaneous four-day work stoppage on the docked SS California in San Pedro, California, attracting personal attention and a degree of support from U.S. Labor Secretary Frances Perkins.

Also, by March 1936, seamen and longshoremen of the Gulf Coast port cities had organized themselves as the "Maritime Federation of the Gulf Coast". In a New Orleans conference they named Wobbly Gilbert Mers of Corpus Christi as leader. The rejection of the ISU set the stage for street tension between unions and a long list of beatings and violent incident, throughout the year.

== Strike called ==
By his own description, in a letter to West Coast leader Harry Bridges, the biggest challenge facing Mers as head of this new organization was maintaining union solidarity across racial lines. Purportedly, a ban against black dockworkers in the ports of Brownsville and Port Isabel dated back to the Brownsville Affair of 1906. Nevertheless, another inspiration for the impending action was a small strike of black stewards on the SS Seminole of the Clyde-Mallory lines, who had refused to work in Galveston on June 13, and upon returning to New York prevented all the company's liners from sailing.

Joseph Curran came to Texas in August. His first organizing meeting with local workers at a club was unexpectedly raided by the Houston police, with Curran escaping police custody through a bathroom window.

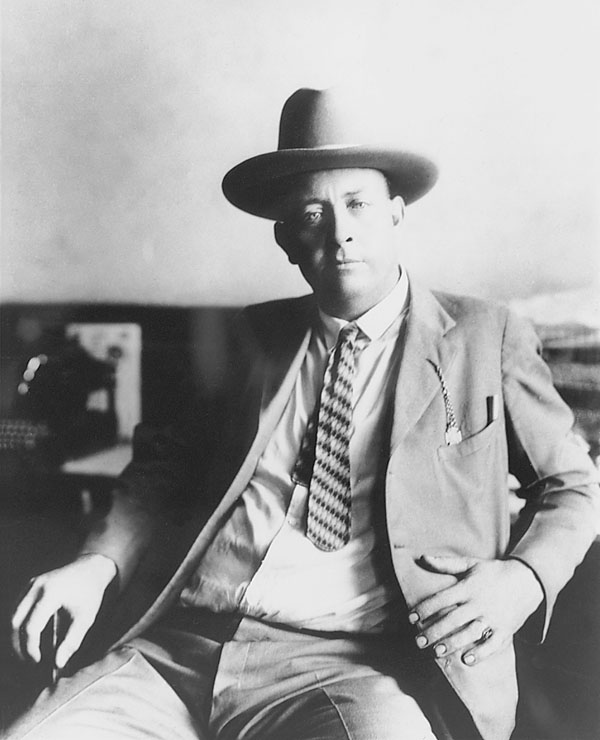
Frank Hamer, circa 1920s

On October 31 strikers of the Maritime Federation acted against an array of opponents. Their own former leadership in the International Seamen's Union not only disowned them, and had "beef gangs" chasing them through the street after dark since April, but eagerly branded them as Communists. In many cases, that was true. The Maritime Federation also were confronted by their primary targets, the shipowners, as well as the unco-operative International Longshoremen's Association and law enforcement, which had taken "a decidedly anti-labor position". Houston Police had put former Texas lawman Frank Hamer on permanent payroll as strikebreaker. Hamer's installation of a ring of labor informants triggered complaints to the National Labor Relations Board.

In late November, the offices of the ISU moved to Houston's Cotton Exchange Building. The building became the scene of pickets and police arrests. Strikers were particularly interested in an ISU official, Wilbur Dickey, holed up there, and said to be sharing rank-and-file member information with police. On December 4, an attempt to flush out Dickey ended with him fatally shooting a striker, Johnny Kane, and Dickey and two companions were then beaten by a street mob before their rescue by police. Kane died on the 15th. The other known fatality was an Alaskan striker named Peter Banfield, a tanker seaman fatally stabbed in a fight in Galveston on December 9.

Two melees between strikers and Houston police on the 23rd and on Christmas Eve brought at least 18 strikers to hospitalization and brought disapproving public attention to the police. Many had seemed to be drunk. Ending the strike became a priority for incoming Mayor Richard Fonville By appointing a new police chief and eliminating all "special officers," Fonville set the conditions for the violence to subside. The strike ended by union vote in New York City on January 21, 1937.

== Results ==
The Gulf Coast strike was parallel to other US maritime strikes called at the same time. As wildcat strikes, they were not tightly co-ordinated. A West Coast "Fall Strike" began on October 29, lasted 96 days, and was led by Harry Lundeberg as president of the Maritime Federation of the Pacific.

The ISU's policy and behavior towards rank-and-file members became a major factor in the founding of the National Maritime Union in May 1937. By its first convention in July, some 30,000 workers had joined.

Reportedly, "From 1936 to 1938, 28 (National Maritime) union members were killed and more than 300 were injured in strikes" but not, as some sources suggest, only in the 1936 Gulf Coast strike.

== See also ==
- Strikes in the United States in the 1930s
- 2024 United States port strike
