= Red Lopez =

Murderer

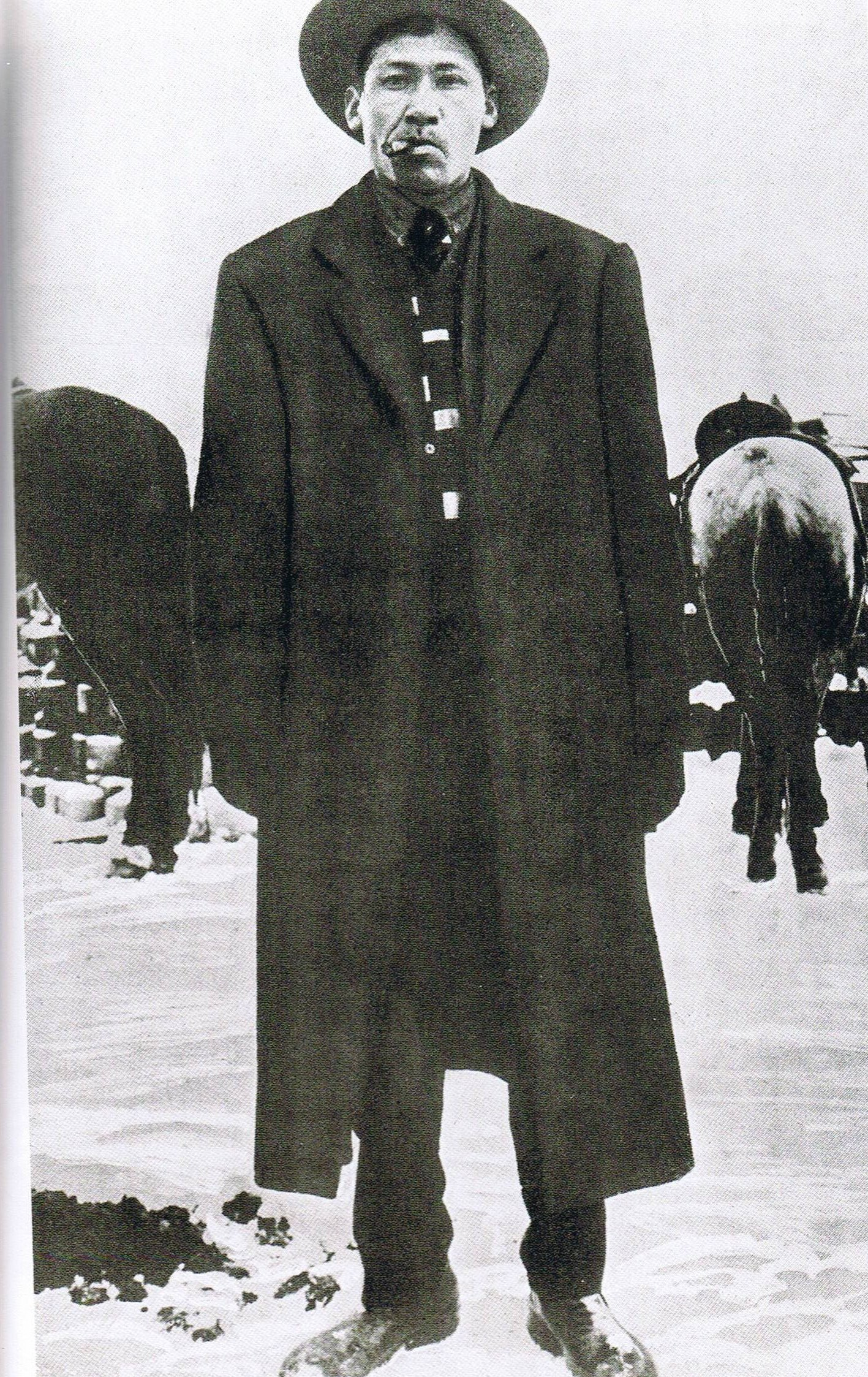
- Red Lopez in 1913
- Born: Rafael Lopez c.1886 Mexico
- Died: October 1921; Texas, United States
- Other name: Ralph Lopez
- Occupations: Outlaw, revolutionary

Red Lopez (c.1886 – October 1921), born Rafael Lopez, was a Mexican outlaw who was responsible for at least thirty known murders in northern Mexico and the American Southwest. He fought in the Mexican Revolution. He was eventually killed in a shootout by American Frank Hamer, a Texas Ranger.

== Biography ==
=== Early life ===
Rafael "Red" Lopez was born in northern Mexico about 1886. His mother was an Indian, and his father was Martin Lopez. His father later became a general in Pancho Villa's army. One of Lopez's uncles was Pablo Lopez, another Villista general. He is credited with the Santa Isabel Massacre in 1916.

Lopez and his younger brother were sent to New Mexico Territory to work in the mines with some of their relatives as a youth. In New Mexico, Lopez became a skilled equestrian and marksman. By 1913 Buffalo Bill Cody employed him in his Wild West show, which toured both nationally and internationally.

=== Utah ===
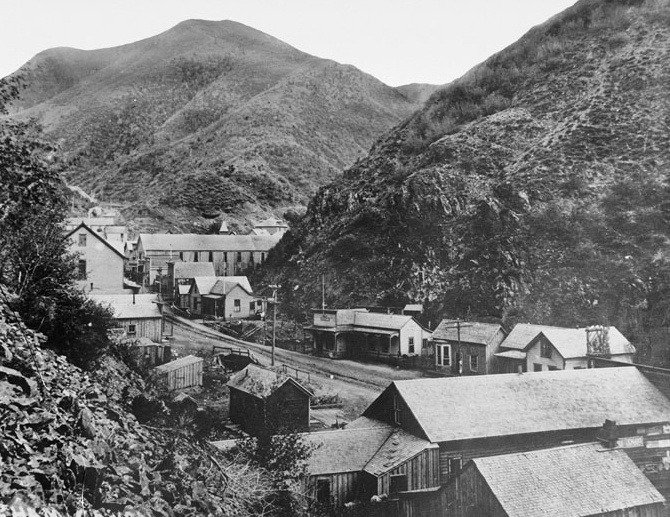
Bingham, Utah in 1914.

On November 21, 1913, Lopez shot and killed a fellow miner named Juan Valdez in Bingham, Utah. According to differing accounts, Lopez and Valdez had argued over a woman. Kerry Boren says that Lopez was exacting revenge for Valdez's alleged murder of the former's brother years before. Lopez had no intention of surrendering to the authorities and fled across snow-covered mountains on foot to a ranch located near Utah Lake and the present-day town of Saratoga Springs.

A four-man posse was soon on Lopez's trail, and they caught up with him at about 4:30 p.m. that same day. They rode their horses right into an ambush. As the posse was approaching the ranch house, Lopez opened fire on them from a nearby ditch with a Model 1895 .30-06 Winchester rifle. At a distance later determined by the Salt Lake Tribune to be 118 yards, Lopez struck the Bingham police chief, John William Grant, in the back and killed him instantly. Next Lopez hit Deputy Nephi Jensen in the pelvis and Deputy George Witbeck in the right side of his chest. Jensen died almost immediately, but Witbeck survived for about twenty minutes. Deputy Julius Sorenson was saved by a defective bullet. He was the only one of the four lawmen to return Lopez's fire, and the Mexican retreated from the field.

News of the shootout quickly spread. Lawmen from all over Utah assembled to participate in what would become the state's largest manhunt in history. The new posse consisted of a total of about 200 men, both civilians and lawmen.

Meanwhile, Lopez went to hide in the Minnie Silver Mine outside Bingham. He stopped at the home of a friend, Mike Stefano, and took his Model 1894 .30-30 Winchester rifle. A few days later, the police were informed of Lopez's whereabouts and they proceeded to block off the entrances to the mine with armed guards. On November 29, the posse tried to smoke Lopez out by sending two deputies in with an ore car full of hay to start a fire, but Lopez killed them both. The remaining possemen attempted to starve Lopez into submission, but he survived due to the efforts of sympathetic miners, who left food in the tunnels. The posse also tried pumping smoke and fumes into the place, but this did not work, either. Finally, Lopez escaped the mine into Bingham Canyon and got away. The posse called off the search on January 3, 1914, the day after finding the mine empty.

Lopez was never again seen in Utah, but his case remained open for ninety years. The shootout on November 21, 1913, was the deadliest in the history of Utah law enforcement.

=== Texas ===
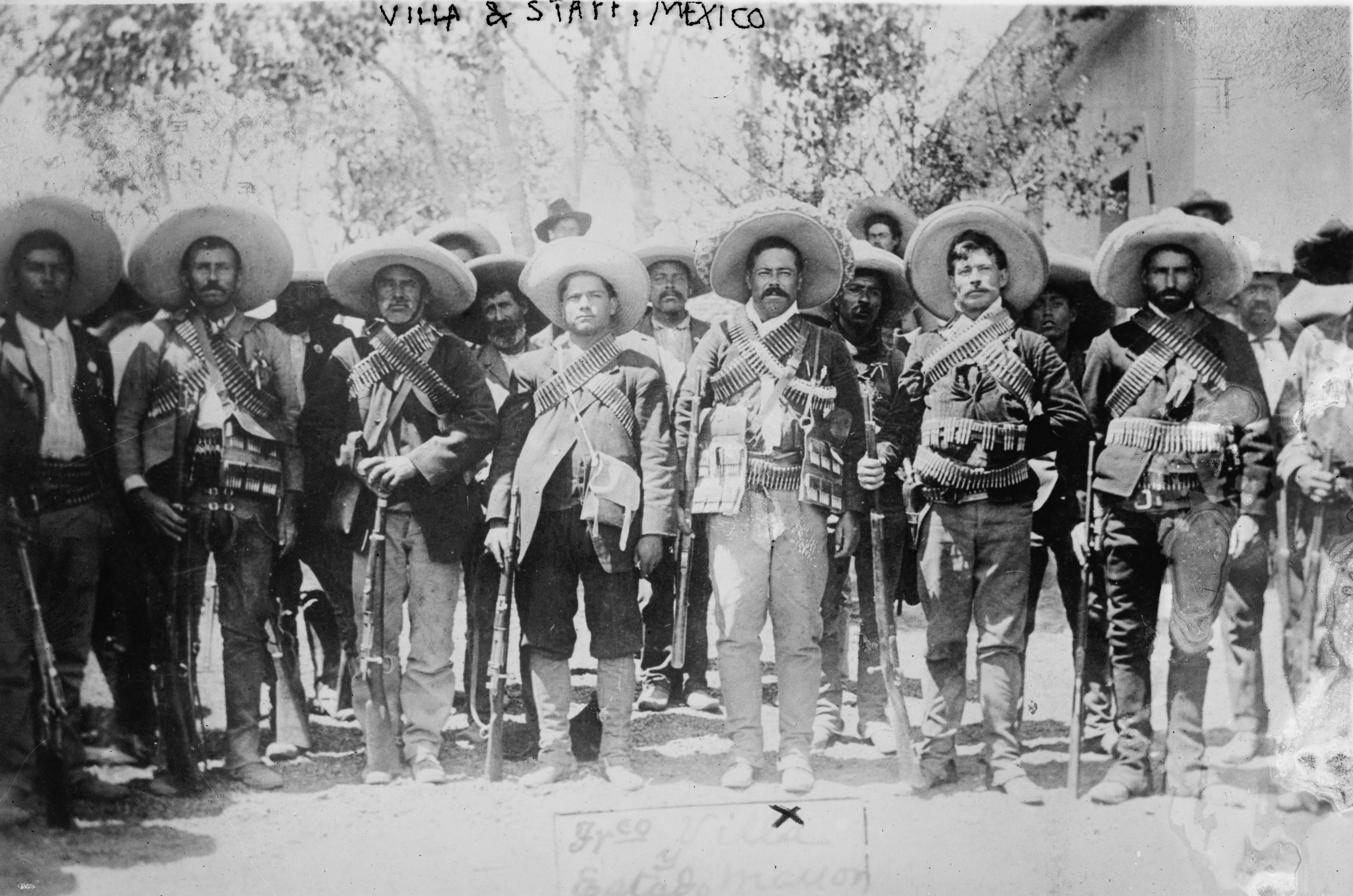
Generals Martin Lopez (far right) and Pablo Lopez (left of Villa) standing with Pancho Villa (center) and other Villista commanders in 1914.

Lopez fled to Texas, where he became the leader of an outlaw gang. According to Kerry Boren, many of Lopez's men were former members of Butch Cassidy's Wild Bunch. For the next several years, Lopez plundered banks and trains along the Rio Grande. Between 1915 and 1916 he fought in the Mexican Revolution with his father.

Somewhere near the international border, Lopez and his men in 1914 derailed a train, robbed it, and killed nineteen of the twenty American passengers on board. In response to the massacre, the Texas Rangers began pursuing Lopez, but they failed to catch up with him for years.

Kerry Boren says that Lopez died in 1916 during a battle between American and Villista forces. Other historians have concluded that he was killed by Frank Hamer in 1921.

In October 1921, Frank Hamer was in command of Company C, Texas Rangers, with which he had worked on and off for years. He was told by an informant that Lopez was expected to attend an upcoming meeting of outlaws near the Rio Grande. Hamer decided to ambush the meet with some of his men by having them take up positions in an irrigation ditch and fire on the outlaws as they rode across the river border. After they moved into place, Hamer suspected that the informant had led him into a trap, so he had his men hide the horses and reposition themselves on a low ridge thirty yards away, which overlooked the irrigation ditch.

As the sun began to set, the rangers spotted about twenty armed men approaching on foot to the rear of the ditch. Hamer later said that at this time, he could see both the informant and Lopez, who was wearing his "trademark clothing," a red bandana and overalls. Hamer stood up from his concealed position and shouted "Halt! We're officers of the law!" in Spanish. Instantly Lopez "whirled around'" and fired at Hamer with a rifle, grazing him on the cheek. Hamer opened fire with his .35 caliber Remington Model 8. His first bullet struck Lopez in the chest and he died instantly. Hamer aimed for the informant, but, before he could fire, one of the other rangers shot the man down. The fighting lasted about thirty minutes. Eleven bandits were killed that day while none of the rangers was hurt, except Hamer's graze. Hamer took a gold watch off Lopez's body; it was covered in blood and had been damaged by one of the lawman's bullets. Hamer gave the watch to his brother, Harrison, who hung it on a wall in the customs house in Laredo. The watch remained on display for several years afterward.

Although Lopez was dead and his gang defeated, the Texas Rangers never told the state of Utah. The Lopez case remained open until January 24, 2003. After years of investigating on his own time and money, Deputy Sheriff Randy Lish of Salt Lake County confirmed that the Lopez of Utah and the Lopez of Texas were the same man, and the case was closed.

== See also ==
- United States involvement in the Mexican Revolution
