= Frank Hamer =

American law enforcement officer (1884–1955)

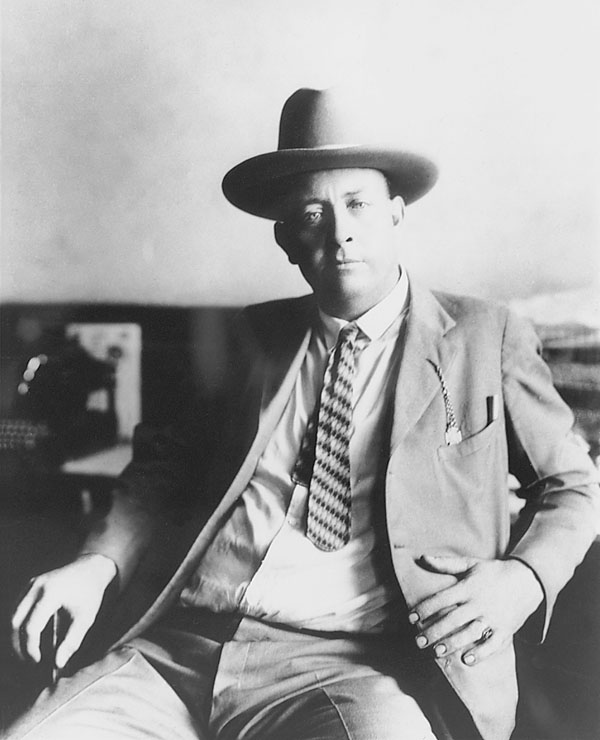
- Hamer in 1922
- Born: Francis Augustus Hamer; March 17, 1884; Wilson County, Texas, U.S.
- Died: July 10, 1955 (aged 71); Austin, Texas, U.S.
- Occupation: Law enforcement officer
- Employer: Texas Ranger Division
- Known for: Leader of posse that killed Bonnie Parker and Clyde Barrow

Francis Augustus Hamer (March 17, 1884 – July 10, 1955) was an American lawman and Texas Ranger who led the 1934 posse that tracked down and killed criminals Bonnie Parker and Clyde Barrow. Renowned for his toughness, marksmanship, and investigative skill, he acquired status in the Southwest as the archetypal Texas Ranger. He was inducted into the Texas Ranger Hall of Fame.

Hamer has been described by biographer John Boessenecker as "one of the greatest American lawmen of the twentieth century".

== Early years ==
Frank Hamer was born in 1884 in Fairview, Wilson County, Texas, where his father operated a blacksmith shop. Growing up in a devoutly Presbyterian family, he was one of five sons, four of whom became Texas Rangers. Hamer grew up on the Welch ranch in San Saba County, and later spent time in Oxford, Llano County, which is now a ghost town; he later joked about being the only "Oxford-educated Ranger". Although his formal education ended after the sixth grade, as a youth Hamer displayed several unusual abilities, including an extremely high level of intelligence and a near eidetic memory. He excelled at mathematics and developed a deep interest in history, particularly that of the Texas Rangers and the region's Native American tribes, such as the Comanche, Kiowa, and Kiowa Apache. Hamer worked in his father's shop as a youth, and as a wrangler on a local ranch.

Hamer began his career in law enforcement in 1905 while working on the Carr Ranch in West Texas, when he captured a horse thief. The local sheriff was so impressed that he recommended that Hamer join the Rangers, which he did the following year. He was at home on the open Texas prairie and understood the signs and patterns of nature. He interpreted men in terms of animal characteristics: "The criminal is a coyote, always taking a look over his shoulder."

=== Law enforcement career ===
Hamer was a Ranger off and on throughout his adult life, resigning often to take other jobs. He joined Captain John H. Rogers' Company C in Alpine, Texas, on April 21, 1906, and began patrolling the Mexican border. In 1908, he resigned from the Rangers to become the City Marshal of Navasota, Texas, a lawless boom-town wracked by violence; "shootouts on the main street were so frequent that in two years at least a hundred men died." Hamer moved in at age 24 and enforced law and order. In 1911, he moved to Houston to work as a special investigator for Mayor Horace Baldwin Rice, where he was seconded to the Sheriff's Office of Harris County. In 1914, he was hired as a deputy sheriff in Kimble County, assigned as the department's livestock theft investigator.

Hamer rejoined the Rangers in 1915 and was assigned to patrol the South Texas border around Brownsville during the Bandit War and La Matanza. The Rangers dealt with arms smugglers because of the constant unrest in Mexico during the Mexican Revolution. They also tried to control the bootleggers during the Prohibition era and bandits who plagued the border. He left the Rangers and was commissioned as a Special Ranger for the Texas and Southwestern Cattle Raisers Association.

In 1917, Hamer married Gladys (Johnson) Sims, the widow of Ed Sims of Snyder, Texas; she and her brother, Sidney Arthur Johnson, had been charged in 1916 with murdering Sims. Hamer and Gladys and other family members were stopped at a garage on October 1, 1917 to get gasoline in Sweetwater when they suddenly encountered Gus McMeans of Odessa, Ed Sims' brother-in-law, and the Hamers and McMeans got into a pistol battle. McMeans was a former Texas Ranger and sheriff of Ector County, and he and Hamer "were clinched"; McMeans died of a shot to the heart and Hamer was wounded. Ten shots were fired in the gunfight, and police collected a total of seven revolvers, two semi-automatic pistols, and three rifles from the two parties.

Following this, Hamer left the Cattlemen's Association to accept a position as a federal agent in the Prohibition Unit, where he served for about one year. His service was brief but eventful while stationed in El Paso, the scene of countless gunfights during the Prohibition era. He participated in numerous raids and shootouts, and he was involved in a gun battle with smugglers on March 21 which resulted in the death of Prohibition Agent Ernest W. Walker. Hamer transferred to Austin in 1921 where he served as Senior Ranger Captain.

In 1918, Hamer physically threatened State Representative José Tomás Canales, who was leading an investigation into Texas Rangers accused of abusing residents of the Rio Grande Valley. Canales reported the threat to the governor, but Hamer was not disciplined. According to a 2019 Washington Post movie review by activist Monica Muñoz Martinez, Hamer supposedly stalked Canales in the capital and Samuel Ealy Johnson Jr., father of future President Lyndon B. Johnson, was among those who escorted Canales to the early 1919 hearings.

Beginning in 1922 Hamer led the fight in Texas against the Ku Klux Klan as senior captain of the Texas Rangers, which was still growing in Texas, and he saved 15 people from lynch mobs throughout his career. A less successful incident happened during the Sherman Riot of 1930, however. Hamer and a handful of Rangers were charged with protecting the trial of a black rape suspect, George Hughes, in the town of Sherman. A large mob approached the courthouse, and Hamer personally shot and wounded two of the mob's members. However, the mob set fire to the courthouse. Hamer and the Rangers escaped the building, but could not reach Hughes, who had been locked in the vault for his safety. They got into a borrowed car and drove away from Sherman, later regrouping at the sheriff's office. If Hughes had survived the fire, he did not survive the mob afterward, who used dynamite on the vault he'd been locked in and strung Hughes's dead body up. Sherman's black district was looted by the mob afterward, with the Rangers unwilling or unable to stop them.

In 1928, Hamer put a halt to a murder for hire ring, and his extraordinary means of accomplishing this made him nationally famous. The Texas Bankers' Association had begun offering rewards of $5,000 "for dead bank robbers—not one cent for live ones." Hamer determined that men were setting up deadbeats and two-bit outlaws to be killed by complicit police officers; the officers would collect the rewards and pay the men their finder's fees. But the police refused him support and the Bankers' Association's position was that "any man that could be induced to participate in a bank robbery ought to be killed." Hamer wrote a detailed exposé of the racket, which he termed "the bankers' murder machine", and he took his article to the press room of the State Capitol and handed out copies. His revelation about the racket resulted in public outrage, an investigation, and indictments. The bankers did not modify the terms of the reward, however, and more bounty murders took place in 1930.

Hamer retired in 1932 after almost 27 years with the Rangers. He left one week before Miriam "Ma" Ferguson recaptured the governor's office for a second term. She had first been elected after her husband "Pa" Ferguson had been impeached and forced to resign as governor, and at least 40 Rangers resigned rather than serve again under her. A year later, Hamer gave his reason for retiring: "When they elected a woman governor, I quit." The commander of the Texas Rangers allowed him to retain a Special Ranger commission as an active Senior Ranger Captain even after his official retirement. The special commission is listed in the state archives in Austin.

=== Bonnie Parker and Clyde Barrow ===
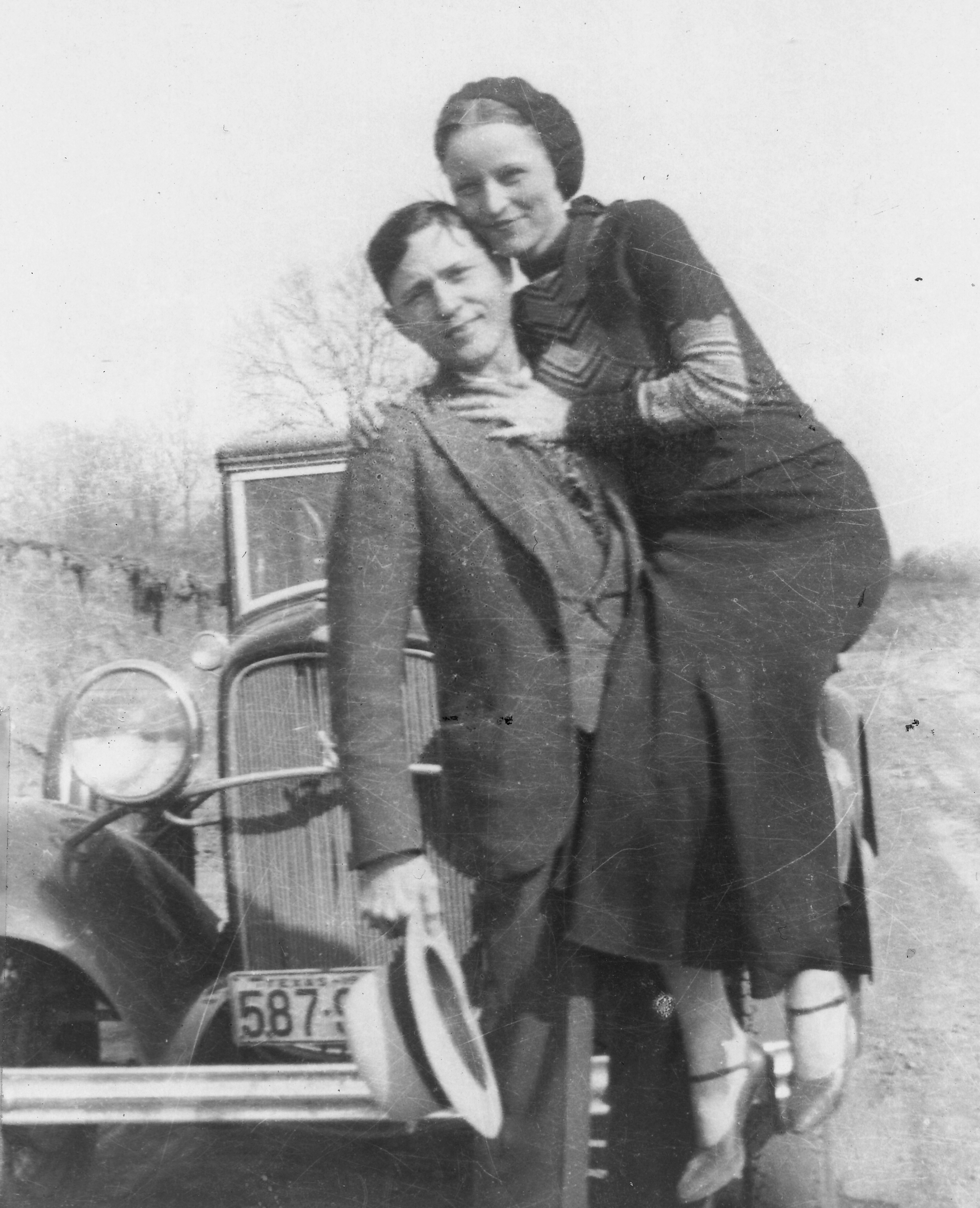
Bonnie Parker and Clyde Barrow, known as "Bonnie and Clyde" in 1933

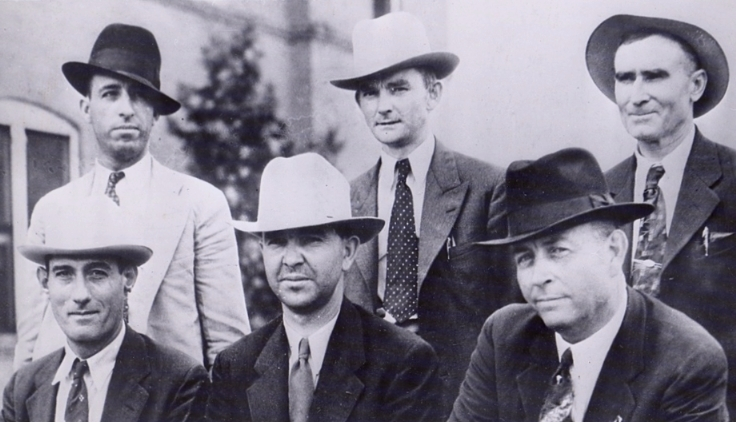
The posse. Top, L to R: Hinton, Oakley, Gault; seated, L to R: Alcorn, Jordan and Frank Hamer.

In the early 1930s, Clyde Barrow and Bonnie Parker's crime spree generated vast media coverage which embarrassed law enforcement and government officials in a half dozen states. On January 16, 1934, Barrow, Parker, and associate Jimmy Mullens raided Eastham prison farm, freeing Raymond Hamilton, Henry Methvin, Hilton Bybee, and Joe Palmer. Hamilton's brother Floyd wrote that Henry Methvin was not part of the original "invited" group but fled with them during the general confusion. Barrow had particularly wanted to free Ralph Fults and Aubrey Skelley, but he considered the raid to be successful retaliation against the prison system. Historian John Neal Phillips says that "paying back" the Department of Corrections for abuse that Barrow had received while imprisoned motivated many of his actions and underlay his crime spree. The Texas Department of Corrections received national negative publicity over the jailbreak, which delighted Barrow, who thought that he finally had his revenge.

Two guards were shot by the escapees during the breakout, guard Major Crowson fatally. He died in the hospital on January 27 soon after Texas prison administrator Lee Simmons assured him that he would send his killer Joe Palmer to the electric chair. Simmons then turned his attention to restoring the reputation of the Texas prison system.

==== Hamer leads the hunt ====
Simmons persuaded Hamer to hunt down the Barrow Gang. Hamer was commissioned as an officer of the Texas Highway Patrol, then seconded to the prison system as a special investigator charged with apprehending Barrow and his colleagues. (Note: Simmons, chief of the Dept. of Corrections, wrote in his memoir that Hamer was one of two lawmen whom he had in mind. According to Ranger historian Ben Proctor, two former Ranger captains later said that Simmons had approached each of them first, and that they each turned him down for the identical reason: "We don't ambush people, and we don't kill women." Guinn p. 410. Ralph Fults heard the story from one of the Rangers in 1948. Phillips, p. 354 n. 3.) Hamer balked at the compensation of $180 a month, less than half his current pay, but Simmons reiterated that Hamer would collect his fair share of the reward money. He further added to the deal by authorizing Hamer to take whatever he wanted from among the Barrow Gang's possessions when he caught them. Simmons said that he wouldn't presume to tell Hamer how to do his job, but he suggested that Hamer "put 'em on the spot, know you're right—and shoot everybody in sight."

Hamer examined the pattern of Barrow's movements, discovering that he essentially made a wide circle through the lower Midwest, skirting state borders wherever he could to take advantage of the fact that law officers could not pursue suspects across state lines. The circle's anchor points were Dallas, Joplin, Missouri, and northwest Louisiana, with wider arcs outward for bank robberies. Hamer felt that he learned Barrow's statistics, but "this was not enough. An officer must know the habits of the outlaw, how he thinks and how he will act in different situations. When I began to understand Clyde Barrow's mind, I felt that I was making progress."

In the next couple of months, Barrow, Parker, and Henry Methvin robbed banks in Lancaster, Texas, Poteau, Oklahoma, and the Iowa towns of Rembrandt, Knierim, Stuart, and Everly. Hamer was always following close behind.

==== Shootings propel public outrage ====
Hamer was tracking the Barrow gang's murders as well as the bank robberies. The gang had killed two Texas Highway Patrol officers at Grapevine, Texas on Easter Sunday, April 1, 1934 which inflamed public sentiment against Barrow and Parker. An eyewitness account gained widespread newspaper coverage, stating that a drunken Bonnie had emptied her gun into the prone body of Patrolman Murphy at Grapevine, laughing as she fired at the way that his "head bounced like a rubber ball" on the road. Another story stated that a cigar butt "bearing tiny teethmarks" was found in the gravel. The lurid newspaper stories and the furor which they created increased the pressure on government and law enforcement to capture the criminals, and Governor Ferguson placed a $500 bounty on Bonnie for her alleged role in the murder of Patrolman Murphy.

Five days later, popular opinion turned against the criminals even more when Barrow and Methvin killed Constable Calvin Campbell, a 60-year-old single father, near Commerce, Oklahoma. They kidnapped Commerce Chief of Police Percy Boyd and drove him across the border into Kansas, where they released him. He posted their names at the top of the Campbell murder warrants, issued against Barrow, Parker, and John Doe (Methvin) later that week.

==== Focus shifts to Louisiana ====
In mid-March, Henry Methvin's family contacted Bienville Parish Sheriff Henderson Jordan about their son, his legal troubles, and his involvement with Barrow. Hamer was a lone wolf by nature, but he eventually formed an inter-jurisdictional posse and created a plan to ambush the gang. Sheriff Jordan and his deputy Prentiss Oakley, an excellent marksman, were the first to join the posse. Hamer brought in fellow former Ranger Maney Gault who had resigned from the Ranger force when "Ma" Ferguson was elected and now worked for the Texas Highway Patrol. Hamer asked Dallas County Sheriff Smoot Schmid to assign his deputy Bob Alcorn full-time to the case; Schmid sent Alcorn and Ted Hinton, another Dallas County deputy. (Note: Hinton remembered Bonnie from the Dallas café where she had waited tables four years before. Alcorn had picked up 16 year-old Clyde in West Dallas for stealing chickens, though he did not arrest him.) The two deputies and Schmid had tried to ambush Bonnie and Clyde in late November 1933 near Sowers, Texas. They examined Barrow's abandoned V-8 Ford at Sowers and discovered that the bullets from Hinton's Thompson submachine gun had not penetrated its body, so this time Hinton requested a Browning automatic rifle.

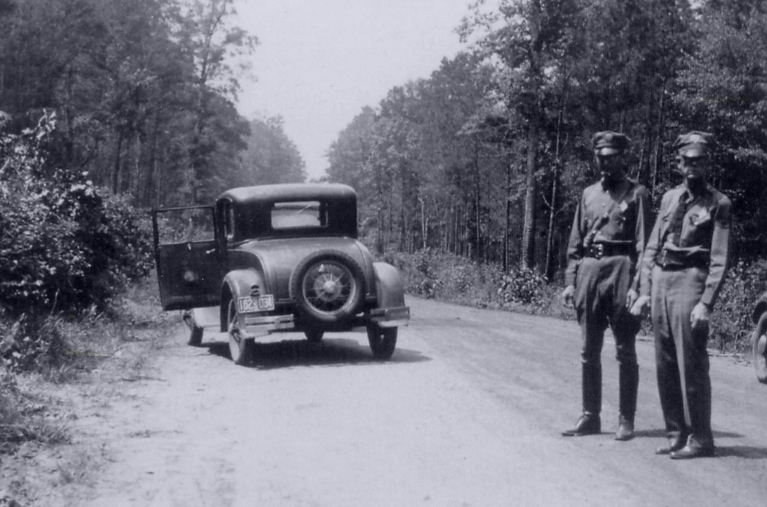
The road ended here for Bonnie and Clyde.

The lawmen confronted Bonnie and Clyde on a rural road near Gibsland, Louisiana at 9:15 a.m. on May 23, 1934, after 102 days tracking them. Barrow stopped his car at the ambush spot and the posse's 150-round fusillade was so thunderous that people for miles around thought a logging crew had used dynamite to fell a huge tree. (Note: Dynamiting trees was illegal and logging crews were angered at the sound, thinking that someone was violating the ban.) Accounts differ only slightly concerning the last moment before gunfire erupted: Sheriff Jordan said that he was calling out to Barrow to halt as the shooting started, Deputy Alcorn said that Captain Hamer was calling out, and Deputy Hinton wrote that Alcorn called out. All six, however, agreed that Deputy Oakley stood and fired the opening shot from his Remington Model 8, and that his bullet hit Barrow's left temple and killed the outlaw instantly. (Note: Guinn bases his description of the ambush on Sandy Jones's exhaustive 1998 inquiry and forensic reenactment.) The posse fired off another 100-plus rounds, any number of which would have been fatal to Parker and also to Barrow.

Hamer used a customized .35 Remington Model 8 semiautomatic rifle with a 15-round magazine that he ordered from Pet McKay's Sporting Goods store in Austin, Texas. He was shipped serial number 10045; at least two Model 8s were used in the ambush. The rifle was modified to accept a "police only" 20-round magazine obtained through the Peace Officers Equipment Company in St. Joseph, Missouri.

State, local, and other sources had pledged money to the Barrow reward fund which brought the pre-ambush total to some $26,000, but most reneged on their pledges. Each posse member received a meager $200.23. They were allowed to take some of the goods and belongings of the gang; Hamer took most of the guns.

Hamer had learned a great deal about the lives of Barrow and Parker in the preceding months, and he told reporters that, under other circumstances, he "would have gotten sick" to see a woman's perforated body in the car; as it was, he did not get sick because he remembered Parker's crimes. "I hated to shoot a woman—but I remembered the way in which Bonnie had taken part in the murder of nine peace officers. I remembered how she kicked the body of the highway patrolman at Grapevine and fired a bullet into his body as he lay on the ground." Hamer also said that he hated "to bust the cap on a woman, especially when she was sitting down, however if it wouldn't have been her, it would have been us."

== Later years ==
During the 1930s, Hamer applied his civil peace-keeping skills to working on behalf of various oil companies and shippers, which were resisting unionization of their companies, and he was often employed as a strike breaker. The first of these engagements was for the city of Houston during the 1935 Gulf Coast longshoremen's strike. Hamer headed a force of 20 ex-Rangers and sheriffs to prevent sabotage and looting. He was also active the following year during the 1936 Gulf Coast maritime workers' strike. In their 1968 biography of Hamer titled I'm Frank Hamer: The Life of a Texas Peace Officer, H. Gordon Frost and John Holmes Jenkins claimed that in 1939 Hamer wrote to George VI following the outbreak of World War II and offered the services of 49 retired Texas Rangers to "address the Nazi threat". Frost and Jenkins further claimed that the Roosevelt administration stymied the offer in accordance with the United States' neutrality; Darren L. Ivey noted in 2021 that Hamer's alleged offer is "not supported by independent evidence."

In September 1948, Hamer was called back to Ranger duty to play a small role in the notorious 1948 United States Senate election in Texas. Former Governor Coke Stevenson hired him to accompany him to the Texas State Bank in Alice to examine the tally sheets for ballot box 13, which held ballots for his opponent, Representative Lyndon B. Johnson, which he knew to be fraudulent. Outside the bank stood two glowering groups of armed men. Hamer got out of the car, approached the first group, and said "git" and they left. The second group was blocking the doors of the bank, and he said "fall back" and they complied. Hamer retired in 1949 and lived in Austin until his death.

== Health and death ==
In 1953, Frank Hamer suffered a heat stroke; he lived two more years but never regained his health. He was buried near his son Billy, who was killed in action during WWII at Iwo Jima in 1945, in Memorial Park Cemetery in Austin. He was wounded 17 times during his life and left for dead four times. He is credited with having killed between 53 and 70 people.

== Popular culture ==
In the 1967 film Bonnie and Clyde, Hamer is portrayed by Denver Pyle. He is depicted as incompetent, while the Barrow gang is shown capturing, teasing, and humiliating him. The ambush at the end of the film is suggested as his personal revenge. After the film's release, his widow Gladys and son Frank Jr. sued Warner Bros.-Seven Arts for defamation of character. In 1971, they received an undisclosed out-of-court settlement.

Kevin Costner portrays Hamer in the 2019 Netflix original film The Highwaymen, which was released to theaters for a short run and began streaming in March 2019. Woody Harrelson plays Maney Gault.

Ken Farmer portrays Hamer in the 1998 film The Newton Boys.

Chris Mulkey portrays Hamer in a 2016 episode of Timeless.

== See also ==
- Red Lopez – outlaw pursued by Hamer

== Bibliography ==
- Boessenecker, John (2016). Texas Ranger – The Epic Life of Frank Hamer, the Man Who Killed Bonnie and Clyde. New York: St. Martin's Press. ISBN 978-1-250-06998-6.
- Burrough, Bryan (2004). Public Enemies. New York: The Penguin Press. ISBN 1-59420-021-1.
- Caro, Robert A. (1982). The Years of Lyndon Johnson: Means of Ascent. New York: Knopf. ISBN 0-394-49973-5.
- Cox, Mike (2009). Time of the Rangers. New York: Tom Doherty Associates. ISBN 0-7653-1815-6.
- Dallek, Robert (1991). Lone Star Rising: Lyndon Johnson and His Times, 1908–1960. New York: Oxford University Press. ISBN 0-19-505435-0.
- Dolan, Samuel K (2016). Cowboys and Gangsters: Stories of an Untamed Southwest. TwoDot Books. ISBN 978-1-4422-4669-0
- Guinn, Jeff (2009). Go Down Together: The True, Untold Story of Bonnie and Clyde. New York: Simon and Schuster. ISBN 1-4165-5706-7
- Harris, Charles H., and Louis R. Sadler (2007). The Texas Rangers and the Mexican Revolution: The Bloodiest Decade, 1910–1920. Albuquerque: University of New Mexico Press. ISBN 0-8263-3483-0.
- Herring, Hal (2008). Famous Firearms of the Old West: From Wild Bill Hickok's Colt Revolvers to Geronimo's Winchester, Twelve Guns That Shaped Our History. TwoDot. ISBN 978-0-7627-4508-1.
- Hinton, Ted (1979). Ambush: The Real Story of Bonnie and Clyde. Austin: Shoal Creek Publishers, Inc. ISBN 978-0-88319-041-8.
- Knight, James R., with Jonathan Davis (2003). Bonnie and Clyde: A 21st Century Update. Austin, Texas: Eakin Press. ISBN 1-57168-794-7.
- Milner, E.R. (2003). The Lives and Times of Bonnie and Clyde. Carbondale: Southern Illinois University Press. ISBN 0-8093-2552-7.
- Olson, James Stuart (1999). Historical Dictionary of the 1960s. Westport, CT: Greenwood Press. ISBN 0-313-29271-X.
- Parker, Emma Krause, Nell Barrow Cowan and Jan I. Fortune (1968). The True Story of Bonnie and Clyde. New York: New American Library. ISBN 0-8488-2154-8. Originally published 1934 as Fugitives.
- Phillips, John Neal (1996). Running with Bonnie & Clyde: The Ten Fast Years of Ralph Fults. Norman and London: University of Oklahoma Press. ISBN 0-8061-3429-1.
- Plantinga, Cornelius (1995). Not the Way It's Supposed to Be: A Breviary of Sin. Grand Rapids, MI: Wm. B. Eerdmans Publishing Co. ISBN 0-8028-4218-6.
- Ramsey, Winston G., ed. (2003). On The Trail of Bonnie and Clyde. London: After The Battle Books. ISBN 1-870067-51-7.
- Simmons, Lee (1957). Assignment: Huntsville. Austin: University of Texas Press. ISBN 1-881515-50-8
- Sitton, Thad (2000). The Texas Sheriff: Lord of the County Line. Norman and London: University of Oklahoma Press. ISBN 0-8061-3216-7.
- Toland, John (1995). The Dillinger Days. New York: Da Capo Press. ISBN 0-306-80626-6.
- Treherne, John (2000). The Strange History of Bonnie & Clyde. Cooper Square Press. ISBN 0-8154-1106-5.
- Webb, Walter Prescott (1935). The Texas Rangers: A Century of Frontier Defense. Austin: University of Texas Press. ISBN 0-292-78110-5.
