= Joseph Curran =

American sailor and labor leader (1906–1981)

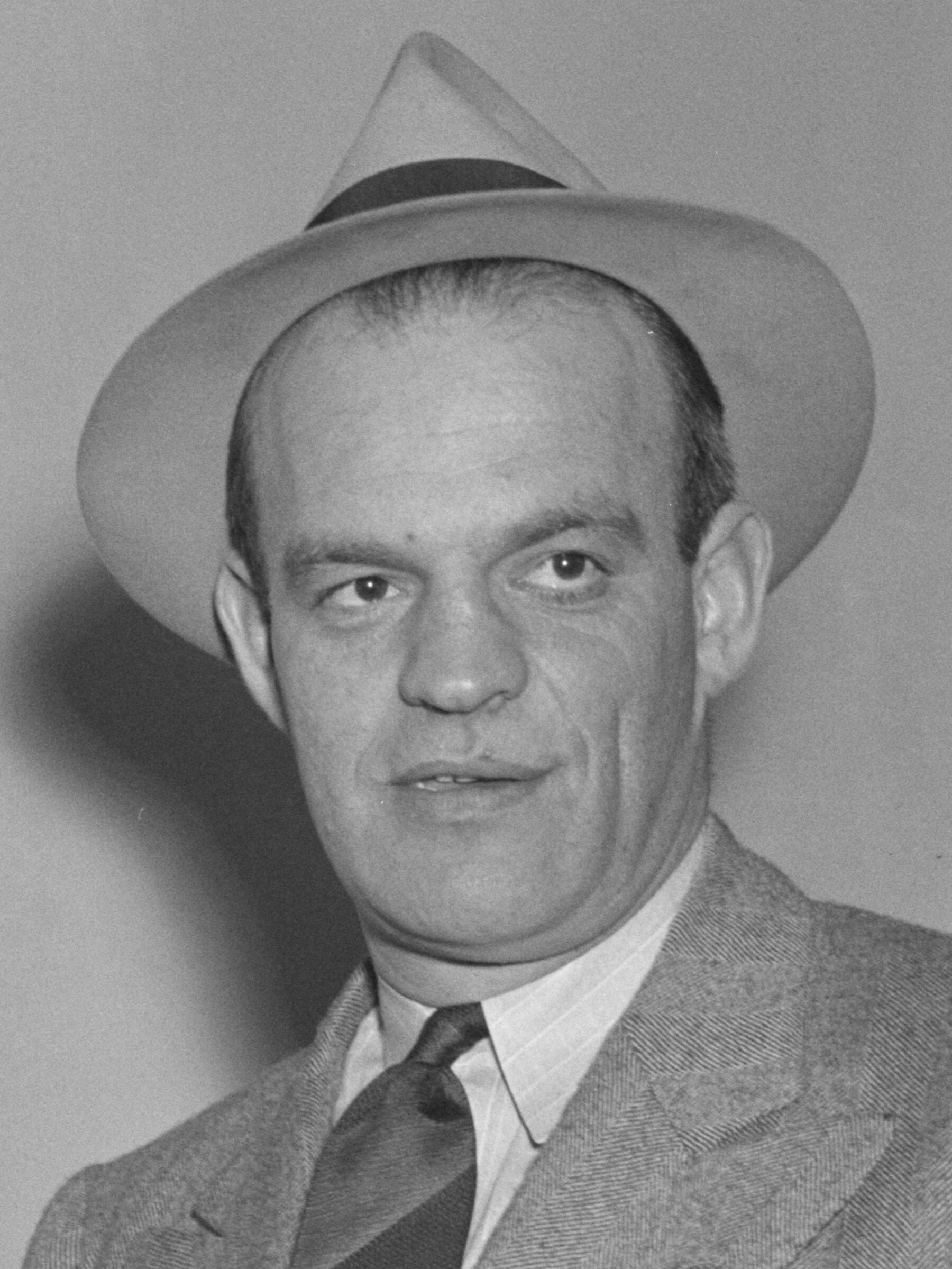
- Curran in 1937

President of the National Maritime Union
- In office May 1937 – March 5, 1973
- Preceded by: Office established
- Succeeded by: Shannon J. Wall

Personal details
- Born: March 1, 1906 New York City, New York, U.S.
- Died: August 14, 1981 (aged 75) Boca Raton, Florida, U.S.
- Spouse(s): Retta Curran (m. 1939; died 1963) Florence Curran (m. 1965)
- Children: Joseph Jr.
- Occupation: Trade union leader
- Website: www.seafarers.org

Joseph Curran (March 1, 1906 – August 14, 1981) was a merchant seaman and an American labor leader. He was founding president of the National Maritime Union (or NMU, now part of the Seafarers International Union of North America) from 1937 to 1973, and a vice president of the Congress of Industrial Organizations (CIO).

== Early life ==
Curran was born on Manhattan's Lower East Side. His father died when he was two years old, and his mother boarded with another family. He attended parochial school, but when he was 14 he was expelled during the seventh grade for truancy.

He worked as a caddie and factory worker before finding employment in 1922 in the United States Merchant Marine. He worked as an able seaman and boatswain, washing dishes in restaurants when not at sea and sleeping on a Battery Park bench at night. It was during this time that he received his lifelong nickname "Big Joe."

Curran joined the International Seamen's Union (or ISU; the remnants of which would become the Seafarers International Union), but was not active in the union at first.

== SS California strike ==
In 1936, Curran led a strike aboard the ocean liner S.S. California, then docked in San Pedro, California. Curran and the crew of the Panama Pacific Line's California went on strike at sailing time and refused to cast off the lines unless wages were increased and overtime paid.

The strike was essentially a sitdown strike. Curran and the crew refused to leave the ship, for the owners would have simply replaced them with strikebreakers. The crew remained aboard and continued to do all their duties except cast off the lines. The California remained tied up for three days.

Finally, United States Secretary of Labor Frances Perkins personally intervened in the California strike. Speaking to the crew by telephone, Perkins agreed to arrange a grievance hearing once the ship docked at its destination in New York City, and that there would be no reprisals by the company or government against Curran or the strikers.

During the California's return trip, the Panama Pacific Line raised wages by $5 a month to $60 per month.

But Perkins was unable to follow through on her other promises. United States Secretary of Commerce Daniel Roper and the Panama Pacific Line declared Curran and the strikers mutineers. The line took out national advertising attacking Curran. When the ship docked, Federal Bureau of Investigation agents met the ship and began an investigation into the "mutiny". Curran and other top strike leaders were fined two days' pay, fired and blacklisted. Perkins was able to keep the strikers from being prosecuted for mutiny, however.

Seaman all along the East Coast struck to protest the treatment of the California's crew. Curran became a leader of the 10-week strike, eventually forming a supportive association known as the Seamen's Defense Committee.

== Formation of NMU ==
The S.S. California strike was only part of a worldwide wave of unrest among American seamen. A series of port and shipboard strikes broke out in 1936 and 1937 in the Atlantic and Gulf of Mexico. In October 1936, Curran called the 1936 Gulf Coast maritime workers' strike, in part to improve working conditions and in part to embarrass the International Seamen's Union (ISU). The four-month strike idled 50,000 seamen and 300 ships.

Curran, believing it was time to abandon the conservative ISU, began to sign up members for a new, rival union. The level of organizing was so intense that hundreds of ships delayed their sailing time as seamen listened to organizers and signed union cards.

In May 1937, Curran and other leaders of his nascent movement formed the National Maritime Union (NMU). The Seamen's Defense Committee reconstituted itself as a union. It held its first convention in July, and 30,000 seamen switched their membership from the ISU to the NMU. Curran was elected president of the new organization. Elected secretary-treasurer of the union was Jamaican-born Ferdinand Smith. Thus, from its inception NMU was racially integrated. Within six years, nearly all racial discrimination was eliminated in hiring, wages, living accommodations and work assignments.

A hallmark of the new union was the formation of hiring halls in each port. The hiring halls ensured a steady supply of experienced seamen for passenger and cargo ships, and reduced the corruption which plagued the hiring of able seamen. The hiring halls also worked to combat racial discrimination and promote racial harmony among maritime workers.

Within a year, the NMU had more than 50,000 members, and most American shippers were under contract. Stripped of most of its membership, the ISU became almost moribund.

In July 1937, Curran and other seamen's union leaders were invited by John L. Lewis to come to Washington, D.C., to form a major organizing drive among ship and port workers. The unions comprised by CIO had been ejected by the American Federation of Labor (AFL) in November 1936, and now Lewis wanted to launch a maritime union. His goal was to create, out of the 300,000 maritime industry's workers, a union as large and influential as the Steel Workers Organizing Committee. Although Lewis favored Harry Bridges, president of the Pacific Coast District of the International Longshoremen's Association, to lead the new maritime industrial union, the other union leaders balked. Curran agreed to affiliate with the CIO, but refused to let Bridges or anyone else take over his union. His views were reflected among those of the other union leaders, and the CIO's maritime industrial union never got off the ground.

== Presidency ==
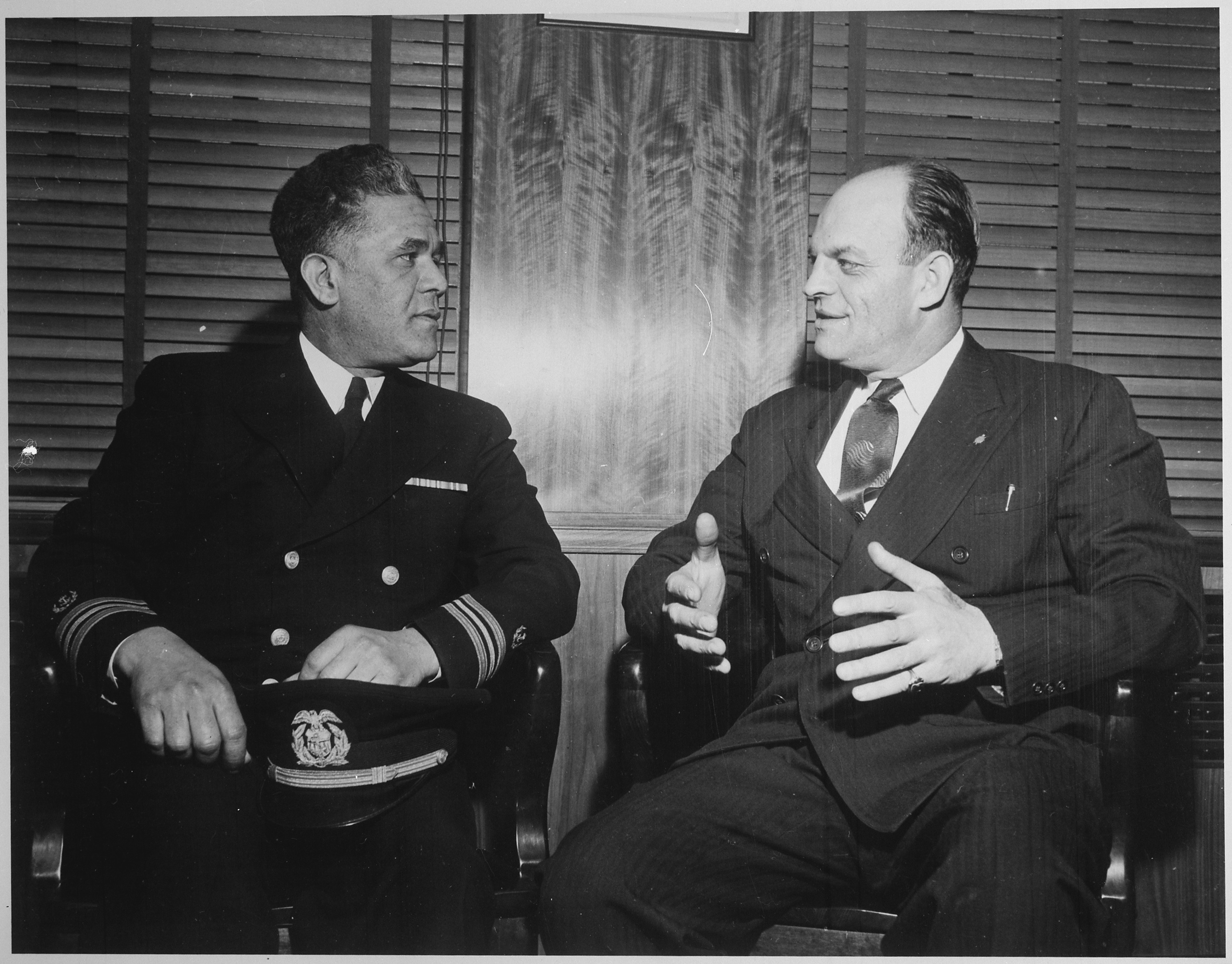
Curran (right), President of the National Maritime Union, chats with Capt. Clifton Lastic of the Liberty ship SS Bert Williams

During the next 36 years, Joseph Curran worked to make American merchant seamen the best-paid maritime workers in the world. NMU established a 40-hour work week, overtime, paid vacations, pension and health benefits, tuition reimbursement, and standards for shipboard food and living quarters. Curran even built a union-run school to retrain union members, and won large employer donations through collective bargaining to build the school.

Curran was a vociferous advocate of maritime workers' rights. When Joseph P. Kennedy advocated legislation to outlaw maritime strikes and make arbitration of labor disputes compulsory, Curran called him a "union wrecker". When Kennedy was under consideration as executive director of the United Seamen's Service (an association which assists, feeds and houses American merchant seamen overseas), Curran successfully opposed the multi-millionaire's candidacy. Curran put such pressure on Kennedy that on February 18, 1938, Kennedy resigned as chair of the United States Maritime Commission.

Curran was also a strong supporter of far-left-wing causes. In August 1940, he urged unions in the New York City area to support an "emergency peace mobilization" opposing U.S. entry into the war in Europe.

In 1940, Curran was elected a vice president of the CIO. When the CIO and AFL merged in 1955, he was appointed a vice president of the merged organization as well.

=== Greater New York Industrial Union ===
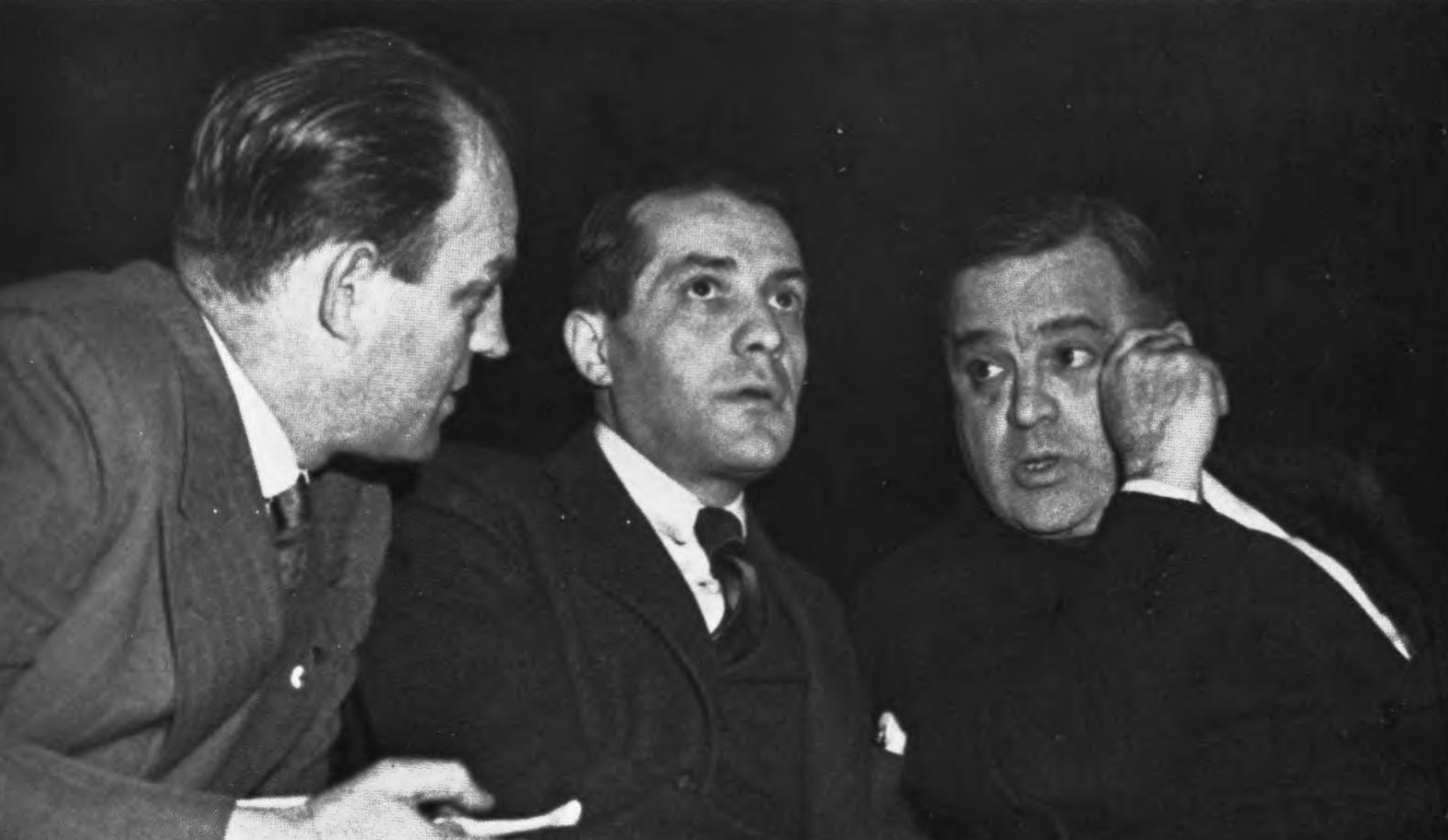
Curran (left) with Congressman Vito Marcantonio (center) and New York City Mayor Fiorello La Guardia at a labor rally

Curran was also elected president of the Greater New York Industrial Union.

The Greater New York Industrial Union (GNYIU) was organized by the CIO in 1940 as a central labor body for New York City. CIO-affiliated local unions in New York City and the nearby vicinity were its primary members. At the organization's founding convention on July 24, 1940, Curran was elected president of GNYIU. Saul Kills, a member of the American Newspaper Guild, was elected its secretary-treasurer. The organization had 250 local union affiliates, representing more than 500,000 workers.

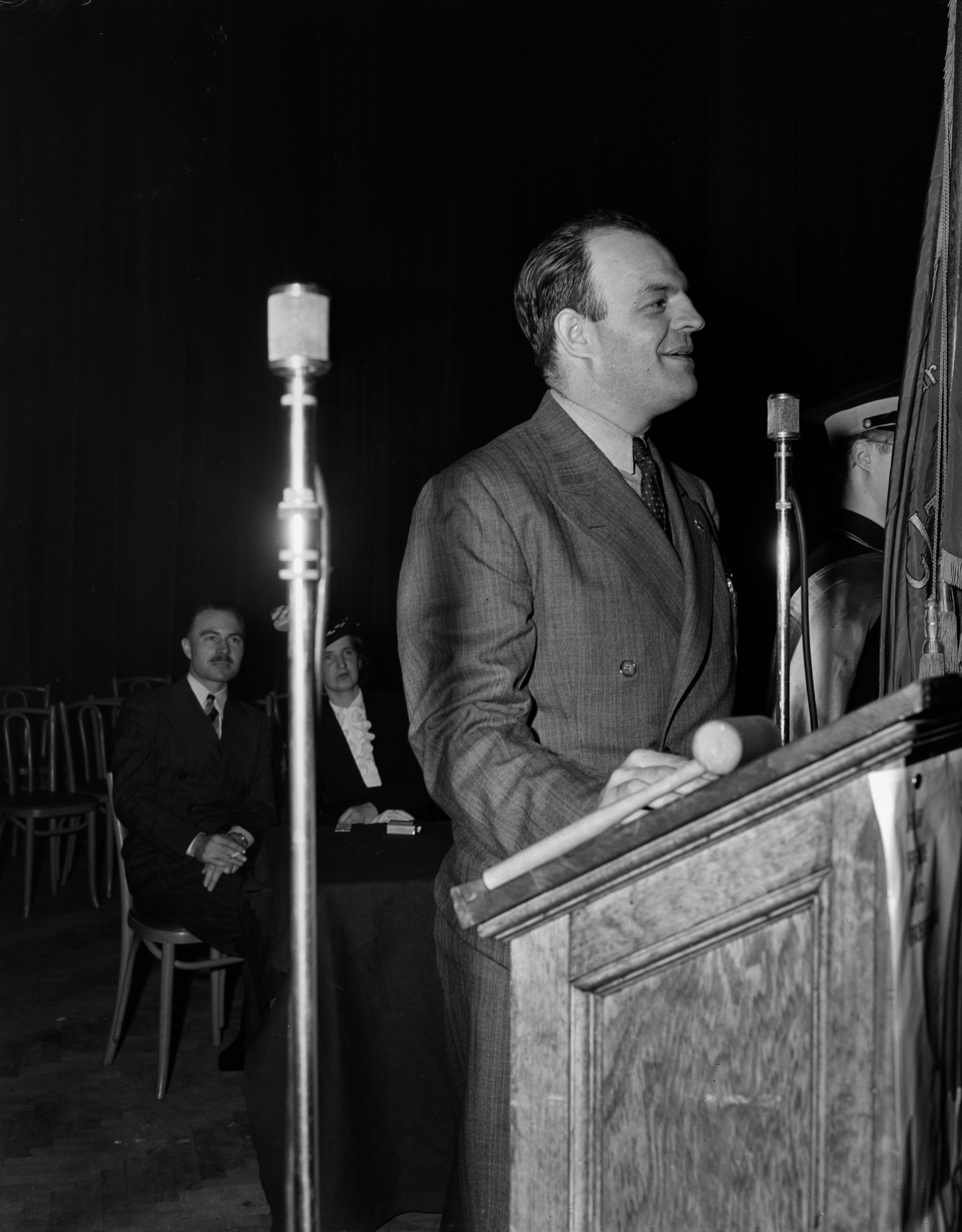
Curran speaks at an anti-Dies Committee rally at Manhattan Center, April 24, 1940

By 1948, however, there were serious concerns about communist infiltration of the GNYIU. The United States House of Representatives appointed a special investigative subcommittee to look into the matter. Several CIO unions were investigated, including the United Electrical, Radio and Machine Workers of America, the Teachers Union of the City of New York, the United Public Workers of America and the Department Store Employees Union.

CIO president Philip Murray appointed a three-member board in October 1940 to forestall the House investigation. The board members reported to Murray that Curran, Kills and the GNYIU executive board had been advocating pro-communist policies. The GNYIU was on the verge of supporting Henry A. Wallace in an independent bid for president as well. The national CIO executive board revoked the charter of the GNYIU in November 1940. Curran denied that he was a communist before both the CIO executive board and the Joint Commerce Committee of the U.S. Congress. Curran became increasingly anti-communist thereafter. In 1946, he pulled the NMU out of a Committee for Maritime Unity which was led by Harry Bridges. After World War II, he purged thousands of members and elected leaders he suspected of harboring communist sympathies.

In 1960, Curran, along with several other union leaders, visited the Soviet Union as "guests of the USSR Sea and River Workers Union," visiting various ports and Khrushchev in the Kremlin, according to the October, 1960, edition of the journal "USSR."

== Other roles ==
Curran served on a number of other committees, boards and positions with other organizations.

For many years, he was chair of the AFL-CIO's Maritime Committee. He was also co-chair of the Labor-Management Maritime Committee, a body established by AFL-CIO maritime unions and U.S. shipping companies to discuss and resolve labor issues.

Curran was also vice chairman of the Seafarer's Section of the International Transportworkers Federation, an international confederation of maritime unions.

Curran was also vice president of the United Seamen's Service.

== Retirement and death ==
Curran suffered a heart attack in 1953 which left him somewhat less physically able than before. Over the next few years, he gradually cut back his workload, and stopped visiting local unions and attending most union meetings. In the mid-1960s, he turned over most of the union's daily business to secretary-treasurer Shannon J. Wall.

By the mid-1960s, Curran was being criticized for ignoring his members' needs and concerns. His $85,000-a-year salary was one of the highest in the American labor movement even though his union was small and shedding members. He enjoyed an unlimited expense account, and traveled by chartered jet and private limousine. He cajoled the union's executive board into building a massive, Art Deco headquarters in Manhattan, and had the edifice named after himself.

In 1966, with the surreptitious help of NMU staffers, union member James B. Morrissey challenged the results of Curran's 1966 re-election as fraudulent. The Department of Labor agreed, but a re-run election did not change the outcome.

In 1973, shortly after Curran won re-election for a thirteenth term as union president, Morrissey sued Curran and charged him with misappropriating union funds. In a precedent-setting ruling in Morrissey and Ibrahim v. Curran, 650 F.2d 1267 (1981), the U.S. Court of Appeals for the Second Circuit established a broad right for union members to sue union officers for improper financial practices.

Morrissey's barrage of lawsuits against Curran led him to retire suddenly on March 5, 1973. Long-time secretary-treasurer Shannon J. Wall succeeded him as president.

Curran retired to Boca Raton, Florida. He died there of cancer on August 14, 1981.

== Family ==
Curran married Retta Toble, a former cruise ship waitress, in 1939. The couple had a son, Joseph Paul Curran, Jr. Retta Curran died in 1963. In 1965, Curran married Florence Stetler.

== Notes ==
Trade union offices
Preceded by none	President of the National Maritime Union; 1937-1973	Succeeded by Shannon J. Wall
