= Ted Hinton =

American peace officer (1904–1977)

Deputy Sheriff Ted Hinton
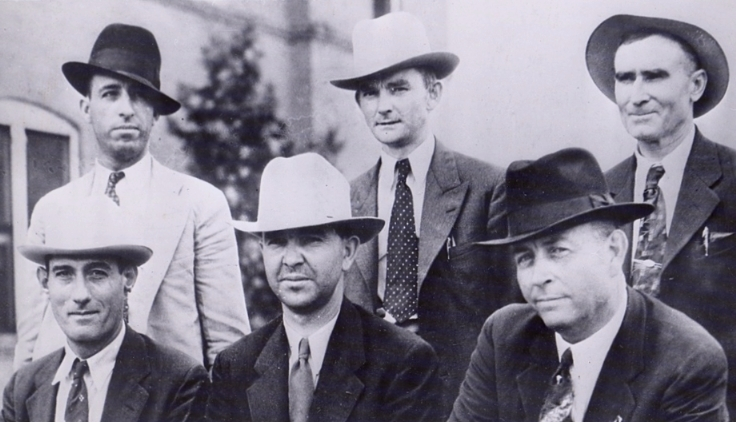
- The Gibsland posse (Hinton back row, far left)
- Born: October 5, 1904; Tulsa, Oklahoma, U.S.
- Died: October 27, 1977 (aged 73); Dallas, Texas, U.S.
- Resting place: Sparkman-Hillcrest Memorial Park Cemetery in Dallas
- Children: Including: Linton Jay "Boots" Hinton (born January 1, 1934 in Dallas, TX; died December 5, 2016 in Arcadia, LA)

Ted Cass Hinton (October 5, 1904 – October 27, 1977) was a Dallas County, Texas, deputy sheriff, the youngest of the posse that ambushed and killed Bonnie and Clyde near Gibsland, Louisiana, on May 23, 1934.

== History ==
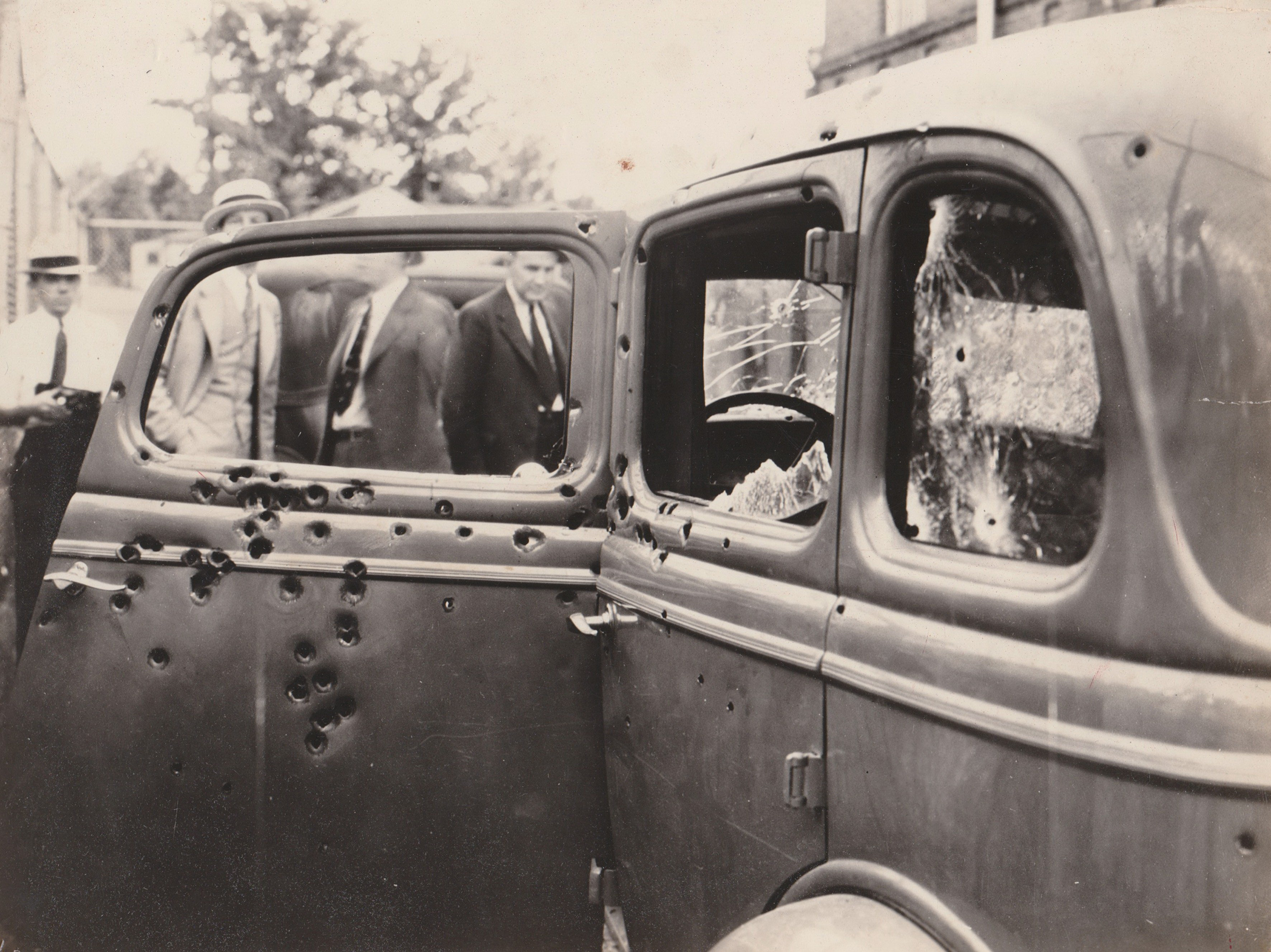
The vehicle of Bonnie and Clyde is shown riddled with bullet holes after the ambush. The picture was taken by FBI investigators on May 23, 1934

Hinton, then aged 29, was assigned to accompany Deputy Sheriff Bob Alcorn on the premise that Hinton knew Clyde Barrow and could identify him. Hinton and Alcorn were assigned by Dallas County Sheriff Richard A. "Smoot" Schmid to assist Frank Hamer and his assistant Maney Gault in a shoot-to-kill order against Bonnie and Clyde that originated with the Texas prison system chief Lee Simmons.

Hinton became a Sheriff's Deputy in 1932 following the election of Schmid. An avid baseball player, Hinton passed up a chance to join the Cleveland Indians because he did not want to spend time away from his wife and young son. Born in Tulsa, Oklahoma, and reared in Dallas, he knew the Barrow family in his youth.

Ted Hinton was also once acquainted with young Bonnie Parker while she was working in Marco's Cafe in Dallas. Because of her good looks, many of the male customers would flirt with her. Hinton was always gentlemanly and treated Bonnie with respect. Hinton admitted in a later biography that he had a crush on Bonnie, which made it difficult for him as one of the men on the team sent to kill her and her lover, Clyde.

== Controversy ==
Hinton wrote a book called Ambush in 1977, which was published in 1979, two years after his death, in which he maintained that Ivy T. Methvin was forced to lure Bonnie and Clyde into the ambush site by Frank Hamer. The original story was that Methvin had agreed to plot the ambush if his son Henry Methvin received a pardon. Hinton claimed that a deal was reached by the members of the posse whereby the last surviving member would tell this version of events after all others had died. This member happened to be Hinton. His version of events is disputed.

== Aftermath ==
Hinton remained a deputy sheriff until 1941. An accomplished pilot, he gave flying instructions to new recruits in the Army Air Corps just prior to World War II. Hinton subsequently owned a motel, trucking company and restaurant. He died in 1977 and is interred with his wife at Sparkman-Hillcrest Memorial Park Cemetery in Dallas. The couple had at least one child, former Dallas County Deputy Linton Jay "Boots" Hinton (January 1, 1934 – December 5, 2016), who had since 2004 operated the Bonnie and Clyde Ambush Museum in Gibsland, Louisiana, and also served as a Specialist 3 for the United States Army during the Korean War.

== Books by Ted Hinton ==
- Hinton, T. with Grove, L., Ambush (The Real Story of Bonnie and Clyde), Shoal Creek Publishers, 1979. ISBN 0-88319-041-9
