= United Seamen's Service =

American maritime nonprofit organization

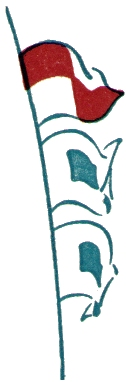
United Seamen's Service Logo

The United Seamen's Service, sometimes abbreviated as the USS, is a non-profit, federally chartered organization founded in 1942 to promote the welfare of American seafarers and their dependents, seafarers of all nations, US government military and civilian personnel, and other persons engaged in the maritime industry.

Since its inception, the USS has provided services overseas for American and international seafarers. USS's network of worldwide port centers offers seafarers two types of services:

1. Building-centered services which provide recreation, communications, counseling, food, beverages and gift shop and health articles; and outreach programs which bring USS services to seafarers on shipboard, in hospital or detention. Services include repatriation, hospital visits, detention services helping seafarers in prison, legal assistance and communications services, with overseas phone, fax and mail facilities at the USS centers.
2. Ship-visiting and library services include staff visits to ships in port with information on local attractions, customs and culture and other required assistance. Fresh reading material, supplied by the USS affiliated American Merchant Marine Library Association, are brought to restock the ship's library.

There are currently 7 port centers open: Bremerhaven, Germany; Casablanca, Morocco; Diego Garcia, B.I.O.T.; Guam, M.I.; Naha, Okinawa, Japan; Busan, Korea; and Yokohama, Japan. Many other centers existed during the years of World War II and thereafter, including centers in Naples and Genoa, Italy; Bandar Mahshahr, Iran; Cam Ranh Bay, Vietnam; Alexandria, Egypt and Manila, Philippines.

While the main charter of the USS is to serve merchant marine personnel, a large part of their clientele over the years has come from United States Navy and other international military personnel. As the constitution of merchant marine fleets changed over time, with many computerized supertankers requiring only a handful of crewmen to operate, and with military deployment adjustments, many centers were forced to close due to reduced patronage. As an example the center in Naples, Italy was heavily dependent on personnel from the United States Sixth Fleet; during the 1970s, aircraft carriers (such as the USS John F. Kennedy (CV-67), destroyer tenders (such as the USS Grand Canyon (AD-28) and USS Cascade (AD-16), as well as myriad destroyers and patrol gunboats made Naples their home, and sailors found the USS facilities another home away from home.

The U.S. Military has long cooperated with the United Seamen's Service in a number of ways. DoD Directive 1330.16, issued July 10, 1971 (now cancelled) provided for policies, procedures, and responsibilities governing DoD cooperation with and assistance to the United Seamen's Service (USS) under Title 10, United States Code, Section 2604.

Each year the USS confers its AOTOS (Admiral of the Ocean Sea) award upon individuals who have made significant contributions to maritime commerce. In 1983, the USS conferred the award on US Congressman Mario Biaggi. During his tenure in office Biaggi was Chairman of the United States House Committee on Merchant Marine and Fisheries Subcommittee on Coast Guard and Navigation.

The USS is a part of the Global Impact Coalition, which contains 55 of the most respected charities in the world.
