= 1935 Gulf Coast longshoremen's strike =

The 1935 Gulf Coast longshoremen's strike was a labor action of the International Longshoremen's Association. Lasting for about ten weeks from October 1, 1935 to mid-December on the Gulf Coast of the United States, the strike was marked by significant violence.

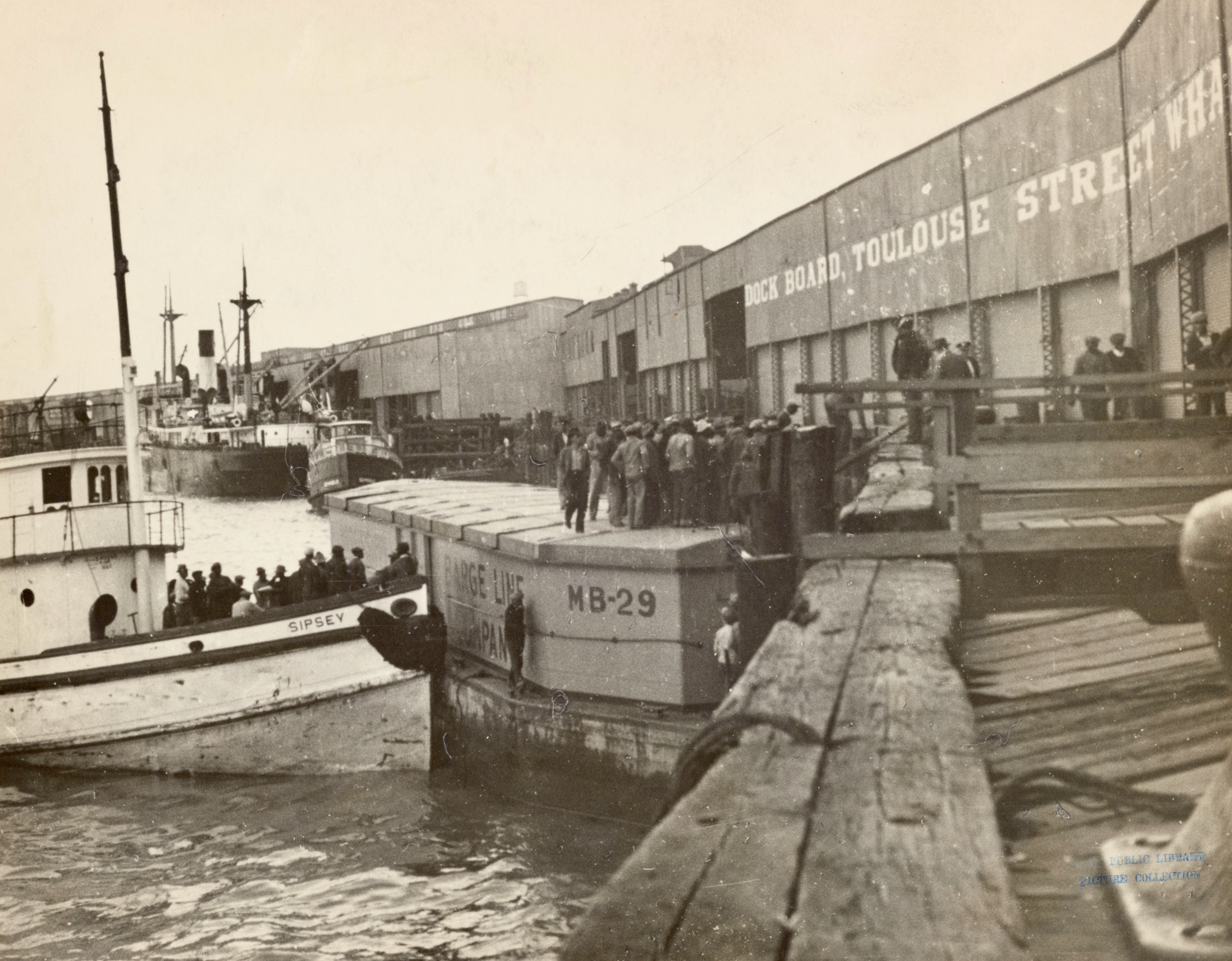
"Bringing in the Scabs" - Toulouse Street Wharf, New Orleans 1935

== Motivations ==
In Houston, New Orleans, and other major docks along the Gulf Coast, strikes and other labor conflict had been a regular annual occurrence through the 1930s. The 1934 West Coast waterfront strike of the previous summer, involving workers from both the ILA and the International Seamen's Union, had developed into a general strike in San Francisco, with encouraging results for dock workers. Moreover Texan union longshoremen tended to look to the West Coast for inspiration, rather than President Joe Ryan and his "dictatorial rule" as president of the national ILA.

Locals of the ILA struck 23 major shipping companies of the Gulf Coast, beginning on October 1. The ports involved included Corpus Christi, Galveston, Houston, Port Arthur, Beaumont, Lake Charles, New Orleans, Mobile, and Pensacola. The overall goal of the strike was ILA control of dock operations in New Orleans.

The strike failed although many locals struck without the support of the corresponding Seamen's Union locals and against the active resistance of Ryan.

The NAACP's publication The Crisis pointed out that New Orleans already had two strong unaffiliated longshore unions (one white, one black), which kept working all through the strike; that the ILA's forced closure of other Gulf ports had only driven ship traffic towards New Orleans; and that the change might be permanent.

== Aftermath ==
The ten weeks of the strike were marked with significant violence. Police in Houston, for instance, deputized 56 strikebreakers into the force temporarily, several being former officers allowed to wear their old uniforms, and dock officials imported their own recruits by the busload and hired Frank Hamer to head "a special force of twenty ex-Texas Rangers and sheriffs to prevent sabotage and looting." That became a full-time position for Hamer for years, and he earned more than he had ever made. "Special officers" loyal to industrial interests remained attached to the Houston Police for another year until they were dismissed as part of the resolution of the 1936 Gulf Coast maritime workers' strike in January 1937, engineered by incoming Mayor Richard Fonville.

Associated Press reports counted 11 killings related to the strike on November 9, then a total of 14 on November 27. Known casualties include a black strikebreaker named Henry Jones, said to be the first fatality, on October 5; a striking ILA member named Etienne Christ shot to death in Port Arthur, Texas, on 10/21; three strikebreakers killed at the Port of Lake Charles, Louisiana, on 10/22; independent black longshoreman Will Ballinger drowned while trying to escape from an attacking mob; and striker Samuel L. Brandt shot to death in Houston on 11/25.

The conflict, particularly in Houston and Galveston, would continue through the 1936 Gulf Coast maritime workers' strike into early 1937.
